= 2019 Yorkshire Dales floods =

July 2019 floods in northern England

2019 Yorkshire Dales Floods
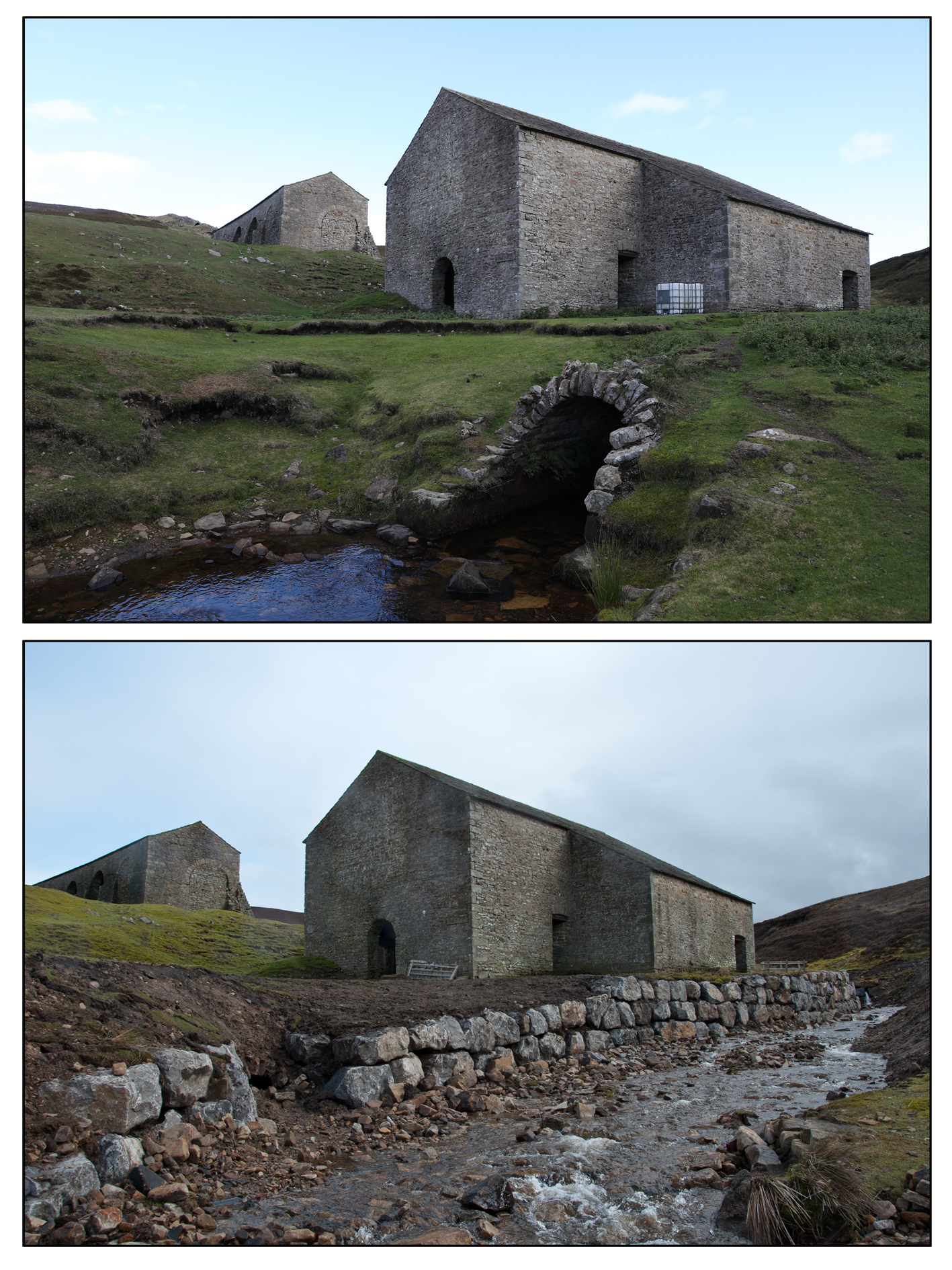
- Grinton Smelt Mill post June 2019 floods. The image at the top shows the Mill and Barrel-Arched Watercourse in September 2018. The lower image is post-flooding, taken in March 2020.
- Date: 30 July 2019
- Location: Arkengarthdale, Swaledale, Wensleydale
- Deaths: 0
- Property damage: Extensive

In July 2019, parts of the Yorkshire Dales, in North Yorkshire, England, were subjected to above average rainfall for the time of year. The flash-flooding that followed affected many communities destroying bridges, sweeping roads away, causing landslips on railway lines and resulting in at least one public event being cancelled. The flooding even inundated the fire station in the town of Leyburn, in Wensleydale, whilst the crew were out helping those in need. The recovery took many weeks and months, with immediate help by the rescue services being bolstered by British Army personnel who assisted with the clean up.

The flood was described as being a 1-in-100 year event with one newspaper report later describing the conditions as being "monsoon-like weather".

== Background ==
=== Meteorological history ===
Average annual rainfall in the Pennines is 59 inches (1,500 mm) which drops away at the east coast where the average is 24 inches (600 mm). The Pennines are known to be part of the rain shadow in the United Kingdom; this is due to the prevailing westerly winds dropping precipitation on the western side of the country and leaving the eastern side drier. Comparisons can be made between Manchester, on the western side of the Pennines, and Sheffield on the eastern side. These two cities are 35 miles (56 km) apart, and 128 feet (39 m) and 433 feet (132 m) above sea level respectively. Manchester's average rainfall is 33.8 inches (858 mm) and Sheffield's is 31.6 inches (802 mm). Between the two cities is the Peak District, which has the same effect as the Pennines, dropping more rain on the west than on the east. Of the top ten rainiest cities or towns in England, only Huddersfield, in Yorkshire, is on the eastern side of mainland Britain; the rest are on the west side of the rain shadow. (Note: The full list is Cardiff, Glasgow, Preston, Huddersfield, Blackpool, Carlisle, Plymouth, Manchester, Gloucester, Liverpool.)

The wettest location in the Yorkshire Dales is Snaizeholme (near to Widdale) 1,900 feet (579 m) above sea level, and where the average annual rainfall is 77 inches (1,957 mm). The Yorkshire Dales (and the Howgill Fells) have suffered historical flooding in 1870,1890, 1899 and 1986 (Hurricane Charley). The floods of January 1890 swept away the bridge over the Swale at Gunnerside.

Peak flooding has also been recorded in the 1940s, the 1960s and the 1980s. Flash floods have affected the area throughout the 21st century, with events occurring in 2009, in June 2012, and September 2012 which closed the A1 road. In 2016, a flash flood inundated the White Scar Caves visitor centre.

Most of these flood events have been described as "intense, highly localized convectional summer storms, under anticyclonic conditions, or by slow moving or near-stationary fronts." This can be seen in the fact that the area where the water fell, was concentrated in a 4-mile (6.4 km) radius around the town of Reeth; places like Bellerby and Leyburn suffered as a result of rainfall elsewhere, whereas Richmond, 10 miles (16 km) to the east, was described as having no rain at all on the day of the floods.

Most flooding events in Britain have been the result of a climatic condition known as the North Atlantic Oscillation (NAO-) when it has been in a negative phase, which can lead to wetter seasons. Records indicate that the River Swale has had 145 flash flood events between 1700 and 2013. Flooding in Swaledale, Wensleydale and Nidderdale, usually results in flooding on the River Ouse in York.

=== Physical causes ===
On the 30 July 2019, the Yorkshire Dales and east Cumbria regions experienced extreme above average rainfall from what is typically expected in the summertime. Malham Tarn in the Craven District of Yorkshire, typically receives 3.5 inches (89 mm) of rain as a monthly average; on the 30 July 2019, 3.2 inches (81 mm) fell in a 24-hour period, with most of that actually falling within four hours. Langthwaite in Arkengarthdale, was stated to have received 5.2 inches (132 mm) in two hours, and Arkle Town received 4 inches (102 mm), with 3.2 inches (82 mm) of that falling in 90 minutes.

Over 7.7 square miles (20 km^{2}) of land around the village of Reeth, was listed as having been inundated with over 2,100,000 litres (460,000 imp gal; 550,000 US gal) in just under five hours. A report later stated that this was enough water to fill over 800 Olympic-sized swimming pools.

The same weather front caused flooding in South Manchester, East Cheshire and Whaley Bridge in Derbyshire which lead to the town being partly evacuated in case the damaged reservoir failed and caused an extreme flood event.

== Effects and responses ==
The valleys of Arkengarthdale, Swaledale and Wensleydale were badly hit with flooding, though most of the damage caused by the flooding was in Swaledale and Arkengarthdale. At least 13 footbridges were swept away and 2.2 miles (3.5 km) of footpaths were damaged, eroded completely or covered in debris. More than a dozen rights of way were still closed by the end of December 2019. Park Rangers from the Yorkshire Dales National Park expressed their dismay at the event, stating that Storm Desmond wreaked such devastation that they thought they wouldn't see the likes of it again. The Settle and Carlisle railway line was subjected to a landslip between Ribblehead and Dent railway stations. Whilst this was rectified relatively quickly, buses replaced trains for two days whilst the landslip was dealt with.

The bridge over Cogden Gill on the Grinton Moor road between Grinton and Leyburn was destroyed by the flash floods. Further upstream, part of the grade II* listed Grinton Smelt Mill (the barrel-arched watercourse) was destroyed by the floodwater, and leaving the main building in danger of becoming unstable due to erosion by floodwater. The bridge on Grinton Moor had been made famous by featuring in the 2014 Grand Depart of the Tour de France. A bridge that spanned the same stream on the B6270 between Downholme and Grinton, was weakened and became unsafe to drive over and additionally, part of that road was washed away. Extreme flash flooding affected properties in Reeth, Leyburn, Fremington, Grinton, Bellerby, Middleham and Langthwaite.

One farmer in Reeth had to rescue his sheep from a tree which had been carried there by floodwater "12-foot (3.7 m) deeper than normal." One woman who was watching the water from her cottage in Arkengarthdale, stated how she saw the water approaching Langthwaite. A huge surge of water was observed "..taking the [drystone] walls down, one by one, in the valley. It was unbelievable - they were like dominoes. Then it hit Grinton and Reeth."

Whilst no deaths were reported, there were some injuries and close-calls; the landlady of the Red Lion Inn in Langthwaite was in her pub when water came in with such force that it was 5 feet (1.5 m) deep and leaving her submerged up to her chin. A postal worker on his rounds and another man rescued a 92-year old woman who had fallen into a "waist-high stream of water" in her back garden. Pets and livestock were killed and crops ruined. Many houses and other buildings were completely ruined by floodwater ingress. North Yorkshire Fire and Rescue Service stated that they had received 115 calls to reports of flooding in Leyburn and Reeth and that over 100 homes were flooded out with sheds and oil tanks floating down roads in between houses. The fire station in Leyburn suffered from extreme flooding whilst its crew were out helping those who were affected by the water. The building was renovated and repaired, and was able to be re-occupied by December 2019.

The Swaledale Mountain Rescue Team (SMRT) went to help people caught in the flooding, including one family who were trapped upstairs in their house. When the team entered the property, the fridge was floating on the water and touching the ceiling of a downstairs room. By the end of the day, the SMRT had effected the rescue of ten people.

The Ard Rock off-road cycling event, that is held annually in Grinton over the first weekend in August, had to be called-off as the campsite, and main showground, were submerged underwater. The organiser's later awarded the charity clean-up fund almost £50,000. The flooding of the River Swale on the other side of Grinton, inundated the Dales Bike Centre at Fremington, with water pouring off the moor through Grinton Beck flooding properties there, including the Bridge Inn, which had its access footbridge swept away by flood water.

== Aftermath ==
When the clean up started on 31 July, personnel from the British Army were drafted in to help. The troops from the 2nd Battalion of the Yorkshire Regiment were understood to have been asked by their commanding officer to assist in the clean-up operation rather than being called in by the authorities. More than 300 homes, 30 businesses and 50 farms were flooded out, many of whom were assessed as being "..low wages, low fixed-pension incomes, tenant hill farmers or small businesses" and so were deemed as having little, or no, "financial resistance".

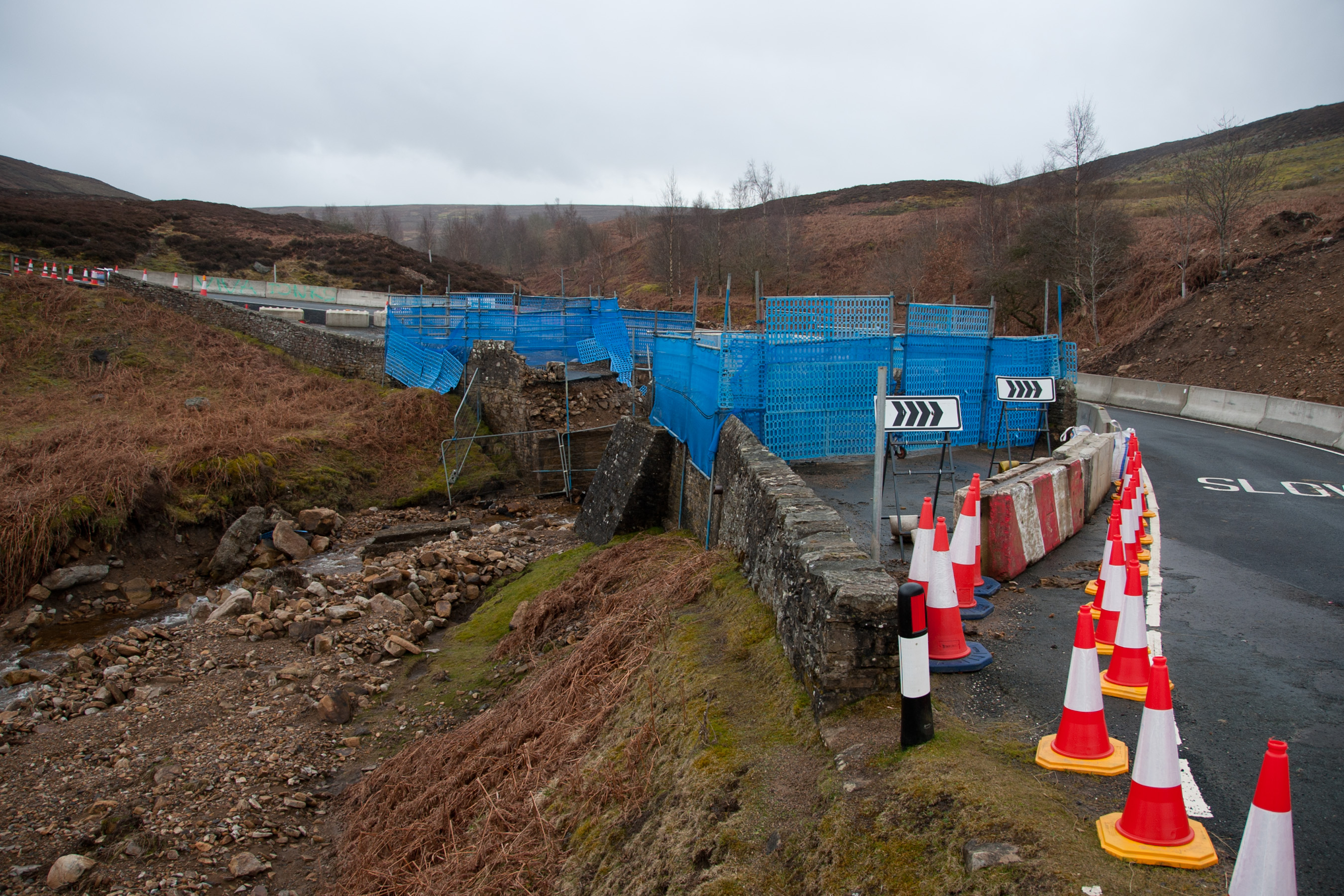
Cogden Gill temporary bridge looking south

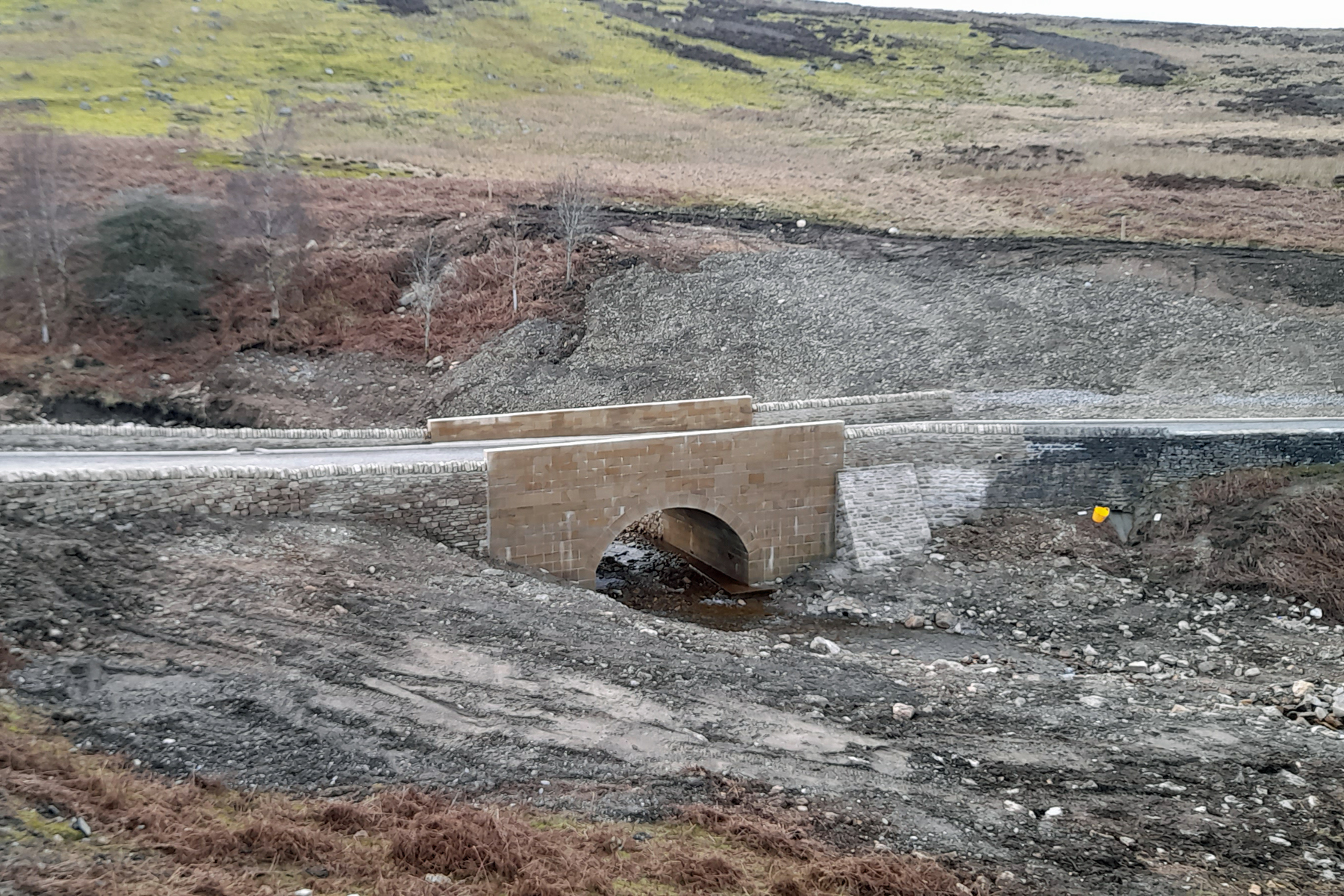
The repaired 2021 Bridge at Cogden Gill on the C106

A week after the event, the local MP announced that the bill to repair roads, bridges, footpaths and buildings could be as high as £3 million, for what was described as a 1-in-100 year event. A temporary bridge spanning Cogden Gill on the B6270 was in place and ready for traffic by 14 August 2019; similarly, the bridge on the C106 on Grinton Moor was given a temporary replacement with an effort starting in repairing the old bridge structure and location. However, further torrential rain in September 2019 prevented the location being used by the 2019 UCI Road World Championships. A treasure chest of £3 million was released to North Yorkshire County Council under the Bellwin scheme for the repair of the two ruined bridges.

Also in September 2019, DEFRA revealed a £2 million fund for farmers who had been affected by the flooding in the Yorkshire Dales and Lincolnshire. At the end of September 2019, residents in Grinton were still waiting for remediation to be carried out on the beck that drops down the southern edge of the dale, and into the River Swale. A house at the bottom of the beck was in danger of collapsing into the water, and a "wait and see" scenario was being undertaken. In October 2019, the Dry Stone Walling Association (DSWA) held a Reeth Wallathon to help repair many broken boundaries in the fields; they managed to rebuild over 720 feet (220 m).

Businesses in Leyburn were still just re-opening some six months after the flooding. The local newspaper, the Darlington and Stockton Times, said the effects of the flash-flooding were long-lasting and described the event as "monsoon-like weather".

In February 2020, the local authority's application for extra funding was refused by the government as the flash-flooding was not deemed severe enough in terms of damage to properties and livelihoods. The response stated that "we normally expect that the local authorities have well established contingency arrangements in place such as funding from existing budgets and the resources to respond and support local communities. We appreciate that this would come as disappointing news, but we would not be able to extend this funding to flooding outside of this."

Also in February 2020, many of the communities and valleys listed above, suffered further flooding in Storm Dennis and Storm Ciara.

The new bridge over Cogden Gill carrying the B6270 Richmond to Grinton road, was opened to traffic in November 2020. Both it, and the bridge over Cogden Gill on the Grinton to Leyburn road, had temporary bridges installed by the council. The second bridge (on the road to Leyburn), was expected to open soon after, and was unveiled in March 2021.

== See also ==
- 2019 Toddbrook Reservoir incident, damage to a dam and reservoir caused by the same weather event.
- 2019–20 United Kingdom floods, flooding across England that occurred in November 2019 and February 2020.
