= Bellwin scheme =

The Bellwin scheme is a United Kingdom government emergency financial assistance which "reimburses local authorities for costs incurred on, or in connection with, their immediate actions to safeguard life and property or to prevent suffering or severe inconvenience as a result of a disaster or emergency in their area".

== Framework ==
The scheme is usually set up in response to weather events, but can also be used to cover other circumstances. It is a discretionary scheme which exists to give special financial assistance to local authorities which would otherwise be faced with an undue financial burden as a result of providing relief and carrying out immediate work due to large-scale emergencies. Where the criteria of the scheme are met, the grant is normally payable to authorities at 85% of the eligible costs incurred above a threshold set for each authority, although occasionally the grant rate is increased to 100%.

The scheme is named after a 1980s environment minister, Lord Bellwin, who, as Irwin Bellow had been leader of Leeds City Council from 1975 to 1979. In 1983, Bellwin introduced the compensation scheme, which was incorporated in the Local Government and Housing Act 1989 and revised in 2014.

A Bellwin scheme may be activated, at the discretion of the environment secretary,

- when an emergency or disaster involving destruction of, or danger to, life or property occurs;
- and, as a result, one or more local authorities incur expenditure on, or in connection with the taking of immediate action;
- or to safeguard life or property or to prevent suffering or severe inconvenience in a local authority's area or among its inhabitants.

Councils, police, fire and national park authorities are eligible for Bellwin reimbursement when they have spent more than the usual threshold 0.2% of their calculated annual revenue budget on works which meet the above criteria that have been reported to the Department as eligible for an announced grant scheme.

== Bellwin-like schemes under the devolved administrations of the United Kingdom ==
Bellwin support or schemes are the responsibility of the devolved administrations outside England. The scheme's operation in Scotland is under the control of the Scottish Government, but is broadly the same the English scheme. The Welsh Government operates an equivalent scheme called the Emergency Financial Assistance Scheme (EFAS).

The Northern Ireland Executive has established specific, time-limited schemes rather than a single equivalent to the Bellwin scheme. The most recent scheme runs from July to August 2019.

== Events for which the Bellwin scheme has been enacted ==
=== England ===
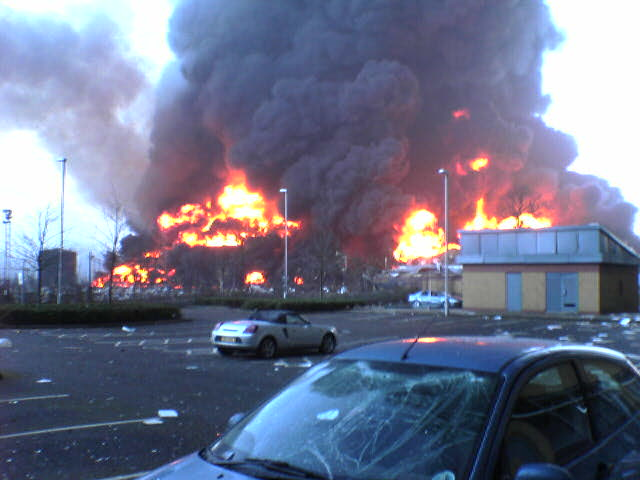
2005 Buncefield oil depot fire

- 2020 Storm Ciara and Storm Dennis.
- 2019 Whaley Bridge dam damage and summer flooding in North Yorkshire and Lincolnshire. Also flooding in November in Yorkshire.
- 2018 United Kingdom wildfires
- 2017 Grenfell Tower Fire
- 2015–16 Great Britain and Ireland floods inclusive of Storm Desmond, Flooding in Cumbria, Lancashire and Yorkshire.
- 2013–14 Southern England flooding (inclusive of storm events from 5 December onwards including the North Sea surge, Christmas storms and the New Year storms)
- 2012 Summer flooding
- 2011 England riots
- 2011 Swinley Forest fire
- 2008 Morpeth floods
- 2007 United Kingdom floods
- 2005 Buncefield oil depot fire
- 2001 United Kingdom foot-and-mouth outbreak
- 2000 Autumn floods
- 1999 Korean Air Cargo Flight 8509 crash near Stansted Airport
- 1998 Easter floods
- 1996 Docklands bombing
- 1996 Manchester bombing
- 1995 Unexploded World War II bomb Isle of Portland
- 1995 Fire on Thorne Moor, near Doncaster
- 1994 January West Sussex and Isle of Wight
- 1993 20/21 February storm North Norfolk
- 1993 9 and 12 June heavy rainfall and flooding in Cornwall.
- 1989/1990 inclusive of Storm 16/17 December 1989 and Burns' Day storm Jan 25 1990.
- 1987 Great storm
- 1987 Severe snowfall in Kent and Norfolk

=== Scotland ===
- 2018 Great Britain and Ireland cold wave
- 2015 Storm Desmond flooding in particular Scottish Borders, Dumfries and Galloway, Tayside, Speyside and Moray.
- 2014 Flooding from the extratropical remains of Hurricane Bertha.
- 2012 Flooding in Comrie, Perth and Kinross.
- 2005 Gudrun storm
- 2004 Perth and Kinross flooding
- 2003 Shetland landslides
- 2002 Moray flooding
- 2001 Scottish Borders and South Lanarkshire snowfall
- 2000 Subsidence at Ferniehill (Edinburgh)
- 2000 Edinburgh and Midlothian flooding
- 1998 Boxing Day Storm
- 1997 Moray flooding
- 1996 Dumfries and Galloway heavy snow
- 1995/1996 Severe weather December and January
- 1995 Grampian flooding
- 1994 Strathclyde flooding
- 1993 Tayside flooding

== Reform ==
In January 2014 Eric Pickles, the Secretary of State for Communities and Local Government announced that during the 2013–2014 floods the Bellwin scheme would refund 100% of local spending, with the threshold of 0.02% of annual council revenue also reduced. He also announced that a full review of the Bellwin scheme was also to be undertaken, with a view to future reform.

== See also ==
- European Union Solidarity Fund, a disaster relief fund operated by the European Union for member states, which has a much higher threshold of loss requirement (€3 billion at 2002 prices, or more than 0.6% gross national income).
- List of natural disasters in the United Kingdom
