= Low Whita Farm =

Farm in Grinton, North Yorkshire, England

Coordinates: 54.3788°N 1.9993°W

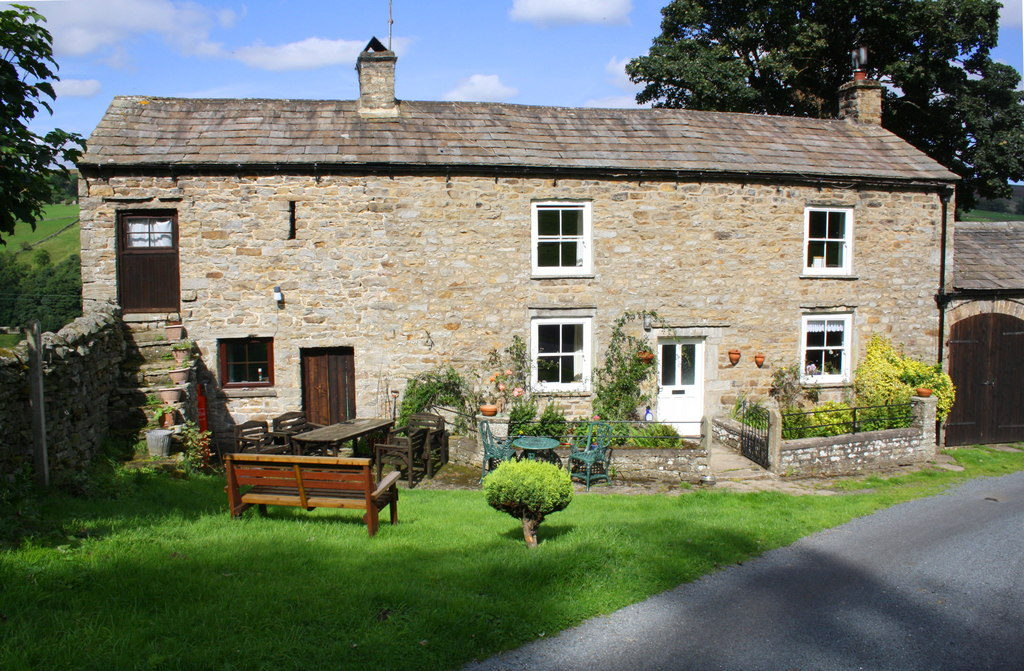
The farmhouse, in 2016

Low Whita Farm is a farm in Grinton, a village in North Yorkshire, in England.

== History ==
The farm probably existed during the mediaeval period, and towards the end of the era its land was owned by Bridlington Priory. The western range probably originated in about 1600 as a cruck framed house, and then perhaps in the mid 17th century, it was rebuilt in stone. In about 1680, it was divided into two smaller houses, and in the 18th century, the walls were heightened and the roof rebuilt. In the mid-19th century, one of the houses was again divided in two, and all the properties were occupied by lead miners, later becoming agricultural. The barn to the south of the range may originally have been another 17th century house, originally single-storey, but heightened to two storeys in about 1800. At that time, it was part of an extensive range of outbuildings, but the rest of the range was demolished during the 19th century. It is now attached to the houses by an extension to the cow house at their western end.

The eastern range of the farm is also 17th century, and it was extended to the west probably before 1700. Early in the following century, the extension was divided off as a separate house, and the eaves were raised, to reduce the slope of the roof. The facade was rebuilt, and an additional bay to the east incorporated, which may have been a barn. A further two-bay barn was added to the east in the mid-18th century. In the early 19th century, the eastern bay was raised to two storeys and converted into another house, and the windows were replaced, and yet another barn was added at the east of the range. At this time, the oldest section of the range was used as a butter factory.

During the late 20th century, the buildings were gradually abandoned, the last tenant being a farmer. In 2019, both ranges were separately grade II* listed. In 2021, it was added to the Heritage at Risk Register.

== Architecture ==
The farmhouse and farm buildings are built of gritstone, the east range with quoins, and all have roofs of sandstone slate roof with stone ridges. In the east range, the farmhouse and attached cottage to the west have two storeys and four bays. On the front are two doorways, one blocked, and sash windows. Attached to the east is a two-bay barn or byre, and further to the east is another, later, barn with two bays. To the south is a gig house with two bays and two storeys, and attached to the cottage is a lean-to. On the south is a garden enclosed by a coped wall, and a smaller garden with railings. The west range included a pair of farmhouses to the north with two storeys and a total of six bays, each with a stair turret. Both western houses have a doorway with a quoined surround, the right doorway also with a decorative lintel with a date and initials, and there are also later inserted doorways. The windows vary, and include a chamfered mullioned window, fire windows, a slit window, and others that have been altered. The barn to the south has two storeys and two bays, and contains doorways, a taking-in door and slit vents.

== See also ==
- Grade II* listed buildings in North Yorkshire (district)
- Listed buildings in Grinton
