= Blackburn Hall =

House in Grinton, North Yorkshire, England

Coordinates: 54.3815°N 1.9303°W

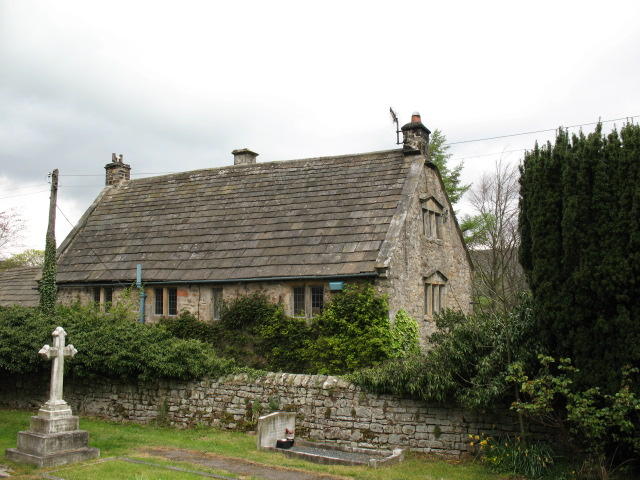
The building, in 2007

Blackburn Hall is a historic building in Grinton, a village in North Yorkshire, in England.

The building lies on the north side of the churchyard of St Andrew's Church, Grinton. It originated in the Mediaeval period as "Nether Hall", probably lodgings for canons from Bridlington Priory, and the cross-wing survives from this period. After the Dissolution of the Monasteries, it succeeded Swale Hall as home of the local manor house. In 1635, what is now the main body of the house was added. In the mid-18th century, the Blackburne family acquired the manor, and the house thereafter took their name. The house was grade II* listed in 1952.

The house is built of stone, with quoins, and a stone slate roof with stone copings and kneelers. There are three storeys, the older part forming a cross-wing to the main range of 1635, and an outshut in the angle. The main range contains a doorway with chamfered stone jambs and a four-centred arched head. Throughout there are chamfered mullioned windows and hood moulds in the form of a pediment. Inside, the main range has a stone staircase and a fireplace with an inscription "EH B 1635".

== See also ==
- Grade II* listed buildings in North Yorkshire (district)
- Listed buildings in Grinton
