= Grinton Lodge =

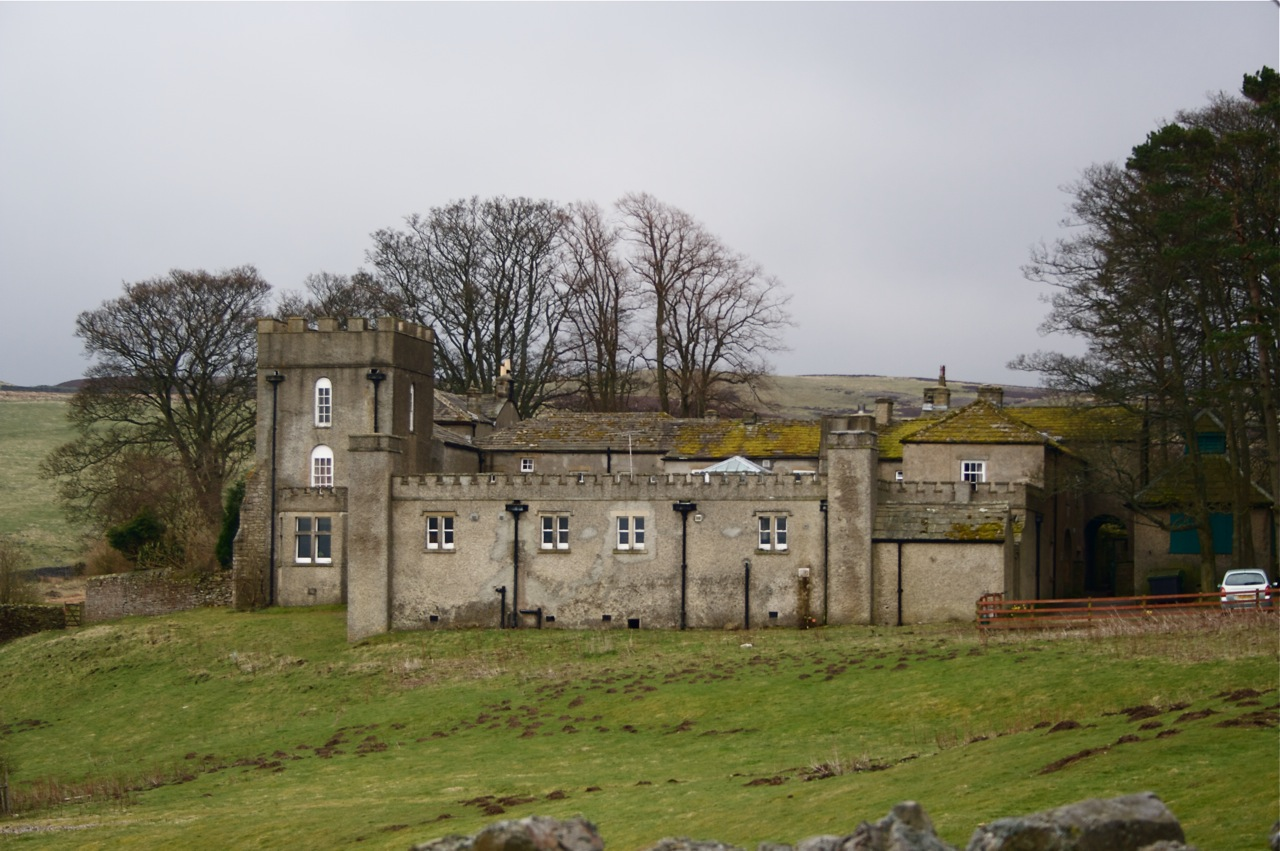
- Grinton Lodge viewed from the north

- Location within North Yorkshire
- 54°22′26″N 1°55′39″W
- Location: Grinton
- OS grid reference: SE048975

History
- Built: 1817
- Built for: James Fenton

Site notes
- Area: North Yorkshire, England

Listed Building – Grade II
- Designated: 21 April 1986
- Reference no.: 1179379

Grinton Lodge is a 19th-century former shooting lodge that has been a youth hostel since 1948. A Grade II listed building, it is situated above the village of Grinton, in Swaledale, North Yorkshire, England.

== History ==
The lodge was built in 1817 for James Fenton of Doncaster, but by the middle of the century it had been sold first to the Wentworth family of Wakefield and then to John Charlesworth Dodgson-Charlesworth, also of Wakefield. The property remained with the Charlesworth family until after the Second World War, when following the death of the owner, Barney Charlesworth, his widow sold the property to the Youth Hostels Association. During the stewardship of the Charlesworth's the property was extensively modified to allow use by Albany Charlesworth, who used a wheelchair following a hunting accident. Since 1948 it has been used continuously as a youth hostel.

== Construction ==
The Lodge is built around a courtyard; the main ranges are the north and east each of which have two storeys with a third storey tower on the southern end of the east range. Nowadays these two ranges and the west range form the youth hostel accommodation. The south range originally the stable block now forms classrooms for educational use. Throughout the buildings are of rubble build covered with pebble dash. Door and window surrounds are ashlar sandstone with a mixture of classical and gothic styles used.

== See also ==
- Listed buildings in Grinton
