= Grinton Smelt Mill =

Lead working site in Yorkshire, England

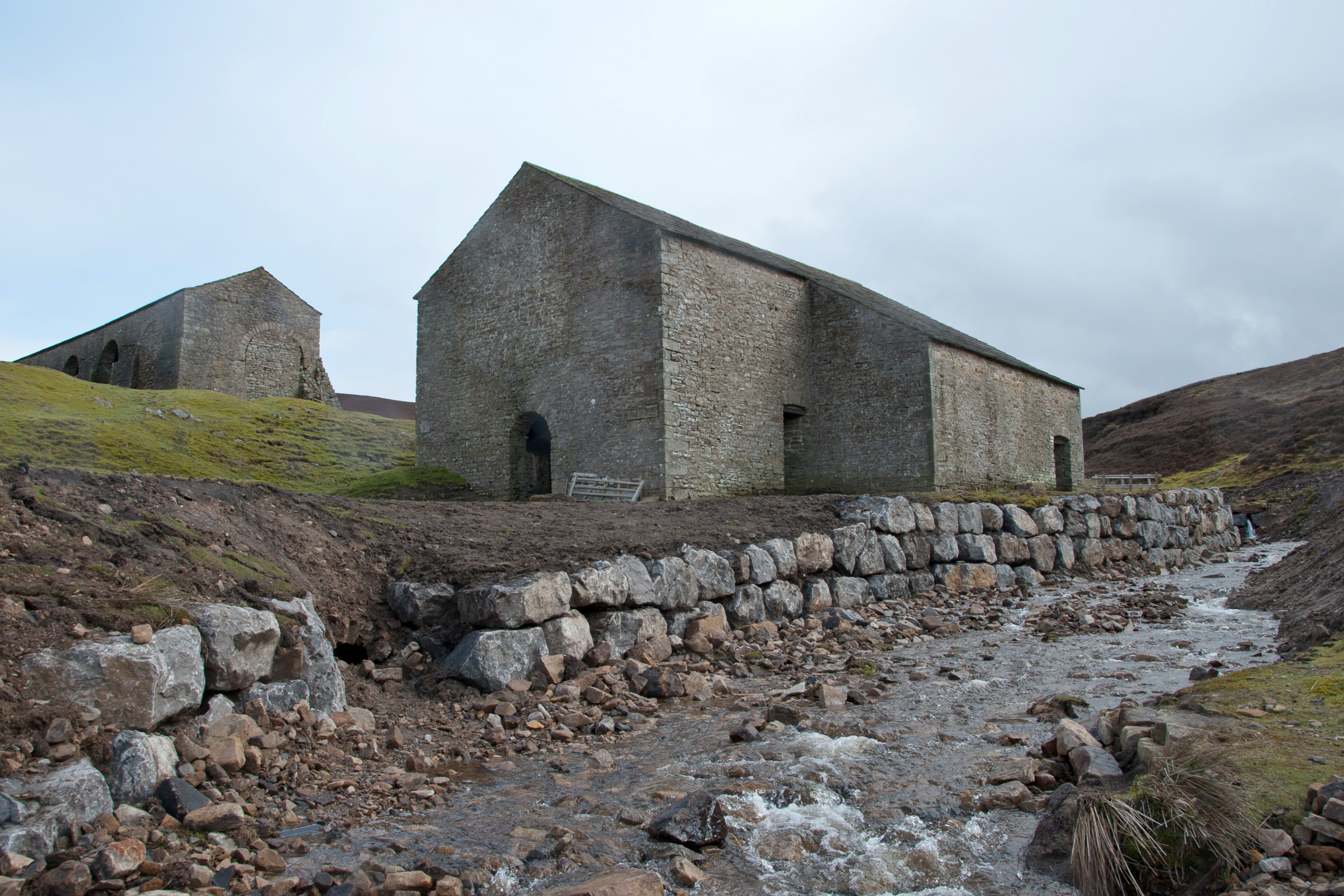
- Grinton Mill and new (2020) rock-amour watercourse

- Location in North Yorkshire
- Location: Grinton, North Yorkshire, England; 54.3633°N 1.9264°W
- Products: Lead
- Production: 100 tonnes (110 tons)
- Financial year: 1739–1740
- Opened: 1822
- Closed: 1886–1895

Grinton Smelt Mill (also known as How Mill) is a ruined lead mining and processing site on Cogden Moor, south of Grinton in Swaledale, North Yorkshire, England. The site was built in its present form c. 1820 for the specific purpose of processing lead won by hushing and hydraulic mining. The buildings and stone flue are now grade II* listed structures and all are scheduled monuments. The site is recognised as being the best preserved lead mining site in the Yorkshire Dales.

A mill had existed on the site since the early 18th century, but the later addition of a 980-foot (300 m) flue allowed workers to recover waste lead from the flue.

== History ==
Since Roman times, the Yorkshire Dales were an important source of lead. The history of lead mining in Swaledale is believed to go as far back as the 2nd century BC, however, the first written records of lead being worked in the Grinton area are in documents dated in 1219. The ownership of land in the area was split between the Manor of Healaugh and the Priory at Bridlington, but at the Dissolution, the land was sold off with the crown maintaining mineral rights over any future enterprises.

Lead worked at Grinton Smelt Mill came from the Grinton How Vein (mined at Grinton How, Whiteside and Fearnought Mines) which was just to the south of the mill site. Lead working was difficult because the ore is so heavy, therefore the smelt mills were located quite close to the occurrence of lead ore rather than a central mill fed by several mines. This led to over 30 mills in Swaledale alone. Grinton Mill was also known variously as How Mill (as it processed lead from the How Vein) and Low Mill, which is believed to stem from the fact that Grovebeck Mill some 1.2 miles (2 km) to the west, was some 330 feet (100 m) higher.

The site is 1.2 miles (2 km) south of Grinton and 5.6 miles (9 km) north west of Leyburn and situated at the confluence of Smales Gill and Cogden Gill. The first mill on the site was built c. 1727 by William Marriott, though the area was heavily mined before this time. A relative of William Marriott, Reginald Marriott, was granted a right to mine the area in 1696, something that led him into dispute with Lord Wharton. Lord Wharton, a local landowner and politician, laid claim to the land and started up his own mines less than 100 yards (91 m) from Marriott's. This led to a trial that started in 1705 and involved over 317 witnesses and was not completed until after three years of legal wrangling. The judiciary found in the favour of Marriott, and whilst Wharton threatened further legal action, the case was never heard again. It is possible that a drop in the price of lead between 1710 and 1720, meant that he had lost interest in the case. In 1720, Marriott sought an extension on the lease of the area up to 1727, but was required to pay one-eighth of his turnover to the crown. Jennings and Fieldhouse suggest that the venture must have been profitable for him to agree to this.

The London Lead Company (LLC) are believed to have purchased the site and two mines from Marriott in 1733, and installed new furnaces, though modern research has cast doubt on whether or not the LLC ever came to Swaledale and ran any operations whatsoever. During the 1730s, the production of Grinton Mill was a little over 100 tonnes (110 tons) per year, though this must be remembered as a final product out from the mill, not the tonnage that was mined.

The mill buildings that stand into the modern day, are those constructed between 1820 and 1822. Many historians believe that the long time between the old mill being decommissioned, and full production starting in the new mill, is suggestive that the entire site was completely rebuilt between 1820 and 1822. (Note: White notes that Tyson and Spensley have stated that there seems to be very little difference in external walls shown on Ordnance Survey mapping from 1774 to 1856 and 1893.) Originally the site was composed of three buildings, but only the main mill and peat store survive. The third building is annotated on mapping from the 1890s as being the Smithy. Pictures exist of the building which was demolished in the 1960s.

The main building is 53 feet (16 m) long by 36 feet (11 m) wide. Lead smelting was carried out in the main mill, with peat chutes located on the south side of the peat store to feed into the mill when necessary. The main room in the mill contained three hearths for roasting the ore, and behind this (to the north) was the bellows room (16 feet (4.9 m) x 26 feet (7.9 m). An external waterwheel was attached to the outside wall of the bellows room and this measured approximately 20 feet (6.1 m) in diameter, and 20 inches (500 mm) wide. Peat was sourced from the neighbouring moorland and brought to the site on horse and cart. The large open archways in the north wall of the peat house were to aid the drying of the peat in readiness for use in the mill next door.

The flue went eastwards up the hill over a distance of 980 feet (300 m) onto the top of the nearby Sharrow Hill at a height of 1,210 feet (370 m) above sea level. The chimney width has been estimated at 9 feet (2.7 m) on each side. Surveys indicate that the flue was 5 feet 11 inches (1.8 m) high and 5 feet 3 inches (1.6 m) wide internally. A longer flue allowed for lead to be reclaimed from waste gases expelled through it. Several access holes have been located on the flue on the south side only, where small boys were employed to scrape the toxic dust from the flue's walls.

To the immediate west of the smelt mill building was a 40-foot-long (12 m) barrel-arched watercourse which carried Cogden Beck away from the smelt mill. The watercourse was the overflow from a man-made reservoir built to the immediate south on ground higher than the mill building. The reservoir fed a "wobbly aqueduct", known as a launder, which carried water into the smelt mill at roof height, and about 10 feet (3 m) above the axle height of the wheel, which has led to a calculation of 20 feet (6.1 m) for the diameter of the waterwheel. The water then powered the waterwheel which activated the bellows and kept the furnaces supplied with air to aid the smelting of rock.

Population of Swaledale

The lead mining industry in Grinton, and Swaledale, had a profound effect on the population of the dale. The graph shows the census statistics for 120 years across the 19th and early 20th century. A depression in the lead industry between 1829 and 1833, led to fall in the number of miners, but the lead industry was dwindling by this time anyway due to cheaper imports from abroad. Thereafter, the statistics are steadily dropping.

Various closure dates have been put forward for Grinton Mill; several sources suggest 1886, but some postulate that a subsidiary company (the Grinton Mining and Smelting Company) refurbished the hearths and kept them working until 1893. A report in The York Herald from 1887, states that the mine had been closed in 1886, but that a new company had secured lease of 21 years with a payment of 5% dues to the crown for the mining rights.

After the mill was abandoned for lead smelting purposes, it was used as a sheep dip and a place of protection for cattle. This necessitated a new roof to be constructed in 1987. The site is a scheduled monument and the buildings, including the barrel-arched watercourse, are listed as grade II*. The whole site is known for being the best preserved lead mining and smelting site in all of the Yorkshire Dales. A further £16,000 was spent on renovating the mill in 1998; the money came from the Yorkshire Dales National Park and an EU fund.

In July 2019, flash flooding affected Wensleydale and Swaledale, with the waters of Cogden Gill sweeping away the barrel-arched watercourse that the water flowed through. The floods also destroyed a stone bridge on the road to Grinton; this was the normal route for smelter ore to leave the site. Work was undertaken in January and February 2020 to protect the edge of the main mill building from future water damage and subsidence.

== See also ==
- Grade II* listed buildings in North Yorkshire (district)
- Listed buildings in Grinton

== Gallery ==
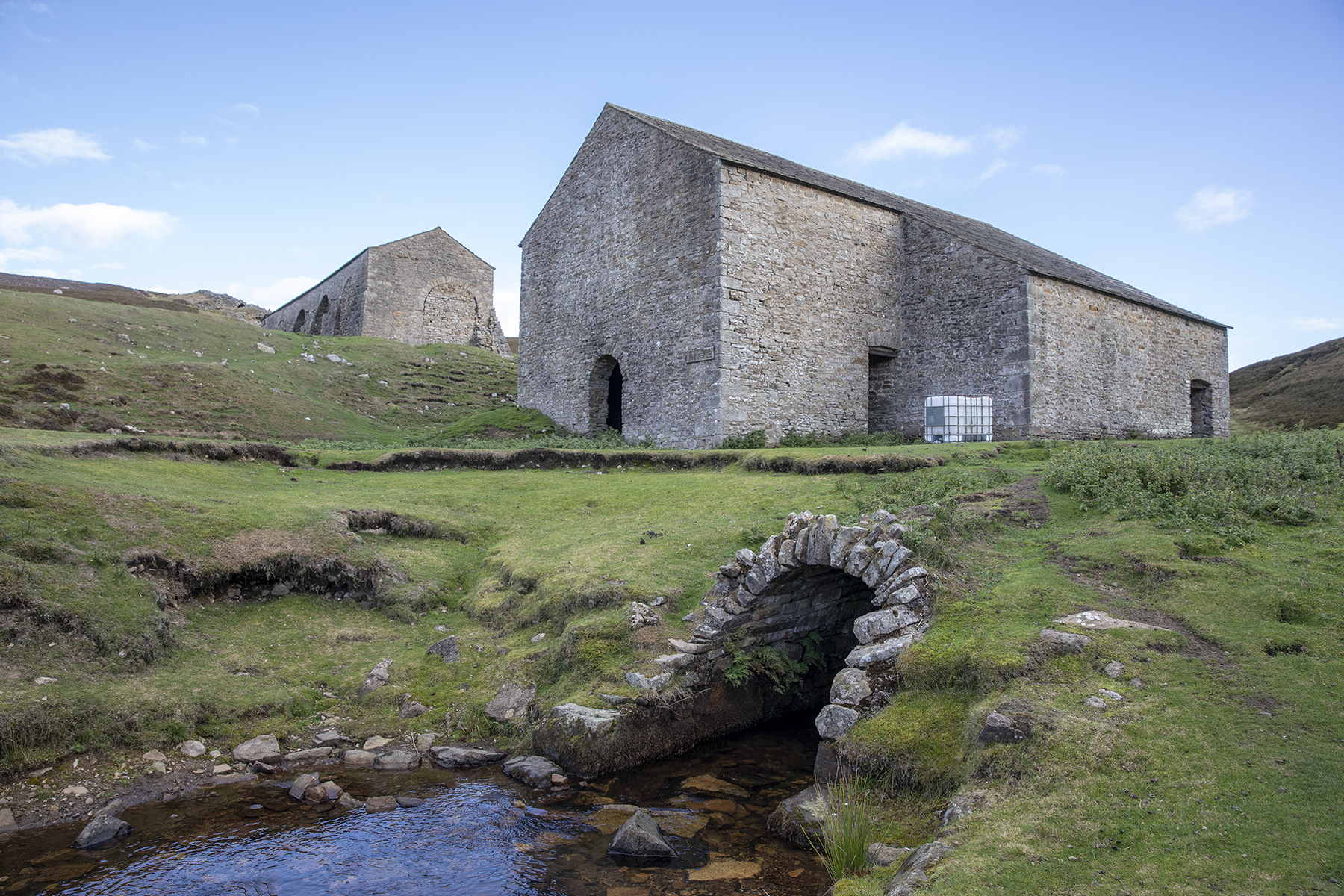
Grinton Mill and watercourse (Note: The barrel-arched tunnel which carried Cogden Gill, was washed away during the floods of July 2019.)

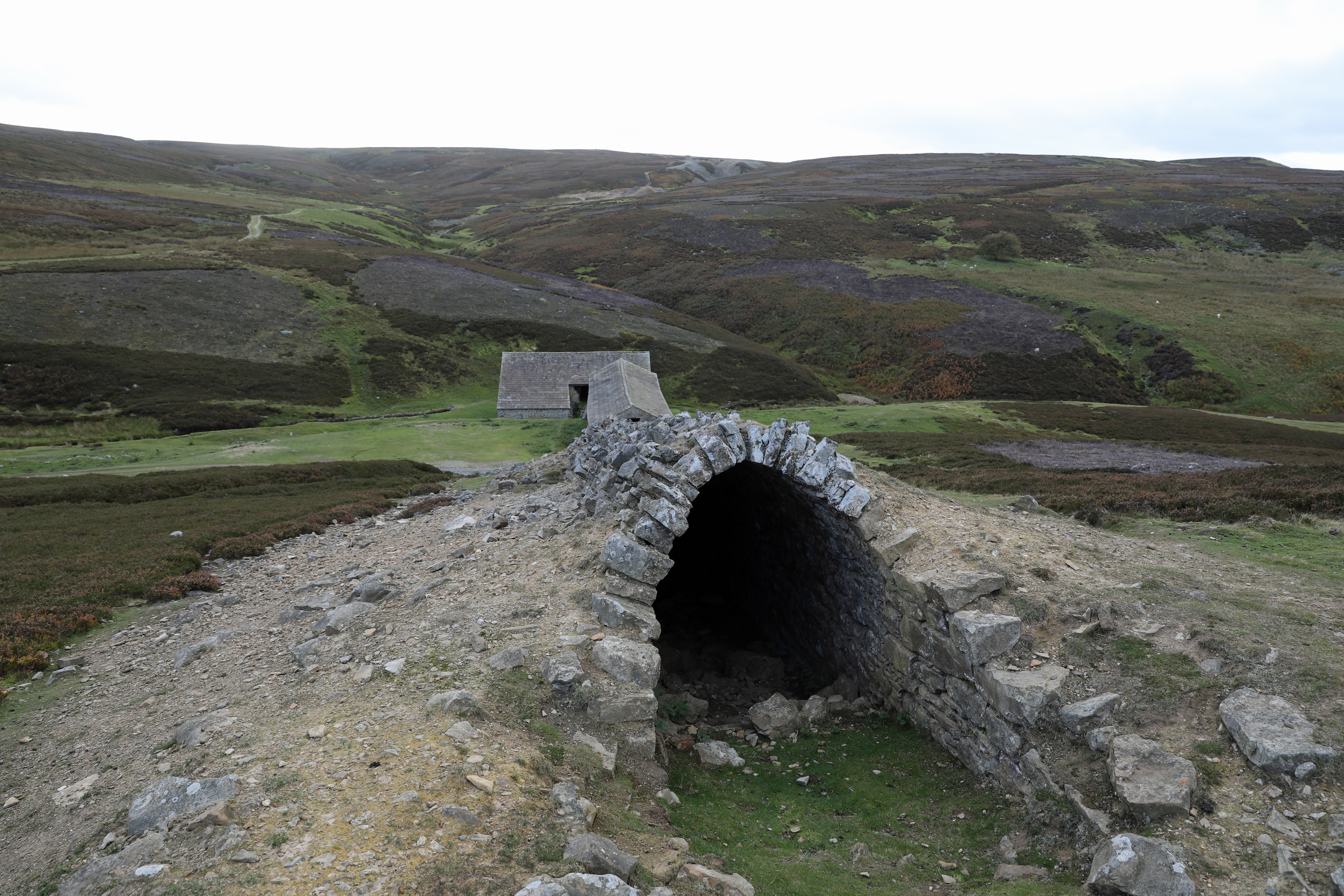
Grinton Moor Flue

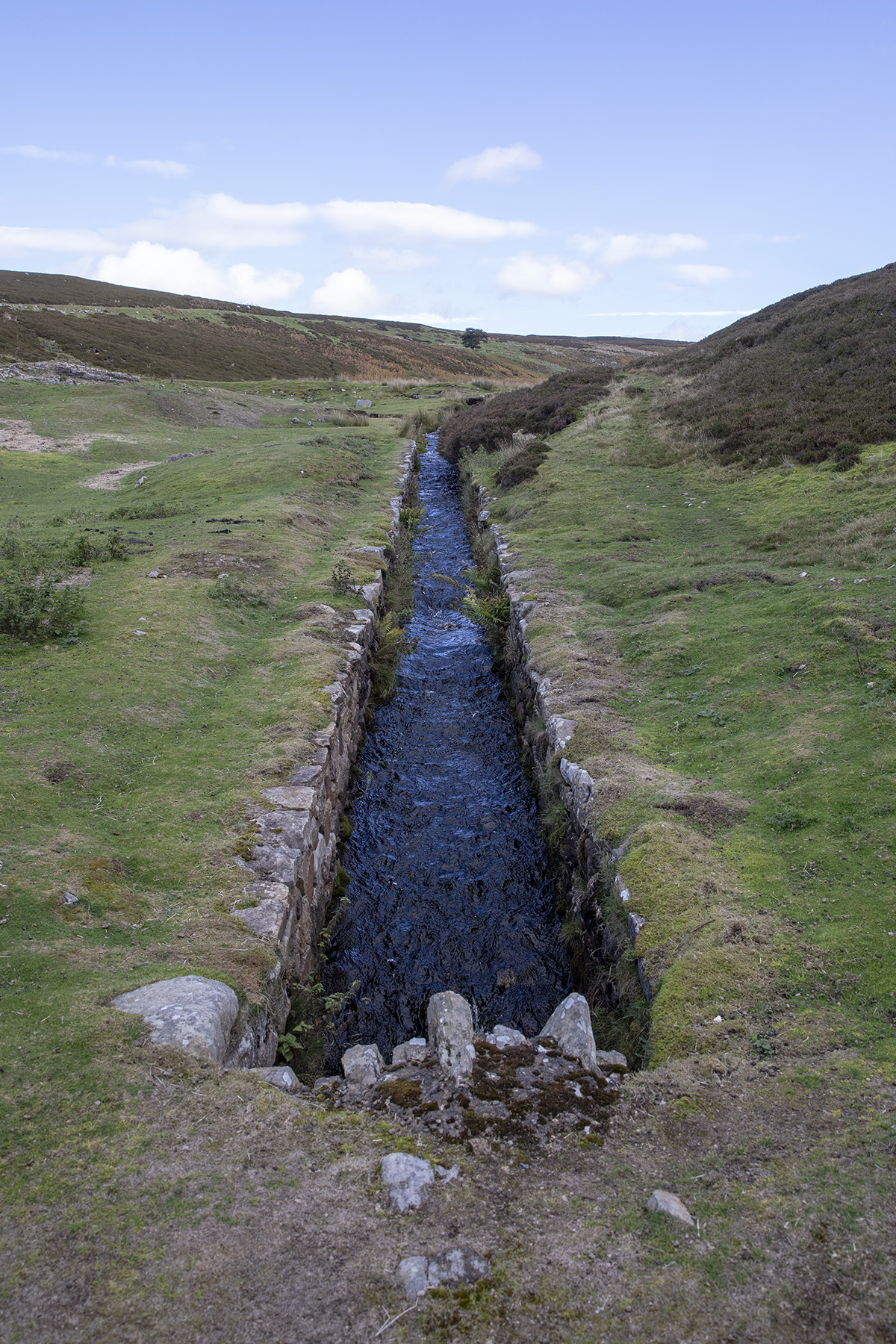
Bypass channel for Cogden Gill at Grinton smelt mill

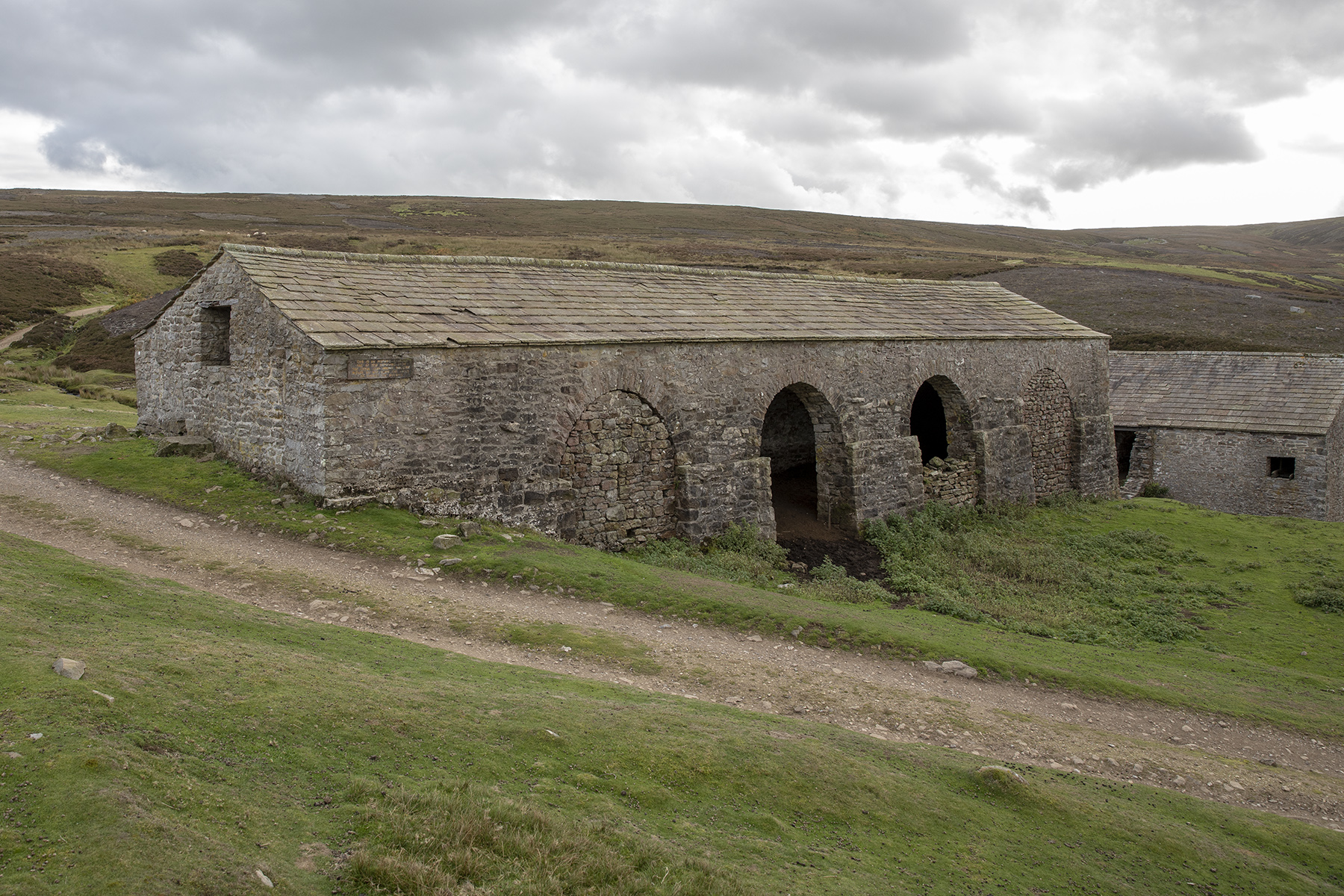
Peat store by Grinton smelt mill

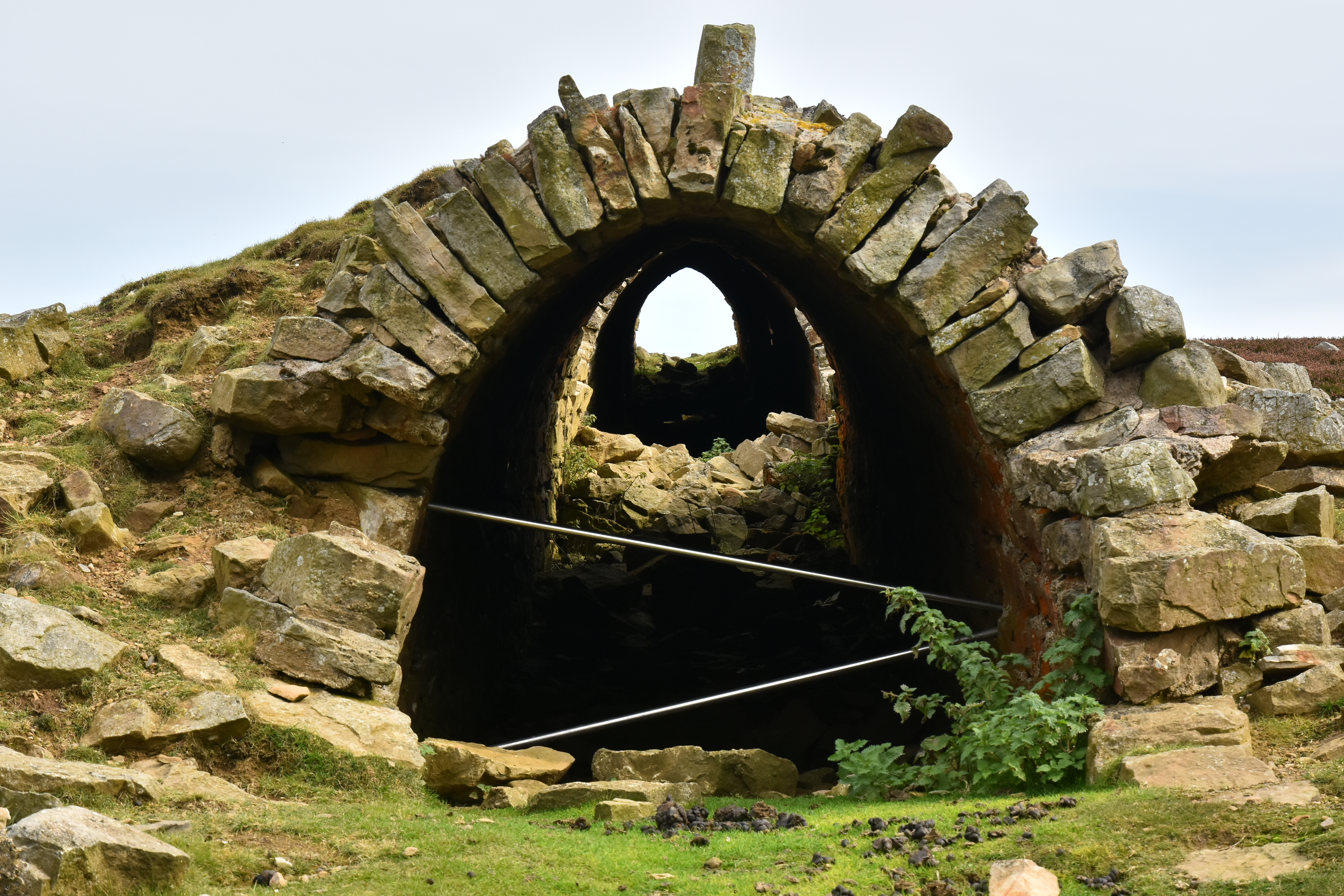
Grinton Smelting Mill Flue Leyburn North Yorkshire

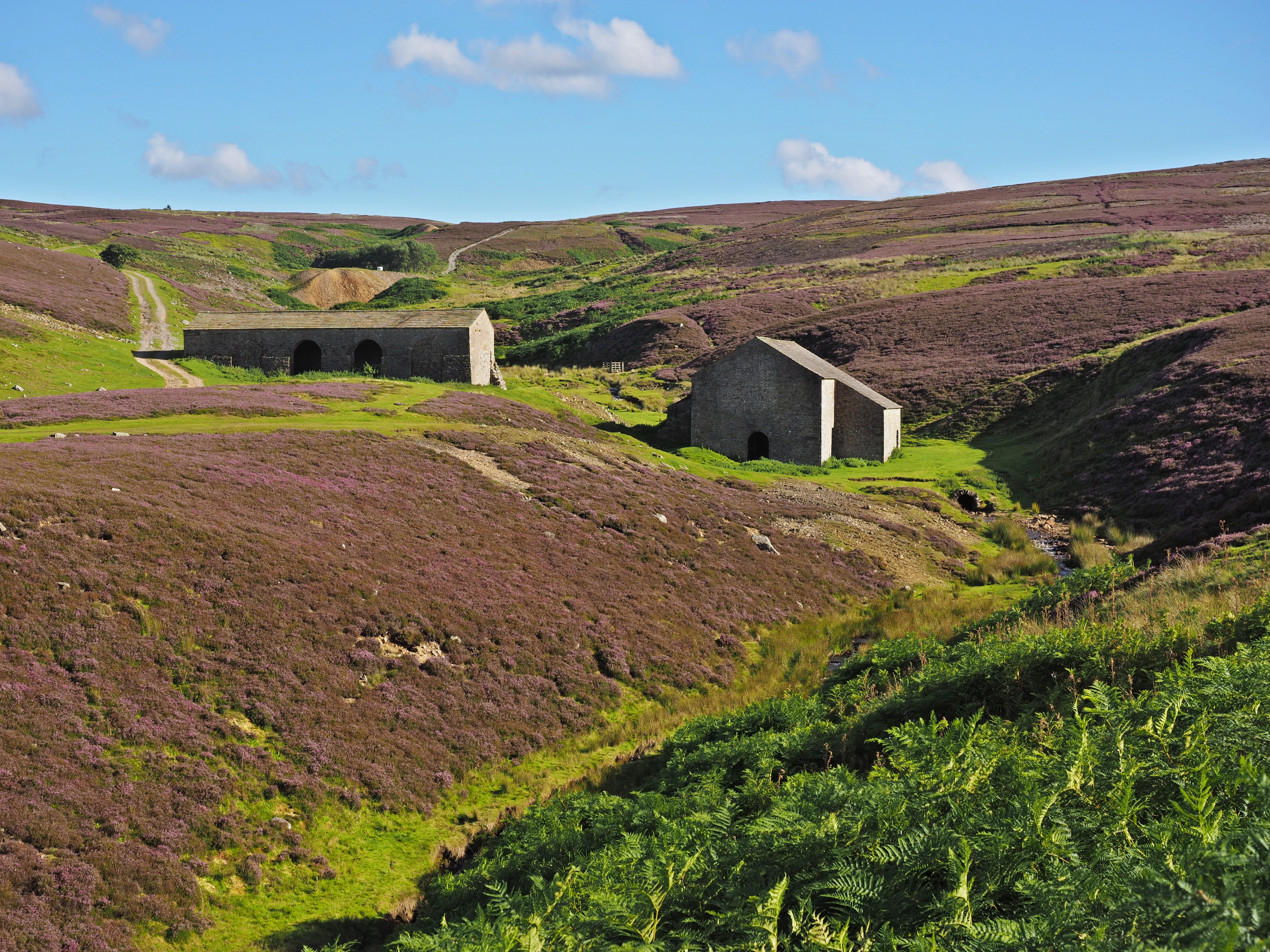
Grinton Smelting Mill
