= Crackpot, North Yorkshire =

Village in North Yorkshire, England

Coordinates: 54.36503°N 2.04257°W

Crackpot
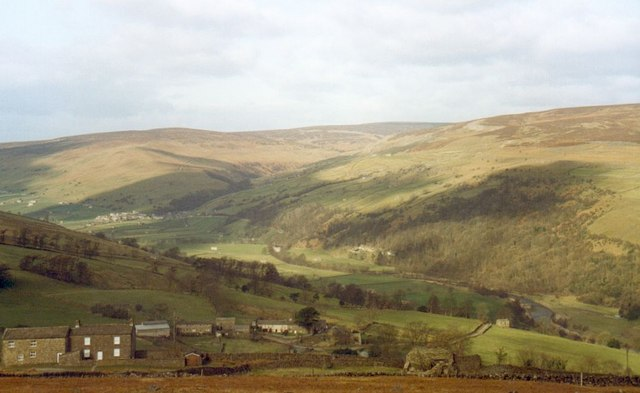
- Looking down into Swaledale from above Crackpot

- Location within North Yorkshire
- OS grid reference: SD973966
- Unitary authority: North Yorkshire
- Ceremonial county: North Yorkshire
- Region: Yorkshire and the Humber
- Country: England
- Sovereign state: United Kingdom
- Post town: RICHMOND
- Postcode district: DL11
- Police: North Yorkshire
- Fire: North Yorkshire
- Ambulance: Yorkshire

Crackpot is a village in Swaledale, North Yorkshire, England. Its name derives from the Old English kraka (crow) and the Viking word pot (usually a pit or deep hole often in the bed of a river, but in this case, it refers to a rift in the limestone).

== Crackpot Cave ==
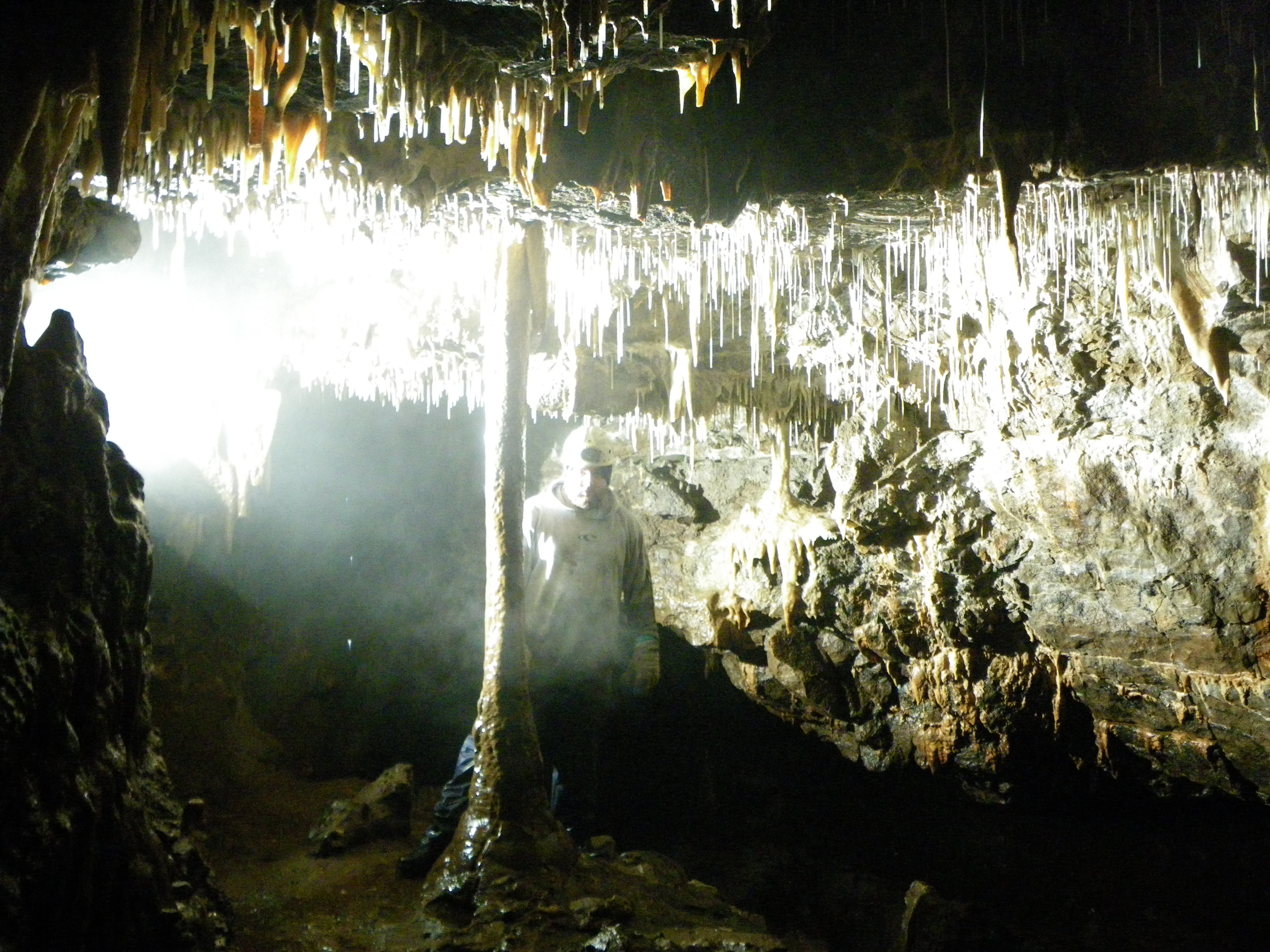
A potholer beside the column in Crackpot Cave

Located south of Crackpot in Scurvey Scar, Crackpot Cave contains a column where a stalactite has joined up with its stalagmite. It is accessible through the aptly named Knee-wrecker Passage.

== See also ==
- Listed buildings in Grinton
