= Listed buildings in Grinton =

Grinton is a civil parish in the former county of North Yorkshire, England. It contains 41 listed buildings that are recorded in the National Heritage List for England. Of these, one is listed at Grade I, the highest of the three grades, four are at Grade II*, the middle grade, and the others are at Grade II, the lowest grade. The parish contains the villages of Grinton and Crackpot, and the surrounding countryside and moorland, extending along Swaledale. Most of the listed buildings are houses, cottages and associated structures, farmhouses and farm buildings. In the parish is the former Grinton Smelt Mill, which is listed, together with two associated structures. The other listed buildings include a church and items in the churchyard, bridges and a former shooting lodge.

== Key ==
Grade	Criteria
I	Buildings of exceptional interest, sometimes considered to be internationally important
II*	Particularly important buildings of more than special interest
II	Buildings of national importance and special interest

== Buildings ==
Name and location	Photograph	Date	Notes	Grade
St Andrew's Church; 54.38129°N 1.93051°W		12th century	The church has been altered and enlarged through the centuries, and most of it is in Perpendicular style. It is built in stone with lead roofs, and consists of a nave with a clerestory on the south and a chancel, continuous north and south aisles, a chantry chapel between the chancel and the north aisle, a south porch, and a west tower. The tower has three stages, it is unbuttressed, and has stair vents, a clock face, two-light bell openings, and an embattled parapet.	I
Blackburn Hall; 54.38152°N 1.93034°W		Medieval	The house, which was remodelled in 1635, is in stone, with quoins, and a stone slate roof with stone copings and kneelers. There are three storeys, the older part forming a cross-wing to the main range of 1635, and an outshut in the angle. The main range contains a doorway with chamfered stone jambs and a four-centred arched head. Throughout there are chamfered mullioned windows and hood moulds in the form of a pediment.	II*
Grinton Bridge; 54.38216°N 1.92992°W		Mid 16th century	The bridge, which was widened and repaired in 1797 by John Carr, carries the B6270 road over the River Swale. It is in stone and consists of three semicircular arches. The bridge has triangular cutwaters rising to canted buttresses containing pedestrian retreats, voussoirs, a string course and parapets.	II
Swale Hall; 54.38139°N 1.93814°W		Late 16th century (possible)	A former manor house, it is in rendered stone on a boulder plinth, and has a stone slate roof with saddleback copings and moulded kneelers. There are two storeys, three bays, a central rear stair turret, and a cross-wing on the left projecting to the rear. In the centre is a doorway with a quoined surround, a moulded arris, a triangular soffit and a pedimented hood. Most of the windows are double-chamfered and mullioned with hood moulds, there are also single-light windows, and at the rear is a casement window. In the cross-wing is a pitching door with a hood mould.	II
Hops House and byre 54.36733°N 2.02712°W		1646	The house and byre are in stone on a plinth, with quoins and a stone slate roof. There are two storeys and the house has two bays. The main doorway is in the centre, and to the right is an earlier doorway with a chamfered quoined surround, initials and the date on the lintel, and initials on a jamb., and in the upper floor are sash windows. On the byre are steps leading to an upper floor doorway.	II
East View and Virginia House; 54.37998°N 1.92964°W		1648	A pair of stone houses with a stone slate roof. There are two storeys, five bays and rear outshuts. On the front are two doorways, the left with chamfered jambs, above which is a dated plaque. The windows are sashes, and there are the remains of chamfered mullioned windows.	II
Low Whita (Bells) Farm (east); 54.37900°N 2.00058°W		17th century	The farmhouse and farm buildings are in gritstone, with quoins, and roofs of sandstone slate roof with stone ridges. The farmhouse and attached cottage to the west have two storeys and four bays. On the front are two doorways, one blocked, and sash windows. Attached to the east is a two-bay barn or byre, and further to the east is another, later, barn with two bays. To the south is a gig house with two bays and two storeys, and attached to the cottage is a lean-to. On the south is a garden enclosed by a coped wall, and a smaller garden with railings.	II*
Low Whita (Bells) Farm (west); 54.37907°N 2.00110°W	—	17th century (or earlier)	The farmhouses and barn are in gritstone with roofs of sandstone slate. To the north is a pair of farmhouses with two storeys and a total of six bays, each with a stair turret. Both houses have a doorway with a quoined surround, the right doorway also with a decorative lintel with a date and initials, and there are also later inserted doorways. The windows vary, and include a chamfered mullioned window, fire windows, a slit window, and others that have been altered. The barn to the south has two storeys and two bays, and contains doorways, a taking-in door and slit vents.	II*
Plaintree House; 54.38136°N 1.95733°W	—	17th century	A farmhouse, later farm buildings, in stone with a stone slate roof with crude kneelers and coping. There are two storeys and two bays. On the front is a large projecting porch with a doorway and a small window. Most of the windows have been altered, and some are sashes.	II
Usha Top; 54.37643°N 2.01266°W	—	1662	The house is in sandstone, with quoins, and a stone slate roof with stone coping on the left. There are two storeys, two bays and a rear outshut. The original doorway has a chamfered quoined surround, and a deep lintel with a triangular soffit and a panel with the date. Most of the windows are sashes, and there is a chamfered mullioned window.	II
Neddy House and Cottage; 54.38064°N 1.92993°W		1663	The house and attached cottage to the left are in stone with a stone slate roof. There are two storeys, the house has three bays, and the cottage has one. In the centre of the house is a doorway with a quoined surround, a moulded arris, and a triangular soffit, and above it is an initialled and dated plaque. The windows are mullioned, the ground floor windows with hood moulds. On the middle of the three chimneys is an inscription.	II
Manor House; 54.37896°N 1.92868°W		1670	The house is in stone with quoins and a stone slate roof. There are two storeys and two bays, and at the rear is a half-outshut and two later extensions. On the front, to the right, is a gabled porch with a string course, a doorway on the left with a chamfered quoined surround, and a four-centred soffit. On the front is a mullioned window, over which is an inscribed and dated plaque. To the left are two chamfered mullioned windows, and the upper floor windows have been altered.	II
Drovers House; 54.37718°N 2.00920°W		1682	A farmhouse in whitewashed sandstone on a plinth, with quoins, and a stone slate roof with shaped kneelers and stone coping. There are two storeys, two bays and a rear outshut. In the centre is a doorway with a chamfered quoined surround, and a dated and initialled panel in the lintel. The windows are sashes, and above the ground floor openings is a continuous hood mould. Above the doorway is a blocked opening, and there is also a blocked fire window.	II
Hunt House; 54.36488°N 2.02739°W		1685	A cottage, house and barn converted into one house, in stone with a stone slate roof. There are two storeys, and the original house in the centre has three bays. In the centre is a porch, and a doorway with a quoined surround, and a lintel with a triangular soffit and a recessed panel containing initials and the date. Most of the windows are chamfered and mullioned, and at the rear is a projecting stair turret. The former barn to the right has stone steps leading to an upper floor doorway.	II
Bank Heads East and barn 54.37089°N 2.05871°W	—	1688	The house and the barn to the left are in stone, with quoins and a stone slate roof. The house has two storeys and two bays. In the centre is a doorway with a quoined surround, and a dated and initialled lintel. The windows are mixed; some are sashes. At the rear are through stones and a narrow turret.	II
Feetham Holme East; 54.37706°N 2.01347°W		1694	The house, later used for other purposes, is in sandstone, with quoins and a stone slate roof. There are two storeys and three bays. The central doorway has a quoined surround, a moulded arris, and a dated and initialled lintel. Above the doorway is a blocked window, and the other windows have been altered.	II
Bank Heads West and byre 54.37099°N 2.05941°W	—	1750	The house and byre to the left are in sandstone on a plinth, with quoins, and a stone slate roof with stone coping and a shaped kneeler on the right. There are two storeys and continuous rear outshut. The house has two bays, a central doorway with a slightly chamfered surround and a dated and initialled panel on the lintel, and sash windows. At the rear are projecting through stones. The byre contains three doorways and a pitching door above.	II
Cedar House; 54.36515°N 2.04312°W		Mid 18th century	The house is in sandstone with a stone slate roof. There are two storeys and two bays. The central doorway has interrupted jambs, and the windows are sashes, those in the ground floor with hood moulds.	II
Feetham Holme South; 54.37691°N 2.01359°W		Mid 18th century	A house and a barn later used for other purposes, th building is in sandstone with a stone slate roof. The house has two storeys and two bays, the former barn is to the right, and at the rear are the remains of a stair turret. The doorways have quoined surrounds, and the windows are sashes.	II
Feetham Holme West; 54.37702°N 2.01365°W		Mid 18th century	A house, later used for other purposes, in sandstone, with quoins, and a stone slate roof with coped gables. There are two storeys and three bays. The doorways and windows have flush stone surrounds, and at the rear is a blocked segmental-arched opening.	II
Scarr House; 54.38060°N 1.94030°W	—	Mid 18th century	A farmhouse in sandstone, with a stone slate roof, shaped kneelers and stone copings. There are two storeys and three bays. In the centre is a doorway with a pulvinated frieze and a cornice. The windows are sashes, and all the openings have architraves with hollow mouldings.	II
The Grange, outbuilding, railings and gate piers 54.37819°N 1.93064°W	—	1762	The buildings are in stone with a stone slate roof, and two storeys. The house has three bays, a doorway with a lintel containing a panel with a dated and initialled panel, and sash windows. The outbuilding to the right is lower and contains a shuttered window. In front there is a low wall containing four stone gate piers with pyramidal caps, and railings in cast iron.	II
The Post Office; 54.38178°N 1.92963°W	—	1762	A house and a cottage, later combined, in stone, with a stone slate roof, and a shaped kneeler and stone coping on the left. The openings have sandstone surrounds, the windows are sashes, and the main doorway has a lintel inscribed with the date and initials.	II
Dike House; 54.37762°N 1.94317°W	—	1773	A farmhouse in rendered stone, with a stone slate roof and stone copings. There are two storeys and two bays. The central doorway has a plain surround and a dated lintel, and the windows are sashes.	II
Clarkson memorial 54.38115°N 1.93014°W	—	Late 18th century	The memorial in the churchyard of St Andrew's Church consists of a vertical slab tombstone in pink sandstone, about 1 metre (3 ft 3 in) high and 500 millimetres (20 in) wide. At the top is a carving in half-relief of a crowned head flanked by winged putti, with cross-bones below.	II
Cogden Hall and railings 54.37654°N 1.91638°W		Late 18th century	The house is in roughcast stone with hipped stone slate roofs. There are two storeys and a U-shaped plan, consisting of a main range and two low rear wings, forming three sides of a courtyard. The main range has five bays, the middle three bays projecting as a five-sided canted bay window. The windows are sashes, those on the front with keystones, and at the rear is a tall landing window and a porch. In the left wing is a Diocletian window. The ends of the wings are joined by cast iron railings with finial heads on a round-topped plinth. These have a curved plan and a central gate.	II
Joe House and outbuilding 54.37243°N 2.06856°W	—	Late 18th century	A cottage with an outbuilding on the left, in stone, with quoins and a stone slate roof. There are two storeys, two bays, and a rear outshut. On the front are two doorways, and the windows are sashes.	II
Manor Farmhouse; 54.38078°N 1.92993°W	—	Late 18th century	The house is in sandstone, with rusticated quoins, and a stone slate roof with shaped kneelers and stone copings. There are two storeys, a double depth plan, three bays, and a single-storey extension on the left. The central doorway and the windows, which are sashes, have moulded architraves.	II
Nettlebed House and byre 54.36856°N 2.05272°W	—	Late 18th century (probable)	A farmhouse and byre under one roof, in stone with quoins and a stone slate roof. There are two storeys and two bays, and at the rear is a single-storey outshut and a stair turret. The windows are sashes, those in the ground floor with large lintels, and in the upper floor with slab lintels.	II
Robson House, byre and dairy 54.36609°N 2.03230°W		Late 18th century	A farmhouse, byre and dairy under one roof, in sandstone with a stone slate roof. There are two storeys, and the house in the centre has two bays. In the centre is a doorway with splayed bases to jambs on a plinth, and the windows are sashes. On the left is a byre with steps leading up to a doorway, and to the right is the dairy.	II
Summer Lodge Farmhouse and outbuildings 54.35683°N 2.05637°W	—	1789	The farmhouse is flanked by farm buildings, and they are in roughcast stone with a stone slate roof and two storeys. The farmhouse has three bays, a central doorway with a sandstone surround, an oblong fanlight and a hood, and the windows are sashes with sandstone surrounds. The building to the left has a cart shed opening, and a horizontally-sliding sash window in the upper floor., and both farm buildings have shuttered windows.	II
Spring End East Farmhouse and byre 54.37242°N 2.06858°W	—	1790	The farmhouse and byre are under one roof, they are in sandstone, and have a stone slate roof with stone coping, and two storeys, The house on the left has two bays, a central doorway with a lintel containing a dated and initialled panel, and the windows are sashes. The barn has two doorways on the front, and on the right return is a flight of stone steps leading up to a doorway.	II
Grinton Lodge; 54.37386°N 1.92733°W		1817	A shooting lodge, later a youth hostel, in pebbledashed stone with a stone slate roof, and embattled parapets. There are three ranges around a courtyard. The east front has two storeys, and it contains a canted bay window, three bays to the right with sash windows, and a three-storey tower with stepped diagonal buttresses. The south front has two storeys and nine bays, and on the north is a single-storey range containing mullioned windows with lintels carved with a hood mould. The approach is from the west through a segmental-arched carriage entrance.	II
Grinton Smelt Mill and watercourse 54.36331°N 1.92646°W		c. 1820	The former lead smelting mill is in stone with quoins and a stone slate roof. There is a single storey, and the mill is in two parts, forming a T-shaped plan. The south front has openings with segmental heads, and at the rear is a round-arched doorway. A barrel vaulted watercourse runs alongside the mill.	II*
Flue, Grinton Smelt Mill; 54.36396°N 1.92363°W		c. 1820	The remains of the flue are in stone, and consists of a barrel vaulted tunnel, parabolic in section, and partly collapsed. It extends from the mill buildings and runs for 300 metres (980 ft), climbing by 350 metres (1,150 ft) to a chimney, now fallen.	II
Peat store, Grinton Smelt Mill; 54.36346°N 1.92604°W		Early 19th century	The former peat store is in limestone with a stone slate roof and a single storey. There are four bays, each containing a round-headed arch, one open and the others blocked, or partly blocked. There are also four slits, a small window in the left end and a blocked round-arched opening in the right end.	II
Lawn House; 54.37145°N 2.02936°W		Early 19th century	The house is in stone, with sandstone dressings, quoins, and a stone slate roof with stone copings and kneelers like console brackets. There are two storeys, a double depth plan, and four bays. The round-headed doorway has a fanlight, and voussoirs springing from imposts, and the windows are sashes.	II
Low Houses Farmhouse and dairy 54.37156°N 2.02843°W		1840	The farmhouse and dairy are under one roof, and are in stone with a stone slate roof. There are two storeys and a rear outshut. The house has two bays, a central doorway with an inscribed and dated panel above, and sash windows. The dairy has a doorway and a window on the front, and external steps on the right gable end leading up to a doorway.	II
Coach house and stables, Cogden Hall; 54.37570°N 1.91703°W	—	Mid 19th century	The building is in stone with quoins and a stone slate roof. In the centre is a three-storey coach house, flanked by two-storey stables. The coach house contains two round-arched carriage openings, one blocked, above which is a pitching door flanked by small-pane windows with round-arched heads, and over them is a semicircular dovecote. The stables contain doors, windows and pitching holes.	II
Scabba Wath Bridge; 54.38046°N 1.99212°W		Mid 19th century	The bridge carries Low Lane over the River Swale. It is in stone, and consists of three segmental arches, with the voussoirs springing from the cutwaters. Below the parapet is a string course, and there are three shallow flood-water arches in the north abutment.	II
Gates and gate piers, St Andrew's Church; 54.38116°N 1.92978°W		c. 1896	The east entrance to the churchyard is flanked by square stone gate piers with pyramidal caps. The gates are in cast iron, and have rose motifs and spear finials. Between the piers is a wrought iron overthrow with a lantern.	II
