= Church of St Andrew, Grinton =

Anglican church in North Yorkshire, England

- St Andrew's Church
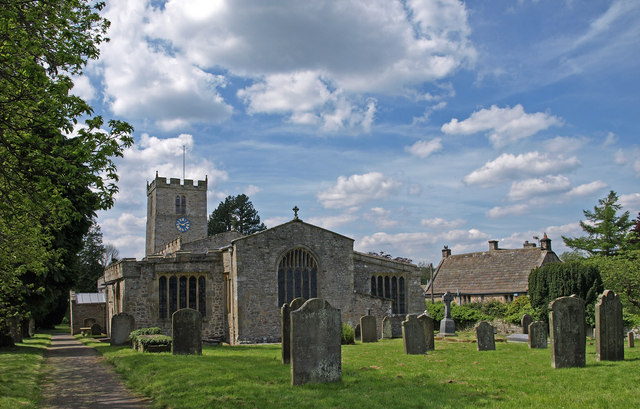
- St Andrew's Church, Grinton

- Location within North Yorkshire
- 54.3813°N 1.9304°W
- OS grid reference: SE 04614 98426
- Location: Grinton, North Yorkshire DL11 6HH
- Country: England
- Denomination: Church of England
- Website: Official website

History
- Status: Active

Architecture
- Architectural type: Norman; Perpendicular; Decorated

Administration
- Diocese: Leeds
- Archdeaconry: Richmond and Craven
- Deanery: Richmond
- Benefice: Swaledale with Arkengarthdale
- Parish: Swaledale with Arkengarthdale (460421)

Clergy
- Vicar: Caroline Joan Hewlett

Listed Building – Grade I
- Designated: 7 December 1966
- Reference no.: 1301991

The Church of St Andrew, Grinton, is the parish church for the village of Grinton in North Yorkshire, England. The grade I listed structure has also been called The Cathedral of the Dales (Note: The name Cathedral of the Dales has also been used to describe the Church of St Michael the Archangel in Kirkby Malham.), and as the only parish church in Upper Swaledale, it was at the end of the Swaledale Corpse Way, where those who had died in the upper valley, were brought for burial. Grinton never developed past village status, but its noted crossing point of the River Swale afforded it more importance than other settlements.

The church was built in the 12th century and has many alterations to its original Norman architecture. As the church was the only parish church in the area, for 400 years St Andrew's presided over the largest parish by area in Yorkshire. The church is notable for having a chained bible, a Jacobean pulpit with sounding board, and a hagioscope in the south wall. The church is also noted for being the most northerly of the "Pennine Perpendicular churches".

== History ==
The church was built in the 12th century and was given to the Augustinian Priory of Bridlington, who owned much of the land surrounding Grinton after it was given to them in early 12th century by William de Gaunt. Before the building of the church, the valley came under the same parish as Catterick, which Paulinus had established in the 7th century. Whilst there is no firm evidence of such, it is believed that a Saxon place of worship existed on the site of St Andrews, and when the church was built, it was erected on the same site. Originally, the church was staffed by the Augustinian monks, when it was referred to as Ecclesia de Swaledala, but in the late 13th century, a vicar was appointed to be the parish priest. At the dissolution, the church became an asset of the Crown until 1890, when it became the property of the Bishop of Ripon. It is now in the Diocese of Leeds.

The building has had additions placed upon it in the 13th, 14th, 15th, 16th centuries, with further modifications since then. It has a tower (facing west), a north aisle, a nave, a south aisle, a north chapel, a chancel, a south chapel, a vestry and a porch (south facing). Pevsner called St Andrews a "low, grey, spreading Perpendicular church", whilst acknowledging that it contained the original Norman architecture and also Decorated stylings too. The church is noted as being the most northerly of what has become to be termed the "Pennine Perpendicular churches." Several churches exist in the Perpendicular style in Yorkshire, but the rest of the existing churches in the Pennines are in a different style.

From the altar in the chancel, to the back of the tower, the length is 119 feet (36 m), though the main body of the church is 89 feet (27 m) in length by 54 feet 4 inches (16.56 m) in width. The church has a clerestory, but this only has windows in the south side. (Note: Glynne claims the windows are on the north side.) The nave has a Jacobean pulpit, which was fitted with a sounding board in 1718 allowing for increase audibility.

Another rarity is the hagioscope located in the south west wall. A hagioscope, also known as a squint or as a leper's squint, was used so that people could observe the process of worship without actually being there. Sometimes this was so concurrent activity with the service could be carried simultaneously, but it also allowed those with a communicable disease in the parish (such as leprosy), to witness the service without infecting the rest of the congregation. The porch has grooves in its stonework which are thought to have been cut by men who were waiting for the lords to finish their church service before going out hunting.

St Andrew's was renovated between 1895 and 1896 at a cost of £3,000, and was officially re-opened during Easter of 1896. Previous to this, the church had box pews, but these were removed in the renovations in favour of normal pews. Many of the medieval stained glass windows were kept during the renovations, although some new windows were installed, including one by Charles Eamer Kempe, which is on the east side of the church. At the same time, the bells were recast, the tower received a new clock, and the Norman font was returned to the church.

As St Andrew's was the parish church for all of Upper Swaledale, it was the only one to have consecrated ground. When the people of the upper dale (around Muker and Keld) wanted relatives burying, they had to carry the coffin the 12 miles (19 km) down to Grinton. The route is now a recognised path known as the Swaledale Corpse Road. This practice ended in 1580 when a new church was built in Muker (St Mary's) which had consecrated ground. Even so, it would be another 300 years before Muker was given a parish of its own and the overall size of the Parish of Grinton was reduced. Before this, Grinton Parish was the largest in Yorkshire for 400 years, and was historically known as Swaledale with Grinton Parish, or Grinton-in-Swaledale. As St Andrew's was the focal church in Upper Swaledale and a point of interest, it became known as The Cathedral of the Dales, a name that it is still referred to in modern times.

The church has a colony of bats living in it, and as they are protected species, despite the damage caused, the community have taken on board their protected status and used the bats as an educational tool for schoolchildren.

The church has a chained bible that was marked in 1752 with the following words; "for the use of the inhabitants of Grinton, 1752." The habit of chaining books in churches was an old custom and a way for churchwardens to allow the church to keep hold of its property. A supposed edict by Henry VIII, ordered churches to have one chained bible on show, though there are instances of this happening before The Reformation. Another order by Edward VI stated that each church should "provide within three moneths one boke of the whole bible of the largest volume in English....to be sette upp in some convenient place within the churche[sic]." Only two churches in the old North Riding of Yorkshire still had a chained bible by the turn of the 20th century; the other church was St Michael's at Kirklington.

== Listed structures ==
Besides the church itself, which is grade I listed, there are three other listed structures associated with the church.

- Blackburn Hall - grade II* listed - originally used by the monks from the Augustinian Priory at Bridlington as a house
- The Clarkson memorial in the churchyard - grade II listed
- The gates and gatepiers to the east of the church - grade II listed

== Parish and Benefice ==
St Andrew's is one of four churches in the ecclesiastical parish of Swaledale with Arkengarthdale (which is also the name of the Benefice). Weekly attendance at all four churches between 2009 and 2018 was just over 70 people across the whole parish. The other three churches in the parish and benefice are: St Mary's in Muker, Holy Trinity in Low Row and St Mary's in Arkengarthdale. The attendance statistics are drawn from all four churches, but not all have services running every Sunday.

== In popular culture ==
The church is used as a venue by some of the musical artists during the Swaledale Festival. The acoustics of the church are said to be good for performances. St Andrews also features in an episode of the television programme All Creatures Great and Small. In it, Tristan goes bell-ringing in the church.

== Clergy ==
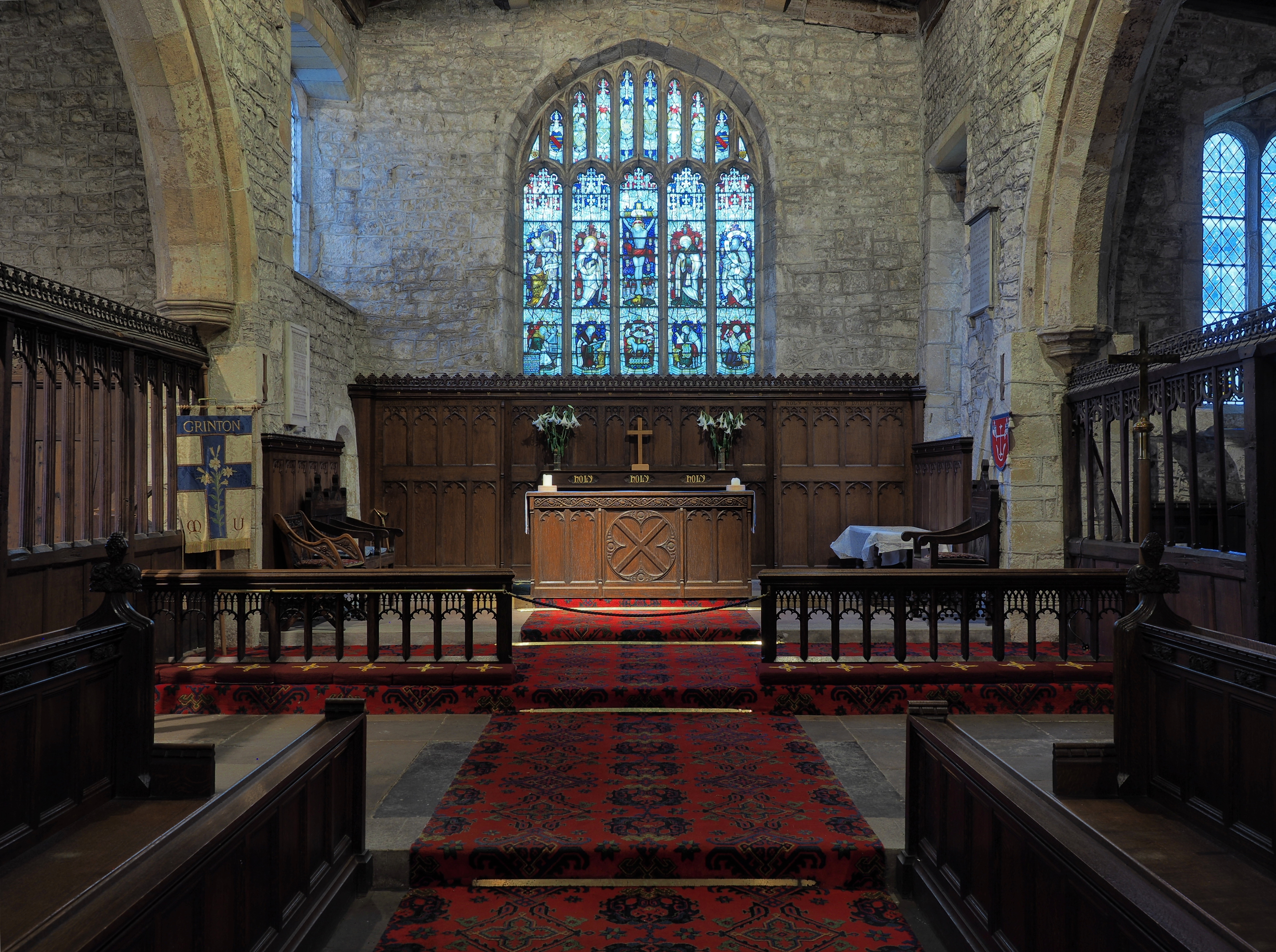
St Andrews Church, Grinton, Interior

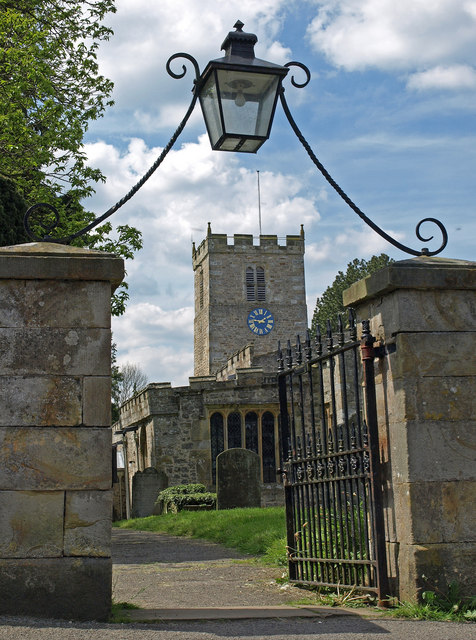
Gate to St. Andrew, Grinton

Below is a list of vicars for the Church of St Andrew, Grinton. The incumbent has also been the officiating clergy at other churches in the parish. The current incumbent is also the vicar for St Mary's, Muker, Holy Trinity at Low Row and St Mary's in Arkengarthdale.

Year	Incumbent	Year	Incumbent	Year	Incumbent
1272	Symon de Swaldal	1587	Henry Simpson	1892	David Walker (Note: Listed in some sources as David Walter.)
1278	Adam	1623	George Simpson	1899	Joseph John Merry
1362	Symon de Nesse♦	1634	Edward Norton	1907	Bertrand Gregory
1397	William de Darlington	1637	Thomas Gent (Note: Listed in the registers as Thomas Goad.)	1925	John Shaw Harrison
1411	Roger Ward	1658	Francis Atkinson	1930	Edward Norman Spear
1425	Thomas Swaldale	1673	Tobias West	1932	Gerald Farrington
1448	Roger Clyff	1717	Thomas Lightfoot	1938	Edward Somerset
1465	John Bramsfeld	1742	Timothy Dickinson (Note: Listed in the parish registers as Timothy Dickonson.)	1944	Herbert John Kingsley
1474	Nicholas Duke	1783	Thomas Jay (Note: Listed in the parish registers as Thomas Joy.)	1952	Charles William Clarke Richards
1524	John Smyth	1799	Thomas Edmondson	1959	Wilfrid Michael Case
1535	William Dowson	1822	Henry Burdett Worthington	1985	Peter Stanley Midwood
1564	Matthew Browne	1842	Elias Tardy	1998	Timothy Mark Tunley
1585	Alexander Stocks	1850	Charles Porter	2006	Caroline Joan Hewlett
1587	Henry Simpson	1855	Percy Smith		

- ♦Interregnum between incumbent and previous when dates are incorrect, period appears too long or records are incomplete.

== See also ==
- Grade I listed buildings in North Yorkshire (district)
- Listed buildings in Grinton
