= 2019–20 United Kingdom floods =

Severe flooding events in the United Kingdom over the winter of 2019–2020

2019–2020 United Kingdom floods
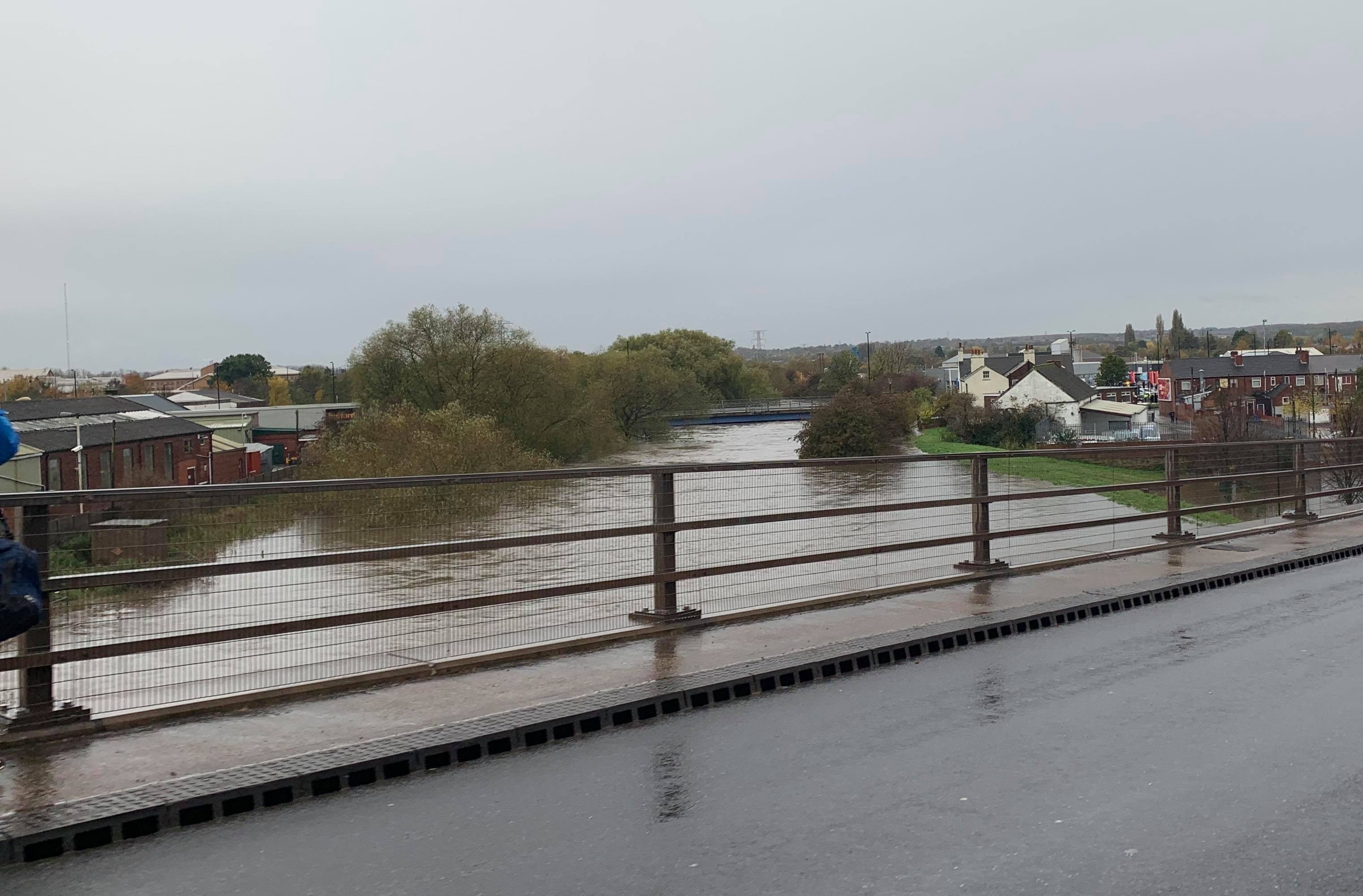
- The River Don in Doncaster, South Yorkshire overtops its banks on 8 November 2019; people had to be evacuated due to fear of the banks collapsing.
- Date: 7 November 2019 – 29 February 2020
- Location: Yorkshire and the Humber; East Midlands; West Midlands; South East England
- Deaths: 11+
- Property damage: At least £150 million

Between November 2019 and February 2020, severe winter flooding occurred across the United Kingdom. The first wave of flooding occurred in November 2019, mainly affecting Yorkshire and the Humber, the East Midlands and the West Midlands. Further isolated flooding incidents were reported in December and January, before the second main wave of flooding, caused by Storms Ciara and Dennis, occurred in February 2020. The excessive rainfall resulted in the wettest February since records began, in 1766, in England and Wales with an average of 169.6 millimetres (6.68 in) falling across the regions, beating the record from 1833.

== Background ==
Most of England received above average rainfall during October 2019, with some catchments receiving over double the average monthly total. Soils were wetter than average for the time of year across most of the country by the end of October. Monthly mean river flows were classed as exceptionally high at just over a third of indicator sites. Early on 8 November, heavy and prolonged rainfall fell on these saturated catchments across the southern Peak District causing flash floods and rivers to burst their banks. A week later on 14 November a further low pressure system brought more heavy rain to areas further south, raising water levels along on the rivers Severn and Avon.

== Mid-November - February flooding ==
=== Yorkshire and the Humber ===
==== Sheffield ====
The Met Office reported that Sheffield had 84 mm (3.3 in) of rain in just over the 36 hours which preceded the flood. This is almost the same as the monthly average for November. On 7 November Supertram services were terminated at Meadowhall South/Tinsley tram stop over fears that floodwater would put the Tinsley tram bridge in danger. On 8 November, shoppers spent the night inside Meadowhall shopping centre as floods surrounded the complex. Rain continued overnight leading to a major incident being declared in Sheffield. Millhouses public park, where in the 2007 floods a boy was swept to his death, was closed, due to concerns about the level of the River Sheaf, a tributary of the Don. On 8 November junction 34 of the M1 was closed.

Flooding throughout the regions affected rail services from Sheffield. On 7 November flooding at Denby Dale resulted in trains being unable to run between Huddersfield and Sheffield via Penistone. On 14 November train services between Sheffield and Worksop were cancelled because of floods as was the East Midlands Trains service from Sheffield to London St Pancras via the Midland Main Line. On 15 November the TransPennine Express services between Sheffield and Scunthorpe was suspended because of floods in Kirk Sandall, Doncaster. The Hope Valley Line service was also disrupted due to flooding at nearby Edale. Flooding of railway lines in Rotherham also affected train services from Sheffield.

On 17 November the Met Office reported its Sheffield weather station had recorded its wettest ever autumn, "With 15 days [of November] still to go, the site has already recorded 427.6 mm of rain. The previous record was set in 2000 with 425.2 mm of rain falling between 1 September and 30 November that year."

==== Rotherham ====
The railway tracks at Rotherham Central railway station, used by both Arriva Rail North railway services and the Sheffield Supertram tram-train, were flooded. Trains were unable to run between Sheffield and Gainsborough Central or Lincoln Central. The Sheffield to Leeds (via Moorthorpe) route was also suspended. On 7 November M1 junction 32, the M18 turn-off was reduced to two lanes due to floodwater. On 12 November flooding led to an oil spillage which led to the RSPCA having to rescue 60 swans. On 15 November it was reported that all Supertram services were operating as normal with the exception of the tram-train. Plans to switch on the Christmas lights in Rotherham were cancelled until further notice because of the floods. Rotherham Parkgate retail park was also closed because of flooding with 85% of the shops re-opening on 16 November, this later caused the temporary closure of a local Burger King.

==== Doncaster ====
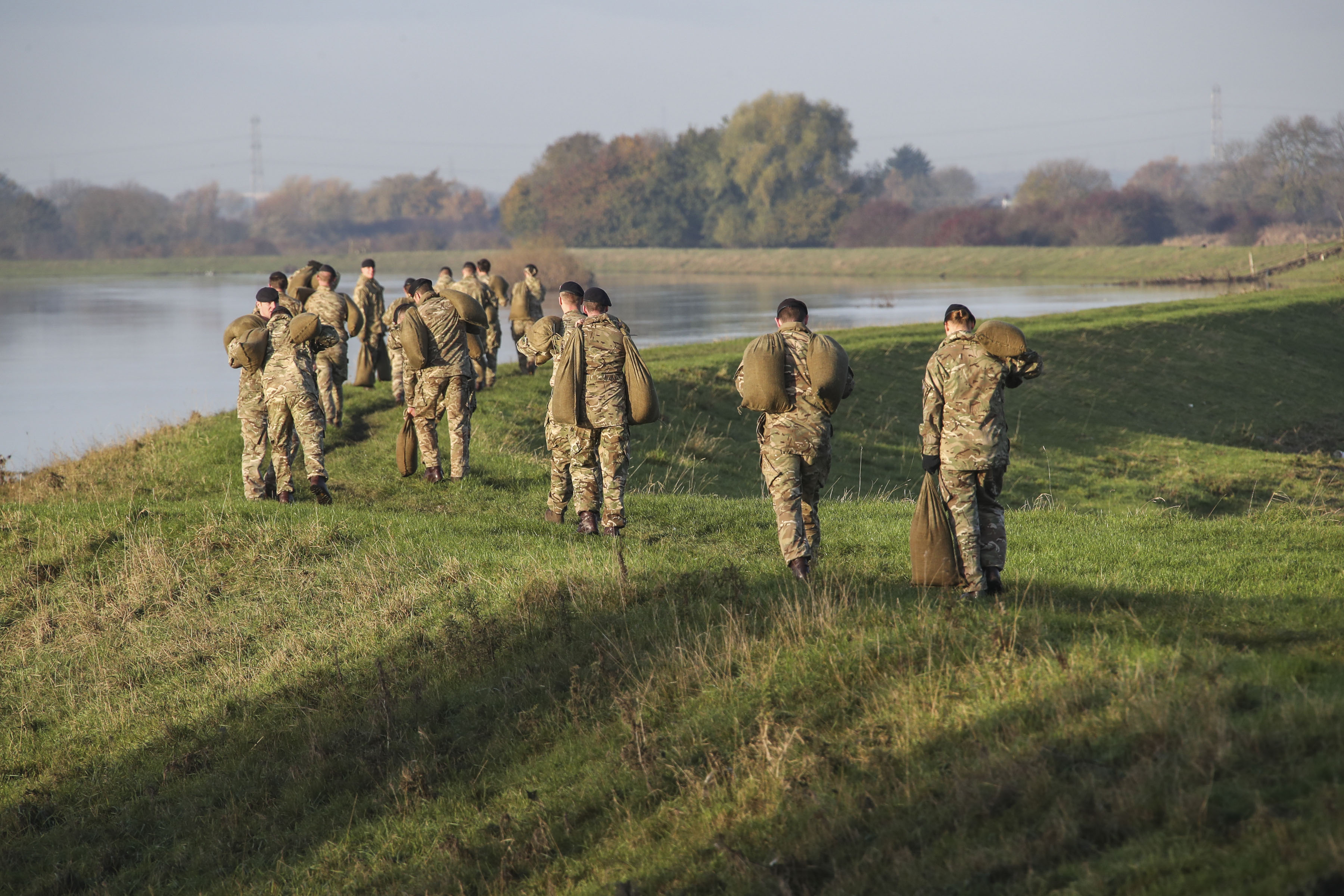
Soldiers of the Light Dragoons carry sandbags near Kirk Bramwith, South Yorkshire, 14 November

The River Don flooded in Doncaster, South Yorkshire, reaching record levels with severe flood warnings continuing into 12 November.

On 11 November there were 5 severe flood warnings in place for Kirk Bramwith, South Bramwith, Willow Bridge, Bentley and Fishlake, with residents of Fishlake, Thorpe in Balne, Trumfleet and Bentley being asked to evacuate their homes.

Fishlake local resident, Grant Berry appeared on BBC News stating, "The village had not flooded in over 100 years" as he evacuated his home.

On 11 November the Environment Agency deployed four pumps at Fishlake in an attempt to reduce the depth of flood-water and an RAF Chinook was used to convey aggregate to shore-up the banks of drainage channels east of Bentley. Fishlake residents were critical of the Environment Agency which had stated that on Friday 8 November at 5:00 pm there was no flood warning. Even when the village had flooded by 9:00 pm the Environment Agency had still not issued a flood warning. On 15 November John Curtin, executive director of flood and coastal risk management at the Environment Agency, said 38 pumps had been used in homes in Fishlake to reduce the inundation.

Arriva Rail North told customers not to travel on the Doncaster to Scunthorpe route. CrossCountry diverted its trains away from Doncaster. The floods resulted in the closure of 39 roads in the Doncaster area on 11 November.

On 15 November Doncaster Metropolitan Borough Council issued a list of 26 roads still closed due to the flood.

In the Don Valley area, Labour leader Jeremy Corbyn visited Conisborough and Doncaster and viewed the property damage with local MP Caroline Flint, calling on Prime Minister Boris Johnson to declare the floods a national emergency so immediate financial help could be provided to families in need.

==== Barnsley ====
On 7 November the River Dearne burst its banks, flooding the pub and restaurant, The Mill of the Black Monks, thought to be Barnsley's oldest pub. The building mostly dates back to 1150 AD, with some parts dating back to 700 AD. Other nearby residences were also flooded. On 7 November, within Barnsley twelve roads were closed due to floodwater. Residents and businesses in the Lundwood and Low Valley areas of Barnsley were flooded and the B6096, Station Road at Wombwell was affected by severe flooding. On 15 November three roads remained closed due to floodwater, New Road (from Tingle Bridge Lane junction to the roundabout at Lions Lodge) and Smithy Bridge Lane at Hemingfield, and Birds Nest Lane at Penistone.

==== Hull ====
On 14 November run-off from fields closed the A63, the only link between Hull and the M62 motorway. The road re-opened on 15 November although a significant number of roads remained closed in the Hull area, including sections of the A164.

==== Leeds and West Yorkshire ====
On 8 November flooding of railway lines on part of the East Coast Mainline led to delays on the Leeds to London service, with all LNER electric locomotive hauled services being cancelled. At least seven roads in West Yorkshire were closed, including the M606 Northbound main carriageway at junction 3, part of the A641 and some of the A646 Halifax to Burnley route. The moveable weir at Knostrop, part of the River Aire flood alleviation scheme, was lowered to reduce the water level upstream.

=== East Midlands ===
==== River Derwent and Derbyshire ====
The Derwent flooded, and parts of Matlock were submerged as a month's worth of rainfall fell in a day. A woman swept away when wading through fast moving floodwaters and found dead later the same day was named as a former High Sheriff of Derbyshire, Annie Hall. During a visit to Matlock, Boris Johnson, the British prime minister said the floods were "not like something we need to escalate to the level of a national emergency".

On 12 November a number of car parks at Chatsworth House were closed, with access to the Christmas market restricted to pre-booked customers and 'Friends of Chatsworth'. Also on 12 November, flooding at Edale led to the closure of the Hope Valley rail service from Sheffield to Manchester Piccadilly. Services resumed later that day.

On 14 November the railtracks at Draycott flooded, leading to delays on journeys from Derby to Long Eaton on the Midland Main Line, and the Matlock to Newark Castle lines were also affected.

==== River Trent and Nottinghamshire ====
On 7 November the River Ryton burst its banks resulting in major incidents being declared in Worksop. Residents and Bassetlaw District Council leader, Simon Greaves, were critical of the Canal and River Trust (CRT) for not opening The Canch sluice gate. This sluice feeds excess water to the Chesterfield Canal via a channel. The sluice was eventually opened by a firefighter. The initial response of the CRT to requests to open the gate was to say no flood alert had been issued for the Ryton, according to a resident of the Riverside Caravan Park. When CRT engineers visited the sluice gate they refused to enter the building housing the sluice, saying the building was 'unsafe'. The CRT is responsible for the sluice gate though the building is owned by the council. On 15 November the CRT released a statement stating that the sluice was not designed to drain the river. It said "Definitively, it would not have alleviated the flooding in the town. The water would have stayed in the area as the feeder, canal and river all run in parallel a very short distance apart".

Residents of mobile homes in Newark were evacuated on 9 November over fears that the River Trent would burst its banks. The Environment Agency issued a flood warning for Retford and moved pumps into the Retford Beck area in an attempt to prevent the flooding of homes. In Mansfield the heavy rain also caused a mudslide which resulted in 35 homes being evacuated.

Transport was affected in the county with road and rail closures. East Midlands Railway services on the Nottingham to Mansfield and Worksop routes were disrupted due to flooding on the railway line. More than seven roads were closed in the Nottinghamshire area. The rail service between Shirebrook and Worksop, on the Robin Hood Line was also disrupted. On 14 November East Midlands Railway said a flooded railway line near Loughborough had disrupted services between Lincoln, Nottingham and Leicester. The bus operator, Nottingham City Transport reported that flooding had affected fourteen of its routes, with some bus stops not being served.

==== Lincolnshire ====
More than 1,000 acres (400 ha) in Lincolnshire were underwater when the Barlings Eau burst its banks. Twelve flood warnings were issued in the county and some farms were cut off. About 30 residents were evacuated from the Short Ferry Caravan Park near to Bardney, which is close to the Barlings Eau.

On 8 November homes in the Cherry Willingham area of Lincoln were inundated as the River Witham burst its banks, and the area around the Brayford Pool in the centre of Lincoln was flooded. A number of roads were closed in the county including parts of the A1 (northbound), parts of the A46 and parts of the A631.

Bransby Horses, an animal sanctuary near Lincoln, was told by the Environment Agency to close their drain valves and flood their site. The sanctuary, which is located on the River Till washlands has long-standing agreement with the agency to do so in order to reduce flooding in Lincoln. The washlands help protect 7,000 homes and businesses in and around Lincoln. The Bransby Horses site has seen human sewage and four feet of water on their fields with 40% of the grazing land unsafe for at least the next six months (from November 2019). Over one hundred of the four hundred and fifty horses, donkeys, ponies and mules were moved to the sanctuary's site in Barlings, which was bought specifically to deal with emergency evacuations of the Bransby site.

In Grimsby the River Freshney reached record levels flooding homes in nearby Healing. Riverhead pumping station, operated by Associated British Ports attempted to pump as much of the Freshney's water into Alexandra Dock as was possible using all three Archimedes screws at the pumping station simultaneously.

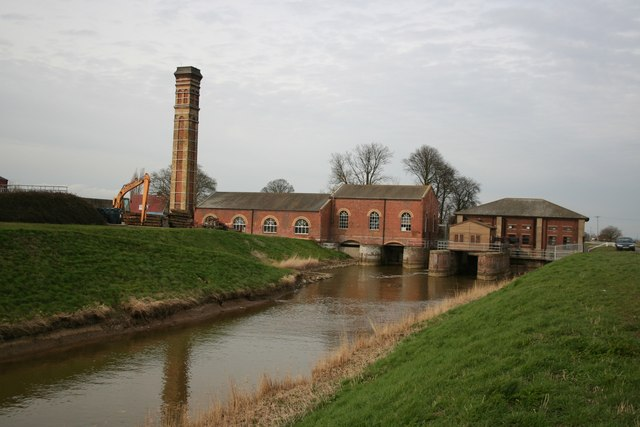
Lade Bank pumping station

On 14 November nine roads in Lincolnshire remained closed because of flooding. On the same day an embankment supporting Fodderdyke Bank, a road at New Leake, near Boston, collapsed into the adjacent drain. The drain takes excess rainfall to pumping stations at Lade Bank and Hobhole where it is discharged into The Wash. Peter Bateson, Chief Executive at Witham Fourth District Internal Drainage Board said, "We are seeing many slips in the area, but the one at Fodderdyke is the largest." Work to repair the embankment, which requires a specialist piling tool as the bedrock is so hard, is expected to be finished by mid-December.

By 15 November Environment Agency data from monitoring station at Brigg had recorded 104.6 mm of rainfall since 1 November, more than twice the 50 mm average for the month. Both the New River Ancholme (constructed in 1635) and the Old River Ancholme had over-topped their banks flooding parts of Brigg. Fifty homes across North Lincolnshire were flooded, according to figures released by North Lincolnshire council.

=== West Midlands ===
==== Birmingham ====
On 14 November the River Cole burst its banks causing flooding in the Hall Green area. West Midlands Railway services between Birmingham Snow Hill and Stratford-Upon-Avon were cancelled. On the same day British Transport Police, Network Rail and staff at Birmingham New Street station advised passengers not to travel by rail unless it was absolutely necessary.

==== Shropshire ====
On 14 November in Shropshire nine schools were closed because of floods. The Environment Agency issued three flood warnings for the county, two on the River Severn and one on the River Teme. Sections of the A49 and A488 were closed as were a number of minor roads, particularly in the south of the county. On 15 November four schools remained closed.

On 15 November rail services between Shrewsbury and Welshpool did not run due to flooding.

==== Herefordshire ====
On 14 November the A438 at Portwaym was flooded with the local authority asking drivers to avoid it if possible and the A417 at Maund Bryan was closed after cars became stranded in floodwater. Eighteen schools in Herefordshire were closed due to the floods. West Midlands Trains reported that the railway line between Great Malvern and Hereford was closed because of flooding. A landslip led to the closure of the B4234 between Kerne Bridge and Walford. On 14 November the Environment Agency issued flood warnings on all rivers in Herefordshire and the Lugg, the Teme and the Frome burst their banks, affecting a small number roads in the north of the county. Settlements affected by flooding included the Greyfriars area, Leintwardine, Walford, Little Hereford, Ashford Carbonel, Ross-on-Wye and Hereford with the A4103 and A4113 roads also affected.

==== Worcestershire ====
On 14 November Worcestershire County Council closed sixty-one schools because of the floods. The Environment Agency deployed a pump at Upton-upon-Severn, Worcestershire, to remove standing water. Parts of the A38 were closed in both directions at Stoke Heath because of flooding. A mudslide occurred on the road at Wilden Lane, Stourport-on-Severn although the road remained open. In Wychavon, on 14 November thirty-eight roads were closed, including parts of the, A44, A449 and A4133, with one road at Hartlebury being closed due to a mud slide. In Malvern twelve Roads were closed, in Redditch seven were closed and a further five closed in Bromsgrove.

On 14 November West Midlands Trains' services between Worcester and Birmingham were cancelled because of flooding in Bromsgrove.

On 15 November train services between Moreton-in-Marsh and Worcester Shrub Hill did not run because to flooding. Floods caused major disruption to transport on 15 November with over 125 roads being closed in Worcestershire, including sections of the A38, A44, A442, A443, A448 and A449. Bus services between Tenbury and Worcester were cancelled as were many school bus services. In Evesham, river levels were at their highest since the 2007 United Kingdom floods. The Environment Agency reported that between twenty-five and thirty properties close to the Avon in Evesham were flooded. On 16 November over twenty-five roads remained closed throughout the county. The Three Counties Farming Conference at the Three Counties Showground, Malvern was cancelled on 15 November due to road conditions.

==== River Avon and Warwickshire ====
On 14 November in Sambourne, near Coughton, in Warwickshire vehicle drivers had to be rescued from flood water. Flooding on the tracks disrupted rail services to Leamington Spa. Twenty-seven schools across the county were closed on 14 November due to flooding. On 14 November the Shipston river gauge on the River Stour reached a high level which prompted the Environment Agency to issue flood alerts for Halford, Crimscote, Alderminster, Preston-on-Stour, Ailstone, Atherstone-on-Stour and Clifford Chambers. The Agency said three flood warnings have been issued for the River Dene and Stour with a total of 20 flood alerts in place in the county.

On 15 November the River Avon broke its banks causing flooding across Warwickshire and Worcestershire. The Environment Agency issued flood warnings for Stratford-upon-Avon, Evesham, Bidford-on-Avon, Warwick, and Leamington Spa. In Stratford-upon-Avon, temporary flood barriers were installed near the town centre. Floodwater reached the road outside Anne Hathaway's Cottage in Shottery, Stratford-upon-Avon.

=== South East England ===
==== Oxfordshire ====
On 14 November the CrossCountry trains services to Banbury were affected by surface water on the line to Leamington Spa. Oxfordshire County Council announced that flooded roads were impassable between Woodeaton, Elsfield, and Marston, and that the road between Waterperry and Worminghall was flooded. Vehicle drivers were turned away from Wendlebury due to flood water. On 14 November there were 20 flood alerts in place across the county.

On 14 November flood alerts were issued for the River Thames and River Cherwell through Oxford.

==== Buckinghamshire ====
Surface water flooding in the Beachampton area of Buckinghamshire led to vehicles being stranded.

=== South West England ===
==== Gloucestershire ====
On 14 November nine roads were closed in the county, with many more affected by surface water flooding. The 15 November races at Cheltenham Racecourse were abandoned due to the rainfall. By 16 November the number of closed roads had risen to fourteen. The River Avon and River Severn burst their banks in Tewkesbury flooding a number of properties. Twelve roads remained closed on 17 November, with the B4234 at Kerne Bridge being closed due to a landslip.

== December flooding ==
Flooding was reported across southern England from 18 to 22 December, caused by repeated intense cold fronts moving across the area, accumulating high rainfall totals. In total, 91 flood warnings and 237 flood alerts were issued by the Environment Agency. In many areas, more than 50 mm (2.0 in) of rain fell in less than 36 hours. Flooding caused widespread travel disruption during the pre-Christmas rush, which is traditionally the busiest time of year for public transport in the United Kingdom.

In Buckinghamshire, there were reports of cars becoming stranded on flooded roads, and a mother and her three sons had to be rescued from a stranded vehicle. The River Great Ouse burst its banks in St Ives, Cambridgeshire. Flooding was also reported in Reading after the River Loddon burst its banks and the River Thames reached high levels. Great Western Railway and South Western Railway (2017-2025)South Western Railway services were suspended between Guildford and Godalming after a collapsed embankment blocked a tunnel entrance. Minor surface flooding of roads and railways was also reported in Norfolk and Suffolk.

The M23 motorway was closed in both directions between junctions 10 and 11 in West Sussex after becoming blocked by floodwater. In neighbouring East Sussex, the River Cuckmere burst its banks and fast-flowing floodwaters inundated the village of Alfriston, causing severe damage including washing away parked cars; the Brighton Main Line railway was also closed as a result of flooding, affecting Govia Thameslink Railway services. The River Medway in Kent burst its banks, flooding the town of Maidstone and nearby Yalding and Teston. In Yalding, visitors to a caravan site were rescued by boat after it became cut-off by rising waters. Trains operated by Southeastern between Maidstone West and Strood, and between Tunbridge Wells and Hastings, were suspended as a result of downed trees, track damage and electricity failures.

In South West England, the Somerset Levels witnessed widespread flooding. Up to 53 mm (2.1 in) of rainfall was recorded in Devon and Cornwall, causing serious flooding in numerous towns and villages, particularly Hayle where a major incident was declared by police. Up to 60 properties in Hayle were flooded. Roads including the main A30 and railways including Great Western Railway services between Exeter St Davids and Taunton were closed or suspended, isolating much of the region from the rest of the country for several days.

=== Chertsey tornado ===
2019 Chertsey tornado
Meteorological history
- Formed: 21 December 2019, 10:30 GMT
- Duration: ~10 minutes

F1 tornado
- on the Fujita scale

Overall effects
- Areas affected: Chertsey, Surrey

A weak tornado was reported in Chertsey, Surrey on 21 December; it was filmed by a vehicle dashcam crossing both carriageways of the M25 motorway before striking a residential area, damaging homes, gardens and vehicles. Several houses suffered severe roof damage as a result of the tornado and many cars were damaged beyond repair. Subsequent damage assessment rated the tornado as an F1 on the Fujita scale according to the European Severe Weather Database.

== Storm Dennis (15–19 February) ==
=== East Midlands ===
By daybreak on 16 February, severe flooding was reported across the East Midlands, including Ilkeston and Lowdham; a major incident was declared by the local council in the latter village. Across Leicestershire, dozens of roads were flooded. In Loughborough, the River Soar and its tributary the Wood Brook both burst their banks, flooding residential areas of the town. Flooding was also reported in nearby Sileby, where the flood siren was sounded. Flooding near Draycott in Derbyshire resulted in the temporarily closure of the Midland Main Line between Derby and Long Eaton, affecting East Midlands Railway services between Sheffield and London St Pancras. The Nottingham City Transport bus depot at Gotham was flooded, disrupting some routes as they had to be operated out of the company's other garages; further flooding in the Nottingham area, including in Woodborough, compounded disruption to their services as well as those of rival operator Trentbarton. Flooding of homes was also reported in nearby Rainworth and Radcliffe-on-Trent.

Later on 16 February, the main road through the Derbyshire village of Repton was closed after floodwaters made it impassable, and passing cars had been splashing water into homes and businesses. There was also some minor flooding from the River Derwent in Derby itself, including at the Derby Rugby Club. Pumps were deployed to protect the town of Retford from flooding.

=== London & South East England ===
At around 07:30 local time on 16 February, the 06:41 Thameslink service from Cambridge to Potters Bar, operated by a Class 700 unit, struck a tree on the railway that had been downed by high winds near Royston in Hertfordshire. There were no injuries in the incident, and the train suffered only minor damage. The tree was removed by 08:45, allowing the train to continue to its destination, after which it was taken out of service and returned to the depot for safety inspections. Rail services subsequently resumed on the Thameslink line with heavy delays due to storm-related speed restrictions as a safety precaution following the Royston incident.

In the London area, adverse weather conditions resulted in the postponement of the Women's FA Cup football matches between Arsenal and Lewes and between Crystal Palace and Brighton & Hove Albion; the latter is contested as the M23 derby. In the New Forest area of Hampshire, a DPDgroup delivery van was washed away from a swollen ford, with the driver making a lucky escape after the van became lodged under a tree. In nearby Romsey, temporary flood barriers were erected to protect more than 200 at-risk properties from flooding.

=== South West England ===
Severe flooding was reported in the Dartmoor area on 16 February, with the surrounding towns and villages of Bovey Tracey, Heathfield, Newton Abbot, Littlehempston and Highweek particularly affected. Part of the South West Coast Path near Swanage in Dorset was closed after it was blocked by a landslide, and nearby cliffs were deemed to be dangerously unstable.

=== Wales ===
Storm Dennis brought historic flooding to South Wales, particularly to areas of the Valleys covered by the Met Office red severe weather warning for rain; many areas saw more than a month's worth of rainfall within a period of less than 48 hours. In Maerdy, Rhondda, more than 160 mm (6.3 in) of rain was recorded in a 48-hour period starting at midday on 14 February. As a result of widespread serious flooding and landslides, South Wales Police declared a major incident across the region, and the South Wales Fire and Rescue Service responded to more than 1,400 calls in a 12-hour period. Hundreds of homes and businesses were damaged, and one person was killed after falling into the River Tawe near Swansea.

Natural Resources Wales issued two severe flood warnings, meaning an imminent danger to life was occurring, during the course of Storm Dennis – these covered the River Neath around Aberdulais and the River Taff around Pontypridd. More than 80 lower-level flood warnings were issued across Wales. Large-scale evacuations of villages in the River Usk and River Wye floodplains were co-ordinated by emergency services on 16 February in anticipation of serious flooding. Further evacuations took place in Monmouthshire and Neath Port Talbot, with the entire village of Tonna being evacuated by bus. The levels of the River Wye at Monmouth reached a record high on 18 February. At Whitebrook beside the Wye, a woman was rescued after spending 12 hours on the roof of her submerged car. Hundreds of people were evacuated from Nantgarw. Emergency services were also stretched by the need to carry out rescues from vehicles and properties as people were caught out by rapidly rising floodwaters, including from homes in Crickhowell, Powys. Additionally, the main road bridge in Crickhowell was severely damaged.

Severe flooding occurred in the town of Pontypridd and in parts of Cardiff as the River Taff reached its highest level in recorded history, flooding homes and businesses and disrupting transport. Houses in Pontypridd were inundated by more than 5 feet (1.5 m) of water, with residents being rescued from the upper floors; riverside walls collapsed and parked vehicles were washed away, adding damaging debris to the fast-flowing waters and exacerbating the situation in Pontypridd. The town centre was completely inundated, and a major emergency was declared across the wider Rhondda Cynon Taf council area.

Some of the other badly affected settlements were Cwm in Blaenau Gwent and Argoed in Caerphilly, where emergency services spent considerable time unsuccessfully trying to pump floodwaters away from houses. Further flooding of homes and businesses was reported in the settlements of New Tredegar, Bedwas, Newbridge, Risca and Llanbradach. Transport for Wales reported severe disruption to rail services across Wales and beyond into England, including key routes from Cardiff Central, Aberystwyth, Holyhead and Carmarthen to Birmingham New Street and Manchester Piccadilly.

In addition to flooding, dozens of landslides were reported across Wales. Debris from landslides in the upper valleys, including mud and large rocks, was carried down into the town of Mountain Ash by floodwaters, worsening the damage from flooding there. In Tylorstown, a large mudslide on a steep hillside above the village was caught on video; on the other side of the same mountain in Llanwonno, more than 300 m (980 ft) of hillside suddenly collapsed, damaging telecommunications equipment.

=== West Midlands ===
Flooding started causing issues across the West Midlands on 16 February, when a major incident was declared in Worcestershire as rising waters swept a woman into the River Teme near Tenbury in her vehicle; severe flooding hampered the search for her, and her body was found downstream several days later. A man was also swept into the Teme near Tenbury Wells, but was later rescued; more than 130 homes in the village were flooded, where waters peaked higher than the previous historic floods of 2007. In Hereford, the River Wye reached its highest level in recorded history, and the major incident declaration was subsequently expanded to cover Herefordshire and Shropshire. Across Herefordshire, landslides and high river levels damaged roads and bridges.

In Ludlow, Shropshire, more than 50 homes were flooded. Properties were also flooded in the centre of Shrewsbury as the River Severn burst its banks. The Environment Agency described the flooding across parts of the West Midlands as "unprecedented", and warned that excess runoff from the upper reaches of the Severn in Wales meant that the flooding in the lower Severn valley would likely be prolonged for at least three days.

=== Yorkshire and the Humber ===
In Bradford on 16 February, the M606 motorway was closed in both directions due to flooding on one of the carriageways, which persisted despite efforts overnight to pump the road clear. Flooding in the Calder Valley, which had been severely impacted by Storm Ciara the weekend before, was less than initially anticipated. The River Calder rose to very high levels but did not break its banks in Todmorden, Hebden Bridge or Mytholmroyd, unlike the previous weekend, and only minor surface water flooding was reported across Calderdale in general. Voluntary flood wardens in the Calder Valley described it as "an unexpectedly steady night".

There was flooding in Boroughbridge as the River Ure peaked at 15.12 m (49.6 ft), breaking its banks in several places. In the Leeds area, new flood defences were operated for the first time on the River Aire at Crown Point and Knostrop, considerably lowering the level of the river in a short period of time and reducing the flooding risk for the city; these particular defences were built at a cost of £50 million, protecting more than 3,500 vulnerable homes and businesses.

Flooding was reported in the Sheffield area. Surface water flooded sliproads onto the Sheffield Parkway in Handsworth, which then had to be closed as a car became stranded in the water. River levels were very high, especially along the River Don, resulting in some minor riverside flooding in the Lower Don Valley between the city centre and Meadowhall. In Rotherham, the Don and Rother burst their banks, flooding the railway around Rotherham Central station and resulting in the suspension of Arriva Rail North and Sheffield Supertram services. Additionally, the Snake Pass road to Manchester was closed as a result of landslides.

== Response ==
On 11 November Prime Minister Boris Johnson called a Cobra meeting over the governments response to the flooding which came after leader of the opposition, Jeremy Corbyn sent a letter to Johnson calling on him to hold a Cobra meeting. On 13 November the Prime Minister visited Stainforth, South Yorkshire, as 100 soldiers from the Light Dragoons and 2 Royal Anglian were deployed to the area. Johnson was heckled by local residents. On 11 November Corbyn said, "Under the Tories, front-line flood response and Environment Agency staff have been slashed by a fifth, and our fire-and-rescue service by nearly a quarter." The BBC scrutinized these figures and found they were supported by statistics from the Department for Environment, Food and Rural Affairs and the Home Office.

On 11 November the Ministry of Housing, Communities and Local Government initiated the Bellwin scheme, designed to provide compensation to local authorities for some of the initial costs they incur as a result of flooding in Yorkshire, Derbyshire and Nottinghamshire.

On 14 November the Environment Agency estimated that 830 properties had been flooded. This figure was challenged by The Guardian, which had contacted local authorities in Yorkshire, Derbyshire, Nottinghamshire and Lincolnshire, and found that at least 1,758 properties had been flooded.

On 15 November the Prime Minister announced households and business owners significantly affected by recent floods would receive relief on their council tax and business rates for at least the next three months. Chris Read, leader of Rotherham Council was critical of the lack of consultation with local authorities. A reporter from the Rotherham Advertiser sought clarity from the Government on how the relief would work, including eligibility criteria. A spokeswoman for the government admitted the criteria are "yet to be decided".

On 21 February 2020 Prince Charles visited Pontypridd and met with local residents. Rock band the Manic Street Preachers donated £3,000 towards those dealing with the flood damage, and a fundraising page, set up by local MP Alex Davies-Jones, raised more than £20,000.

In April 2020 Amanda Blanc, a former chair the Association of British Insurers, was appointed to review flood insurance for those affected in Doncaster following the November 2019 floods. The report was published in November 2020.

On 12 June 2020 Dan Jarvis, Mayor of Sheffield City Region Combined Authority, wrote to Boris Johnson and government ministers asking for action on improving flood defences in "close collaboration with devolved authorities." The government had made promises for action seven months earlier. The government responded by saying it was working to "identify suitable arrangements" for a "Yorkshire floods roundtable". Many residents and businesses in the Fishlake area were still not able to return home or were in need of repair work.

On 28 January 2022 a flood protection plan for South Yorkshire was launched. The £400m Connected by Water Action Plan, which received £110m of government funding, involves 100 projects. Dan Jarvis MP and South Yorkshire mayor said he believed the plan could "break the cycle". The plan includes the construction walls and barriers and also uses a range of natural methods to slow river flow, such as tree planting and land management to create more space for water. Floods Minister Rebecca Pow said, "This plan is a crucial step forward in improving the climate resilience of communities across South Yorkshire, which I hope will avoid a repeat of the devastating impact the November 2019 flooding had on people and businesses across the region."

== See also ==
- 2007 United Kingdom floods
- Storm Ciara (2020)
- Storm Dennis (2020)
- 2023 United Kingdom floods
