= Ferniehill =

Suburb of Edinburgh, Scotland

Coordinates: 55.9091°N 3.1296°W

Ferniehill is a residential neighbourhood of Edinburgh, the capital of Scotland. Primarily a low-density (bungalows and terraced houses) 1960s council estate with two small public parks, it is situated in the south-east of the city, lying immediately south of the slightly older Fernieside neighbourhood, east of Moredun, and to the north of Gilmerton's main street, where most local amenities are located. The Drum country estate and some farmland separates it from the village of Danderhall outside the city boundary.

In 2001, 35 houses in the area had to be demolished after subsiding due to the presence of limestone mine workings underground which had not been fully infilled or were supported by weak pillars. Despite this issue (which also affected other streets in that part of Edinburgh), in the early 21st century several developments of new housing on the greenbelt land in the vicinity of Ferniehill were approved, leading to concerns from residents over the mine workings, as well as insufficient transport infrastructure.
