= Grinton =

Village and civil parish in North Yorkshire, England

Coordinates: 54°22′52″N 1°55′47″W

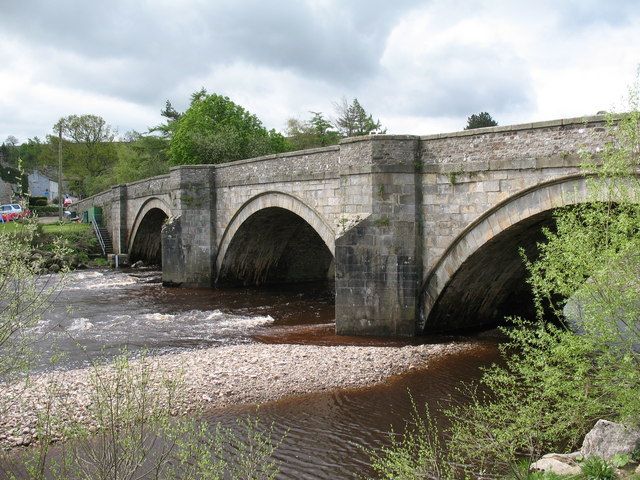
- Grinton Bridge across the River Swale

- Location within North Yorkshire
- Population: 200 (2011 census)
- OS grid reference: SE046983
- Unitary authority: North Yorkshire
- Ceremonial county: North Yorkshire
- Region: Yorkshire and the Humber
- Country: England
- Sovereign state: United Kingdom
- Post town: RICHMOND
- Postcode district: DL11
- Police: North Yorkshire
- Fire: North Yorkshire
- Ambulance: Yorkshire
- UK Parliament: Richmond and Northallerton

Grinton is a small village and civil parish in the Yorkshire Dales, North Yorkshire, England. Close to Reeth and Fremington, it lies 9 miles (15 km) west of Richmond on the B6270 road.

On 5 July 2014, the Tour de France Stage 1 from Leeds to Harrogate passed through the village. The route would have been repeated, if not for the changing of the route due to high rainfall, in the Men's road race in the 2019 UCI World Championships going through the climb Grinton moor, which lasted for 3 kilometres (1.9 mi) at an average gradient of 7%.

== History ==
The name Grinton derives from the Old English grēnetūn meaning 'green settlement'.

The manor of Grinton existed prior to the Norman conquest of 1066. Under William the Conqueror, it passed to Alan Rufus, and then to the family of Walter de Cantilupe. The manor came under the ownership of Bridlington Priory until the dissolution of the monasteries, when it came into the hands of the Swale family.

Humphrey Wharton operated lead mining in the area in the 17th century. There was a deer park west of the village, commemorated in the name Deer Park Cottages, which was owned by the Wharton family.

From 1974 to 2023 it was part of the district of Richmondshire. It is now administered by the unitary North Yorkshire Council.

== St Andrew's church ==
Often called "The Cathedral of the Dales", Grinton church is dedicated to St Andrew and was for centuries the main church for the whole of upper Swaledale, with many burials coming from miles away. The bodies were carried as much as 16 miles down the valley along the footpath from Keld, now known as the Corpse Way or corpse road, in wicker coffins. Several long stones, located at intervals along the path, traditionally called "coffin stones", are said to be where the coffin would have been set down while the pallbearers rested.

Fragments of the old Norman church remain, including the font and the tower arch, which dates from the late 12th century. Other parts of the building date from the late 13th or early 14th century, and the pulpit is Jacobean, but St Andrew's is now mainly a 15th-century rebuild.

The church is often used as a venue for concerts during the Swaledale Festival and at other times. It was featured in the British television series All Creatures Great and Small, in the episode "Brotherly Love".

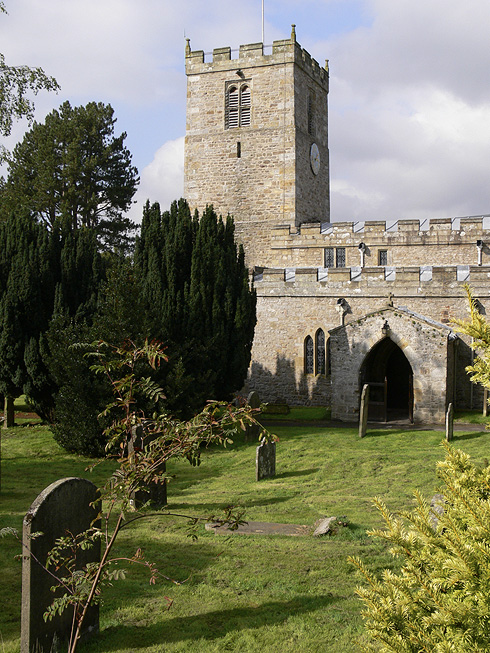
St Andrew's church, Grinton, from the south

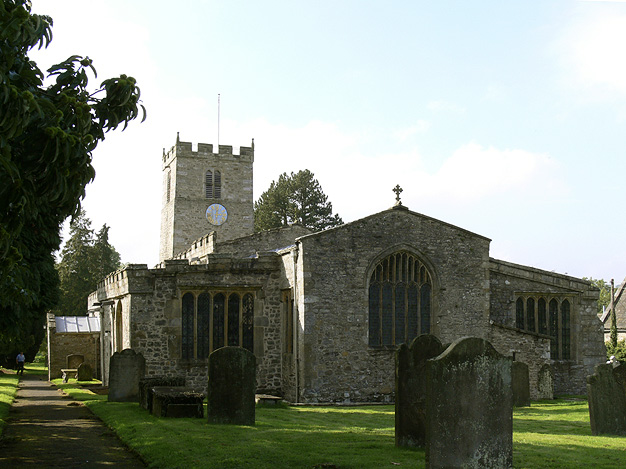
The east end of Grinton church features three windows in the Perpendicular style

== Other notable features ==
Grinton Bridge across the River Swale was widened in the 18th century. The river is reputedly the fastest-flowing in England, and Grinton is the first point above Richmond where it could normally be forded.

Blackburn Hall, between the churchyard and the river, dates from 1635.

The Bridge Inn is popular with walkers and is a venue for weekly folk music sessions, normally held on Thursday evenings.

Above the village, on the Leyburn road is YHA Grinton Lodge, a former shooting lodge which is now a youth hostel. Further on from the youth hostel, just off the road, is the site of Grinton Smelt Mill, a lead processing site built in the 19th century.

== See also ==
- Listed buildings in Grinton
