= Swaledale (disambiguation) =

Swaledale is one of the Yorkshire Dales in the United Kingdom. The name may also refer to:

- Swaledale (sheep), a breed of sheep named for the Yorkshire dale
- Swaledale Festival, within the Yorkshire Dales
- Swaledale, Iowa, a small town in the United States
- Swaledale (cheese), cheese made within the Yorkshire dale
