= List of museums in North Yorkshire =

This list of museums in North Yorkshire, England contains museums which are defined for this context as institutions (including nonprofit organizations, government entities, and private businesses) that collect and care for objects of cultural, artistic, scientific, or historical interest and make their collections or related exhibits available for public viewing. Also included are non-profit art galleries and university art galleries. Museums that exist only in cyberspace (i.e., virtual museums) are not included.

Name	Image	Town/City	Region	Type	Summary
Aldborough Roman Site		Aldborough	North Yorkshire	Archaeology	Operated by English Heritage, excavated Roman fort and artifacts
Bar Convent		York	York	Religious	17th century Roman Catholic convent that was established and operated in secret, museum of its history
Barley Hall		York	York	Historic house	Excavated and reconstructed medieval house
Beck Isle Museum		Pickering	North Yorkshire	History	Period shops displays, Victorian-era pub and parlour, historic costume gallery
Bedale Museum		Bedale	North Yorkshire	Local	local history, household and agriculture tools and items, located in Bedale Hall
Beningbrough Hall		Beningbrough	North Yorkshire	Historic house	Operated by the National Trust, late Georgian mansion with baroque interior, walled garden, home to over 100 portraits on loan from the National Portrait Gallery
Bolton Castle		Castle Bolton	North Yorkshire	Historic house	Medieval fortress where Mary, Queen of Scots was imprisoned in 1569 after her defeat at the Battle of Langside
Staithes Museum		Staithes	North Yorkshire	Biographical	History related to Captain James Cook, local history, fishing and mining
Captain Cook Birthplace Museum		Marton	Middlesbrough	Biographical	History and memorabilia of explorer Captain James Cook
Captain Cook Memorial Museum		Whitby	North Yorkshire	Historic house	17th-century house where the young James Cook lodged as apprentice, period rooms, exhibits on Cook, his voyages and their impact
Captain Cook Schoolroom Museum		Great Ayton	North Yorkshire	Education	reconstructed early 18th century schoolroom, exhibits about James Cook's early life and education, and his later achievements
Castle Howard		Castle Howard	York	Historic house	Early 18th century stately home with 1,000 acres (4.0 km^{2}) of gardens and landscapes, collections of paintings, antiquities, bronzes, furniture and tapestries
City Walls Experience at Micklegate Bar		York	York	History	located in the Micklegate Bar, history of York city walls
Cleveland Ironstone Mining Museum		Skinningrove	Redcar and Cleveland	Mining	also known as the Tom Leonard Mining Museum, ironstone mining, mine tours, skills, customs and life of the miners
Courthouse Museum		Ripon	North Yorkshire	Law enforcement	19th century period courthouse, part of the "Yorkshire Law and Order Museums"
Craven Museum & Gallery		Skipton	North Yorkshire	Multiple	local social history, archaeology, geology, art
Dales Countryside Museum		Hawes	North Yorkshire	Local	Local history of the Yorkshire Dales, including school days, home life, leisure time, religion, transport, communication and tourism, farming, local crafts and industries
DIG: an archaeological adventure		York	York	Archaeology	Discovery centre about the science of archaeology and area excavations
Dorman Museum		Linthorpe	Middlesbrough	Local	Industrial designer Christopher Dresser, local Linthorpe Pottery, natural history, local history, pottery and decorative arts, Ancient Egyptian and Roman artefacts.
Eden Camp Modern History Theme Museum		Malton	North Yorkshire	Military	Former prisoner of war camp in World War II, themed barracks displays about the war
Fairfax House		York	York	Historic house	Georgian townhouse with restored 18th century interior
Filey Museum		Filey	North Yorkshire	Local	local history, culture, fishing, farming, period craft and room displays
Fountains Abbey and Studley Royal		Aldfield	North Yorkshire	Multiple	Operated by the National Trust, include the ruins of the 12th century Cistercian monastery, Fountain Hall, Studley Royal Park, 12th-century Cistercian cornmill, water garden
Gayle Mill		Gayle	North Yorkshire	Technology	Restored 18th-century cotton mill and now sawmill
Goddards House and Garden		York	York	Historic house	Operated by the National Trust, former home of the Terry's family with exhibits about the family and their chocolate business
Grassington Folk Museum		Skipton	North Yorkshire	History	local history, lead mining, minerals, tools, farming, period costumes, Yorkshire Dales Railway, household items
Green Howards Regimental Museum		Richmond	North Yorkshire	Military	History and memorabilia of the Green Howards (Alexandra, Princess of Wales's Own Yorkshire Regiment)
Guisborough Museum		Guisborough	Redcar and Cleveland	Local	information, local social, agricultural and commercial history
Holgate Windmill		Holgate	York	Mill	Late 18th-century tower windmill under restoration
Hovingham Hall		Hovingham	North Yorkshire	Historic house	18th century Palladian-style country house, childhood home of Katharine, Duchess of Kent
Jorvik Viking Centre		York	York	Archaeology	Preserved remains of the Viking city of Jórvík, reconstructed 10th century settlement with living history enactors
Kiplin Hall		Scorton	North Yorkshire	Historic house	17th century Jacobean house, exhibit on George Calvert, 1st Baron Baltimore and family
Kirkleatham Museum		Kirkleatham	Redcar and Cleveland	Multiple	local history, art including works by the Staithes group, toys, mining, culture
Knaresborough Castle		Knaresborough	North Yorkshire	History	Ruins of medieval fortress, Courthouse Museum of local history, royal residents, medieval life exhibit, Tudor courtroom
Kohima Museum		Fulford	York	Military	located within Imphal Barracks and dedicated to the 1944 Battle of Kohima in India and the British and Indian soldiers who fought there
Malton Museum		Malton	North Yorkshire	Archaeology	local Roman-era artifacts, reconstructed village home and artifacts from Wharram Percy, a deserted medieval village
Mansion House		York	York	Historic house	Early Georgian townhouse, official home of the Lord Mayor of York
Markenfield Hall		Ripon	North Yorkshire	Historic house	14th century medieval country house
Mercer Art Gallery		Harrogate	North Yorkshire	Art	municipal art gallery for Harrogate district's fine art collection which consists of some 2000 works of art, mainly from the 19th and 20th centuries
Merchant Adventurers' Hall		York	York	History	Medieval guild hall, almshouse and chapel with art, furniture and furnishings from different periods
Middlesbrough Institute of Modern Art		Middlesbrough	Middlesbrough	Art	Contemporary art gallery
Moulton Hall		Moulton	North Yorkshire	Historic house	Operated by the National Trust, 17th-century manor house, open by advance arrangement
Museum of Victorian Science		Glaisdale	North Yorkshire	Science	early scientific equipment and electrical instruments, open by appointment
National Railway Museum		York	York	Railway	History of rail transport in Britain and its impact on society, locomotives, rolling stock, equipment, artifacts and memorabilia
Newby Hall		Ripon	North Yorkshire	Historic house	Late 17th-century house with interior by Robert Adam, gardens
Newham Grange Leisure Farm		Coulby Newham	Middlesbrough	Agriculture	Farm park and rare breed conservation centre, reconstructions of a 19th-century veterinary surgery and an early 20th-century agricultural merchants shop, history of farming since the 17th century
Nidderdale Museum		Pateley Bridge	North Yorkshire	History	Rural life, period rooms and trades, costumes, agriculture tools and equipment, local industries and transport vehicles
North Yorkshire Moors Railway		Pickering	North Yorkshire	Railroad	Heritage railroad, exhibits in the Pickering railway station
North Yorkshire Motor Museum		Thornton-le-Dale	North Yorkshire	Transportation	commercial vehicles, automobiles, motorbikes, memorabilia, operated by Mathewson's North Yorkshire
Nunnington Hall		Nunnington	North Yorkshire	Historic house	Operated by the National Trust, country house with 17th and 18th century period rooms, art and photography exhibits
Ormesby Hall		Ormesby	Redcar and Cleveland	Historic house	Operated by the National Trust, 18th-century mansion house with Victorian kitchen and laundry, gardens, weekend living history enactors
Prince of Wales's Own Regiment of Yorkshire Museum		York	York	Military	History and artifacts of the Prince of Wales's Own Regiment of Yorkshire; located in the same building as the Royal Dragoon Guards Museum
Prison & Police Museum		Ripon	North Yorkshire	Prison	19th century prison and later police station, includes prison cells, pillory, stocks, whipping post, police box, history of policing, uniforms, insignia, part of the "Yorkshire Law and Order Museums"
Queen's Own Yorkshire Yeomanry Museum		York	York	Military	information, history and artifacts of the Queen's Own Yorkshire Yeomanry, open by appointment
Quilt Museum and Gallery		York	York	Art	History of British quilt making and textile arts. Closed in 2015
Richard III Experience at Monk Bar		York	York	Prison	Located in the Monk Bar, historic prison with exhibits of Richard III, last king of the Plantagenet dynasty
Richmondshire Museum		Richmond	North Yorkshire	Local	Local history, transportation, lead mining, period chemist's shop, grocer's shop and post office, set from the All Creatures Great and Small TV series
Robin Hood's Bay and Fylingdales Museum		Robin Hood's Bay	North Yorkshire	Local	local history, smuggling, fishing, shipping
Royal Dragoon Guards Museum		York	York	Military	History and artifacts of the regiment
Royal Pump Room Museum		Harrogate	North Yorkshire	Local	Local history, culture, artifacts from Ancient Egypt, sulphur well, spa town heritage, Victorian home life
Rotunda Museum		Scarborough	North Yorkshire	Natural history	Jurassic fossils and minerals, geology
Ryedale Folk Museum		Hutton-le-Hole	North Yorkshire	Open air	historic buildings from different eras, trades and types, art gallery
Scampston Hall		Scampston	North Yorkshire	Historic house	1690 country house, remodeled in the late 1700s, decorated in 1860 and 1910, collection of paintings, porcelain and furniture, known for contemporary walled garden
Scarborough Art Gallery		Scarborough	North Yorkshire	Art	
Scarborough Fair Collection		Lebberston	North Yorkshire	Amusement	Mechanical organs, steam engines, fairground rides, vintage cars, miniature vehicles and model railways
Shandy Hall		Coxwold	North Yorkshire	Historic house	Home of the Rev. Laurence Sterne, who is famous for his novel The Life and Opinions of Tristram Shandy, Gentleman
Skipton Castle		Skipton	North Yorkshire	Historic house	Medieval fortress castle with six drum towers
Sutton Park		Sutton-on-the-Forest	North Yorkshire	Historic house	18th century Georgian country house
Swaledale Museum		Reeth	North Yorkshire	Local	Local history, geology, lead mining, trades, farming, culture
Thirsk Museum		Thirsk	North Yorkshire	Local	local history, culture, 19th century period cottage kitchen, Victorian bedroom, early 20th century period sitting room, period shop displays, archaeology, cricketing memorabilia
Tockett's Mill		Guisborough	Redcar and Cleveland	Mill	restored water-driven corn mill and restaurant
Treasurer's House		York	York	Historic house	Operated by the National Trust, reflects different periods from the Roman to Edwardian eras, collection of antique furniture, ceramics, textiles and paintings from a 300-year period
Whitby Abbey		Whitby	North Yorkshire	Religious	Operated by English Heritage, remains and artifacts of the Benedictine abbey, visitor centre in Cholmley House
Whitby Lifeboat Museum		Whitby	North Yorkshire	Maritime	lifesaving history and artifacts, a lifeboat, models, paintings, medals, photographs, lifeboat kit, items from famous rescues, famous coxswains Henry Freeman and Tom Langlands
Whitby Museum		Whitby	North Yorkshire	Multiple	Local history, social history, Pannett Art Gallery, costumes, Whitby jet, Captain James Cook and HM Bark Endeavour, whaling industry, natural history, jewellery,
Winkies Castle Folk Museum		Marske-by-the-Sea	Redcar and Cleveland	Local	Local history, culture
Workhouse Museum		Ripon	North Yorkshire	History	19th century workhouse, part of the "Yorkshire Law and Order Museums"
World of James Herriot		Thirsk	North Yorkshire	Biographical	Life and works of veterinarian and author James Herriot, 1940s period house with veterinary science exhibits
York Art Gallery		York	York	Art	Collection includes paintings from 14th century to contemporary, and 20th century ceramics
York Castle Museum		York	York	History	Recreated Victorian street with shops, period rooms including a Victorian parlour and Jacobean dining room, displays of everyday life, 1960s memorabilia, wartime experience in World War II, York Castle Prison
York Cold War Bunker		Holgate	York	Military	Secret Cold War bunker to monitor nuclear explosions and fallout in the event of nuclear war
York Minster		York	York	Religious	Cathedral, tower, stained glass window conservation centre, exhibits of art and history of the cathedral
York St. Mary's		York	York	Art	Contemporary visual art space in a deconsecrated medieval church, operated by York Museums Trust
Yorkshire Air Museum		Elvington	York	Aviation	Historic aircraft, history of RAF Elvington, military vehicles, exhibits on air gunners, RAF Bomber Command
Yorkshire Museum		York	York	Multiple	Natural history, geology, archaeology and astronomy
Yorkshire Museum of Farming		Murton	York	Agriculture	Agriculture equipment, rural life, changes in farming, small section of the Derwent Valley Light Railway, live animals
Zetland Lifeboat Museum and Redcar Heritage Centre		Redcar	Redcar and Cleveland	Maritime	houses the Zetland lifeboat, exhibits about lifesaving rescues, replica fisherman's cottage, area maritime heritage

== Defunct museums ==
- Duncombe Park, Helmsley, house closed to the public in 2011, gardens open

== See also ==
- Category:Tourist attractions in North Yorkshire
