= Skelton, west North Yorkshire =

Hamlet in North Yorkshire, England

Coordinates: 54.40328°N 1.85467°W

Skelton
- Location within North Yorkshire
- OS grid reference: NZ095008
- Civil parish: Marske
- Unitary authority: North Yorkshire
- Ceremonial county: North Yorkshire
- Region: Yorkshire and the Humber
- Country: England
- Sovereign state: United Kingdom
- Post town: Richmond
- Postcode district: DL11
- Police: North Yorkshire
- Fire: North Yorkshire
- Ambulance: Yorkshire
- UK Parliament: Richmond and Northallerton

Skelton is a small hamlet in the county of North Yorkshire, England. It is within the Yorkshire Dales National Park near the larger village of Marske in Swaledale. Along with the other Skelton's in Yorkshire, the name derives from Old English and means The farm on a shelf of land.

From 1974 to 2023 it was part of the district of Richmondshire, it is now administered by the unitary North Yorkshire Council.

During the 17th century, on the moors around Skelton were several lead mines.

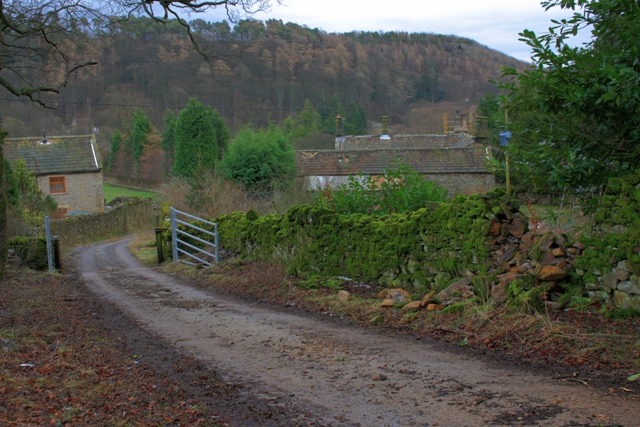
Approaching Skelton
