= Marsk =

Marsk could refer to:

- The Danish and Swedish form of Marshal, a military or civilian rank in many countries.
- Marske (horse), sometimes spelt 'Marsk', an 18th-century racehorse and sire of the famous Eclipse.
- Marske, Richmondshire, a village near Richmond in North Yorkshire
- Marske-by-the-Sea, a village in Redcar and Cleveland in north-east England.
