= New Forest (disambiguation) =

The New Forest is an area of forest and heathland in England. New Forest may also refer to:

- New Forest coven, an alleged group of witches
- New Forest District, a local government district in Hampshire, England
- New Forest (UK Parliament constituency), a constituency from 1885 to 1918 and again from 1950 to 1997
- New Forest, North Yorkshire, a civil parish in England
- New Forest pony, a pony breed of the British Isles
- The Children of the New Forest, a novel by Captain Marryat
