= Marske Hall, Richmondshire =

Country house in North Yorkshire, England

Coordinates: 54°14′20″N 0°37′56″W

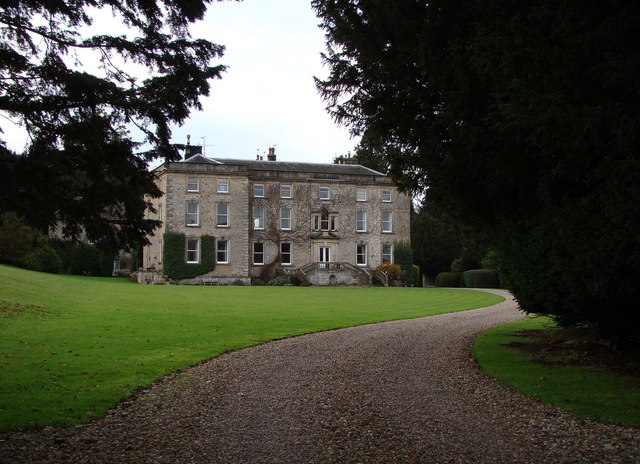
Marske Hall

Marske Hall is a Grade II* listed country house in Marske, North Yorkshire, England.

== History ==
Markse Hall was bought in 1596 by the then Archbishop of York, Matthew Hutton. Initial work on the hall was started by Matthew's son, Timothy, and after a remodelling in the 1730s, a stable block was added in 1750 by John Hutton II, the son of the former member of parliament for Richmond bearing the same name, whose racehorse Marske was best known for siring the undefeated Eclipse. The ornamental gardens were added in 1836. The grounds, as well as the stables, remain separated from the hall by a road providing access to the village.

During the Second World War, the hall was used to house pupils from Scarborough College. In the 1960s, the estate was sold to local builder, George Shaw, and converted into 10 apartments; however, the mansion was put on the market in 2012 for the sum of £2.5 million. In 2020, proposals were made to convert the grade II listed building into 20 holiday lets.

== Architecture ==
The house is built of stone with stone slate roofs, and has an irregular plan, the main house with an L-shaped plan, three storeys and a basement, and seven bays, the left two bays projecting, and a two-storey rear wing. The main front has a plinth, quoins, a modillion cornice, and a parapet with panels and half-balusters. A staircase with balusters leads up to the doorcase that has engaged Ionic columns, an entablature and a broken pediment, and a doorway with an architrave and a keystone. Above it is an Ionic Venetian window, and the other windows are sashes, those on the lower two floors with keystones. At the rear is a Tuscan Venetian window.

== See also ==
- Grade II* listed buildings in North Yorkshire (district)
- Listed buildings in Marske, west North Yorkshire
