= Marske, west North Yorkshire =

Village and civil parish in North Yorkshire, England

Coordinates: 54°23′57″N 1°50′30″W

Marske
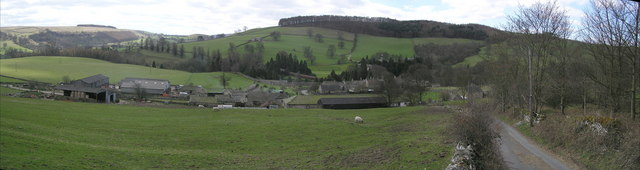
- Marske Village : Looking South from Cordilleras Lane

- Location within North Yorkshire
- Population: 127 (Including New Forest. 2011 census)
- OS grid reference: NZ103004
- Unitary authority: North Yorkshire
- Ceremonial county: North Yorkshire
- Region: Yorkshire and the Humber
- Country: England
- Sovereign state: United Kingdom
- Post town: Richmond
- Postcode district: DL11
- Police: North Yorkshire
- Fire: North Yorkshire
- Ambulance: Yorkshire
- UK Parliament: Richmond and Northallerton

Marske is a village and civil parish in the county of North Yorkshire, England in lower Swaledale on the boundary of the Yorkshire Dales National Park, 5 miles (8 km) west of Richmond. At the 2011 Census, the population of the parish, including New Forest, was 127. It includes the hamlets of Applegarth, Clints, Feldom and Skelton.

== History ==
The name Marske derives from the Old English mersc meaning 'marsh'.

St Edmund's Church, Marske dates back to the 12th century.

In 1870-72 John Marius Wilson's Imperial Gazetteer of England and Wales described Marske as:

"A village and a parish in Richmond district, N. R. Yorkshire. The village stands on the rivulet Marske, a little above its inflnx to the Swale, 5½ miles W of Richmond r. station; and has a post office under Richmond, Yorkshire. The parish contains also the hamlets of Feldon and Skelton, and comprises 6,557 acres."

=== Marske Hall ===
Marske was long associated with the Hutton family, landowners and High Sheriffs of Yorkshire. Matthew Hutton, the archbishop of Canterbury, was born in Marske. Marske Hall, on the outskirts of the village, was bought in 1596 by the then Archbishop of York, Matthew Hutton. Initial work on the hall was started by Matthew's son, Timothy, and after a remodelling in the 1730s, a stable block was added in 1750 by John Hutton II, the son of the former member of parliament for Richmond bearing the same name, whose racehorse Marske was best known for siring the undefeated Eclipse. The ornamental gardens were added in 1836, and the grounds, as well as the stables remain separated from the hall by a road providing access to the village.

During the Second World War, the hall was used to house pupils from Scarborough College. In the 1960s the estate was sold to local builder George Shaw and converted into ten apartments, however the mansion was put on the market in 2012 for the sum of £2.5 million. In 2020, proposals were made to convert the grade II listed building into 20 holiday lets.

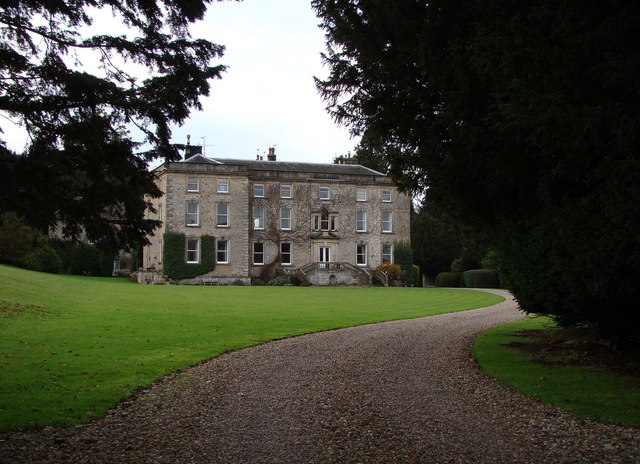
Marske Hall

== Governance ==
The civil parish now shares a grouped parish council with the civil parish of New Forest, known as Marske & New Forest Parish Council. The village lies within the Richmond and Northallerton parliamentary constituency, which is under the control of the Conservative Party. The current Member of Parliament, since the 2015 general election, is Rishi Sunak. From 1974 to 2023 it was part of the district of Richmondshire, it is now administered by the unitary North Yorkshire Council.

== See also ==
- Listed buildings in Marske, west North Yorkshire
