= Listed buildings in New Forest, North Yorkshire =

New Forest is a civil parish in the county of North Yorkshire, England. It contains three listed buildings that are recorded in the National Heritage List for England. All the listed buildings are designated at Grade II, the lowest of the three grades, which is applied to "buildings of national importance and special interest". The parish consists of countryside and moorland, and it does not contain any significant settlements. The listed buildings consist of a farmhouse and farm buildings.

== Buildings ==
| Name and location | Photograph | Date | Notes |
|---|---|---|---|
| Farm building east of Holgate Farmhouse; 54.43022°N 1.89694°W | | 1632 | A farmhouse, later used for other purposes, in sandstone with quoins, and a stone slate roof with shaped kneelers and stone coping. There are two storeys and three bays. The main doorway has a chamfered quoined surround, and a dated and initialled lintel with a triangular soffit, and on the front are other doorways and windows. |
| Usher House; 54.43025°N 1.89658°W | — | Early to mid 18th century | A house, later used for other purposes, in stone on a plinth, with quoins, and a pantile roof with stone slates at the eaves, a shaped kneeler and stone coping on the left. There are two storeys and three bays. The doorway has a stone surround with bases, and most of the windows are sashes. |
| Holgate Farmhouse and farm building 54.43026°N 1.89737°W | | 1741 | The farmhouse is in sandstone, with quoins, and a stone slate roof with a shaped kneeler and stone coping on the right. There are two storeys and a T-shaped plan, with a front range of three bays. The doorway has a quoined surround, a fanlight, and an initialled and dated lintel. The windows are a mix of sashes and casements, and at the rear is a square stair turret. The farm building to the right is in stone, with a corrugated sheet roof, two bays, quoins, a segmental-arched cart opening, doorways, a window, and external steps leading to an upper floor doorway. |
