= St Edmund's Church, Marske =

Church in Marske, near Richmond, North Yorkshire, England

Coordinates: 54°23′59″N 1°50′26″W

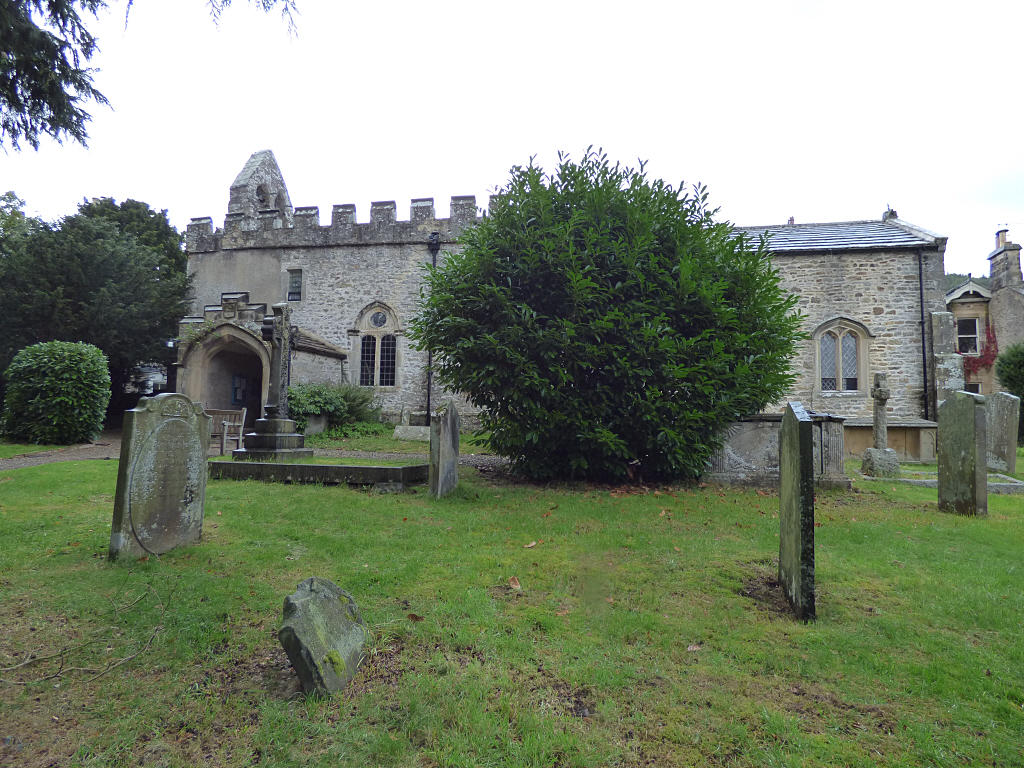
The church, in 2017

St Edmund's Church is the parish church of Marske, a village near Richmond, North Yorkshire in England.

The church was built in the 12th century, from which period part of the nave survives. It was largely rebuilt in 1683, and Nikolaus Pevsner describes this as the most interesting work, "especially two south windows with the oddest interpretation of Early English tracery and even with some dogtooth. The church was restored in 1830, when most of the fittings were replaced. A porch was added later in the century. The church was grade II* listed in 1969.

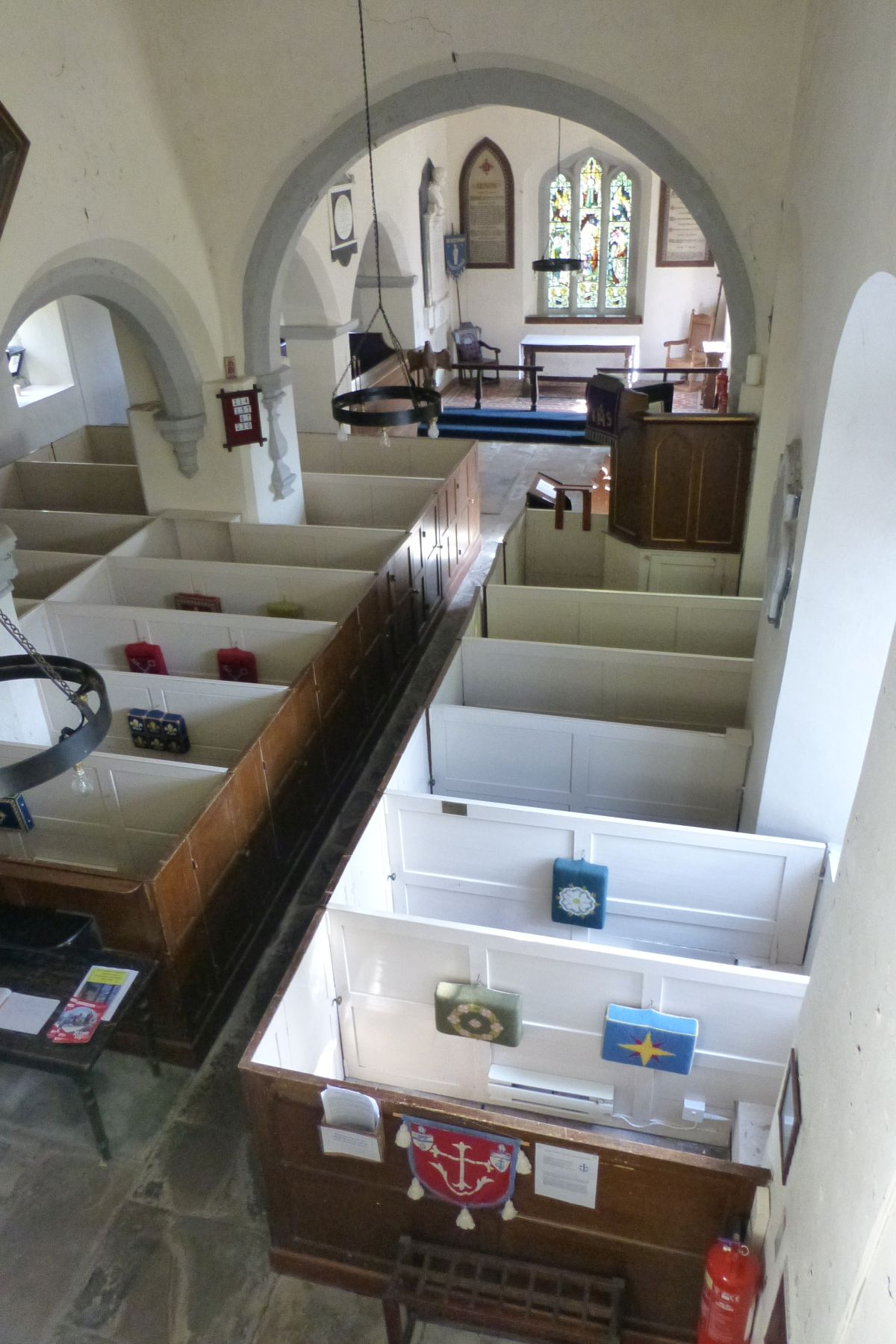
View from the gallery

The church is built of stone, partly rendered and has a stone slate roof. The church consists of a nave, a north aisle, a south porch, and a chancel with a north aisle. On the west gable is a bellcote with two chamfered pointed arches. The porch has a Tudor arch with a chamfered surround, above which is a coat of arms, and a stepped embattled parapet, The inner doorway is Norman, and has a round arch with two orders. The nave also has an embattled parapet. Inside, there is an octagonal font inscribed "T H 1633", an altar table and rail from about 1700. In the porch are some pieces of stone with blackletter text inscriptions.

== See also ==
- Grade II* listed churches in North Yorkshire (district)
- Listed buildings in Marske, west North Yorkshire
