= Richmondshire Museum =

Museum in North Yorkshire, England

Coordinates: 54.40412°N 1.736040°W

The Richmondshire Museum is a museum located in Richmond in North Yorkshire, England.

The Museum Trust was founded in 1974 by the Soroptimists of Richmond and the Dales; the Museum opened in 1978 in a former joiner's workshop, and has expanded its collections ever since.

The Museum incorporates a reconstructed cruck house, which contains a collection of domestic bygones. There is a Leadmining Gallery, which details the industry which flourished in Swaledale and the North Yorkshire Dales until the end of the nineteenth century. The Transport Gallery has a model of Richmond Railway Station. Another room contains the Herriot Set from the BBC's All Creatures Great and Small, and Barker's Chemist's Shop. The Wenham Gallery covers the history of Richmond and district. In 2008 the Museum opened a recreation of the Richmond grocer's shop where the founder of the Fenwick department store chain began his working life. Next to this there is a recreation of an ironmonger's shop and the Museum also houses the old post office from nearby Grinton.

The Museum also boasts a purpose built Discovery Centre that can be used by both schools and visiting families. Here visitors can dress up and play in the mock up shop and with bygone toys; this room also houses the Museums Wednesday Workshops which are free activity sessions for families.
