= Swaledale Museum =

Museum in North Yorkshire, England

Coordinates: 54.3888°N 1.9410°W

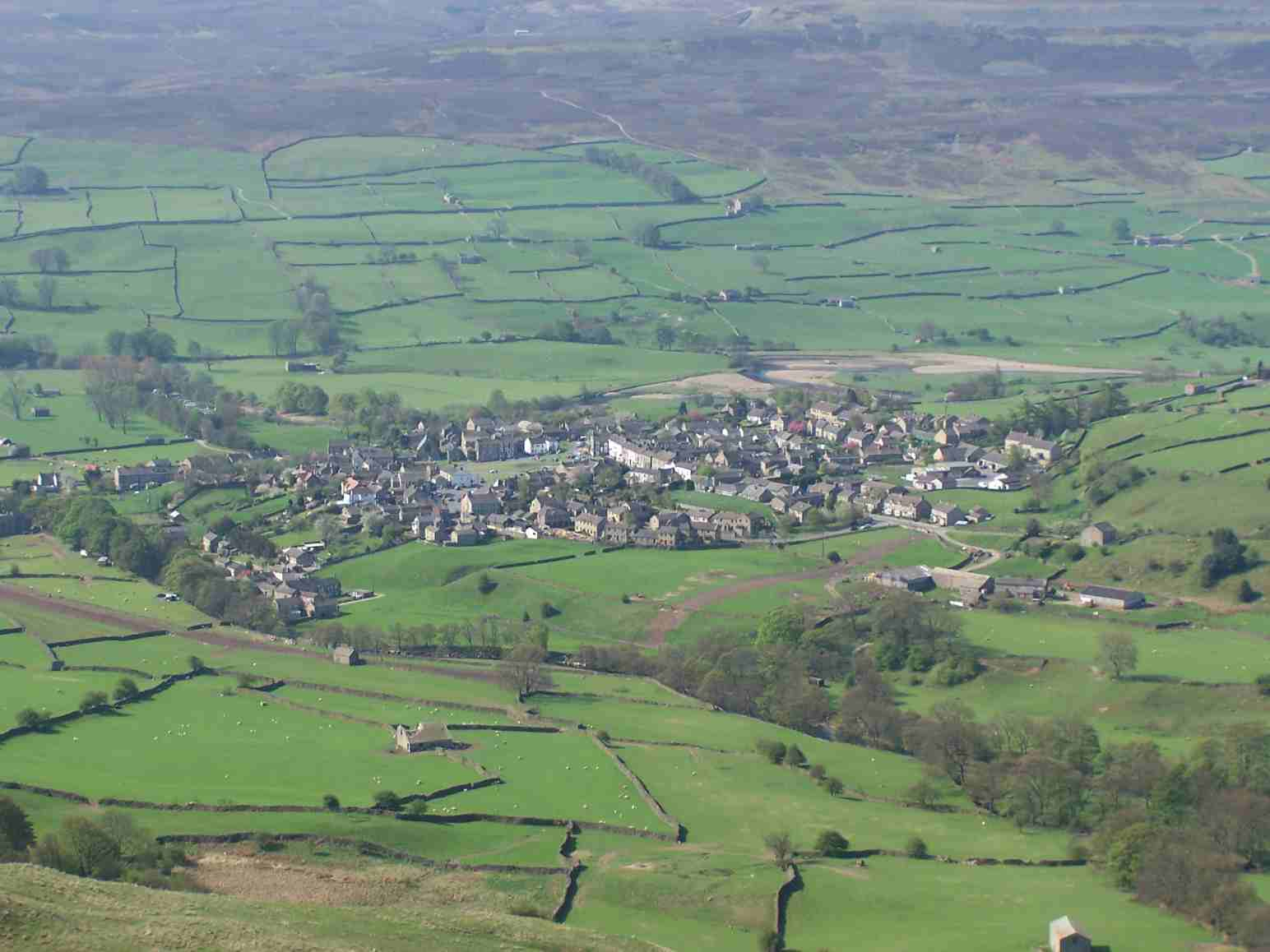
A view from Fremington Edge of the village of Reeth, where Swaledale Museum is located, and the surrounding area of Swaledale covered by the museum.

Swaledale Museum is a local museum in the village of Reeth, near Richmond in North Yorkshire, England. It covers rural history including life and work in the local area of Swaledale and Arkengarthdale within the Yorkshire Dales National Park.

== History ==
The museum is in the former Methodist school room near The Green in Reeth. The school was built in 1836 on the site of two cottages that dated from the late 17th or early 18th century. After the Quaker school was built in Reeth in 1862, the building became a Sunday School. During the Second World War, the building was used to billet troops who attended the Battle Training Camp at Catterick. After the Second World War, the building was used as a recreation hall.

In 1974, the building was bought from the Methodist Church and opened as a privately owned museum, the Swaledale Folk Museum. In 2004 there was a change of ownership, but the museum remains independently run with a team of volunteers.

== Friends of Swaledale Museum ==
There is a Friends of Swaledale Museum volunteer group, which helps in the running of the museum and its associated activities and groups.

== Exhibits ==
Among the exhibits at the museum are some photographs of the former lead mine at Arn Gill, and the original engraved keystone from its entrance arch.

== See also ==
- List of museums in North Yorkshire
- Swaledale Festival
