= Helwith =

Hamlet in North Yorkshire, England

Coordinates: 54.42216°N 1.88658°W

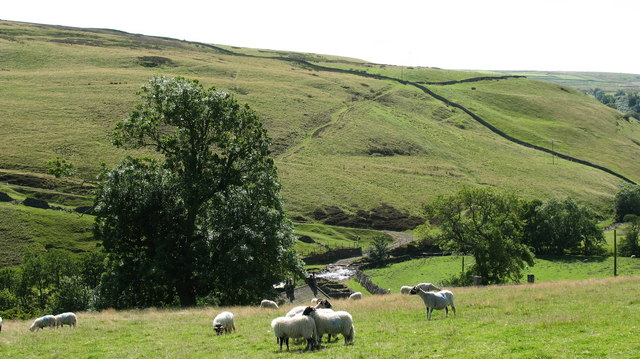
- Sheep graze above Helwith

- Location within North Yorkshire
- OS grid reference: NZ074029
- Civil parish: New Forest
- Unitary authority: North Yorkshire
- Ceremonial county: North Yorkshire
- Region: Yorkshire and the Humber
- Country: England
- Sovereign state: United Kingdom
- Police: North Yorkshire
- Fire: North Yorkshire
- Ambulance: Yorkshire

Helwith is a hamlet and farm in the civil parish of New Forest, in North Yorkshire, England about 6 miles north-west of Richmond. It lies in the valley of Marske Beck, a tributary of the River Swale, in an area historically important for lead mining. From 1974 to 2023 it was part of the district of Richmondshire, it is now administered by the unitary North Yorkshire Council.
