= Listed buildings in Marske, west North Yorkshire =

Marske is a civil parish in the county of North Yorkshire, England. It contains 19 listed buildings that are recorded in the National Heritage List for England. Of these, two are listed at Grade II*, the middle of the three grades, and the others are at Grade II, the lowest grade. The parish contains the village of Marske and the surrounding countryside. The listed buildings include a church and items in the churchyard, a chapel, a country house and associated structures, smaller houses, two bridges, a lime kiln, a memorial obelisk, a farmstead and a waterwheel.

== Key ==
Grade	Criteria
II*	Particularly important buildings of more than special interest
II	Buildings of national importance and special interest

== Buildings ==
Name and location	Photograph	Date	Notes	Grade
St Edmund's Church; 54.39986°N 1.84055°W		12th century	The church has been altered and extended through the centuries, in particular a restoration in 1683. It is built in stone, partly rendered and has a stone slate roof. The church consists of a nave, a north aisle, a south porch, and a chancel with a north aisle. On the west gable is a bellcote with two chamfered pointed arches. The porch has a Tudor arch with a chamfered surround, above which is a coat of arms, and a stepped embattled parapet, The inner doorway is Norman, and has a round arch with two orders. The nave also has an embattled parapet.	II*
Marske Bridge; 54.39932°N 1.84156°W		15th century	The bridge, which was widened in the 19th century, carries Hard Stiles over Marske Beck. It is in stone, and consists of a single segmental arch, the parapets with segmental coping. The arch on the downstream side is chamfered and has a hood mould, and the upstream side has chamfered rusticated voussoirs, and is flanked by pilaster buttresses. There is a stile at the northwest corner.	II
Cross base 54.39979°N 1.84059°W	—	16th century	The cross base is in the churchyard of St Edmund's Church, immediately to the west of the porch. It is in sandstone, and has a square plan and broached corners. On it has been placed a war memorial cross.	II
Marske Hall; 54.39842°N 1.84154°W		Late 16th to early 17th century	A country house that was remodelled and extended in 1683, and later converted into flats. It is in stone with stone slate roofs, and has an irregular plan, the main house with an L-shaped plan, three storeys and a basement, and seven bays, the left two bays projecting, and a two-storey rear wing. The main front has a plinth, quoins, a modillion cornice, and a parapet with panels and half-balusters. A staircase with balusters leads up to the doorcase that has engaged Ionic columns, an entablature and a broken pediment, and a doorway with an architrave and a keystone. Above it is an Ionic Venetian window, and the other windows are sashes, those on the lower two floors with keystones. At the rear is a Tuscan Venetian window.	II*
Pillimire Bridge; 54.40143°N 1.84754°W		Late 17th century (probable)	The bridge carries a footpath over Marske Beck. It is in stone, and consists of two segmental arches, the main arch with a longer span. The bridge has slab hood moulds, a pilaster buttress on the downstream side, and segmental coping. The parapets end in bollards at the northern end.	II
Stables and coach house, Marske Hall; 54.39792°N 1.84245°W	—	1741	The buildings are in stone with a stone slate roof, they have two storeys, and form four ranges around a courtyard. The entrance front has a plinth, quoins, a cornice band and a hipped roof. There are seven bays, the middle bay projecting slightly. In each bay is a round arched opening, that in the middle bay with a Gibbs surround, and the others with an architrave, a tripartite keystone, and an impost band. The upper floor contains sash windows in architraves and on the roof is chamfered and rusticated clock tower with a cornice, surmounted by a cupola with a lead roof and a weathervane. The side ranges have seven bays of recessed arcades.	II
The Old Rectory; 54.39990°N 1.84105°W	—	1753	The rectory, later a private house, is in sandstone, with quoins, an eaves band, and a stone slate roof with stone coping and a shaped kneeler on the left. There are two storeys, a main block of three bays, a taller two-bay extension to the right, and a recessed bay on the left. In the centre of the main block is a doorway with a chamfered surround and an architrave. In each part are sash windows, and in the right extension is a canted bay window.	II
Rookby Memorial; 54.39966°N 1.84046°W	—	c. 1771	The memorial is in the churchyard of St Edmund's Church, to the south of the church, and commemorates two brothers who were drowned. It consists of a sandstone headstone, rounded in the centre of the top, with incised edges and an inscription.	II
Coach house, Clints; 54.40309°N 1.84683°W	—	Late 18th century	The coach house, later used for other purposes, is in sandstone on a plinth, with quoins, and a stone slate roof, hipped on the right. It has a moulded cornice and coping forming a pediment. There are two storeys, three bays, and a slightly recessed bay to the right. Each bay contains a round arch with a keystone there is a continuous impost band, and the windows are sashes.	II
Garden wall and summerhouse, Clints; 54.40368°N 1.84847°W	—	Late 18th century (probable)	The garden wall and summerhouse are in red brick, the summerhouse with a stone slate roof and stone coping. The wall is coped, and forms a right angle, one arm extending for about 100 metres (330 ft), and the other arm containing an archway. The summerhouse is in the angle and has five sides. One side contains three round-arched openings with an impost band and keystones, the other sides containing sash windows.	II
Methodist Chapel; 54.40253°N 1.84666°W		Late 18th century	The chapel, later converted for residential use, is in stone with quoins, and a stone slate roof, hipped on the right. It is in one and two storeys, and has four bays, the southern end canted. It contains doorways, some blocked, and a mix of windows including sashes, casements and a mullioned window, the windows on the canted end with round-arched heads.	II
Lime kiln 54.41462°N 1.82028°W		Late 18th to early 19th century	The lime kiln is in stone, and has an irregular circular plan. On the front is a segmental-arched opening, and on the top is a large hole.	II
Cordilleras Farmstead; 54.42897°N 1.85384°W		1811–24	The farmstead, later used for other purposes, consists of a farmhouse and former farm buildings. These surround a foldyard behind the farmhouse, and there are two further foldyards to the northeast and north. The buildings are in stone with stone slate roofs. The farmhouse has two storeys and three bays. On the front is a porch with sandstone jambs, consoles, and a segmental pediment. The eastern range contains an entrance with an arched opening.	II
Hutton's Monument; 54.39312°N 1.84782°W		c. 1814	The monument is in sandstone, and consists of an obelisk in a railed enclosure. The obelisk has a square plan, and is set on a dado with corner buttresses and a cornice, on a square base with a torus cornice. On the south side is an inscribed panel. The enclosure has a low wall with chamfered coping, square gate piers with pyramidal caps, and wrought iron railings and gate.	II
Farm buildings northwest of Marske Hall; 54.39843°N 1.84356°W	—	Early 19th century	The farm buildings are in stone, with a stone slate roof, one storey and a U-shaped plan, and the openings have segmental heads. The main range contains two doorways and sash windows, the left wing has three arches, and the right wing has two.	II
Gothic Barn, Marske Hall; 54.39542°N 1.83968°W		Early 19th century (probable)	A cow byre and hay barn in stone, with quoins, stone slate roofs and two storeys. There is a T-shaped plan, with a main range of five bays, and a rear wing of three bays. In the centre of the main range is a barn opening with a pointed arch and a blind quatrefoil above, it is flanked by doorways with pointed arches, and there are slit vents above. The left gable is embattled, and the right gable is coped. The rear wing contains openings with pointed arches, and slit vents, and the gable is embattled.	II
Kennels, Marske Hall; 54.39843°N 1.84356°W	—	Early 19th century	The disused kennels are in stone, with a hipped stone slate roof. There is one storey, a slightly curved plan, and seven bays. The building contains three round-arched doorways with open ironwork fanlights and imposts, and sash windows with segmental heads.	II
Gateway, Marske Hall; 54.39778°N 1.84004°W		c. 1834	At the entrance to the drive are wrought iron carriage and pedestrian gates. The pedestrian gates are in round-arched sandstone openings, the pilasters with banded rustication, and with imposts and pediments.	II
Waterwheel west of Pillimire Bridge; 54.40143°N 1.84782°W		Late 19th century	The wooden waterwheel has a cast iron axle, and wooden buckets, sole plates and spokes. It is set in a stone-lined wheel race.	II
