= Applegarth, North Yorkshire =

Village in North Yorkshire, England

Coordinates: 54.409°N 1.803°W

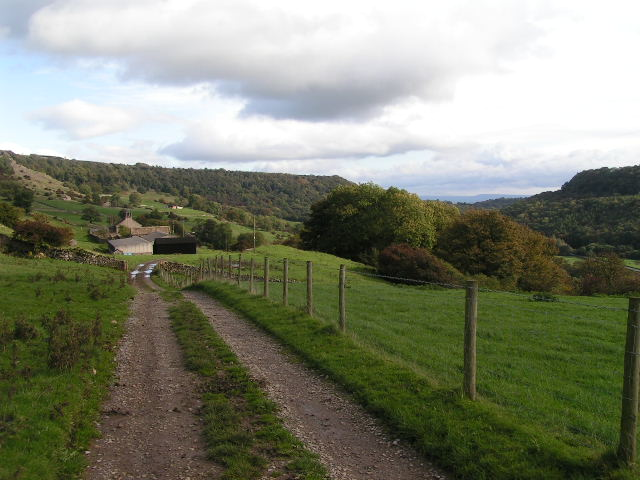
West Applegarth Farm

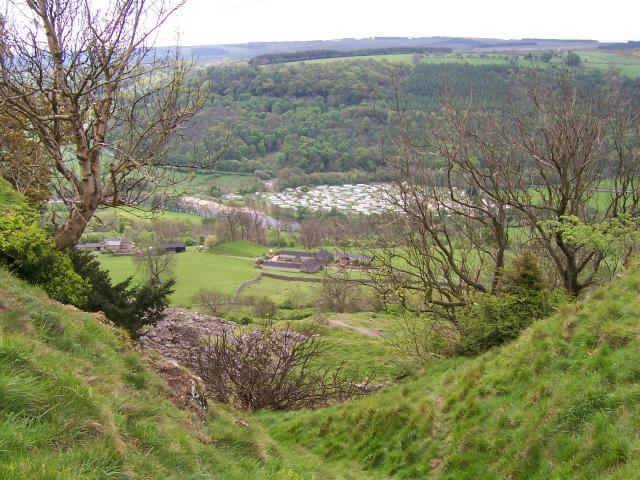
East Applegarth and Swaleview Caravan Park

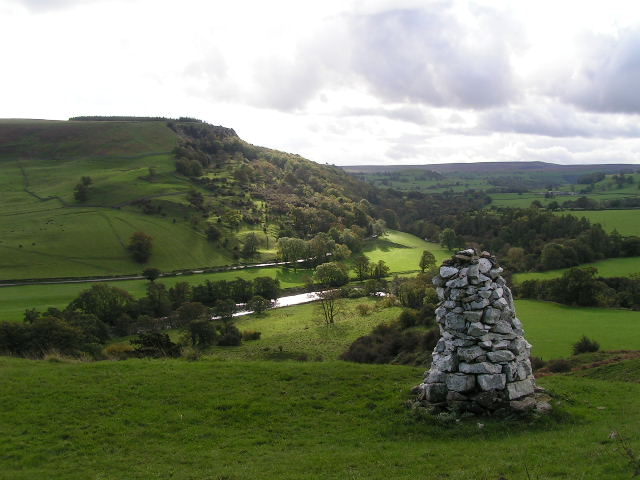
View from Applegarth Scar

Applegarth is a historic settlement located north of the River Swale in Yorkshire, England. It lies about three-quarters of a mile north-east of the village of Marske.

== Description ==
Applegarth now encompasses West Applegarth, High Applegarth, East Applegarth, Low Applegarth and Applegarth Low Wood, and includes the limestone crag of Applegarth Scar. Applegarth bridleway runs along the valley through the settlement, and is still a bridleway despite an attempt to have it downgraded in 2010.

== History ==
The name Applegarth has Norse origins. A mansion stood on the site now occupied by West Applegarth farm, and the land to the north of Applegarth Scar was wild forest, with wolves and fallow deer. Applegarth was part of the manor of Ravensworth which belonged for many years to the FitzHughs. Applegarth Forest was described as picturesque and delightful in 1791.

In 1250, free warren in Applegarth was granted to Henry, son of Ralph de Ravenswath, and at the time of Kirkby's Inquest of 1284, Robert de Applegarth, a bailiff of Richmond, held a carucate of land at Applegarth under Hugh Fitz Henry. The FitzHughs continued to own Applegarth until the sixteenth century, when it passed to William Parr, 1st Marquess of Northampton. Parr granted Applegarth to a faithful retainer, Thomas son of Geoffrey Middleton, who lived there with his wife and large family. Thomas died in 1565, and the inventory of his effects includes eleven horses, fifteen cows, silver plate, his best suit of yellow satin and two other suits, his coat of steel and a crimson velvet coat of cloth of gold.

When Parr died without heir in 1571, the manor of Ravenswath, including Applegarth, passed to the crown, and King Charles I granted the estate to the citizens of London in 1629, who sold it to two brothers, Jerome and John Robinson of St. Trinians, near Richmond. John resided in Applegarth for some time and died in 1656. His granddaughters sold Applegarth in 1675 to Sir Thomas Wharton, from whom it passed to Elizabeth Byerley in 1764, then to her five cousins. It was subsequently sold to James Hutchinson MD in 1788, then to John Hutton in 1814.

== Facilities ==
Swaleview Caravan Park is close to East Applegarth Farm and near to the River Swale, and dates from the 1960s.
