= Courthouse Museum =

Museum in Ripon, North Yorkshire, England

Coordinates: 54.1357°N 1.5209°W

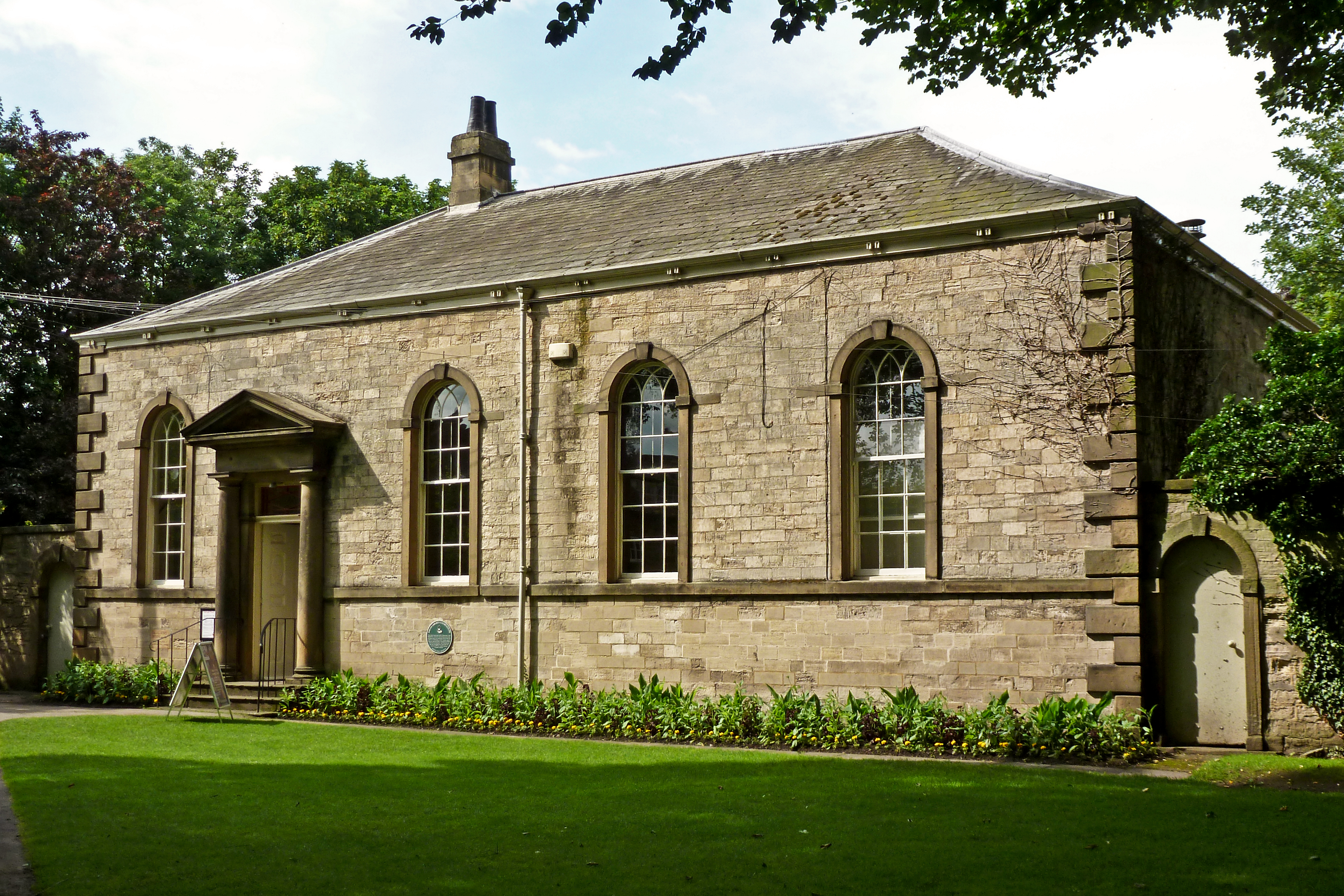
The building, in 2012

The Courthouse Museum is a museum in a historic building in Ripon, a city in North Yorkshire, in England.

The court house was constructed to house the Quarter Sessions for the Liberty of Ripon. It was designed by William Walker and completed in 1830. It probably lies on the site of an earlier court, and reuses some mediaeval stones. In 1953, the building became a magistrates' court. It was extended in 1981, but closed in 1998. In 2000, it was purchased by the Ripon Museums Trust and reopened as a museum, and in 2005 it was redecorated in its original colour scheme. The exhibition in the museum focuses on the history of the court.

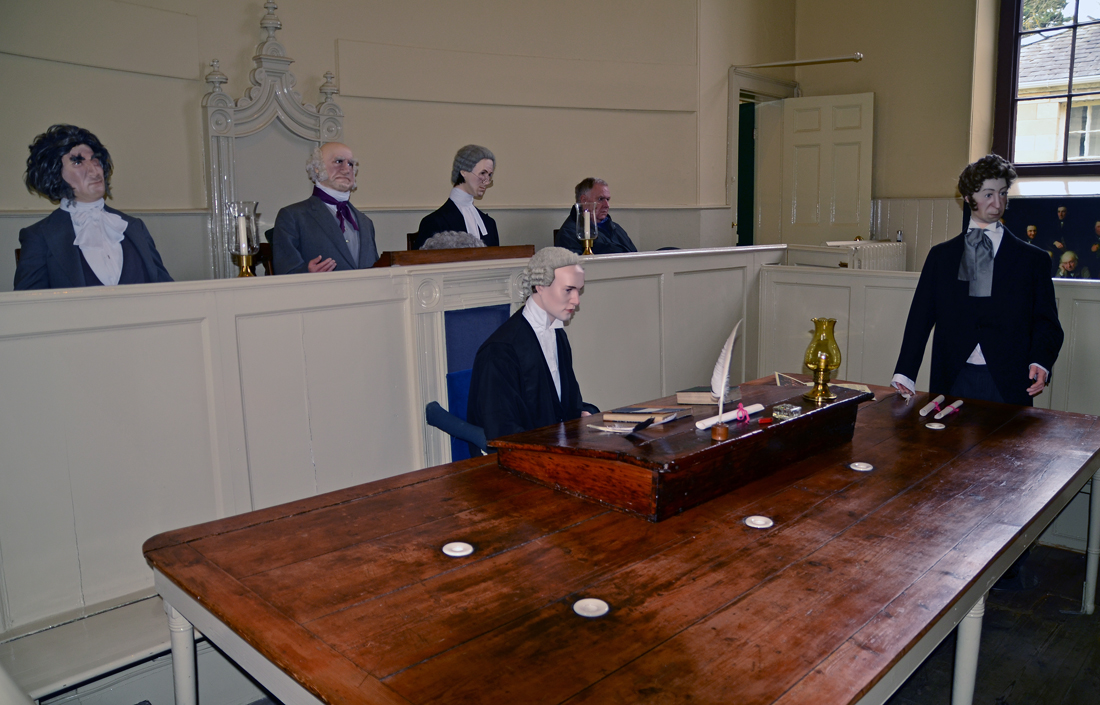
The courtroom

The building is constructed from stone on a plinth, with quoins, a sill band, moulded eaves, and a hipped slate roof. There is one storey and five bays. The doorway has two Doric columns, an entablature, an oblong fanlight and a pediment. The windows are round-headed sashes with impost blocks and keystones. There are flanking coped walls, each containing a round-headed doorway with impost blocks and a keystone. Inside, there is a through passage, with the jury room and justice's retiring room to the west, and the court room to the west. The court room is well preserved and includes two jury boxes, boxes for defendants, witnesses, bailiffs and prisoners around a central table, a public gallery, the clerk's chair, judge's seat, and royal coat of arms above.

== See also ==
- Grade II* listed buildings in North Yorkshire (district)
- Listed buildings in Ripon
