= New Forest, North Yorkshire =

Civil parish in North Yorkshire, England

Coordinates: 54.443°N 1.902°W

New Forest
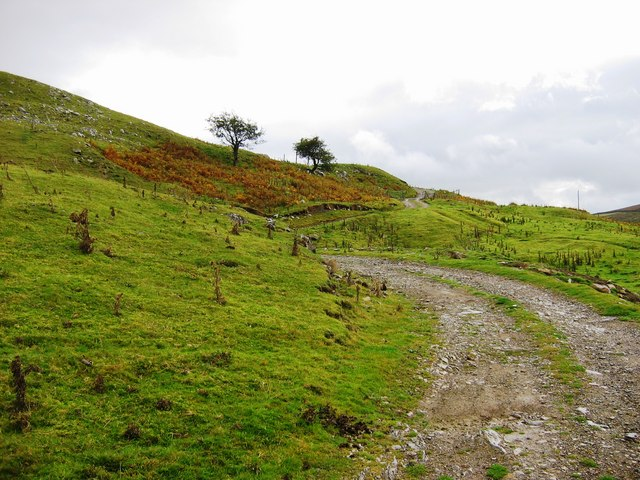
- Ascent to Holgate Moor

- Location within North Yorkshire
- Population: 10
- Civil parish: New Forest
- Unitary authority: North Yorkshire
- Ceremonial county: North Yorkshire
- Region: Yorkshire and the Humber
- Country: England
- Sovereign state: United Kingdom

New Forest is a civil parish in North Yorkshire, England, located 6 miles (10 km) west of Richmond.

The parish lacks a village and primarily consists of grouse moor and isolated farms, including Helwith, Holgate, Kexwith, and Kersey Green. The estimated population of the parish is 10.

During Norman times, the New Forest was a hunting forest held by the Earls of Richmond along with the forest of Arkengarthdale to the west. Lead and coal mines operated in the forest during the Middle Ages. Until 1866, it was a township within the large ancient parish of Kirkby Ravensworth, after which it became a separate civil parish.

The civil parish now shares a grouped parish council with the civil parish of Marske, known as Marske & New Forest Parish Council. From 1974 to 2023 it was part of the district of Richmondshire, it is now administered by the unitary North Yorkshire Council.

== See also ==
- Listed buildings in New Forest, North Yorkshire
