= John Hutton (1659–1731) =

British politician

John Hutton (14 July 1659 – 2 March 1731) of Marske near Richmond, North Yorkshire was a British politician. He was the Member of Parliament for Richmond, Yorkshire in 1701–1702. In 1697 he was Captain of the Richmondshire Troop, North Riding Militia Horse.

His son, Matthew Hutton, became archbishop of York and archbishop of Canterbury, following in the footsteps of their ancestor, Matthew Hutton.

He died aged 71.
