= Prison & Police Museum =

Museum in Ripon, North Yorkshire, England

Coordinates: 54.1368°N 1.5185°W

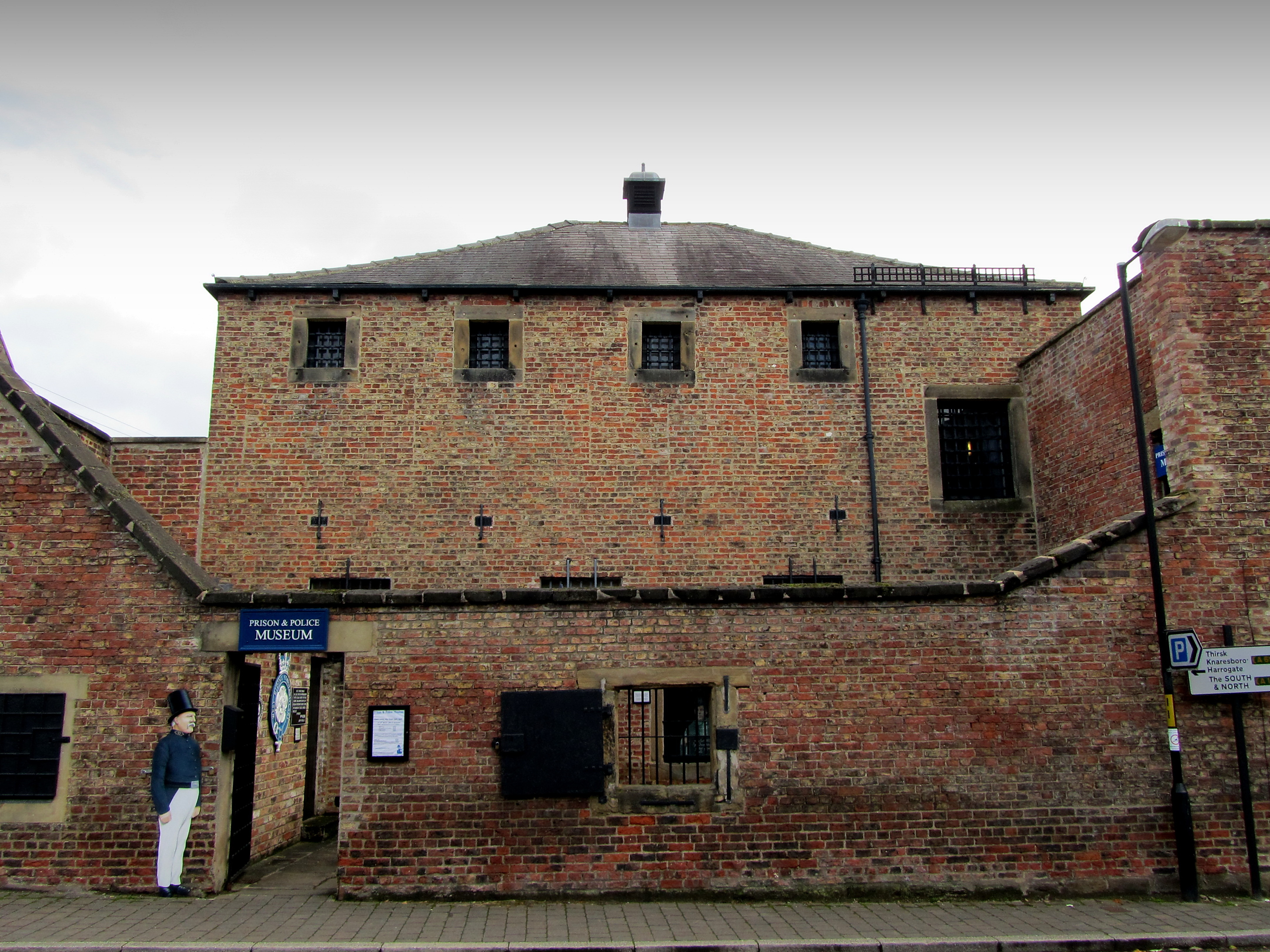
The museum, in 2012

The Prison & Police Museum is a museum in Ripon, a city in North Yorkshire, in England.

The building housing the museum was constructed in 1685, as a prison. In 1816, it was extended to provide additional cells at the rear, the new work being designed by Thomas de Grey, 2nd Earl de Grey. The top floor and two eastern bays may be of similar date but could be part of the original building. In 1878, the prison closed and the building was instead used to store grain. In 1887, it was purchased by the new West Riding Constabulary, to serve as a police station. This closed in 1958, and it was converted into a private house named Deans Croft. The front part of the building was restored in 1972. The building has been grade II* listed since 1949.

In 1984, the building was purchased by Ripon Museums Trust, which converted it into the Prison & Police Museum. The museum was refurbished in 2004. Its collection includes a wide variety of police and prison related objects, such as uniforms and a police box.

The building is rendered, and has a floor band and a stone slate roof. There are three storeys and a partial basement, and six bays, and the windows are mullioned. The former cell block is in brown brick with wooden brackets to the eaves, and has two storeys. On both floors are iron-barred windows. Inside, the cell block is brick vaulted and has floors of stone flags. The staircase has an iron balustrade, and there are heavy iron doors with their original locks.

== See also ==
- Grade II* listed buildings in North Yorkshire (district)
- Listed buildings in Ripon
