= Swaledale Festival =

Music festival held in Swaledale, North Yorkshire, England

Coordinates: 54.3812°N 1.9304°W

The Swaledale Festival takes place over two weeks in May and June each year, in churches, chapels, castles, ‘Literary Institutes’, pubs, fields and village halls scattered around Swaledale, Arkengarthdale and Wensleydale. The largest venues seat about 400 people; the smallest venues as few as 40. The main focus of the Festival is on small-scale classical chamber music. Choral music, folk music, brass bands and jazz also feature, as do talks, films, exhibitions, poetry readings, workshops and guided walks. Among others, the festival has featured the Royal Northern Sinfonia, Natalie Clein, Nicholas Daniel, Don Paterson, Emma Johnson, Julian Perkins, Martin Simpson, Martin Taylor and the Navarra Quartet.

In 2011, the Festival was described by The Guardian as one of the 10 best classical music festivals, and by the Daily Telegraph as one of the 25 opera and classical festivals of the season. The Guardian again featured the Festival in its 2012 and 2013 Festival Guides, in a short list which included Aldeburgh, the BBC Proms, Bath, Cheltenham and Glyndebourne. The Festival attracts around 7,000 visitors a year.

A key feature of the Swaledale Festival is the commitment to new commissions and recently composed works; commissioned pieces by Sir Richard Rodney Bennett, Michael Brough and Heather Fenoughty received their premières in 2012, and the 2013 Festival included premières of works by Sally Beamish, David Blake, Stephen Goss, Tim Garland, Roland Dyens and Graham Coatman.

== Early history ==
The early history of the Swaledale Festival is in several strands, which merged in the 1980s.

=== The Richmondshire Festival ===
The biennial Richmondshire Festival was founded in 1965 by Dr A J Bull, the retired music organiser for the North Riding of Yorkshire. A week of music and drama in and around Richmond, it was initially scheduled for September in order to attract motorists on their way south from the Edinburgh Festival. Musical highlights of the first Richmondshire Festival included a recital at Aske Hall by the Melos Ensemble, with Gervase de Peyer, Cecil Aronowitz and Emanuel Hurwitz, and a concert at the County Modern School by the Northern Sinfonia Orchestra, as it was then known. There were also performances by local school, amateur and scratch groups, tea-dances, talent contests, and military bands beating the retreat.

The 1967 Richmondshire Festival programme lists Arthur Bull as the "Hon. Organiser", and the Marquess of Zetland as Patron. There are no known records for the next decade. In 1969 the Richmondshire Festival moved to a May date, and by 1978 Dr Bull had started to look for a successor.

=== Two festivals in partnership ===
Early records of the Swaledale Festival are patchy, and as recently as 2012 it was still believed that the Festival had been established in 1980. It now appears that the Festival was started by members of the Delmé Quartet who were then resident in the Upper Swaledale village of Muker, in September 1972. By July 1973 the Festival was essentially a chamber-music event with a summer-school component. A surviving Swaledale Festival concert programme from June 1978 makes no mention of the Delmé Quartet, though Delmé cellist Joy Hall was among the performers.

In 1979, the violinist Trevor Woolston moved to Swaledale. In 1980 he ran a fundraiser concert for the Sunday School in Fremington. In 1981 Woolston ran an expanded series (ten events, most in St Andrew's Church, Grinton) “as part of the Richmondshire Festival”. This included concerts by the Lindsay String Quartet and the Yorkshire Baroque Soloists, who would become regular visitors.

There is no primary evidence that the concerts of 1980 and 81 took place under the Swaledale banner. However, there being no Richmondshire Festival in 1982, as Trevor Woolston wrote, "a Swaledale Festival was arranged". It now seems clear that over the span of three years Woolston translated his programming across to an already established venture.

In 1983, the Richmondshire and Swaledale Festivals ran in partnership over three full weeks. As far as can be inferred from the available programmes, there was strict demarcation between the two: Richmondshire limited itself to odd years and to the immediate area of Richmond; Swaledale was annual, and went no further down-dale than Marrick.

In 1984 drama and crafts were added to the Swaledale Festival. In 1985 the two Festivals again ran in parallel. In 1986 the Swaledale Festival Friends were formed.

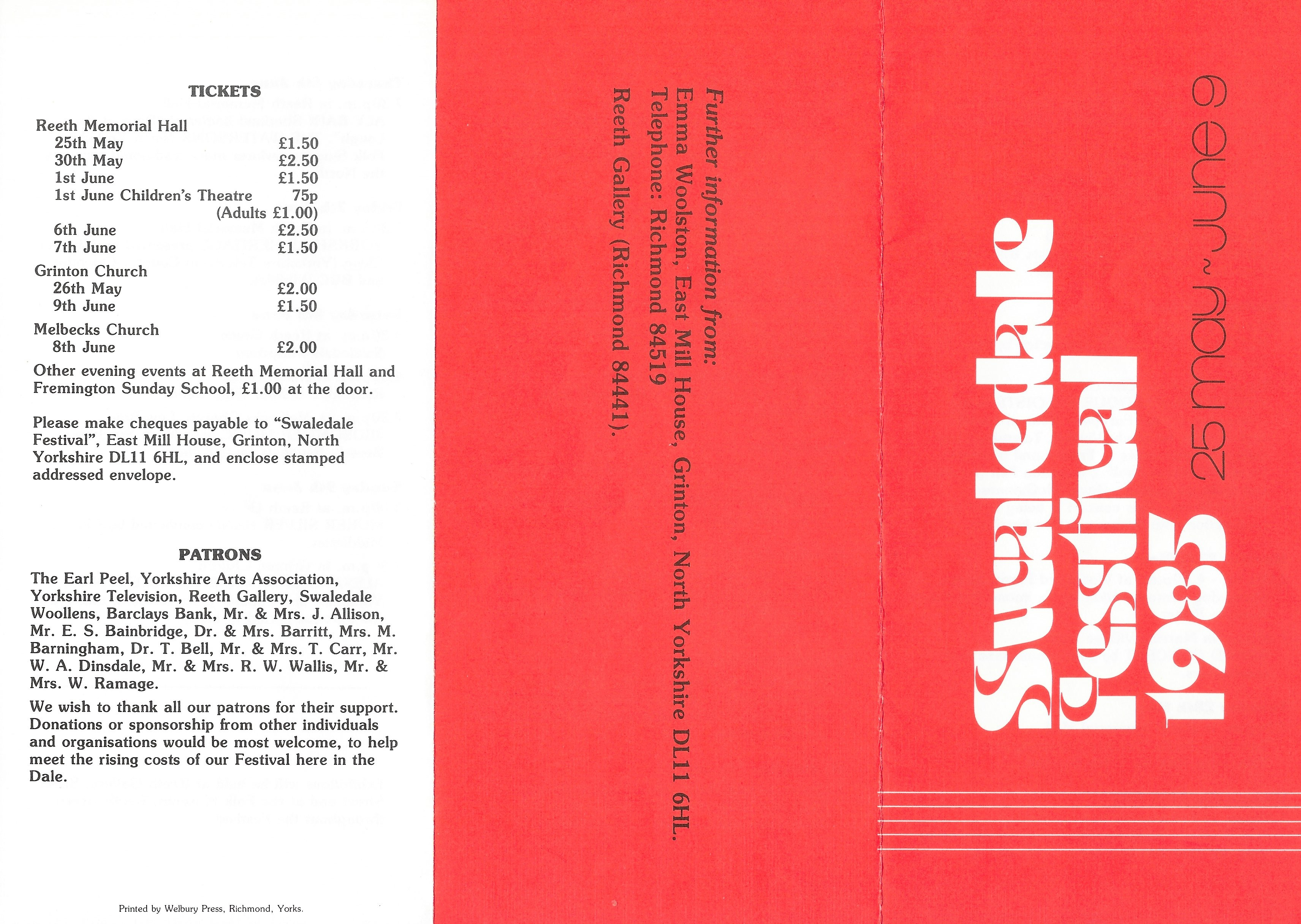
Festival programme 1985 (supplied by Susanna Pell, of the Yorkshire Baroque Soloists)

=== Swaledale goes it alone ===
The Richmondshire Festival folded in 1987, and the Swaledale Festival "took over" several Richmondshire Festival artists, including Northern Sinfonia, and expanded down-dale into Richmond. Also in 1987, an international element was added, with performers from Bolivia and Finland.

In 1988 the Swaledale Festival expanded its geographical coverage again, with concerts in Wensleydale. By 1989 the Festival was active from Keld in Upper Swaledale to Bedale in Lower Wensleydale, and Trevor Woolston joked about changing the Festival's name to "The Festival of the Upper Dales, Richmondshire and the Teesside Hinterland". Also in 1989 the Festival gained an 'Autumn Encore', half a dozen events in October and November. Performers that year included the Fitzwilliam Quartet, which would become a Festival regular. By 1991, part-time staff and volunteers had been recruited to look after administration and publicity, and the Woolstons were preparing to retire. The last Autumn Encore took place in 1992.

In 1993 Elizabeth Carter was appointed artistic director, a post she would hold until 2002; Trevor Woolston stepped down, though he would continue to appear at the Festival as a performer. Also in 1993, the Festival became a registered charity with a formalised constitution and a board. The first recorded chairman was the composer David Blake, a professor at York University and a resident in Askrigg; and the first board members included Katherine Carr, the daughter of the late Dr Bull - a nice piece of continuity.

== See also ==
- Swaledale Museum
