= Swaledale cheese =

English hard cheese made in North Yorkshire

Swaledale
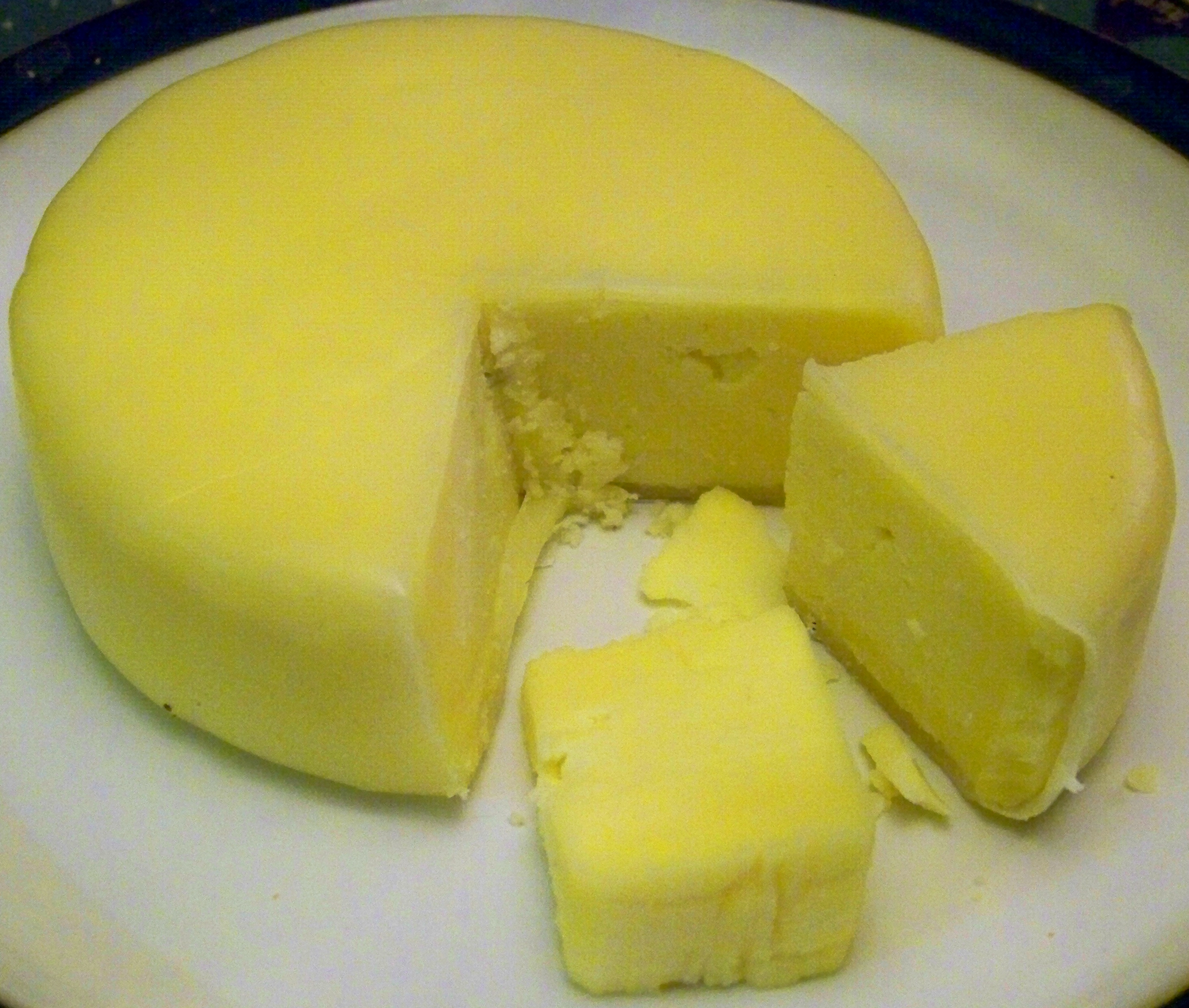
- Country of origin: England
- Region: Swaledale, North Yorkshire
- Town: Richmond
- Source of milk: Ewe/Cow
- Pasteurised: Unpasteurised
- Texture: Medium firm
- Weight: average 2.25 kg (5 lb)
- Named after: Swaledale

Swaledale is a full fat hard cheese produced in the town of Richmond in Swaledale, North Yorkshire, England. The cheese is produced from cows’ milk, Swaledale sheep's milk and goats’ milk.

== Description ==
The cheeses are round in shape with an average weight for the cheese wheel of 2.25 kilograms (5 lb) and are made with unpasteurised milk. The animals whose milk is used to make Swaledale cheese, all graze on land in Swaledale which makes their milk characteristic of the area as a particular mixture of herbs and grasses grow there due to its soil and climate and this give the cheese distinctive properties. The cheese has a moist medium firm texture and its flavour is described as having “the freshness of the misty Dales and wild bracken, with the sweet caramel undertone of ewes’ milk”.

== Production ==
Swaledale cheese is handmade to a recipe from Swaledale, the knowledge of which is limited to a few people. Milk from farms in Swaledale is collected and, in the first stage of the cheesemaking process, heated to 28 °C (82 °F) with microbiological culture. After being left for two hours rennet is added to the milk. The mixture is then left to curdle for an hour after which time the resulting curd is heated to 28 °C, cut up and stirred. It is then cut up again, drained and the resulting cubes stacked up, before the blocks are broken up and then put into moulds lined with muslin. The moulds are then lightly pressed during storage at 28 °C for 18 hours, and are turned once after four hours. Once the cheese has finished being pressed it is removed from the moulds and is soaked in a solution of 85% brine for 24 hours.

After being made Swaledale cheese is stored in humid cellars. While the cheese is maturing, if it is not covered in natural wax, a grey-blue mould grows on its rind. The cheese takes between three and four weeks to mature.

== History ==
Legends about the Yorkshire Dales, the area that includes Swaledale, say the origin of cheese making lie with Cistercian monks from Normandy who settled in the area in the 11th century. Their techniques were passed on to local farmers in Swaledale who continued to produce cheese, although the monks left during the dissolution of the monasteries. In 18th century cheese was produced at farmhouses within Swaledale and sold fresh with a white colour or ripe once they had developed a blue colouration. These cheeses' high moisture content and open texture allowed them to blue easily when they were matured in damp conditions. Cheesemaking started to decline in Swaledale at the start of the 20th century and by 1980 only one farm in Swaledale, Harkerside above Reeth, was still making cheese. In the early 1980s this cheese stopped being produced as well, until Mrs Longstaff gave the original recipe for Swaledale cheese to David and Mandy Reed who founded the Swaledale Cheese company in February 1987 to produce the cheese.

== Awards ==
Swaledale cheeses have won a number of awards including three gold awards at the 2008 Great Taste Awards and three gold and two bronze medals at 2008 World Cheese Awards.

== See also ==
- List of cheeses
