= Swaledale =

Valley in North Yorkshire, England

Coordinates: 54.361°N 1.838°W

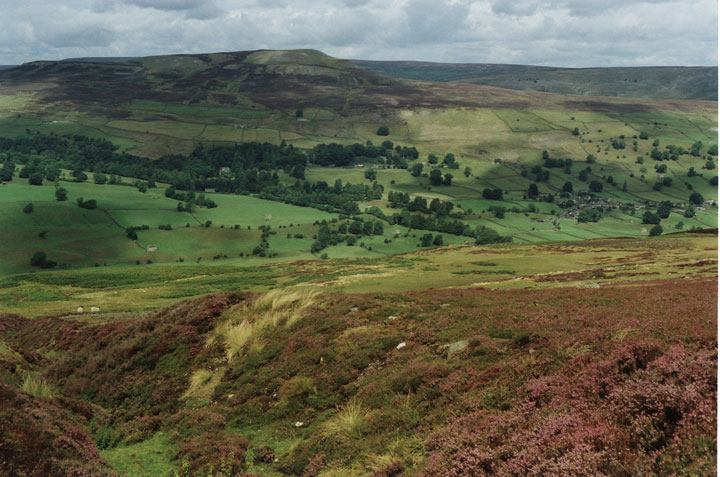
Swaledale

Swaledale is a valley in North Yorkshire, England. It is one of the Yorkshire Dales, which are part of the Pennines, and within the Yorkshire Dales National Park. It is named after the River Swale, which runs through it. Swaledale is the most northerly of the major dales.

== Geographical overview ==
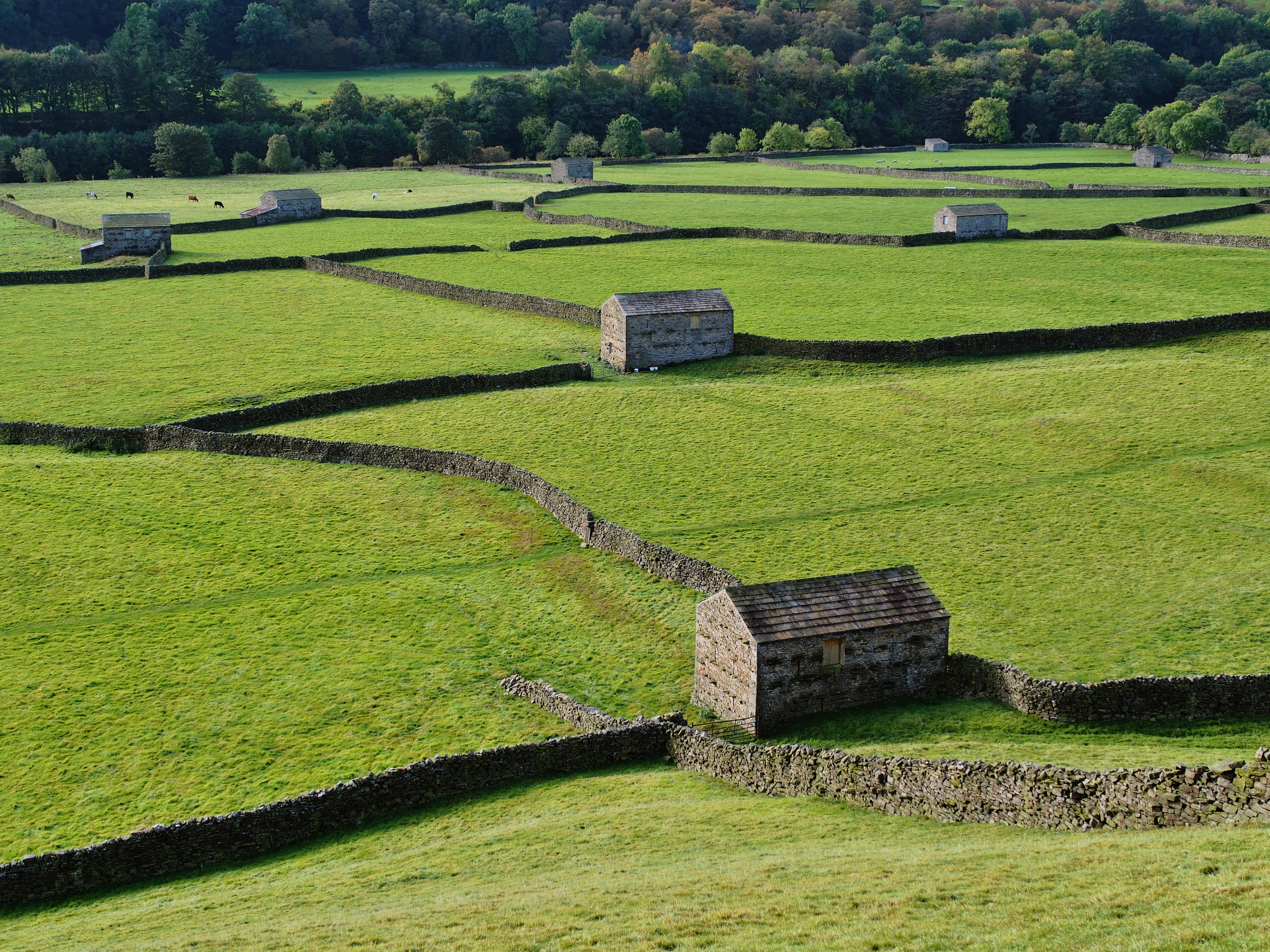
Fields in Gunnerside, Swaledale

Swaledale runs broadly from west to east, from the high moors on the Cumbria–Yorkshire boundary at the watershed of Northern England to the market town of Richmond, where the dale meets the lowlands. Nine Standards Rigg, the prominent ridge with nine ancient tall cairns, rises on the watershed at the head of Swaledale. To the south and east of the ridge a number of smaller dales (Birkdale, Little Sleddale, Great Sleddale and Whitsundale) join to form the narrow valley of upper Swaledale at the small village of Keld. From there, the valley runs briefly south then turns east at Thwaite to broaden progressively as it passes Muker, Gunnerside, Low Row, Healaugh and Reeth.

The Pennine valley ends at Richmond, where an important medieval castle overlooks an ancient ford from the top of a cliff. Below Richmond, the valley sides flatten out and the Swale flows across lowland farmland to meet the Ure just east of Boroughbridge at a point known as Swale Nab. The Ure becomes the Ouse, and eventually (on merging with the Trent) the Humber.

From the north, Arkengarthdale and its river the Arkle Beck join Swaledale at Reeth. To the south, Wensleydale, home of the famous Wensleydale cheese, runs parallel with Swaledale. The two dales are separated by a ridge including Great Shunner Fell, and joined by the road over Buttertubs Pass.

== Physical character ==
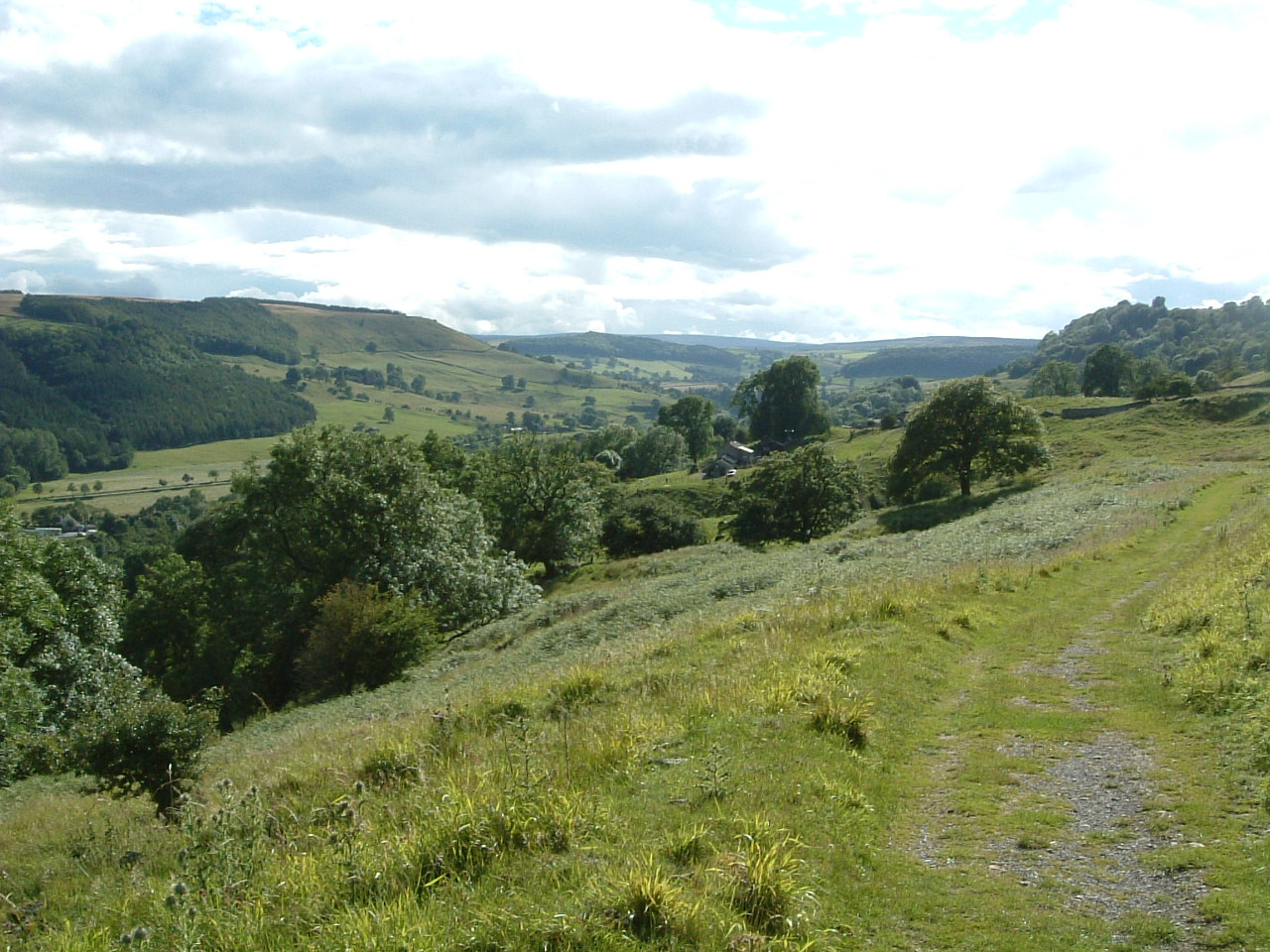
Swaledale at East Applegarth, near Richmond

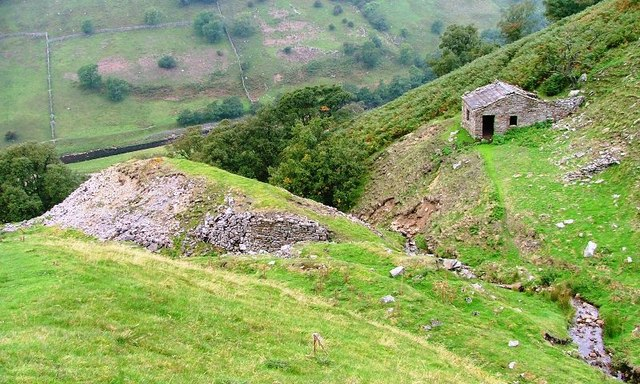
Ruined mine shop at Arn Gill

Swaledale is a typical limestone Yorkshire dale, with its narrow valley-bottom road, green meadows and fellside fields, white sheep and dry stone walls on the glacier-formed valley sides, and darker moorland skyline. The upper parts of the dale are particularly striking because of its large old limestone field barns and its profusion of wild flowers. The latter are thanks to the return to the practice of leaving the cutting of grass for hay or silage until wild plants have had a chance to seed. Occasionally visible from the valley bottom road are the slowly fading fellside scars of the 18th and 19th century lead mining industry. Ruined stone mine buildings remain, taking on the same colours as the landscape into which they are crumbling. In 1989, Swaledale (and Arkengarthdale) were designated as a Barns and Walls Conservation Area, making it the largest conservation area in the United Kingdom.

Swaledale is home to a number of waterfalls, such as Richmond Falls, Kisdon Force and Catrake Force.

== Agriculture and industry ==
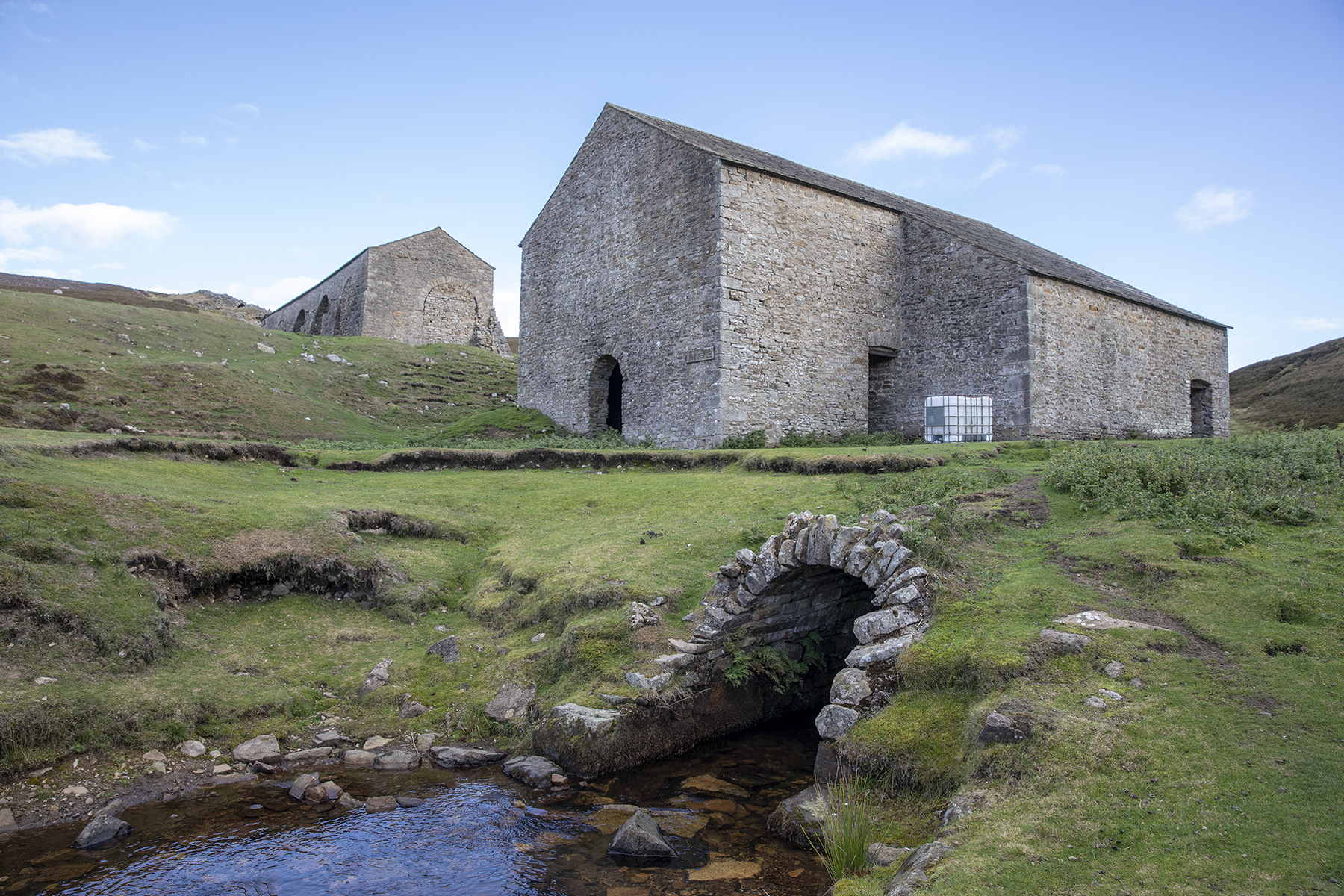
The Grinton smelt mill site

Sheep-farming has always been central to economic life in Swaledale, which has lent its name to a breed of round-horned sheep. Traditional Swaledale products are woollens and Swaledale cheese, which was formerly made from ewe’s milk. These days it is made from cow’s milk. Starting in the 1700s, and continuing into the 20th century, a major industry in the area was lead mining carried out in Arkengarthdale and at Grinton Moor. Today, Grinton Smelt Mill, a Scheduled Monument, is considered to be the best preserved of its type in the Dales.

== Current human activities ==
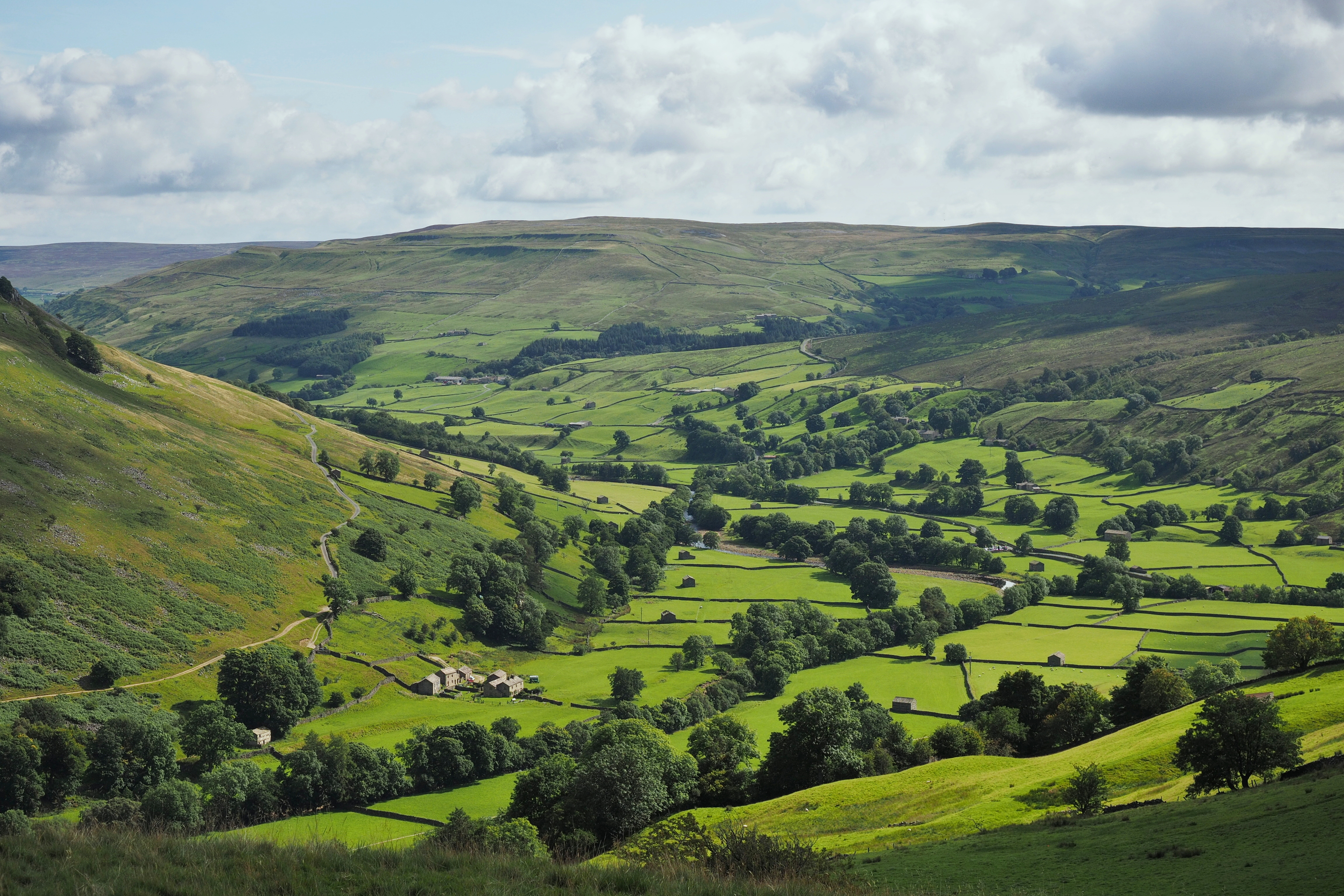
Swaledale

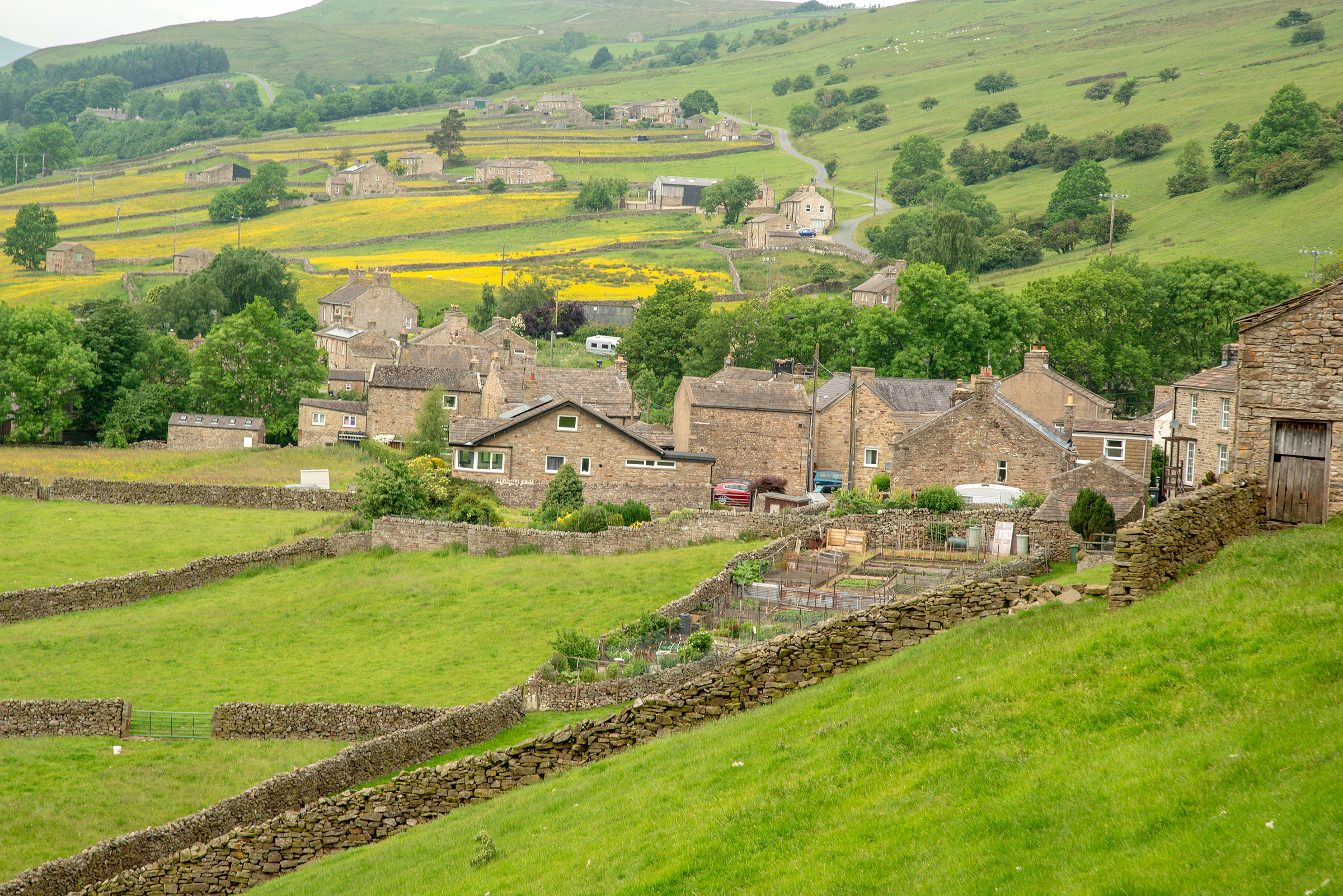
Approaching Gunnerside

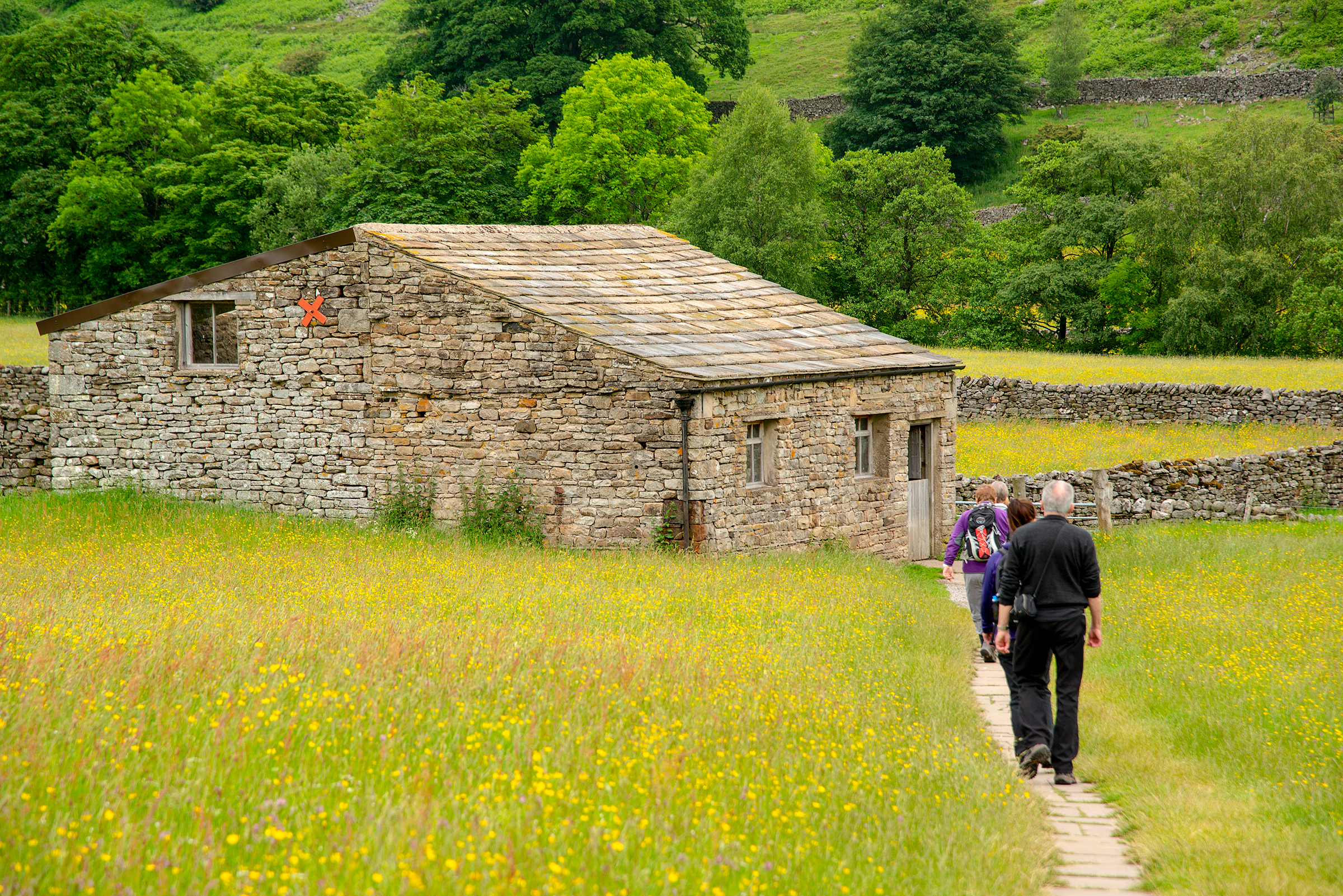
Ramblers (walkers) near a field barn in Muker; the barns are known as "cow'uses" or cow houses in Swaledale

Today, tourism has become important, and Swaledale attracts thousands of visitors a year. It is popular with walkers, particularly because the Coast to Coast Walk passes along it. Unlike Wensleydale it has no large settlements on the scale of Hawes or Leyburn, nor an obvious tourist hook such as the former's connection with James Herriot, and so, like Coverdale, it enjoys a quieter tone, especially as it is more remote compared to, say, Wharfedale, which is much further south and easily accessible from the major city of Leeds and its metropolitan area. The market town of Richmond is promoted as offering "an abundance of places to explore" including Richmond Castle and history museums and in 2021, a North Yorkshire publication particularly recommended the small villages of Gunnerside, Muker and Keld to visitors.

In May and June every year, Swaledale hosts the two-week-long Swaledale Festival, which combines a celebration of small-scale music and a programme of guided walks.

The first weekend in August sees the area host the 'Ard Rock mountain bike festival, which is based in Reeth but uses bridleways and private land in both Swaledale and Arkengarthdale.

Since 1950, Swaledale has been the host of the Scott Trial, a British motorcycle trials competition run over an off-road course of approximately 70 miles (110 kilometres), raising money for the "Scott charities", a range of local non-profit making organisations. The events were still running as of 2023.

Ravenseat, the farm of Amanda Owen ("The Yorkshire Shepherdess"), is in Swaledale.

== Swaledale in literature ==
In a letter to Geoffrey Grigson of 17 January 1950, the poet W. H. Auden wrote, "My great good place is the part of the Pennines bounded on the S by Swaledale, on the N by the Roman wall and on the W by the Eden Valley".

== Swaledale in song ==
In the song "Old Molly Metcalfe", from the 1972 album Bantam Cock, Jake Thackray sings of his late great-aunt Molly, who was a shepperdess. Having lived and died in Swaledale, she is portrayed as singing and counting her sheep in a Swaledale version of the Cumbric base-20 counting system generally known as Yan tan tethera. As the specific words for the numbers vary greatly across regions and even Swaledale itself, the dialect words listed under Swaledale are just those that Jake Thackray used.

== See also ==
- Swaledale Festival
- Swaledale Museum
