= Healaugh =

Healaugh may refer to the following places in North Yorkshire, England:

- Healaugh, Richmondshire, village in Swaledale
- Healaugh, Selby, village in Selby district
