= Fremington =

Fremington can refer to:

- Fremington, Devon, England
- Fremington, North Yorkshire, England
