= Listed buildings in Reeth, Fremington and Healaugh =

Reeth, Fremington and Healaugh is a civil parish in the county of North Yorkshire, England. It contains 58 listed buildings that are recorded in the National Heritage List for England. Of these, one is listed at Grade II*, the middle of the three grades, and the others are at Grade II, the lowest grade. The parish contains the villages of Reeth, Fremington and Healaugh, and the surrounding countryside. In the villages, most of the listed buildings are houses, cottages and associated structures, and shops. In the countryside are listed farmhouses and farm buildings, and there are the ruined remains of two lead smelt mills that are listed. The other listed buildings include churches and chapels, hotels and public houses, bridges, a former watermill, a former sawmill, a former mortuary, and two water pumps.

== Key ==
Grade	Criteria
II*	Particularly important buildings of more than special interest
II	Buildings of national importance and special interest

== Buildings ==
Name and location	Photograph	Date	Notes	Grade
Townend Hall Farmhouse; 54.39235°N 1.94293°W		Mid-16th century	The farmhouse is in stone on a plinth, and has a stone slate roof with gable coping. There are two storeys, three bays, and a rear outshut. On the front is a porch with a side door, there is one fixed window, and the other windows are sashes in chamfered stone surrounds.	II
The Green; 54.38821°N 1.94235°W		17th century	Two cottages and a stable combined into a house, it is in stone and has a stone slate roof with a coped gable and shaped kneeler to the right. There are two storeys and three bays. On the front are three doorways; the left with a plain surround, the middle one with a massive chamfered stone surround, and the right with a pulvinated frieze and a moulded cornice. The windows are a mix of casements, sashes and fixed windows.	II
Raw Croft Old Farmhouse; 54.40914°N 1.96422°W		1653	The farmhouse is in rendered stone, and has a stone slate roof with gable coping and shaped kneelers. There are two storeys and two bays. The ground floor contains a doorway with a moulded surround and a dated lintel, flanked by two-light mullioned windows. On the upper floor is a small opening flanked by horizontally-sliding sash windows.	II
Crow Tree House; 54.38668°N 1.97471°W	—	Mid to late 17th century	The house is in stone with a stone slate roof, two storeys and three bays. The central doorway has a chamfered surround and a triangular head. To its left is a sash window, and to the right is a fixed window. The upper floor contains a casement window flanked by horizontally sliding sashes, that to the left with a chamfered surround.	II
High Bank House; 54.39156°N 1.92833°W	—	1692	The house is in stone with quoins and a Westmorland slate roof. There are two storeys, three bays, and a rear outshut. The doorway has a chamfered surround, and a depressed triangular head containing the date. Above it is a single-light window with a chamfered surround, at the left of the ground floor is a fire window with a chamfered surround, and the other windows are sashes.	II
Raw Croft New Farmhouse and farm buildings 54.41001°N 1.96610°W		1708	The oldest building is the right barn, and the farmhouse is dated 1799. The buildings are in stone, and they have roofs in stone slate with shaped kneelers and gable coping. The farmhouse has two storeys and two bays. The doorway has a stone surround and an initialled and dated lintel, and the windows are sashes in stone surrounds. The left barn has two storeys and one bay, and contains a doorway, and a pitching door above. The right barn has two storeys and three bays, and contains a doorway with a depressed triangular head, initials and a date. To the right is a blocked arch and fixed windows in blocked doorways, and the upper floor contains a pitching door and windows.	II
Raisbeck House; 54.38650°N 1.97542°W	—	1723	A house, and a former stable incorporated into the house, in stone with a stone slate roof. There are two storeys and five bays. The main doorway has a stone surround, and above it is an initialled datestone, and there is another doorway in the former stable. To the left of the main doorway is a fire window, and above it is a fixed window, both with a moulded architrave. The other windows are sashes, those in the main house with moulded lintels.	II
Lea House; 54.38643°N 1.97557°W	—	Early 18th century	A house and cottage, later combined, with a stone slate roof, a shaped kneeler and gable coping. There are two storeys and four bays. On the front is a doorway, and to the left a blocked doorway containing a casement window. The windows elsewhere are casements, most in moulded architraves.	II
Old Castle Farmhouse and byre 54.40429°N 1.95367°W	—	Early 18th century	The house and byre are in stone, with a stone slate roof and gable coping and a shaped kneeler on the right. The house has two storeys and two bays, and a rear outshut. On the front is a doorway, there is one fire window, the other windows are casements, and all have chamfered surrounds. The byre to the right has a board door, two stable doors, and a fixed window.	II
Wing north of Draycott Hall; 54.38625°N 1.93097°W	—	1730	A service wing, later converted into flats, it is in stone, with a band and a blind parapet. There are two storeys and seven bays. On the front are doorways and an initialled datestone. There is one fixed window, and the others are sashes in stone surrounds.	II
The King's Arms; 54.38903°N 1.94320°W		1734	The hotel is in stone, with rusticated quoins, and an M-shaped stone slate roof with gable coping and shaped kneelers. There are three storeys, a double depth plan, and two parallel ranges of four bays. The doorway has a stone surround, a pulvinated frieze, and a moulded cornice, above which is an initialled datestone. The windows are sashes in stone surrounds.	II
The Half Moon; 54.38867°N 1.94328°W		c. 1740	The building is in stone, with quoins, and a stone slate roof with gable coping and shaped kneelers. There are three storeys, two bays on the north front, and the gable end faces the street. On the north front is an external staircase leading to a doorway in the middle floor, to its left are sash windows, and to the right are two tall fixed windows, all these openings with a brick lintel and keystone. On the gable end is a doorway with a massive stone surround, to its left is a square bay window, and the upper floors contain sash windows.	II
Raw Bank House; 54.41078°N 1.98820°W	—	1743	The farmhouse is in stone, rendered at the front, and has a stone slate roof with gable coping and a shaped kneeler on the left. There are two storeys and two bays, and an outshut on the right. On the front is a porch, a doorway with a plain surround, and a dated and initialled lintel. The windows are sashes in plain surrounds.	II
Barney Beck High Bridge; 54.38548°N 1.98086°W		18th century (probable)	The bridge carries Morley Road over Barney Beck. It is in stone, and consists of a single segmental arch with a band and a plain parapet.	II
Surrender Bridge; 54.39456°N 2.01909°W		18th century	The road bridge is in stone, and consists of a single arch.	II
The Black Bull; 54.38882°N 1.94330°W		Mid-18th century	Two houses, later a hotel, in whitewashed stone with a stone slate roof. There are three storeys and seven bays. On the ground floor, towards the left, is a doorway with a plain surround and a moulded cornice. To the right is a double-bowed shopfront containing a central window with Tuscan pilasters and a segmental pediment, and to its right is a doorway with plain surround and a moulded open pediment. The other windows are sashes.	II
Upnadown; 54.38642°N 1.93278°W	—	Mid-18th century	A farmhouse and attached barn in stone, the house is rendered, and there is a stone slate roof with shaped kneelers and gable coping. There are two storeys and five bays, three on the main range. On the front are two doorways, and the windows are a mix; some are fixed, there is a casement window, and the others are sashes, some horizontally sliding.	II
Victoria Cottage; 54.38892°N 1.94327°W		Mid-18th century	The house, at one time a shop, it is in rendered stone, and has a stone slate roof with gable coping and a shaped kneeler on the right. There are three storeys and one bay. On the ground floor is a doorway and a canted bay window to the right, and the upper floors contain sash windows.	II
Burgoyne Hotel and front railings 54.38969°N 1.94233°W		Mid to late 18th century	The hotel is in stone, with rusticated quoins, and a stone slate roof with shaped kneelers and gable coping. There are three storeys, a central block of five bays, and later recessed one-bay wings. The central doorway has pilasters, a plain frieze and a pediment. On the top floor are fixed windows in moulded surrounds, and elsewhere the windows are sashes, those in the main block in moulded architraves. In each wing, on the ground floor is a French window flanked by sashes with pilasters and an entablature, and on the middle floor the windows are tripartite with pilasters, an entablature and a pediment. At the front is a low wall, and cast iron railings and gates with fleur-de-lys finials.	II
Sorrel Sykes and Welbecks; 54.38804°N 1.94171°W	—	Mid to late 18th century	A house divided into two houses, in stone, with a stone slate roof, shaped kneelers and gable coping. There are two storeys and four bays. The left doorway has pilasters, a plain frieze and a moulded cornice. The right doorway has a stone surround and a fanlight. There is one small blocked window with a chamfered surround, and the other windows are sashes, those in the left house with keystones.	II
The Olde Temperance; 54.38835°N 1.94270°W		Mid to late 18th century	A hotel and shop in stone, with a stone slate roof, and gable coping and shaped kneelers to the right. There are three storeys and three bays. In the centre is a doorway with a moulded cornice, to its left is a square bay window, and the other windows are sashes in stone surrounds.	II
Langhorne House and Langhorne Cottage; 54.38941°N 1.94321°W		Mid to late 18th century	A pair of houses in stone that have a stone slate roof with gable coping and shaped kneelers. There are two storeys and six bays. On the front are two doorways, the left with a stone surround, and the right with pilasters, and a Doric doorcase with an entablature. The windows are sashes in stone surrounds.	II
Reeth Bridge; 54.38805°N 1.93792°W		1773	The bridge carries the B6270 road over Arkle Beck, and was design by John Carr. It is in stone, and consists of three segmental arches with V-shaped cutwaters rising to pedestrian refuges. The bridge has a band, and plain coped parapets with roundels and domed drums at the ends.	II
1, 2 and 3 Hillary Terrace, Reeth; 54.38818°N 1.94264°W		Late 18th century	A terrace of three stone houses, the left one in whitewashed pebbledash, with a stone slate roof, gable coping and shaped kneelers. There are three storeys and five bays. On the front are three doorways, the left in a chamfered stone surround with a depressed arch, and the others sharing a porch. The windows are sashes in architraves.	II
2 Silver Street, Reeth; 54.38963°N 1.94347°W		Late 18th century	The house is in stone, with quoins, and a stone slate roof with gable coping and shaped kneelers. There are three storeys and two bays. The central doorway has a stone surround and a divided fanlight, and the windows are sashes in stone surrounds.	II
8 Silver Street, Reeth; 54.38964°N 1.94415°W		Late 18th century	The house is in stone, and has a stone slate roof with gable coping and a shaped kneeler. There are three storeys, and the one-bay gable end faces the street. On the gable end is a doorway, and elsewhere there are sash windows and a tall landing window.	II
AD Cottage; 54.38583°N 1.93033°W	—	Late 18th century	The house is in fendered stone, and has a stone slate roof with gable coping. There are two storeys and one bay. The doorway on the right has a moulded surround, and the windows are sashes.	II
AD House; 54.38579°N 1.93022°W	—	Late 18th century	The house is in rendered sandstone, and has a stone slate roof with gable coping and shaped kneelers. There are two storeys and three bays, and an extension to the right. The doorway is in the centre, and the windows on the front are sashes in stone surrounds. At the rear is a moulded mullioned window, and a reused stair window with an arch and a keystone.	II
Draycott Hall; 54.38606°N 1.93091°W		Late 18th century	A country house converted into flats, it is in rendered stone with a Westmorland slate roof. The house consists of a main range of three storeys and five bays, and later flanking two-storey two-bay wings. In the centre is a semicircular Tuscan porch, with mutules and a cornice, and a doorway with reeded moulding, a fanlight and sidelights. On the top floor are fixed windows, and on the lower floors of the wings are paired Venetian windows. Elsewhere, the windows are sashes.	II*
Garden House, Draycott Hall; 54.38686°N 1.92950°W	—	Late 18th century	A folly in the grounds of the hall, it is in stone, and consists of a single room in the style of a medieval fortification, with a large later addition at the rear. On the front is a double door under an arch with a keystone, flanked by slit widows, above which is a band, a row of pigeon openings and an embattled parapet.	II
Garden wall, Draycott Hall; 54.38675°N 1.93049°W	—	Late 18th century	The wall encloses the garden on the east, north and west sides. It is in stone, between 3 metres (9.8 ft) and 5 metres (16 ft) in height, and is embattled. It incorporates a mock gateway with a stone arched opening flanked by two arched niches, each with a blind quatrefoil above, and surmounted by battlements.	II
Gate piers about 10 metres west of Draycott Hall; 54.38607°N 1.93125°W	—	Late 18th century	The gate piers are in stone and about 2.5 metres (8 ft 2 in) in height. They consist of rusticated blocks, alternately vermiculated. Each pier has a band and a domed finial.	II
Gate piers about 20 metres west of Draycott Hall; 54.38618°N 1.93148°W	—	Late 18th century	The gate piers are in stone, about 5 metres (16 ft) in height, and consist of rusticated blocks, alternately vermiculated. Each pier has a plain capital and a moulded cornice carrying a ball finial with a vermiculated central squared band.	II
Gate piers southeast of Draycott Hall; 54.38569°N 1.93051°W	—	Late 18th century	The gate piers are in stone, about 5 metres (16 ft) in height, and consist of rusticated blocks, alternately vermiculated. Each pier has a plain capital and a moulded cornice carrying a ball finial with a vermiculated central squared band.	II
Stable block, Draycott Hall; 54.38624°N 1.93132°W	—	Late 18th century	The stable block, later converted into flats, is in stone, with quoins, and a hipped Westmorland slate roof. There are two storeys and four bays. The middle two bays project under a pediment, and contain two arched doorways with keystones, above which are two oculi. Each outer bay contains a central round-headed window in a former doorway with a fanlight. Flanking the window, and on the upper floor, are sash windows in stone surrounds.	II
Fremington Mill; 54.38652°N 1.93479°W		Late 18th century	The former watermill is in stone with a Welsh slate roof. There are two storeys and three bays. On the ground floor are a stable door and a fixed window, and the upper floor contains a pitching door and two fixed windows.	II
Overton House; 54.38911°N 1.94318°W		Late 18th century	A shop in whitewashed stone, it has a stone slate roof with gable coping and shaped kneelers. There are three storeys and two bays. On the ground floor is a shopfront with fluted pilasters and a plain frieze. To its right is a depressed carriage arch with a keystone. The upper floors contain sash windows with banded stone surrounds.	II
Overton Lea; 54.38964°N 1.94401°W		Late 18th century	The house is in stone, and has a stone slate roof with gable coping and shaped kneelers. There are three storeys and two bays. The central doorway has a fanlight, and the windows are sashes with milled stone surrounds.	II
Spring Field; 54.38620°N 1.93204°W	—	Late 18th century	The house is in stone, with quoins, and a stone slate roof with gable coping and shaped kneelers. There are three storeys, a double depth plan, two bays, and a service wing on the left. The windows are sashes.	II
Sundale; 54.38865°N 1.94106°W		Late 18th century	The house is in stone, the main range rendered, and it has stone slate roofs with gable coping and shaped kneelers. The main range has three storeys and two bays, and the rear wing has two storeys and two bays. On the main range is a lean-to porch, the rear wing has a doorway with a stone surround, and the windows are sashes throughout.	II
Swaleview; 54.38651°N 1.97508°W	—	Late 18th century	The house is in stone, with quoins, and a stone slate roof with gable coping and shaped kneelers. There are two storeys and two bays, and a continuous rear outshut. The doorway has an architrave with a pulvinated frieze, and the windows are sashes in architraves.	II
The Gift Shop; 54.38918°N 1.94317°W		Late 18th century	The shop is in stone with a stone slate roof. There are three storeys and two bays. On the ground floor is a shopfront on the left, and a fixed display window. Above the shopfront is a canted bay window, and to its right and on the top floor are sash windows.	II
The Laurels; 54.38854°N 1.94098°W		Late 18th century	The house is in pebbledashed stone, and has a stone slate roof with gable coping and shaped kneelers. There are three storeys and three bays. In the centre is a doorcacse flanked by attached Tuscan columns with acanthus capitals and a plain entablature, and a doorway with a radial fanlight. This is flanked by canted bay windows, and the upper floors contain sash windows with stone surrounds.	II
Weighill's Garage; 54.38897°N 1.93816°W	—	c. 1800	A sawmill, later a garage, It is in stone with a stone slate roof, and has a single storey. In the centre a gabled wing with buttresses projects, and contains a doorway under a blocked depressed arch, over which is an oculus. To its left are two large fixed windows, to the right is a sliding door, and at both ends are carriage entrances.	II
Old Gang Peat Store; 54.40157°N 2.04354°W		Late 18th to early 19th century	The peat store is in limestone and is now a ruin. It is about 400 feet (120 m) in length, and has 39 bays. The remains consist of the tapering piers of the bay divisions, and the gable end walls.	II
Old Gang Smelt Mill; 54.40045°N 2.04070°W		Late 18th to early 19th century	The remains of a lead smelting mill, a flue and subsidiary buildings are in stone and now in ruins. The tall square chimney remains intact.	II
Surrender Peat Store; 54.39497°N 2.01511°W		Late 18th to early 19th century	The peat store is in stone and in ruins. The remaining parts consist of gable end walls, and one pair of the piers of the bay divisions. The store extends for 188 feet (57 m), and is 20 feet (6.1 m) in width.	II
Surrender Smelt Mill; 54.39467°N 2.01607°W		Late 18th to early 19th century	The lead smelting mill and flue are in stone and are in ruins. The remaining parts consist of gable end and side walls. There are five doorways, two blocked, and three window openings, one blocked.	II
Stable and storage range, Wood Yard Farm; 54.38842°N 1.93821°W		Late 18th to early 19th century	The building is in stone with a stone slate roof. There is a single storey, the left part is taller and has a loft. The left part contains three doors, one with a fanlight, and four windows, and above is a pitching door. In the right part are seven depressed segmental arches.	II
Bracken House; 54.38926°N 1.94318°W		Early 19th century	A former shop in stone, with large quoins, and a stone slate roof with gable coping and shaped kneelers. There are two storeys and four bays. To the left is a shop window and a doorway under a dentilled cornice. On its right is a doorway with a stone surround, and elsewhere are sash windows in stone surrounds.	II
Fellside, South View and Hillcrest; 54.38972°N 1.94194°W		Early 19th century	A terrace of three houses in stone, the middle house with a moulded cornice. The roof has gable coping, and is hipped on the right. There are two storeys, the left house has one bay, the middle house has three, and the right house has two bays. The windows in all the houses are sashes. The doorways have square pilasters, the outer houses also have an entablature, and the middle house has an open pediment.	II
The Haggs; 54.38491°N 1.91231°W		Early 19th century	The house is in rendered stone on a plinth, with a stone slate roof. There are two storeys, three bays, single-storey single-bay wings with eaves bands, and a rear outshut. On the centre is a pedimented porch and a decorative studded door with a roundel, and the windows are sashes with cambered heads.	II
Stableblock, The Haggs; 54.38504°N 1.91212°W		Early 19th century	The stable block is in stone with a stone slate roof. The coach house on the left has two storeys and one bay. It contains a segmental-arched doorway, with a flat-arched opening above and a lunette over that. To the right is a single-storey three-bay workshop, its roof hipped on the right. It contains a central doorway flanked by flat-arched openings.	II
The Old Mortuary; 54.38768°N 1.94138°W	—	1835	The former mortuary is in stone, with quoins, and a stone slate roof with gable coping and shaped kneelers. There is a single storey, on the north front is a doorway, and on the roof is a small wooden ventilator with lead roof.	II
Wesleyan Chapel; 54.38946°N 1.94121°W		1840	The chapel is in stone, with rusticated quoins, a sill band and a stone slate roof. There are two storeys and three bays, with the gable end facing the street. The central doorway has pilasters, a frieze and a moulded cornice. The windows are round-headed with keystones. The gable is shaped and moulded, and is flanked by ball finials.	II
Water Pump east of The King's Arms; 54.38896°N 1.94273°W		1868	The water pump and trough are in stone. The pump is cylindrical, about 2 metres (6 ft 7 in) high, with a tap in the centre, an inscribed plaque, a conical top and a finial. In front, there is a circular trough.	II
Water Pump southeast of the Burgoyne Hotel; 54.38951°N 1.94183°W		1868	The water pump and trough are in stone. The pump is cylindrical, about 2 metres (6 ft 7 in) high, with a tap in the centre, an inscribed plaque, a conical top and a finial. In front, there is a circular trough.	II
Congregational Church; 54.38813°N 1.94223°W		1868–70	The church is in stone with a steeply-pitched slate roof. It consists of a nave, a chancel and a parish room. The gabled end faces the street, and contains a doorway with a pointed arch and a moulded hood mould, flanked by windows with trefoil heads. Above it is a large four-light window, a clock face, and a bellcote.	II
