= Calver Hill =

Peak in the Yorkshire Dales, England

- Mount Calva; Mount Calvey (archaic)
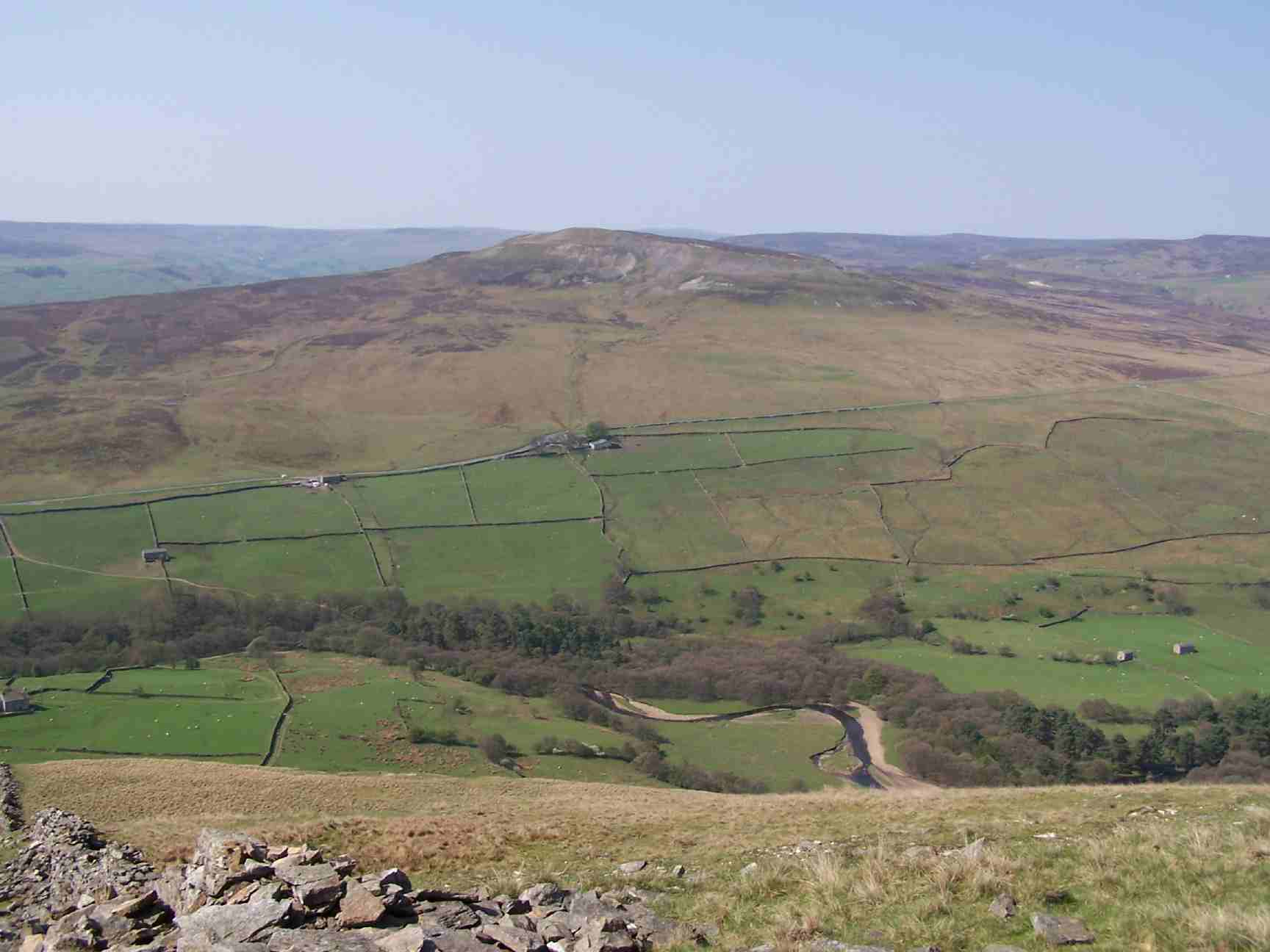
- Calver Hill seen from Fremington Edge

Highest point
- Elevation: 487 m (1,598 ft)
- Prominence: 90 m (300 ft)
- Coordinates: 54.397°N 1.980°W

Geography
- Location: Swaledale, North Yorkshire
- Country: England
- OS grid: NZ012003

Calver Hill is a fell in the Yorkshire Dales National Park in North Yorkshire, England. It is composed of limestone and is situated at grid reference NZ012003, near where the valleys of Swaledale and Arkengarthdale meet, the village of Reeth is located on its lower south-eastern slopes, it reaches an altitude of 487 metres (1,598 ft) and is a distinguished feature in mid Swaledale. Calver Hill is an area of grouse shooting and the fell is dotted with grouse butts. Most of the drainage from the fell goes north and easterly to join the Arkle Beck in lower Arkengarthdale which eventually joins the River Swale just south of Reeth.

== History ==
Evidence exits on the slopes of Calver Hill that point to use during the Neolithic Period and the Bronze Age. Finds of arrowheads, flints, and field patterns also point to possible areas of habitation. The whole area of Calver Hill is sometimes referred to as Reeth Low Moor, and in some older texts, the name of the hill is recorded as either Mount Calvey, or Calvey Hill. Another alternative name of Mount Calva persists into the modern day.

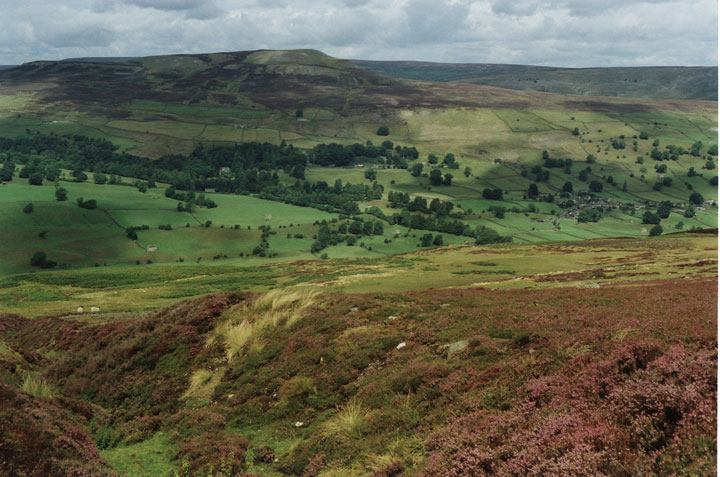
Calver seen from the south, across Swaledale, with Healaugh to the right of the picture and Fremington Edge beyond

Older versions of the 1:25,000 Ordnance Survey map show a trig point at the summit of Calver Hill but all there is now is a pile of rubble and mining spoil to form a summit cairn. The fell is littered with signs of Calver Hill’s industrial past; there is a large disused quarry 500 metres (1,600 ft) north-west of the summit cairn, there are also disused tips, pits and shafts from former lead mines. Lead mining reached its heyday in the 19th century in this area and they were some of the most productive mines in Yorkshire. Calver Hill was a Bole hill a place where the lead from the mines was smelted in an open air furnace which used the prevailing wind to increase the heat. Burnt stones and a scattering of slag show the locations of these furnaces.

In January 1868, the disposal of some nitro-glycerine on top of the hill caused some worry in nearby Reeth and Arkengarthdale as the local population were not informed of the impending explosion. The blast caused debris to extend over 200 yards (180 m) out from the centre, and local people thought they were under attack.

== Walks ==
Calver Hill can be climbed from Reeth, Langthwaite, and Arkle Town in Arkengarthdale, and from Healaugh in Swaledale. From Arkengarthdale, the Arkle Town to Healaugh bridleway can be used to attain the western ridge at a height of 420 metres (1,380 ft).
