= David Bradbury =

David Bradbury may refer to:

- David Bradbury (film maker), Australian film maker
- David Bradbury (rugby league) (born 1972), Irish rugby league player
- David Bradbury (politician) (born 1976), Australian politician

== See also ==
- David Bradberry (1736–1803), also spelt Bradbury, English nonconformist minister
