= Surrender Mill =

Smeltmill in Reeth, North Yorkshire, England

Coordinates: 54.394°N 2.016°W

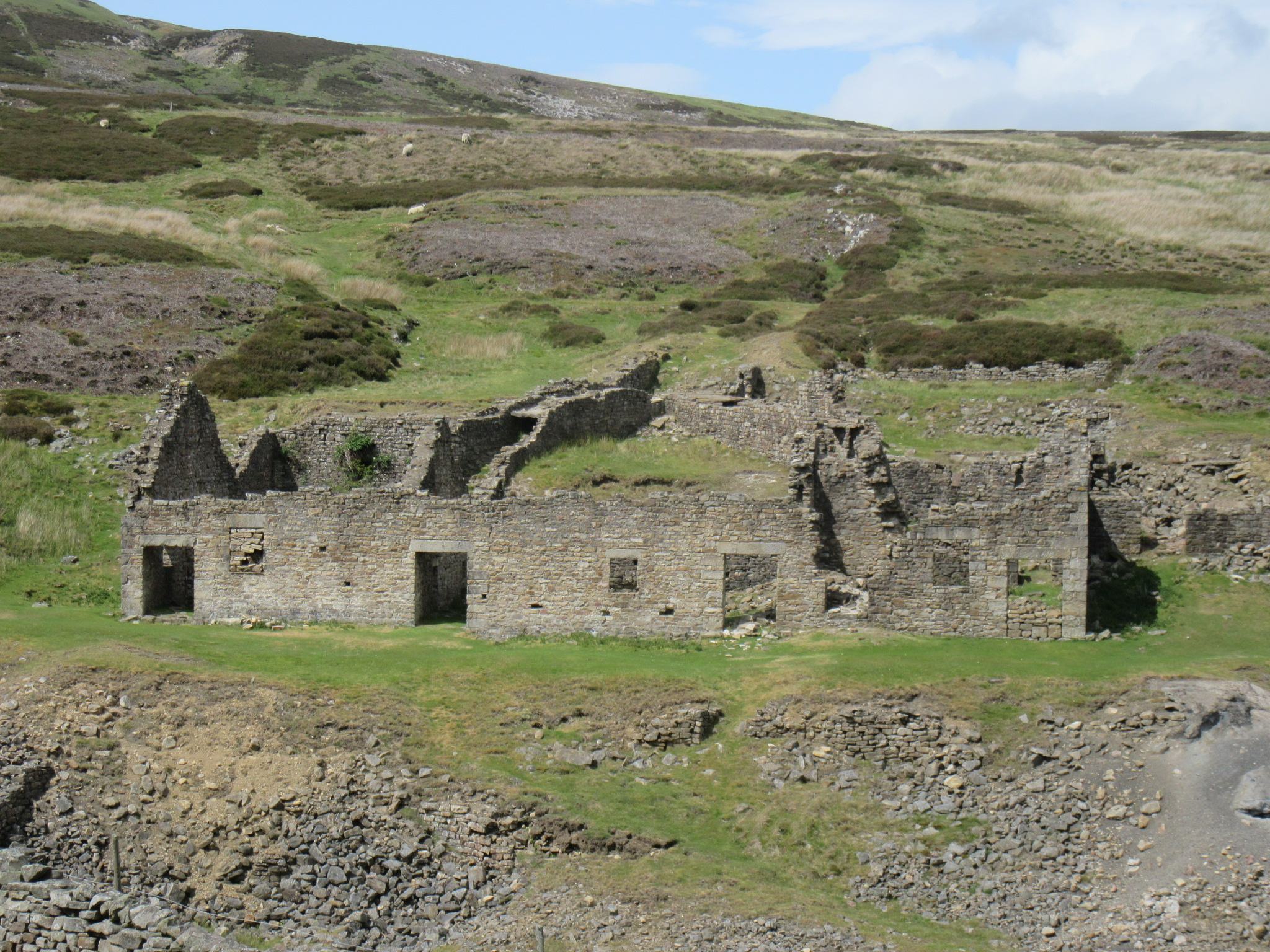
The mill, in 2025

Surrender Mill is a ruined building near Reeth, a village in North Yorkshire, in England.

Two watermills known as the Low Mills were constructed before 1720, to smelt lead. In 1841, the Surrender Company replaced both mills with a new structure. In 1854, the flue was extended to vent through a chimney 2,444 feet (745 m) away. The mill closed in 1880, and ore from the mine workings was thereafter taken to Old Gang Mill. The mill was maintained until 1902, when the roofs, doors and floorboards were sold. In 1909, the 14 feet (4.3 m)-diameter waterwheel was also sold. The ruined building was grade II listed in 1973, and the nearby peat store is separately listed. The site is also a scheduled monument.

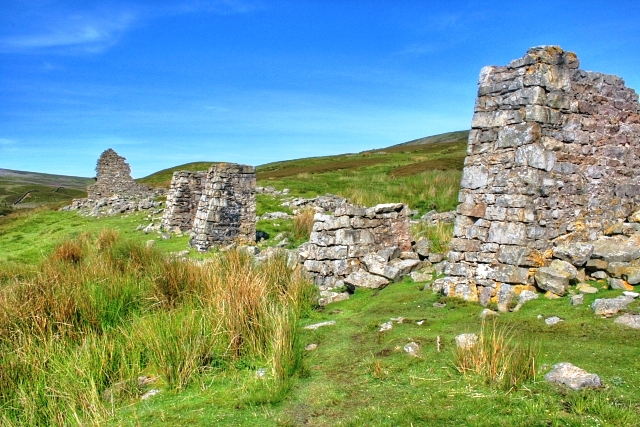
Remains of the peat store

The remaining parts of the mill are the gable end and side walls. There are five doorways, two blocked, and three window openings, one blocked. The peat store is built of stone and is also in ruins. The remaining parts consist of gable end walls, and one pair of the piers of the bay divisions. The store extends for 188 feet (57 m), and is 20 feet (6.1 m) in width.

== See also ==
- Listed buildings in Reeth, Fremington and Healaugh
