= Draycott Hall =

Historic country home in North Yorkshire

Coordinates: 54°23′10″N 1°55′51″W

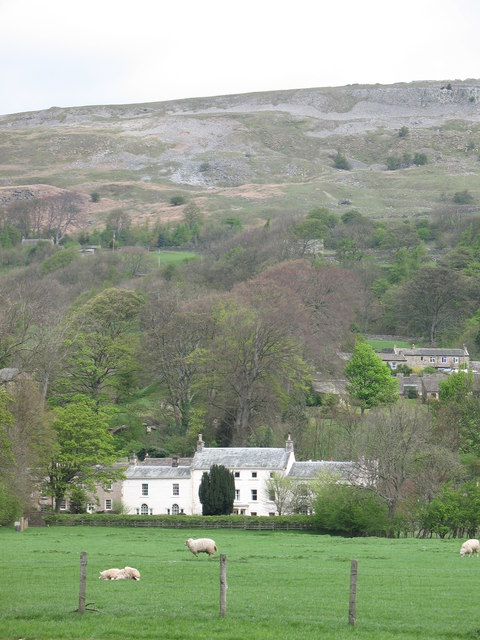
The building, in 2007

Draycott Hall is a historic building in Fremington, North Yorkshire, a hamlet in England.

The oldest part of the country house is the rear wing, which was built in 1730. The front part of the house was built in the late 18th century, with the rear section becoming a service wing. The house was originally known as Low Fremington Hall, and was occupied by the Denys baronets. The house was grade II* listed in 1966, and the rear wing was separately grade II listed in 1986. The house has been converted into flats.

The house is built of rendered stone with a Westmorland slate roof. It consists of a main range of three storeys and five bays, and later flanking two-storey two-bay wings. In the centre is a semicircular Tuscan porch, with mutules and a cornice, and a doorway with reeded moulding, a fanlight and sidelights. On the top floor are fixed windows, and on the lower floors of the wings are paired Venetian windows. Elsewhere, the windows are sashes. The service wing is built of stone, with a band and a blind parapet. It has two storeys and seven bays. On its front are doorways and an initialled datestone. There is one fixed window, and the others are sashes in stone surrounds.

== See also ==
- Grade II* listed buildings in North Yorkshire (district)
- Listed buildings in Reeth, Fremington and Healaugh
