= The Burgoyne Hotel =

Hotel in Reeth, North Yorkshire, England

Coordinates: 54°23′23″N 1°56′32″W

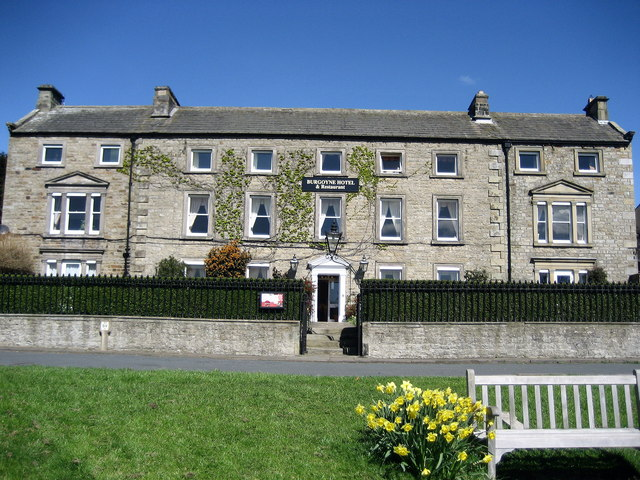
The building, in 2007

The Burgoyne Hotel is a historic building in Reeth, a village in North Yorkshire, in England.

The hotel was built in 1783 as "Hill House". It was extended in 1870, and again in 1923. After World War II, it was converted into a hotel. The building and its railings were grade II listed in 1966. In 2016 it was purchased by Ian Hewitt, who refurbished the 11-bedroom hotel and hired almost its entire staff from the village. In 2023, it was sold to the Maison Parfaite hotel group.

The hotel is built of stone, with rusticated quoins, and a stone slate roof with shaped kneelers and gable coping. There are three storeys, a central block of five bays, and later recessed one-bay wings. The central doorway has pilasters, a plain frieze and a pediment. On the top floor are fixed windows in moulded surrounds, and elsewhere the windows are sashes, those in the main block in moulded architraves. In each wing, on the ground floor is a French window flanked by sashes with pilasters and an entablature, and on the middle floor the windows are tripartite with pilasters, an entablature and a pediment. At the front is a low wall, and cast iron railings and gates with fleur-de-lys finials.

== See also ==
- Listed buildings in Reeth, Fremington and Healaugh
