= Old Gang Mill =

Mill building in Reeth, North Yorkshire, England

Coordinates: 54.4002°N 2.0409°W

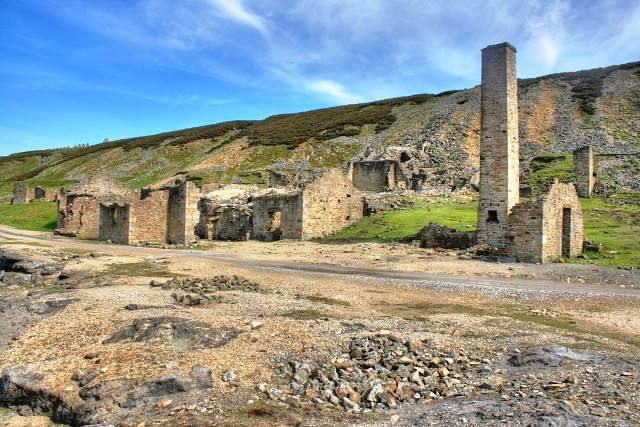
The mill, in 2008

Old Gang Mill is a ruined building near Reeth, a village in North Yorkshire, in England.

The smeltmill was probably built in 1846, to replace the nearby New Mill. It smelted lead from nearby mines, but by 1885, the price of lead had fallen, and the mill reduced its activity. It stopped working some time between 1899 and 1903, local lead thereafter being smelted at Castleside Mill in County Durham. The mill fell into ruin, and the site was used for processing waste tips. The mill building, with its flue and some associated buildings, was grade II listed in 1969, and the peat store is separately grade II listed. The entire site, including the remains of New Mill, the mine workings, a miners' hut and a bridge, form a scheduled monument.

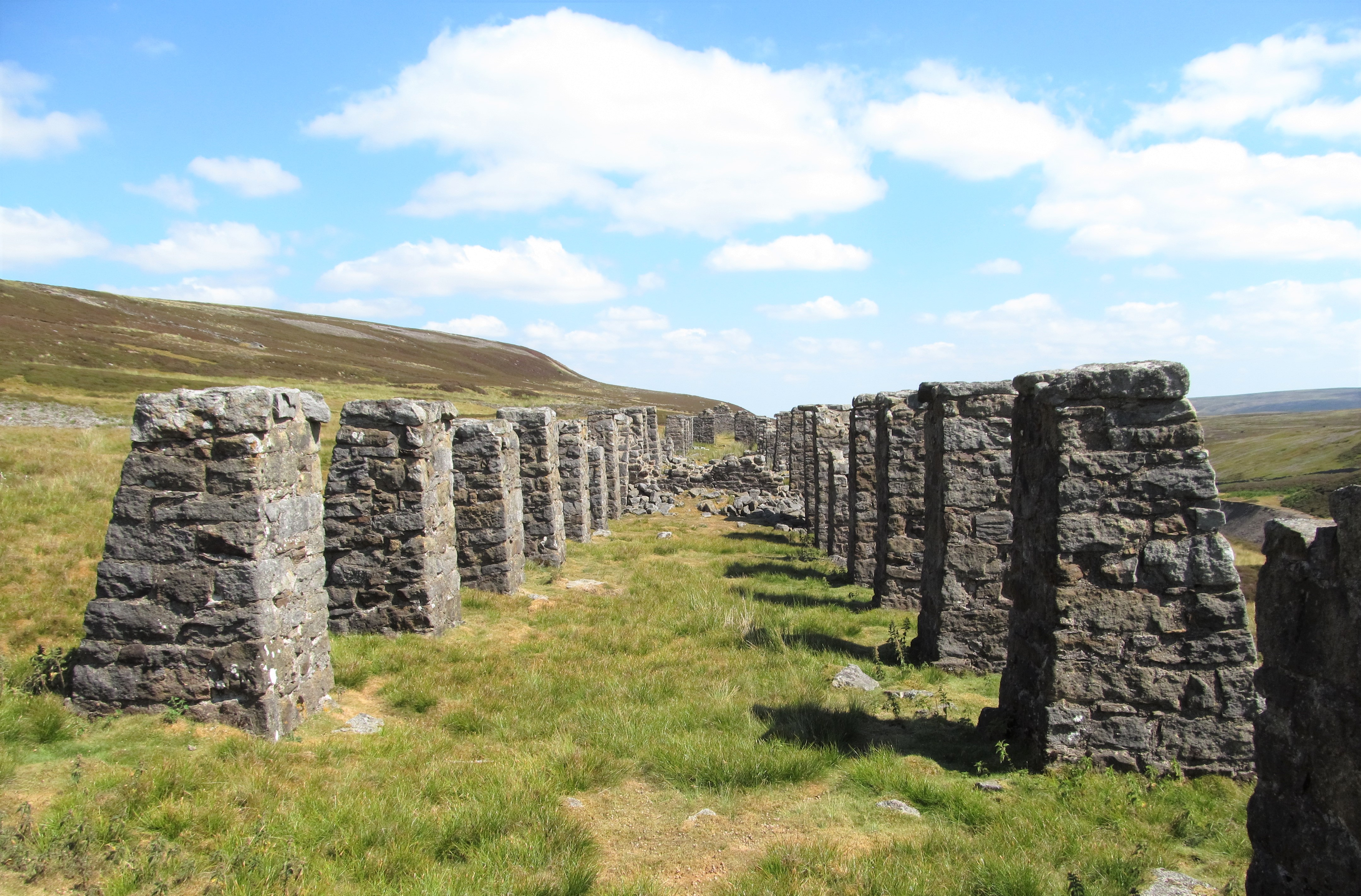
The peat store

The main building of the mill measures 24 metres by 10 metres and has a wheelhouse, a slag hearth and three ore hearths, while outbuildings include a roasting hearth and a silver hearth. Although the buildings are in ruins, in places they survive to roof height. The tall square chimney remains intact. The peat store is built of limestone and is also a ruin. It is about 400 feet (120 m) in length, and has 39 bays. The remains consist of the tapering piers of the bay divisions, and the gable end walls.

== See also ==
- Listed buildings in Reeth, Fremington and Healaugh
