= Fremington Mill =

Mill in Fremington, North Yorkshire, England

Coordinates: 54°23′11″N 1°56′05″W

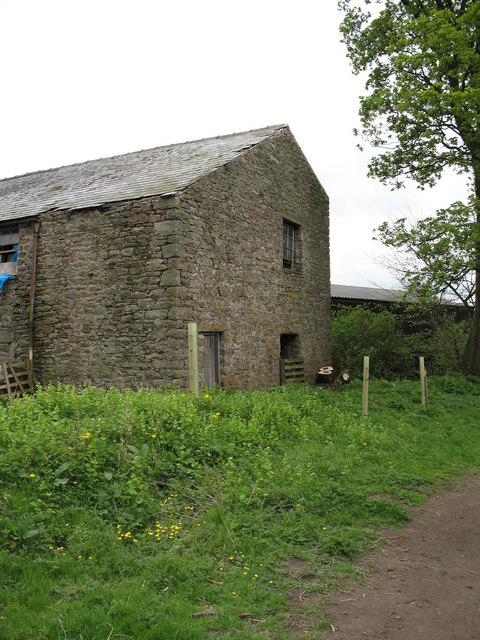
The building, in 2007

Fremington Mill is a historic watermill in Fremington, North Yorkshire, a hamlet in England.

A corn mill on the Arkle Beck in Fremington was first recorded in 1288. The current building was built shortly before 1751, and comprised a mill, kiln and miller's house. Around 1900, the waterwheel was enclosed, but the mill closed soon afterwards, and the building was then used as a barn. The building was grade II listed in 1986.

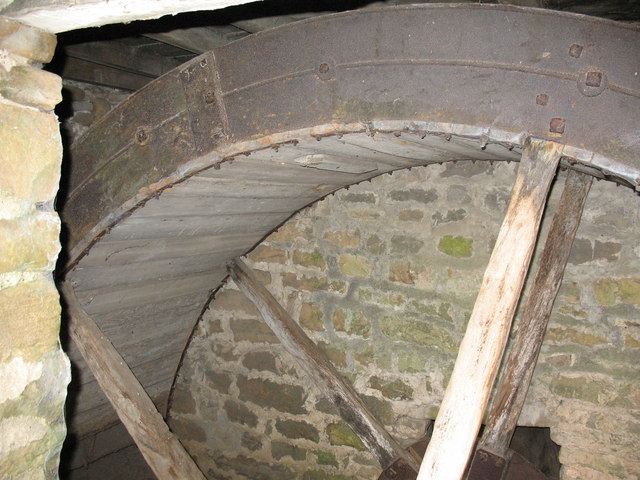
The waterwheel

The mill is built of stone with a Welsh slate roof. There are two storeys and three bays. On the ground floor are a stable door and a fixed window, and the upper floor contains a pitching door and two fixed windows. Inside, much of the mill machinery survives, including the crown wheel, gearing and hoist. The breastshot waterwheel is entirely made of timber, and is about 5 metres in diameter.

== See also ==
- Listed buildings in Reeth, Fremington and Healaugh
