= Reeth Methodist Church =

Chapel in Reeth, North Yorkshire, England

Coordinates: 54°23′22″N 1°56′28″W

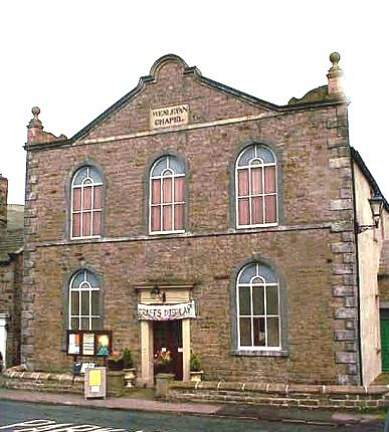
The church, in 2004

Reeth Methodist Church is a closed chapel in Reeth, a village in North Yorkshire, in England.

John Wesley preached in Low Row in the 1760s, and by 1768, there was a society in nearby Reeth with more than 30 members. Worship was held in a variety of rooms until 1797, when a purpose-built chapel was erected, as part of the Wesleyan Methodist Church. John Rawson, founder of several chapels, settled in Reeth in 1822, and in 1840 he arranged for the chapel to be rebuilt. The building was grade II listed in 1966. In the early 21st century, it was the venue for talks on a variety of subjects, marketed as the "Reeth Lectures". The congregational dwindled, and in 2016 the church was closed.

The chapel is built of stone, with rusticated quoins, a sill band and a stone slate roof. It has two storeys and three bays, with the gable end facing the street. The central doorway has pilasters, a frieze and a moulded cornice. The windows are round-headed with keystones. The gable is shaped and moulded, and is flanked by ball finials. Inside, there is a semicircular gallery.

== See also ==
- Listed buildings in Reeth, Fremington and Healaugh
