= Reeth, Fremington and Healaugh =

Civil parish in North Yorkshire, England

Coordinates: 54.390°N 1.943°W

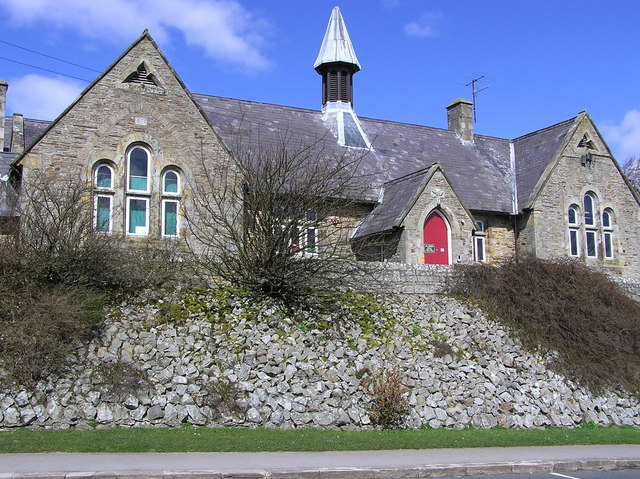
- Reeth Primary School

- Location within North Yorkshire
- Population: 724 (2011 census)
- Civil parish: Reeth, Fremington and Healaugh
- Unitary authority: North Yorkshire
- Ceremonial county: North Yorkshire
- Region: Yorkshire and the Humber
- Country: England
- Sovereign state: United Kingdom

Reeth, Fremington and Healaugh is a civil parish in North Yorkshire, England. It consists of the three villages of Reeth, Fremington and Healaugh.

As of the 2001 census, it had a population of 685, rising to 724 at the 2011 Census.

== Governance ==
The civil parish is part of the electoral ward of Reeth and Arkengarthdale. This ward has a total population taken at the 2011 Census of 1,230. From 1974 to 2023 it was part of the district of Richmondshire. It is now administered by the unitary North Yorkshire Council and the area's own parish council, which meets monthly.

== See also ==
- Listed buildings in Reeth, Fremington and Healaugh
