= Fremington Edge =

Escarpment in Swaledale, North Yorkshire, England

Coordinates: 54.40572°N 1.94565°W

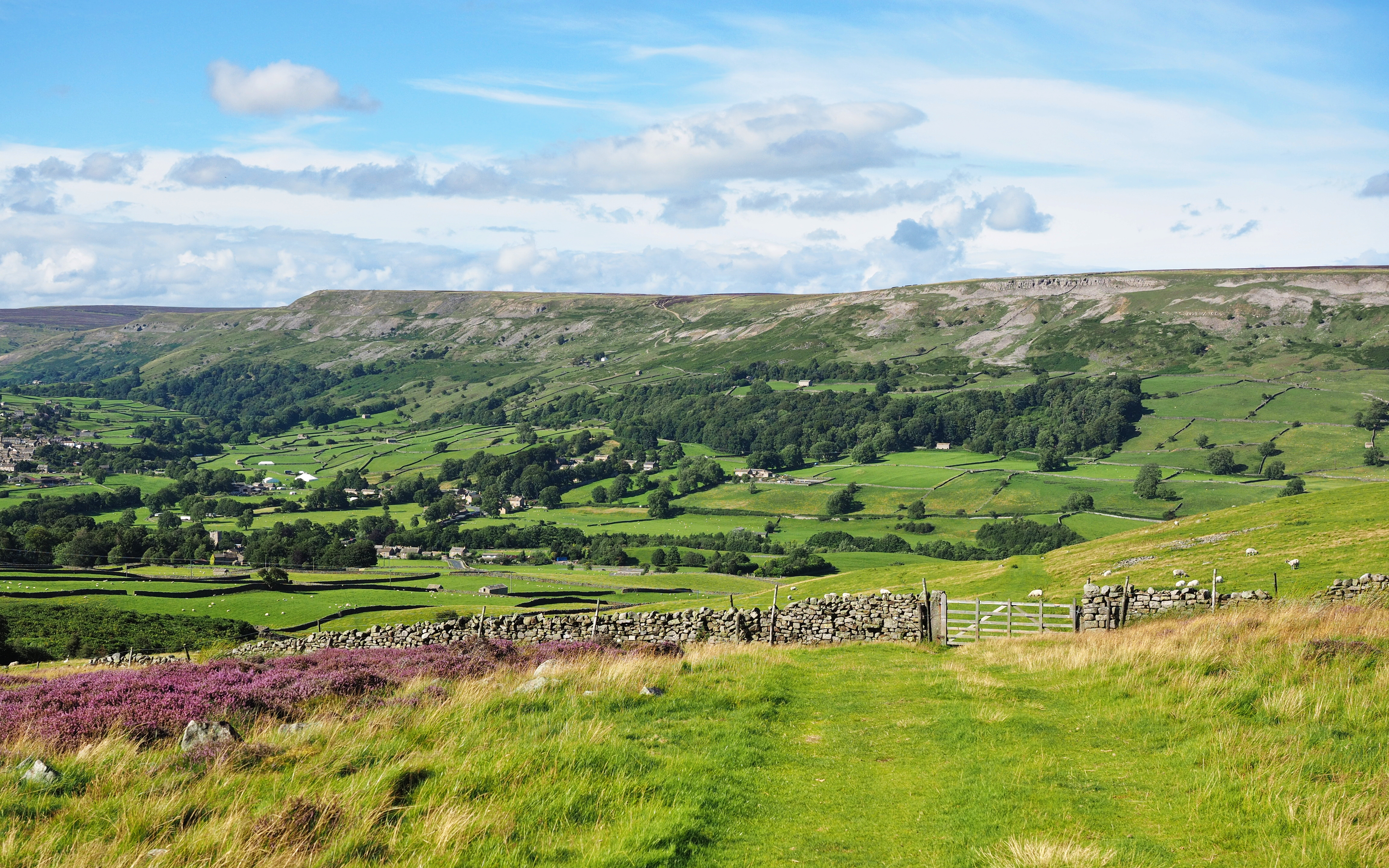
Fremington Edge as seen from Cogden Moor

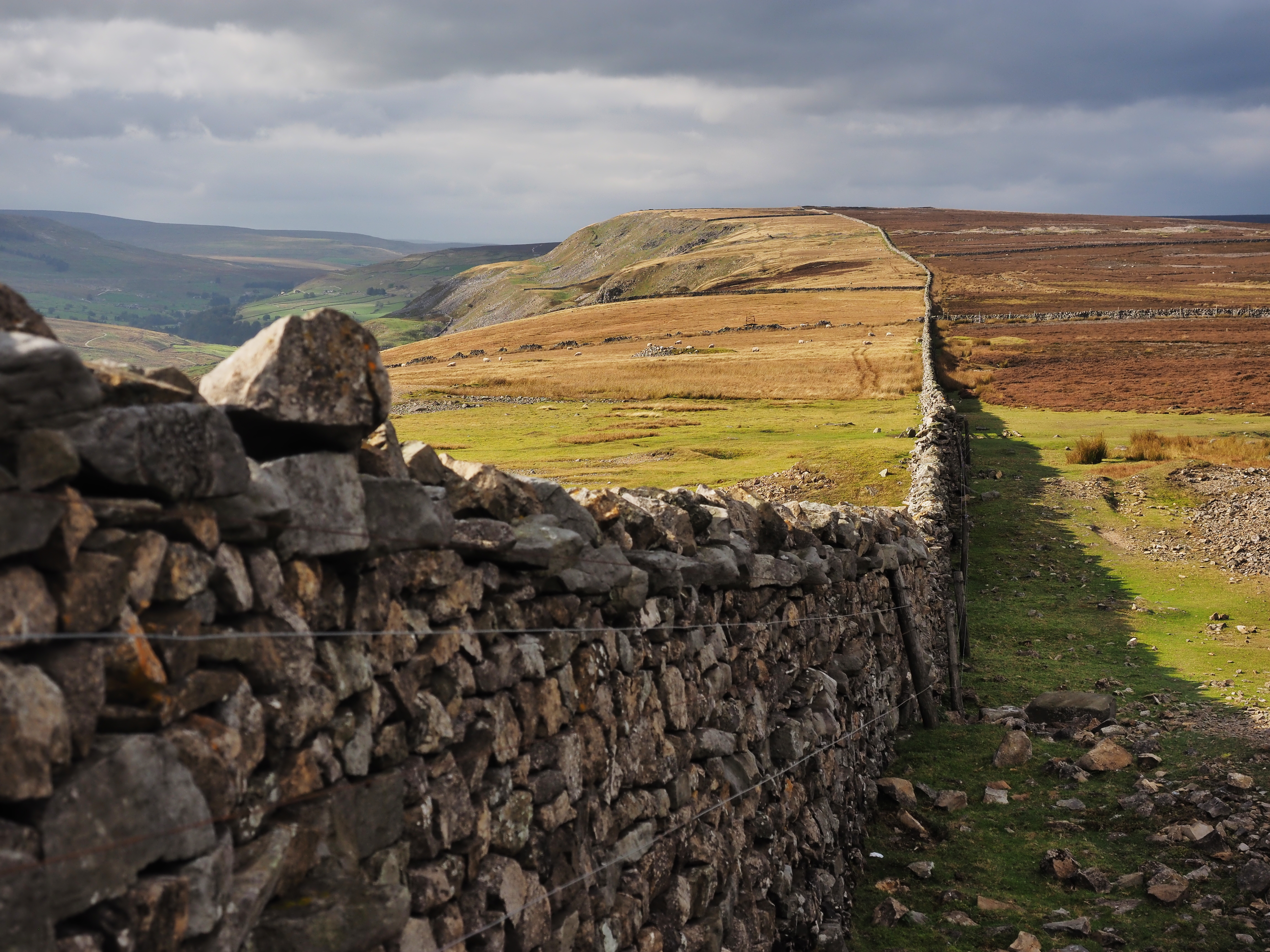
View from the eastern summit of Fremington Edge to the north-west into Arkengarthdale

Fremington Edge is a 3-mile (5 km) long wall of crags and scree slopes that is situated to the north of the village of Reeth in Swaledale in the Yorkshire Dales National Park, England. Fremington Edge forms the south-eastern edge of Arkengarthdale, extending to the point where the dale meets Swaledale. Throughout its full length the Edge stays above the height of 1,300 feet (400 m) and reaches a highest point of 1,552 feet (473 m) at the northern end of the escarpment.

== History ==
Fremington Edge was formed after the last Ice age when melt water from the retreating glaciers caused a landslip and exposed the rocky outcrops. Evidence of an Iron Age fort on the escarpment, and a settlement pre-date the 8th century arrival of the Anglo-Saxons. The Edge is scattered with remains of old lead and chert mines, and there are many disused shafts and spoil heaps. The chert was taken by lorry to Staffordshire for use in producing china and porcelain. A footpath and a solid dry stone wall stretch the entire length of the Edge with the heather clad Marrick Moor extending away to the east. Midway along are the remains of a disused radio mast

The Edge can be climbed either from Reeth, Langthwaite or Fremington. The ascent from Langthwaite goes by an old lane past the hamlet of Booze and the old farmhouse of Storthwaite Hall before winding steeply up through the disused workings of the Fell End Lead Mine to reach the highest point. The climb from Fremington utilises the well graded old road (now just a stony track) to Hurst, which passes the whitewashed farmhouse of the White House, a well seen landmark from Reeth. The climb from the popular tourist village of Reeth is quite hard going: a path goes directly up the steep escarpment from Arkle Beck to reach the Edge.

The view from the summit cairn at the northern end of the Edge gives an excellent view of Arkengarthdale, with Calver Hill also well seen. The southern end of the Edge gives an impressive aerial view of the village of Reeth.
