= The King's Arms Hotel, Reeth =

Hotel in Reeth, North Yorkshire, England

Coordinates: 54°23′20″N 1°56′36″W

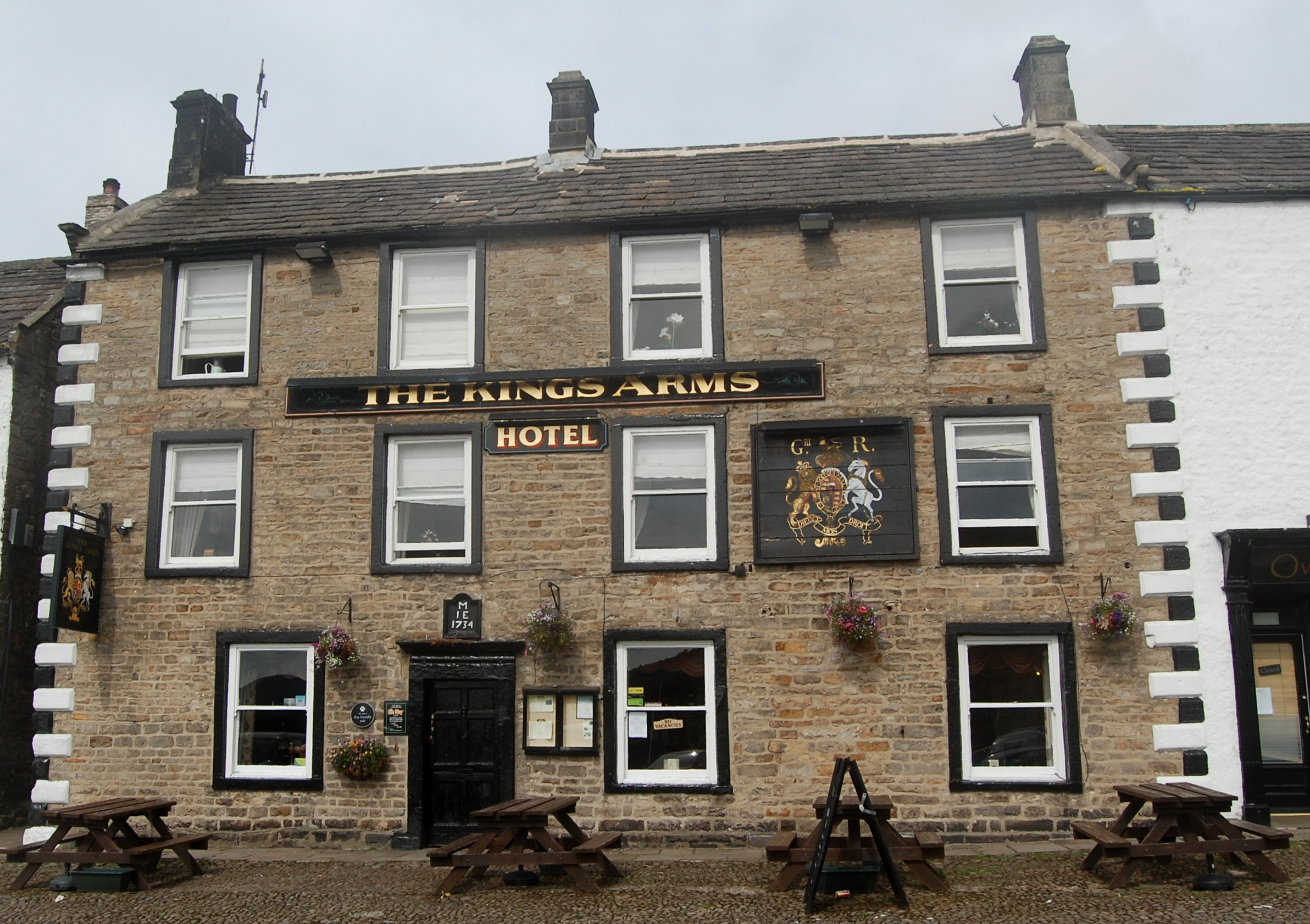
The pub, in 2015

The King's Arms Hotel is a historic building in Reeth, a village in North Yorkshire, in England.

The hotel was built in 1734, and has also been known as the "Middle House". The building was grade II listed in 1966. In 2025, it was refurbished by Star Pubs at a cost of £200,000. In addition to the bar, it has ten bedrooms.

The hotel is in stone, with rusticated quoins, and an M-shaped stone slate roof with gable coping and shaped kneelers. There are three storeys, a double depth plan, and two parallel ranges of four bays. The doorway has a stone surround, a pulvinated frieze, and a moulded cornice, above which is an initialled datestone. The windows are sashes in stone surrounds. Inside, it has a historic staircase, fireplace, and timber beams.

== See also ==
- Listed buildings in Reeth, Fremington and Healaugh
