= Reeth Evangelical Congregational Church =

Historic church in North Yorkshire

Coordinates: 54°23′17″N 1°56′32″W

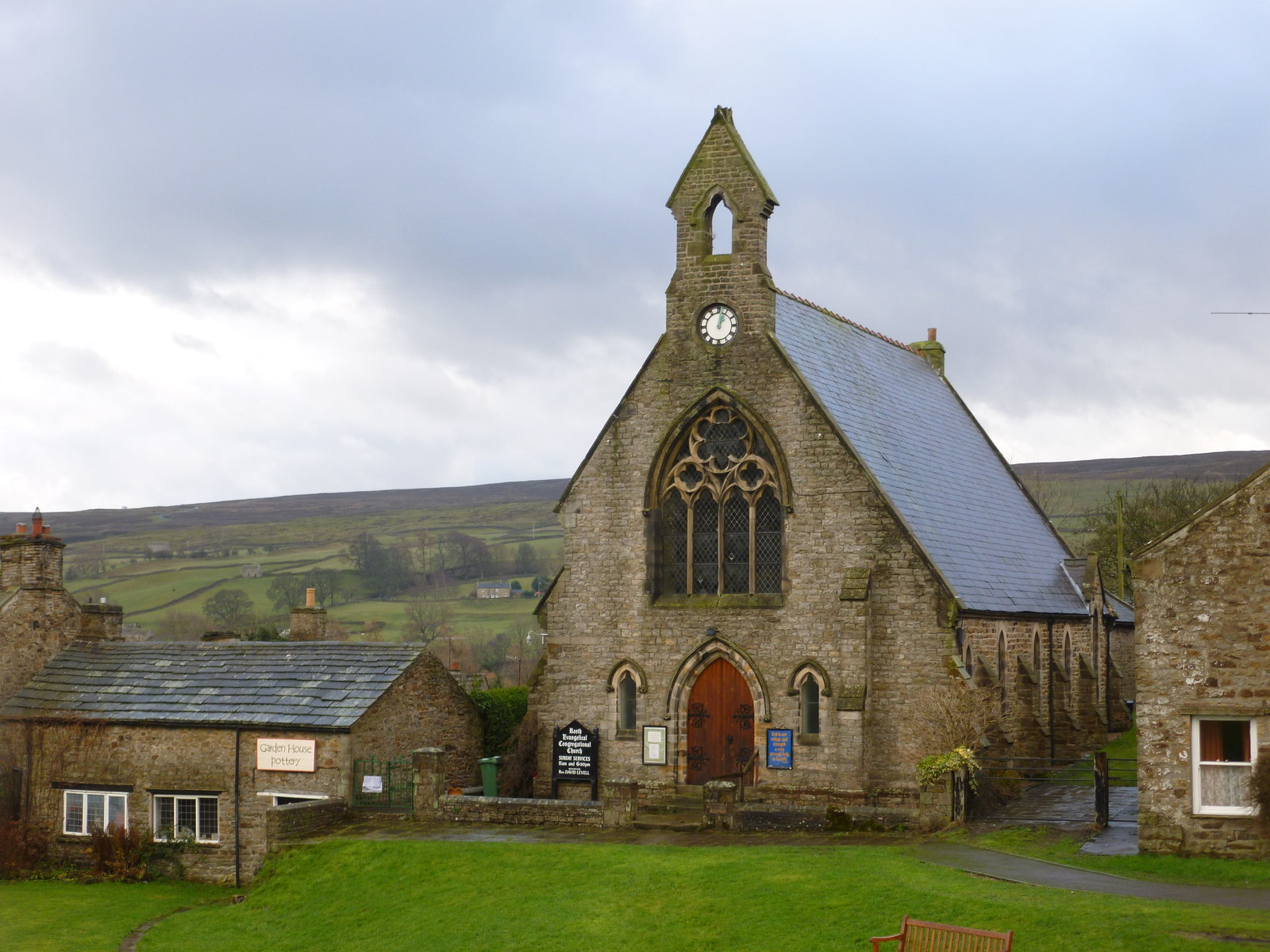
The church, in 2014

Reeth Evangelical Congregational Church is a historic building in Reeth, a village in North Yorkshire, in England.

The first Congregational church in Reeth was built around 1783, on the initiative of David Bradberry, a minister from Manchester. In 1866 a new building was constructed, to a design by James Pigott Pritchett Jr, at a cost of £831. The church joined the Congregational Union of England and Wales, but did not take part in the subsequent formation of the United Reformed Church, instead joining the new Evangelical Fellowship of Congregational Churches. By 1986, the church had only nine mostly elderly members, but the congregation subsequently grew under the ministry of Rev George Hemming . The building was grade II listed in 1986.

The church is built of stone with a steeply-pitched slate roof. It consists of a nave, a chancel and a parish room. The gabled end faces the street, and contains a doorway with a pointed arch and a moulded hood mould, flanked by windows with trefoil heads. Above it is a large four-light window, a clock face, and a bellcote.

== See also ==
- Listed buildings in Reeth, Fremington and Healaugh
