= Barney Beck =

Watercourse in North Yorkshire, England

- Barney Beck

- Location within North Yorkshire

Location
- Country: England
- County: North Yorkshire

Physical characteristics
- Source
  - coordinates: 54.3941°N 2.0079°W
  - elevation: 310 metres (1,020 ft)
- Mouth
  - coordinates: 54.3816°N 1.9772°W
  - elevation: 190 metres (620 ft)
- Length: 6.170 kilometres (3.834 mi)
- Basin size: 5.6 square kilometres (2.2 sq mi)

Basin features
- River system: River Swale
- EA waterbody ID: GB104027069080

Barney Beck is a tributary of the River Swale in North Yorkshire, England. The beck flows through moorland in Upper Swaledale and is known to be one of several streams in North Yorkshire that feed pollution into the River Swale, a legacy of the mining that took place in that area for lead and other metals. Efforts are being made to remediate the earth around the beck to prevent metals leaching out into the watercourse.

== History ==
Old mineworkings line the sides of the beck, and the Surrender Mill lead-working plant was located just upstream of where Bleaberry Gill joins the watercourse. An estimated 550,000 tonnes (610,000 tons) of lead was mined in the area, which was dominated by the Old Gang mines clustered around Barney Beck. Also in this area is the Surrender Bridge, a single-arch grade II listed structure which crosses Barney Beck. Bleaberry Gill is noted for having a ford on it which became well-known to viewers of the BBC series All Creatures Great and Small, as an old black car splashes through the ford on the opening credits.

During the 18th century, the beck was known as Bernopbeck, or Bernolfbeck. Whitaker suggests that the name has Saxon origins, possibly meaning child's, or infant beck, but he also states it could possibly be from the personal name of Beorn. It is recorded as far back as 1383, when it was mentioned as a boundary between common land for grazing cattle. Whilst mapping and other sources contend that the watercourse is called Barney Beck only after it meets Bleaberry Gill, the Environment Agency consider the two streams as one watercourse with a length of 12.4 kilometres (7.7 mi) and a catchment area of 1,628 hectares (4,020 acres). The length of Barney Beck on its own from the confluence of Old Gang Beck and Bleaberry Gill is 6.17 kilometres (3.83 mi) and a catchment area of 5.6 square kilometres (2.2 sq mi).

Two road bridges cross the watercourse before it enters into the River Swale; the B6270 crosses the beck not far from where it enters the Swale over Barney Beck Low Bridge, whereas Barney Beck High Bridge is further upstream and is a grade II listed structure. The upper part of the beck around Surrender Bridge, is shadowed by the Coast to Coast path, which is now a national trail.

== Pollution ==
Barney Beck is known to be polluted with fluorite, lead, zinc, and cadmium. Sampling taken from the River Swale, and its tributaries in the Reeth area, shows that the stretch of water downstream of Barney Beck displays the highest levels of pollutants along the river, with contaminants of lead, cadmium and zinc. In a programme undertaken by the Yorkshire Dales Rivers Trust, a mix of bacteria, algae, lichens, and mosses have been introduced which enable plant growth on bare soil and the plants will absorb heavy metals at the surface and stop them being washed into the beck.

Other tributaries of the Swale which are also polluting the river with metals are Gunnerside Beck, Arkle Beck and Marske Beck.
