= Fremington Hagg Hoard =

Roman hoard from North Yorkshire, England

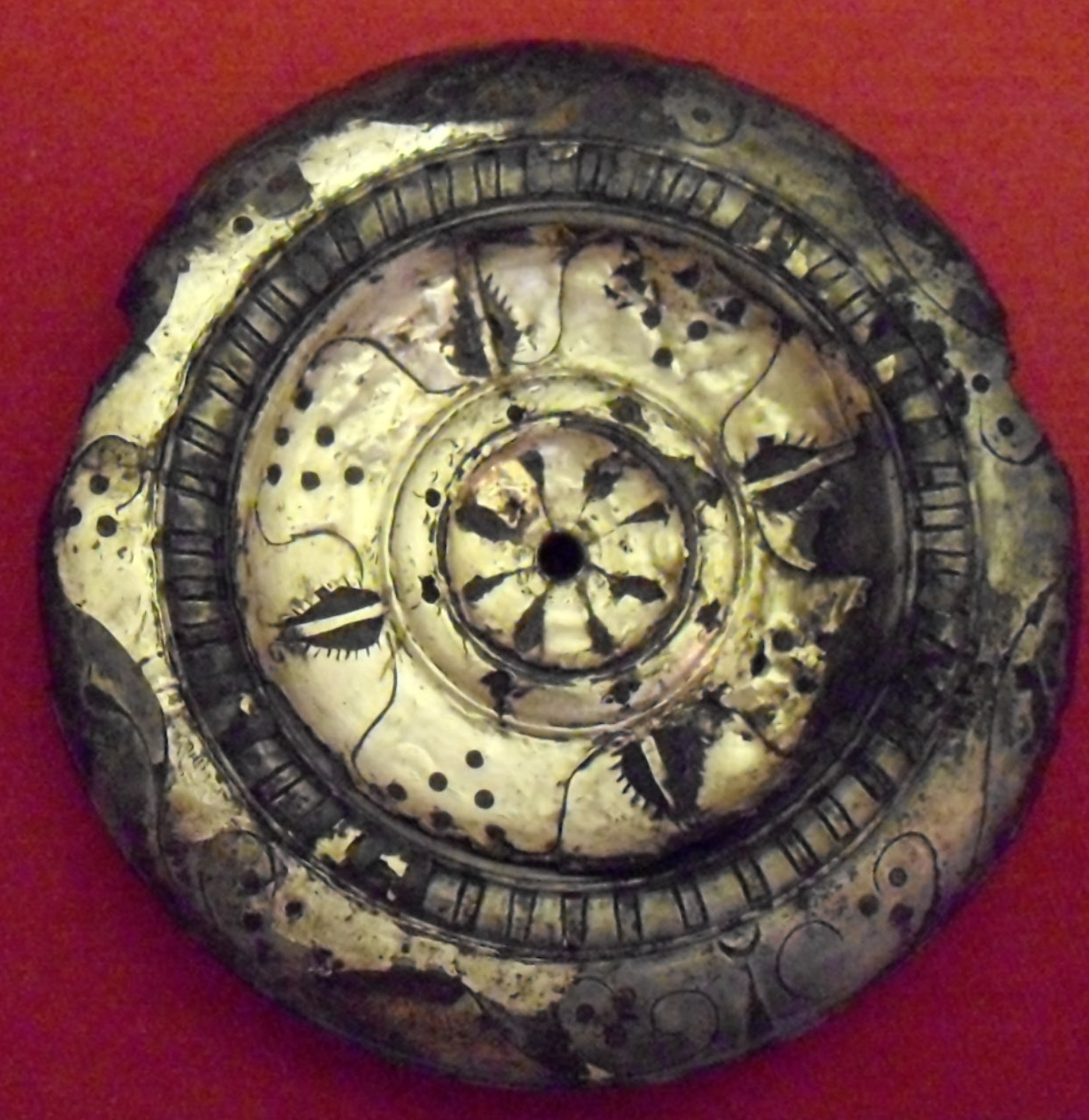
- One of the silvered harness mounts from the hoard
- Material: Roman horse harness equipment and fittings
- Created: late 1st century AD
- Period/culture: Romano-British
- Discovered: before 1833; Fremington Hagg, near Reeth, North Yorkshire, England
- Present location: British Museum, London; Yorkshire Museum, York

The Fremington Hagg Hoard is a hoard of Roman horse harness fittings found in Fremington Hagg, near Reeth, North Yorkshire in the early 19th Century. Parts of it are in the collections of the British Museum and the Yorkshire Museum.

== Discovery ==
The hoard was discovered before 1833, when the first objects were donated to the Yorkshire Museum. Other items were donated to the Museum by Captain Harland in 1852. In 1880 A. W. Franks donated a portion of the hoard to the British Museum.

== Contents ==
There are seven pieces in the British Museum and 68 pieces in the Yorkshire Museum which, together, probably constituted the original hoard. These are all harness fittings (horse gear) - decorative elements used on reigns and other straps. A further 28 objects in the Yorkshire Museum are associated with the hoard, but were considered by Graham Webster as not belonging to it - these include a scabbard mount, a chape, terret rings, studs, and other mounts.

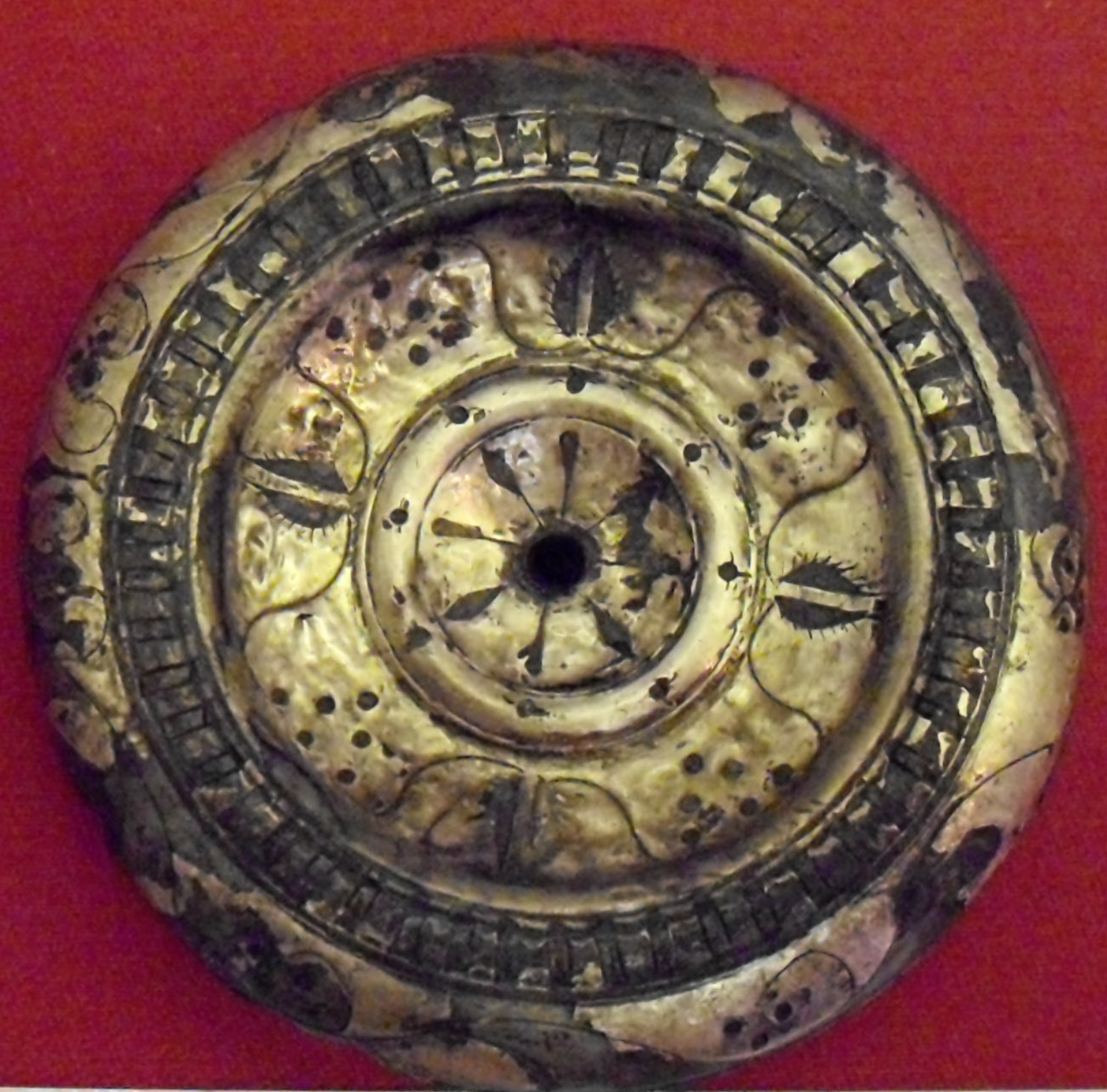

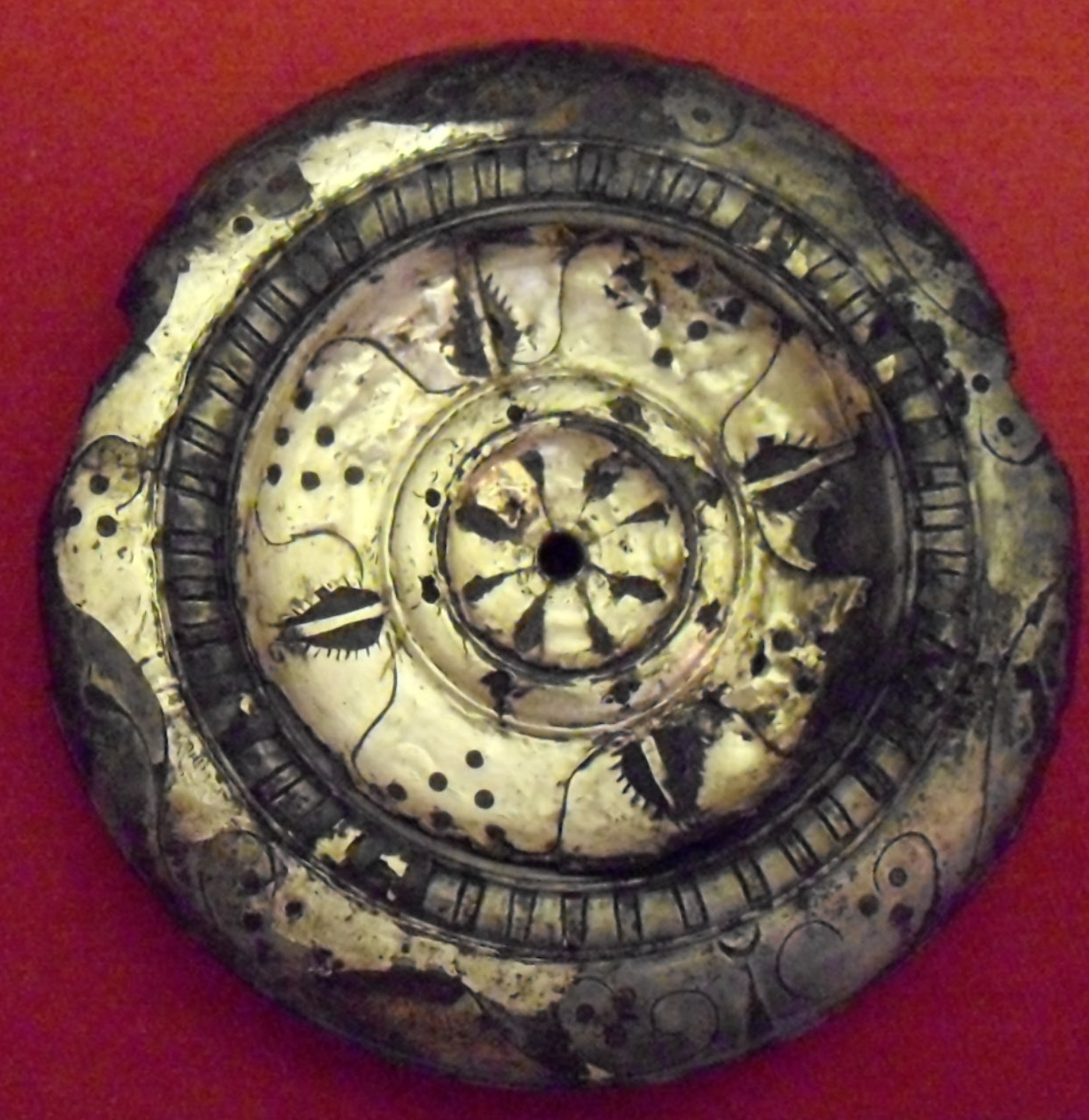

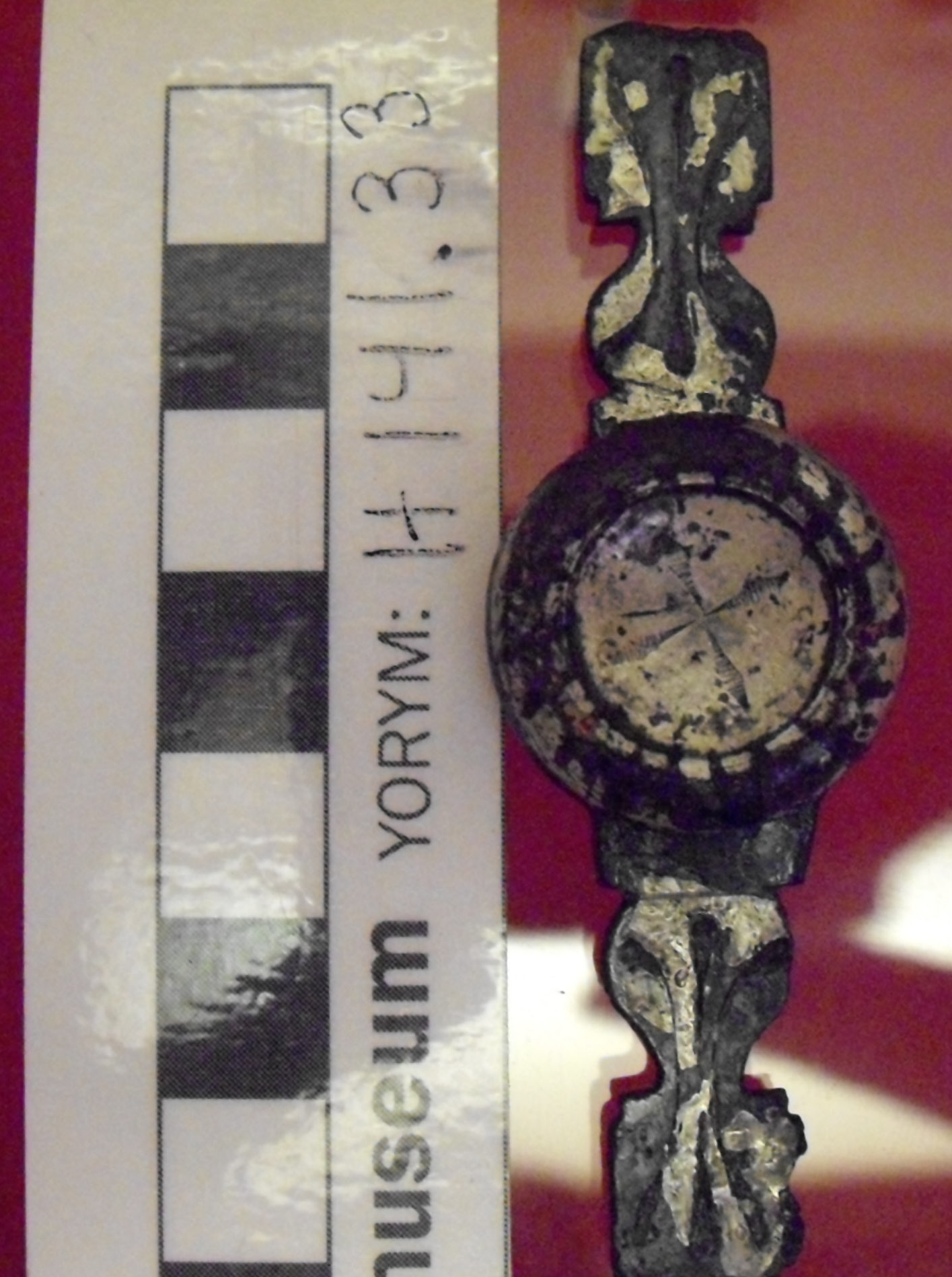

The hoard may represent a stolen or looted collection of Roman military fittings from the invasion period or an itinerant metalworker's stock hoard.

== Public display ==
The hoard was on display in the Yorkshire Museum by 1881.
