= Black Bull Hotel =

Pub in Reeth, North Yorkshire, England

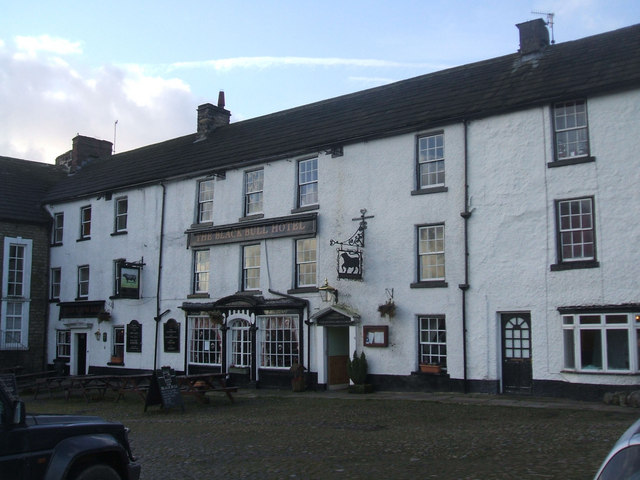
The pub, in 2008

The Black Bull Hotel is a historic pub in Reeth, a village in North Yorkshire, in England.

The building was constructed in the mid 18th century, as a pair of houses. The shop front in the left-hand house was added later in the century. The building was grade II listed in 1952. One of its later landlords removed the render from the facade, but was instructed by the North Yorkshire Moors National Park Authority to replace it; in protest, he turned the pub sign upside down, a tradition which has been maintained.

The pub is built of whitewashed stone with a stone slate roof. It has three storeys and seven bays. On the ground floor, towards the left, is a doorway with a plain surround and a moulded cornice. To the right is a double-bowed shopfront containing a central window with Tuscan pilasters and a segmental pediment, and to its right is a doorway with plain surround and a moulded open pediment. The other windows are sashes.

== See also ==
- Listed buildings in Reeth, Fremington and Healaugh
