= Fremington, North Yorkshire =

Hamlet in North Yorkshire, England

Coordinates: 54°23′09″N 1°55′50″W

Fremington
- Location within North Yorkshire
- OS grid reference: SE046988
- Civil parish: Reeth, Fremington and Healaugh
- Unitary authority: North Yorkshire
- Ceremonial county: North Yorkshire
- Region: Yorkshire and the Humber
- Country: England
- Sovereign state: United Kingdom
- Post town: RICHMOND
- Postcode district: DL11
- Police: North Yorkshire
- Fire: North Yorkshire
- Ambulance: Yorkshire

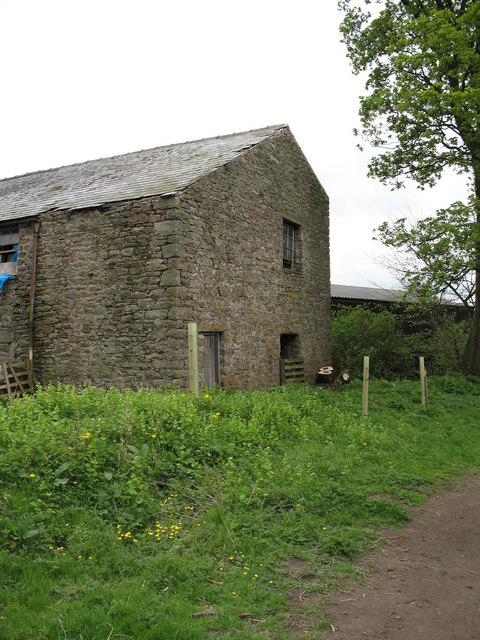
Fremington Mill, driven by the Arkle Beck, now a barn

Fremington is a hamlet in the Yorkshire Dales in North Yorkshire, England. The hamlet is almost joined to Reeth to the north, and Grinton to the south. It is split into Low Fremington, which is built along the B6270, and High Fremington, which is a scattering of houses running up towards Fremington Edge.

From 1974 to 2023 it was part of the district of Richmondshire. It is now administered by the unitary North Yorkshire Council.

The origin of the place name is from the Old English words Fremi (or Frema), ing and tun and means estate associated with a man named Fremi (or Frema). It appears as Fremington in the Domesday Book of 1086.

In the 19th century, a hoard of 1st-century Roman horse-harness fittings known as the Fremington Hagg Hoard was found near Fremington.

== See also ==
- Listed buildings in Reeth, Fremington and Healaugh
