= Reeth =

Village in North Yorkshire, England

Coordinates: 54°23′21″N 1°56′32″W

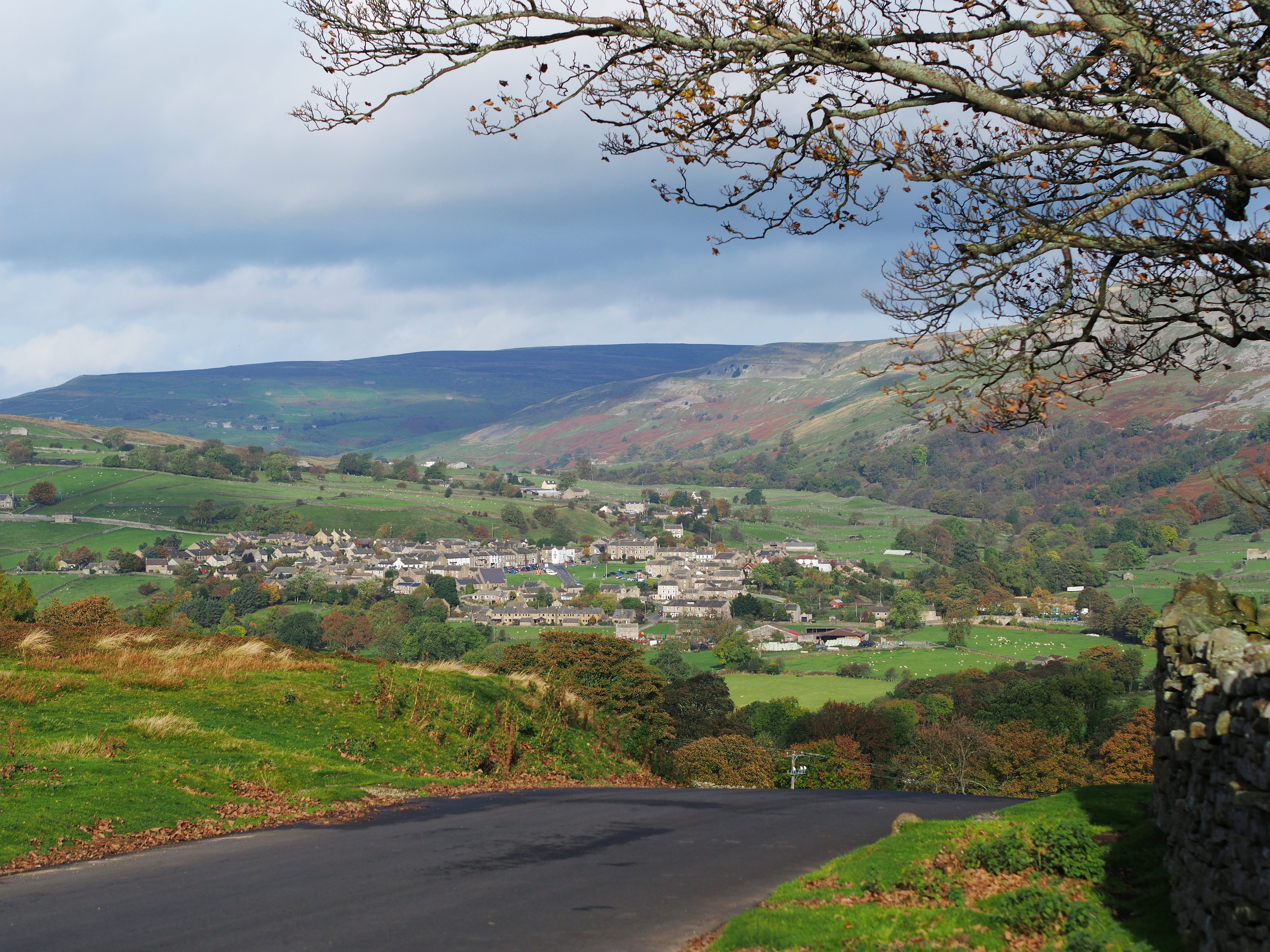
- Reeth as seen from Grinton Lodge Youth Hostel

- Location within North Yorkshire
- Population: 724
- OS grid reference: SE037991
- Civil parish: Reeth, Fremington and Healaugh
- Unitary authority: North Yorkshire
- Ceremonial county: North Yorkshire
- Region: Yorkshire and the Humber
- Country: England
- Sovereign state: United Kingdom
- Post town: RICHMOND
- Postcode district: DL11
- Dialling code: 01748
- Police: North Yorkshire
- Fire: North Yorkshire
- Ambulance: Yorkshire
- UK Parliament: Richmond and Northallerton

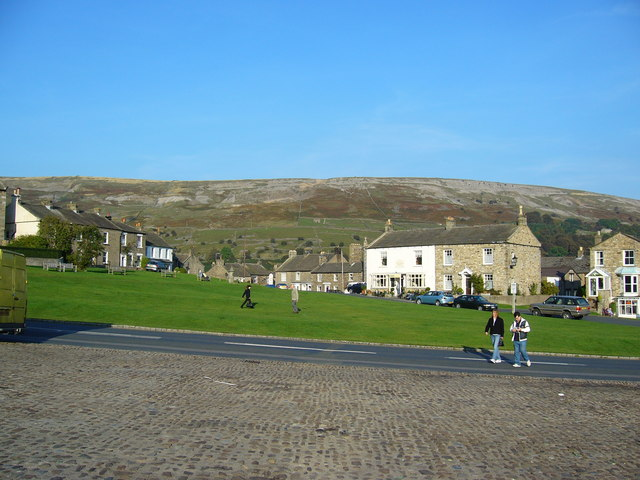
Village green

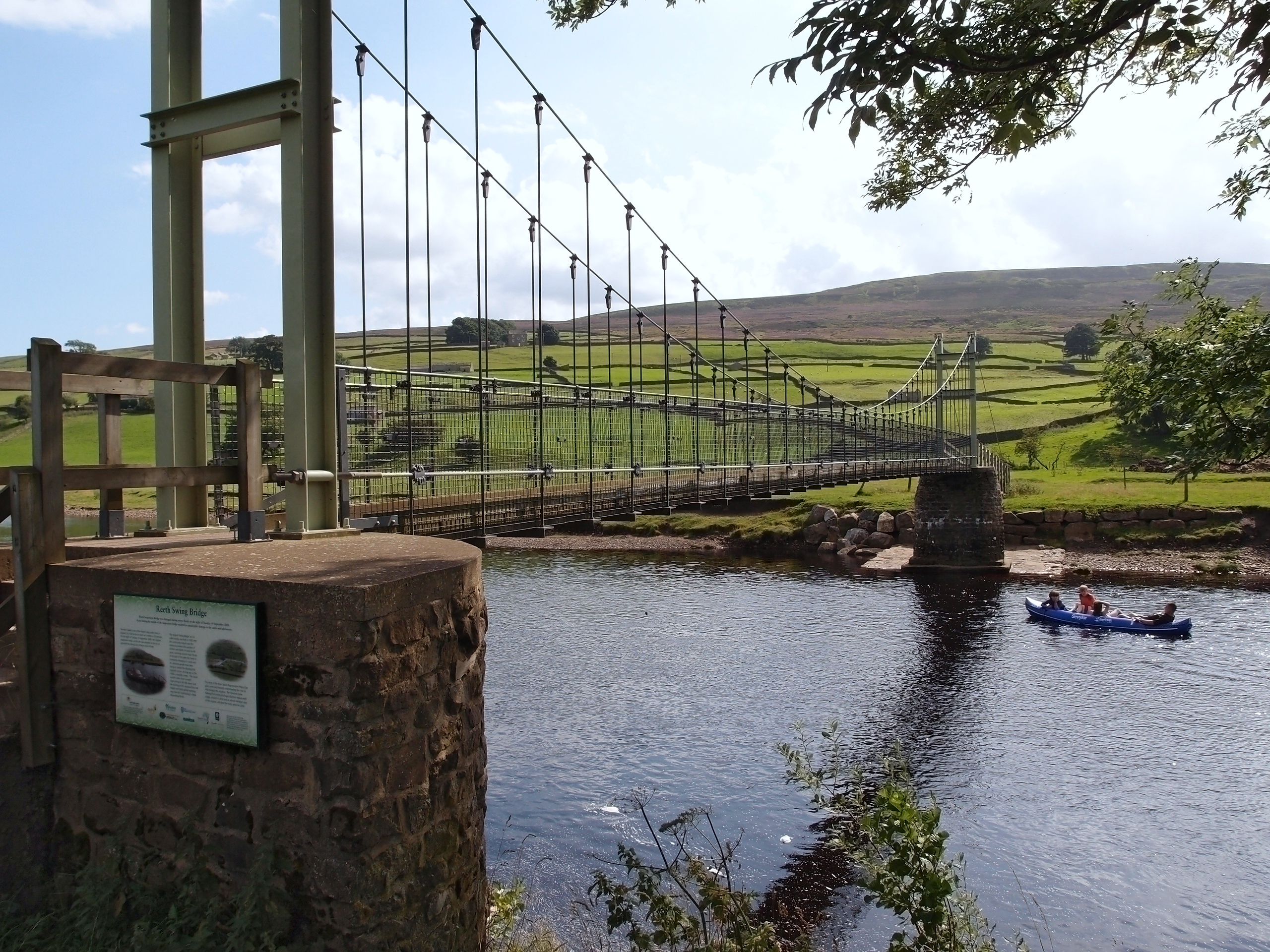
Swing bridge at Reeth built in 1920 was demolished by an uprooted tree in 2000. What stands now is a replica, opened in 2002

Reeth is a village 11 miles (18 km) west of Richmond in North Yorkshire, England, in the civil parish of Reeth, Fremington and Healaugh. Historically part of the North Riding of Yorkshire, it is the principal settlement of upper Swaledale.

== Etymology ==
The origin of the name Reeth is unclear. It is possibly derived from the Germanic for 'place by the stream', although this claim can neither be confirmed nor refuted. Reeth could also have been derived from the Cumbric rith (cf. ryd in Modern Welsh, rys in Cornish ), meaning 'Ford'. Either would make sense as Reeth is located near two shallow rivers.

== History ==
In Saxon times, Reeth was only a settlement on the forest edge, but by the time of the Norman conquest it had grown sufficiently in importance to be noted in the Domesday Book. Later it became a centre for hand-knitting and the local lead industry was controlled from here, but it was always a market centre for the local farming community.

Built in 1783, The Burgoyne Hotel (named after Mrs Burgoyne Johnson) stands on Reeth's idyllic green, the late Georgian county house hotel is full of history and elegant charm with many of its original features. The hotel previously known as Hill House, was made into guest accommodation and then a hotel after the Second World War. May Sinclair features Hill House in her novel, The Three Sisters, as the home of Miss Kendal. The "Swaledale Walk 5 May Sinclair's Reeth", is a short walk that takes you around and above Reeth to discover pivotal places featured in two of her novels.

On 5 July 2014, the Tour de France Stage 1 from Leeds to Harrogate passed through the village.

== Governance ==
The village lies within the Richmond and Northallerton parliamentary constituency, which has been represented since 2015 by Conservative Rishi Sunak, who took over from retiring fellow Conservative William Hague. From 1974 to 2023 it was part of the district of Richmondshire. It is now administered by the unitary North Yorkshire Council.

== Geography ==
Reeth is located on the B6270 road that crosses the entirety of Swaledale, linking Richmond with Kirkby Stephen in Cumbria. Historically, Grinton was the most important settlement in the Upper Swaledale area as it had a church, but Reeth is now the largest and principal settlement. Nearby settlements to Reeth include the fellow parish villages of Fremington 0.5 miles (0.8 km) east and Healaugh 1.4 miles (2.3 km) to the west, as well as Grinton, 1.5 miles (2.4 km) to the east. Reeth is situated at the meeting point of the two most northerly of the Yorkshire Dales: Swaledale and Arkengarthdale. It is also near to Reeth that Arkle Beck from the north joins the River Swale. The village is overlooked by the surrounding fells of Harkerside Moor, Fremington Edge and Calver Hill. Alfred Wainwright's Coast to Coast Walk, a popular long-distance footpath from Saint Bees to Robin Hood's Bay, passes through Reeth.

=== Demography ===
For the parish of Reeth, Fremington and Healaugh:

Population
Year	1881	1891	1901	1911	1921	1931	1951	1961	1971	2001	2011
Total	988	667	570	628	709	616	588	540	530	685	724

== Community and culture ==
Primary education is provided by Reeth Community Primary School, which is engaged in a confederation with nearby Gunnerside Methodist Primary School. Pupils then receive secondary education at Richmond School & Sixth Form College.

In May and June every year Reeth becomes the hub of the Swaledale Festival, a two-week celebration of music and guided walks. This had to be cancelled in 2020 owing to Coronavirus. Additionally on the final Wednesday of August the Reeth Show, an agricultural event, is held. In 2012 it celebrated its centenary.

Firework displays are held in November and at New Year on the village green.

Reeth is also home to the Swaledale Museum, which covers rural history including life and work in the local area of Swaledale and Arkengarthdale within the Yorkshire Dales National Park.

=== Amenities ===
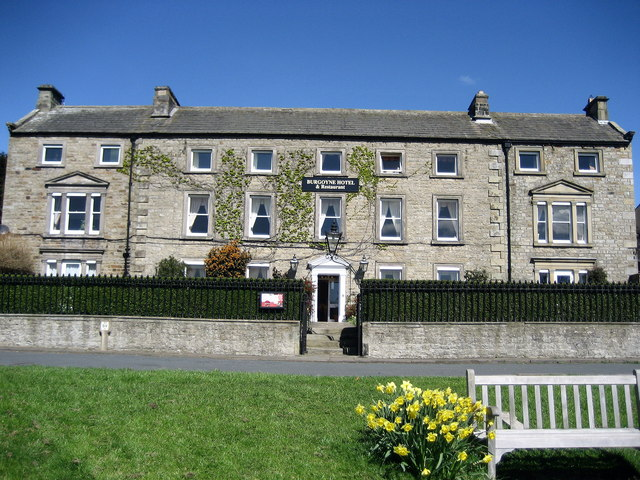
Burgoyne Hotel, Reeth

Village amenities include three public houses (the Black Bull Hotel, the Buck Hotel and The King's Arms Hotel), a caravan and camp site, a village shop and post office, two bakeries, a cafe, eleven guest houses variously bed and breakfast or self-catering, two hotels, a community centre, two churches, Reeth Memorial Hall and the Swaledale Museum.

One of five National Park Centres for the Yorkshire Dales is located in Reeth. The local health establishment is Reeth Medical Centre, which serves more 1,600 patients over an area of 200 square miles (520 km^{2}). In 2021, the medical centre was rated as 24th in England for patient satisfaction, and in 2022, it was ranked as the second best in all of England.

Reeth is home to the Reeth Dales Craft Centre, there are 12 units containing artists, an artisan cheese-maker, a shoemaker, metalworker and several fibre arts outlets supplying wool and yarn related products and accessories. The Craft Bakery has won several awards.

=== Religion ===
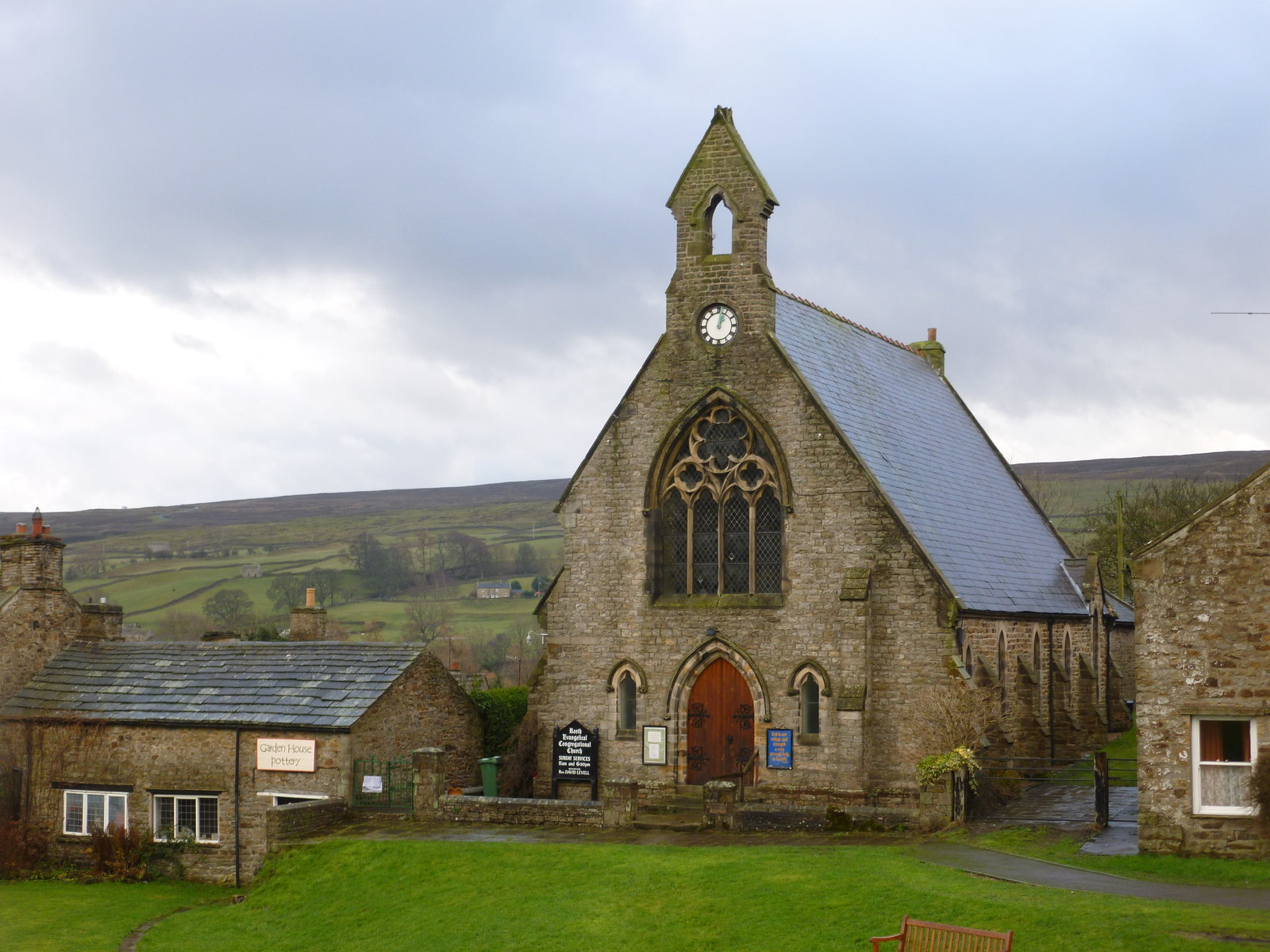
Evangelical Congregational church, Reeth

Reeth is home to two church buildings. Reeth Methodist Church had been in use since 1822, although Methodists have been worshipping in the village since at least 1766. It closed in 2016. The Reeth Evangelical Congregational Church is located on the village green.

== Notable people ==
- David Bradberry (1736–1803) – nonconformist minister
- Ruby Ferguson (1899–1966) – novelist
- Clive Russell (born 1945) – actor and voice-over artist
- Arthur Shepherd (1884–1951) – Member of Parliament

== See also ==
- Listed buildings in Reeth, Fremington and Healaugh
