= Healaugh, Richmondshire =

Village in North Yorkshire, England

Coordinates: 54.38709°N 1.97477°W

Healaugh
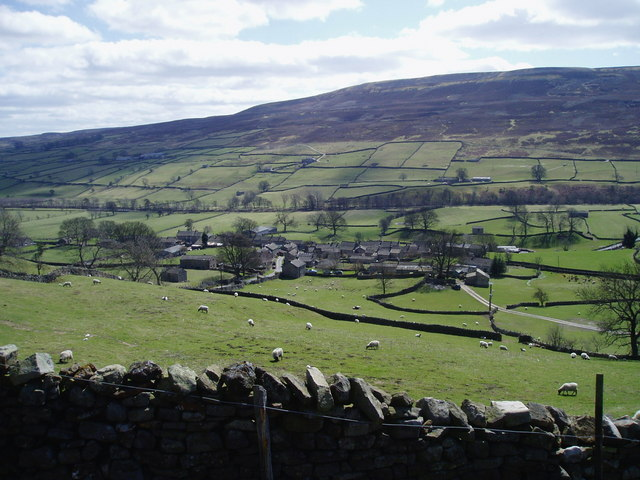
- Healaugh village

- Location within North Yorkshire
- OS grid reference: SE017990
- Unitary authority: North Yorkshire
- Ceremonial county: North Yorkshire
- Region: Yorkshire and the Humber
- Country: England
- Sovereign state: United Kingdom
- Post town: Richmond
- Postcode district: DL11
- Police: North Yorkshire
- Fire: North Yorkshire
- Ambulance: Yorkshire
- UK Parliament: Richmond and Northallerton

Healaugh (pronounced "hee-law") is a small village in the civil parish of Reeth, Fremington and Healaugh, in Swaledale in the Yorkshire Dales. part of the county of North Yorkshire, England and lies about 1 mile west of Reeth.

From 1974 to 2023 it was part of the district of Richmondshire, it is now administered by the unitary North Yorkshire Council.

The name Healaugh is derived from a Saxon word (Heah) meaning a high-level forest clearing.

The village is small, with no amenities except a stone trough fed by a hillside stream, and the village telephone box. The latter is unusually well endowed, with a carpet, waste paper bin, ash tray, directories and fresh flowers. Visitors may leave a donation.

On 5 July 2014, the Tour de France Stage 1 from Leeds to Harrogate passed through the village.

== See also ==
- Listed buildings in Reeth, Fremington and Healaugh
