= David Bradberry =

David Bradberry, sometimes called Bradbury (1736–1803), was an English nonconformist minister.

== Life ==
Bradberry appears to have been resident in London in 1768, and for a time was minister of the congregation at Glovers' Hall, London, which then belonged to the baptists; but he went from Ramsgate to Manchester, where he succeeded the Rev. Timothy Priestley, brother of Joseph Priestley, 14 August 1785, as the minister of a congregational church in Cannon Street. He was not very successful in his ministry, which was disturbed by controversy, especially with some Scottish members, who were anxious to import the fashion of 'ruling elders,' and who eventually seceded and erected in Mosley Street what was then the largest dissenting chapel in Lancashire (according to Robert Halley). He resigned his position in 1794 and left the neighbourhood. He is buried in Bunhill Fields, where his gravestone states that he 'died 13 Jan. 1803, aged 67 years; having been a preacher of the gospel forty-two years.'

== Works ==
Bradberry was the author of:

- 'A Challenge sent by the Lord of Hosts to the Chief of Sinners,' a sermon upon Amos iv. 12, London, printed for the author, 1766.
- 'Letter Relative to the Test Act,' 1789.
- 'Tetelestai, the Final Close.' a poem, in six parts, Manchester, 1704. This poem describes the day of judgment from an evangelical standpoint, in an unusual metre. The book is also a literary curiosity from its dedication, addressed to the Deity, who is styled, among many other titles, 'His most sublime, most high and mighty, most puissant, most sacred, most faithful, most gracious, most catholic, most serene, most reverend,' and 'Governor-general of the World, Chief Shepherd or Archbishop of Souls, Chief Justice of Final Appeals, Judge of the Last Assize, Distributor of Rights and Finisher of Fates, Father of Mercies and Friend of Men'.
