= List of United Kingdom locations: He-Hem =

The United Kingdom

This is part of the list of United Kingdom locations: a gazetteer of place names in the United Kingdom showing each place's locality and geographical coordinates.

== He ==
=== Hea ===
Location	Locality	Coordinates (links to map & photo sources)	OS grid reference
Heacham	Norfolk	52.90°N 00.48°E	TF6737
Headbourne Worthy	Hampshire	51.08°N 01.31°W	SU4832
Headbrook	Herefordshire	52.19°N 03.02°W	SO3056
Headcorn	Kent	51.16°N 00.61°E	TQ8344
Headingley	Leeds	53.81°N 01.57°W	SE2836
Headington	Oxfordshire	51.75°N 01.21°W	SP5407
Headington Hill	Oxfordshire	51.75°N 01.23°W	SP5306
Headlam	Durham	54.56°N 01.72°W	NZ1819
Headless Cross	Worcestershire	52.28°N 01.95°W	SP0365
Headless Cross	Cumbria	54.19°N 02.95°W	SD3878
Headley (Basingstoke and Deane)	Hampshire	51.35°N 01.26°W	SU5162
Headley (East Hampshire)	Hampshire	51.11°N 00.82°W	SU8236
Headley	Surrey	51.27°N 00.28°W	TQ2054
Headley Down	Hampshire	51.11°N 00.81°W	SU8336
Headley Heath	Worcestershire	52.38°N 01.91°W	SP0676
Headley Park	City of Bristol	51.41°N 02.61°W	ST5769
Head of Muir	Falkirk	56.00°N 03.91°W	NS8181
Headon	Devon	50.79°N 04.32°W	SS3602
Headon	Nottinghamshire	53.28°N 00.89°W	SK7477
Heads	South Lanarkshire	55.70°N 04.03°W	NS7247
Headshaw	Scottish Borders	55.48°N 02.85°W	NT4622
Heads Nook	Cumbria	54.88°N 02.79°W	NY4955
Heads of Ayr	South Ayrshire	55.42°N 04.72°W	NS276176
Headstone	Harrow	51.58°N 00.37°W	TQ1389
Headwell	Fife	56.07°N 03.46°W	NT0988
Heady Hill	Rochdale	53.58°N 02.24°W	SD8410
Heage	Derbyshire	53.04°N 01.44°W	SK3750
Healaugh (Richmondshire)	North Yorkshire	54.38°N 01.98°W	SE0199
Healaugh (Selby)	North Yorkshire	53.91°N 01.25°W	SE4947
Heald Green	Stockport	53.36°N 02.22°W	SJ8585
Healds Green	Oldham	53.55°N 02.16°W	SD8907
Heale (Curry Rivel)	Somerset	51.02°N 02.88°W	ST3825
Heale (Downhead)	Somerset	51.19°N 02.45°W	ST6844
Heale (Corfe)	Somerset	50.96°N 03.08°W	ST2419
Healey	Northumberland	54.91°N 01.98°W	NZ0158
Healey	Kirklees	53.71°N 01.66°W	SE2224
Healey	North Yorkshire	54.21°N 01.72°W	SE1880
Healey	Wakefield	53.66°N 01.59°W	SE2719
Healey	Rochdale	53.63°N 02.18°W	SD8815
Healey Cote	Northumberland	55.29°N 01.82°W	NU1100
Healeyfield	Durham	54.82°N 01.90°W	NZ0648
Healey Hall	Northumberland	54.90°N 02.00°W	NZ0057
Healing	North East Lincolnshire	53.57°N 00.17°W	TA2110
Heamoor	Cornwall	50.12°N 05.55°W	SW4631
Heaning	Cumbria	54.38°N 02.87°W	SD4399
Heanish	Argyll and Bute	56.48°N 06.82°W	NM0343
Heanor	Derbyshire	53.00°N 01.36°W	SK4346
Heanor Gate	Derbyshire	53.00°N 01.37°W	SK4245
Heanton Punchardon	Devon	51.09°N 04.14°W	SS5035
Heap Bridge	Rochdale	53.58°N 02.27°W	SD8210
Heapey	Lancashire	53.676°N 02.597°W	SD6020
Heapham	Lincolnshire	53.38°N 00.69°W	SK8788
Hearn	Hampshire	51.12°N 00.81°W	SU8337
Hearnden Green	Kent	51.18°N 00.60°E	TQ8246
Hearthstone	Derbyshire	53.11°N 01.55°W	SK3058
Heart's Delight	Kent	51.32°N 00.69°E	TQ8862
Heasley Mill	Devon	51.07°N 03.81°W	SS7332
Heaste	Highland	57.18°N 05.90°W	NG6417
Heath	Cardiff	51.50°N 03.19°W	ST1779
Heath	Cheshire	53.32°N 02.75°W	SJ5081
Heath	Derbyshire	53.18°N 01.34°W	SK4466
Heath and Reach	Bedfordshire	51.93°N 00.66°W	SP9227
Heath Charnock	Lancashire	53.62°N 02.62°W	SD5914
Heath Common	West Sussex	50.91°N 00.42°W	TQ1114
Heath Common	Wakefield	53.66°N 01.47°W	SE3519
Heathcote	Warwickshire	52.26°N 01.56°W	SP3063
Heathcote	Derbyshire	53.13°N 01.79°W	SK1460
Heathcote	Shropshire	52.84°N 02.52°W	SJ6528
Heath Cross (Teignbridge)	Devon	50.73°N 03.64°W	SX8494
Heath Cross (West Devon)	Devon	50.75°N 03.84°W	SX7097
Heath End (Cholesbury)	Buckinghamshire	51.74°N 00.62°W	SP9506
Heath End (Great Missenden)	Buckinghamshire	51.67°N 00.72°W	SU8898
Heath End	Leicestershire	52.78°N 01.46°W	SK3621
Heath End (Tadley)	Hampshire	51.35°N 01.16°W	SU5862
Heath End (East Woodhay)	Hampshire	51.35°N 01.41°W	SU4162
Heath End	South Gloucestershire	51.59°N 02.44°W	ST6989
Heath End	Surrey	51.23°N 00.79°W	SU8449
Heath End	Walsall	52.61°N 01.97°W	SK0202
Heath End	Warwickshire	52.23°N 01.66°W	SP2360
Heath End	West Sussex	50.95°N 00.63°W	SU9618
Heather	Leicestershire	52.68°N 01.43°W	SK3810
Heathercombe	Devon	50.61°N 03.82°W	SX7181
Heatherfield	Highland	57.39°N 06.19°W	NG4841
Heatherlea	Highland	57.39°N 03.41°W	NJ1535
Heather Row	Hampshire	51.26°N 00.98°W	SU7152
Heatherside	Surrey	51.32°N 00.70°W	SU9059
Heathfield	Cambridgeshire	52.09°N 00.11°E	TL4546
Heathfield	Devon	50.57°N 03.65°W	SX8376
Heathfield (Heathfield and Waldron)	East Sussex	50.96°N 00.24°E	TQ5821
Heathfield (Rotherfield)	East Sussex	51.04°N 00.22°E	TQ5630
Heathfield	Gloucestershire	51.68°N 02.43°W	ST7098
Heathfield	Hampshire	50.85°N 01.21°W	SU5506
Heathfield	Lincolnshire	53.42°N 00.33°W	TF1193
Heathfield	North Yorkshire	54.09°N 01.80°W	SE1367
Heathfield (West Bagborough)	Somerset	51.09°N 03.20°W	ST1633
Heathfield (Oake)	Somerset	51.02°N 03.19°W	ST1626
Heathfield	South Ayrshire	55.47°N 04.61°W	NS3523
Heath Green	Hampshire	51.12°N 01.10°W	SU6337
Heath Green	Worcestershire	52.33°N 01.89°W	SP0771
Heathhall	Dumfries and Galloway	55.09°N 03.58°W	NX9979
Heath Hayes	Staffordshire	52.68°N 01.98°W	SK0110
Heath Hill	Shropshire	52.72°N 02.35°W	SJ7614
Heath House	Somerset	51.21°N 02.83°W	ST4246
Heathlands	Berkshire	51.37°N 00.82°W	SU8265
Heath Lanes	Shropshire	52.77°N 02.57°W	SJ6120
Heath Park	Havering	51.57°N 00.19°E	TQ5288
Heathryfold	City of Aberdeen	57.16°N 02.16°W	NJ9008
Heath Side	Kent	51.42°N 00.17°E	TQ5172
Heathstock	Devon	50.82°N 03.08°W	ST2403
Heathton	Shropshire	52.52°N 02.28°W	SO8192
Heathtop	Derbyshire	52.88°N 01.70°W	SK2032
Heath Town	Wolverhampton	52.58°N 02.11°W	SO9299
Heathwaite	Cumbria	54.36°N 02.90°W	SD4197
Heathwaite	North Yorkshire	54.40°N 01.26°W	NZ4801
Heatley	Cheshire	53.38°N 02.45°W	SJ7088
Heatley	Staffordshire	52.84°N 01.91°W	SK0627
Heaton	Newcastle upon Tyne	54.98°N 01.57°W	NZ2766
Heaton	Bradford	53.81°N 01.80°W	SE1335
Heaton	Lancashire	54.03°N 02.85°W	SD4460
Heaton	Bolton	53.57°N 02.46°W	SD6909
Heaton	Staffordshire	53.15°N 02.07°W	SJ9562
Heaton Chapel	Stockport	53.42°N 02.18°W	SJ8892
Heaton Mersey	Stockport	53.41°N 02.21°W	SJ8691
Heaton Moor	Stockport	53.41°N 02.19°W	SJ8791
Heaton Norris	Stockport	53.40°N 02.18°W	SJ8890
Heaton Royds	Bradford	53.82°N 01.80°W	SE1336
Heaton's Bridge	Lancashire	53.59°N 02.90°W	SD4011
Heaton Shay	Bradford	53.82°N 01.80°W	SE1336
Heaven's Door	Somerset	50.98°N 02.57°W	ST6021
Heaverham	Kent	51.29°N 00.25°E	TQ5758
Heaviley	Stockport	53.38°N 02.15°W	SJ9088
Heavitree	Devon	50.71°N 03.50°W	SX9492

=== Heb ===
Location	Locality	Coordinates (links to map & photo sources)	OS grid reference
Hebburn	South Tyneside	54.97°N 01.51°W	NZ3164
Hebburn Colliery	South Tyneside	54.97°N 01.51°W	NZ3165
Hebburn New Town	South Tyneside	54.97°N 01.53°W	NZ3064
Hebden	North Yorkshire	54.06°N 01.97°W	SE0263
Hebden Bridge	Calderdale	53.73°N 02.03°W	SD9827
Hebden Green	Cheshire	53.18°N 02.57°W	SJ6265
Hebing End	Hertfordshire	51.88°N 00.09°W	TL3122
Hebron	Carmarthenshire	51.91°N 04.64°W	SN1827
Hebron	Northumberland	55.19°N 01.70°W	NZ1989
Hebron	Isle of Anglesey	53.33°N 04.32°W	SH4584

=== Hec ===
Location	Locality	Coordinates (links to map & photo sources)	OS grid reference
Heck	Dumfries and Galloway	55.10°N 03.42°W	NY0980
Heckdyke	Nottinghamshire	53.45°N 00.81°W	SK7996
Heckfield	Hampshire	51.33°N 00.96°W	SU7260
Heckfield Green	Suffolk	52.33°N 01.19°E	TM1875
Heckfordbridge	Essex	51.85°N 00.81°E	TL9421
Heckingham	Norfolk	52.52°N 01.50°E	TM3898
Heckington	Lincolnshire	52.98°N 00.30°W	TF1444
Heckmondwike	Kirklees	53.70°N 01.68°W	SE2123

=== Hed ===
Location	Locality	Coordinates (links to map & photo sources)	OS grid reference
Heddington	Wiltshire	51.39°N 02.01°W	ST9966
Heddington Wick	Wiltshire	51.39°N 02.03°W	ST9866
Heddle	Orkney Islands	58.99°N 03.13°W	HY3512
Heddon	Devon	51.03°N 03.92°W	SS6528
Heddon-on-the-Wall	Northumberland	54.98°N 01.79°W	NZ1366
Hedenham	Norfolk	52.48°N 01.40°E	TM3193
Hedge End	Hampshire	50.90°N 01.30°W	SU4912
Hedge End	Dorset	50.85°N 02.25°W	ST8206
Hedge-end Island	Essex	51.87°N 01.25°E	TM243242
Hedgehog Bridge	Lincolnshire	52.99°N 00.13°W	TF2546
Hedgerley	Buckinghamshire	51.57°N 00.61°W	SU9687
Hedgerley Green	Buckinghamshire	51.57°N 00.60°W	SU9787
Hedgerley Hill	Buckinghamshire	51.56°N 00.60°W	SU9786
Hedging	Somerset	51.05°N 03.00°W	ST3029
Hedley Hill	Durham	54.76°N 01.76°W	NZ1541
Hedley on the Hill	Northumberland	54.92°N 01.89°W	NZ0759
Hednesford	Staffordshire	52.70°N 02.00°W	SK0012
Hedon	East Riding of Yorkshire	53.73°N 00.19°W	TA1928
Hedsor	Buckinghamshire	51.57°N 00.68°W	SU9187
Hedworth	South Tyneside	54.96°N 01.48°W	NZ3363

=== Hee ===
Location	Locality	Coordinates (links to map & photo sources)	OS grid reference
Heelands	Milton Keynes	52.04°N 00.79°W	SP8339
Heeley	Sheffield	53.35°N 01.47°W	SK3584

=== Heg ===
Location	Locality	Coordinates (links to map & photo sources)	OS grid reference
Heggle Lane	Cumbria	54.70°N 02.99°W	NY3635
Heglibister	Shetland Islands	60.24°N 01.31°W	HU3851

=== Hei ===
Location	Locality	Coordinates (links to map & photo sources)	OS grid reference
Heighington	Darlington	54.59°N 01.63°W	NZ2422
Heighington	Lincolnshire	53.20°N 00.45°W	TF0369
Heighley	Staffordshire	53.02°N 02.34°W	SJ7747
Height End	Lancashire	53.70°N 02.31°W	SD7923
Heightington	Worcestershire	52.33°N 02.35°W	SO7671
Heights	Oldham	53.56°N 02.03°W	SD9808
Heights of Kinlochewe	Highland	57.62°N 05.25°W	NH0664
Heisker (Monach Islands)	Western Isles	57.52°N 07.61°W	NF639618
Heiton	Scottish Borders	55.56°N 02.46°W	NT7130

=== Hel ===
Location	Locality	Coordinates (links to map & photo sources)	OS grid reference
Helbeck	Cumbria	54.53°N 02.32°W	NY7915
Hele	Cornwall	50.81°N 04.53°W	SS2104
Hele (North Devon)	Devon	51.20°N 04.10°W	SS5347
Hele (Torridge)	Devon	50.69°N 04.36°W	SX3391
Hele (Mid Devon)	Devon	50.80°N 03.43°W	SS9902
Hele (Torquay)	Devon	50.47°N 03.55°W	SX9065
Hele (Teignbridge)	Devon	50.51°N 03.77°W	SX7470
Hele	Somerset	51.00°N 03.17°W	ST1824
Helebridge	Cornwall	50.79°N 04.54°W	SS2103
Helensburgh	Argyll and Bute	56.00°N 04.74°W	NS2982
Helford	Cornwall	50.09°N 05.14°W	SW7526
Helford Passage	Cornwall	50.09°N 05.13°W	SW7626
Helham Green	Hertfordshire	51.81°N 00.01°E	TL3915
Helhoughton	Norfolk	52.79°N 00.75°E	TF8626
Helions Bumpstead	Essex	52.04°N 00.40°E	TL6541
Hellaby	Rotherham	53.42°N 01.24°W	SK5092
Helland	Somerset	51.01°N 02.97°W	ST3224
Helland	Cornwall	50.49°N 04.72°W	SX0770
Hellandbridge	Cornwall	50.50°N 04.73°W	SX0671
Hell Corner	Berkshire	51.37°N 01.45°W	SU3864
Hellesdon	Norfolk	52.66°N 01.25°E	TG2012
Hellesveor	Cornwall	50.20°N 05.50°W	SW5040
Helliar Holm	Orkney Islands	59.02°N 02.90°W	HY481156
Hellidon	Northamptonshire	52.21°N 01.25°W	SP5158
Hellifield	North Yorkshire	54.00°N 02.23°W	SD8556
Hellifield Green	North Yorkshire	54.00°N 02.23°W	SD8556
Helli Ness	Shetland Islands	60.03°N 01.19°W	HU448284
Hellingly	East Sussex	50.88°N 00.24°E	TQ5812
Hellington	Norfolk	52.57°N 01.40°E	TG3103
Hellisay	Western Isles	57.01°N 07.34°W	NF756043
Hellister	Shetland Islands	60.22°N 01.31°W	HU3849
Hellman's Cross	Essex	51.83°N 00.29°E	TL5818
Helm	North Yorkshire	54.31°N 02.10°W	SD9391
Helmburn	Scottish Borders	55.50°N 02.96°W	NT3924
Helmdon	Northamptonshire	52.08°N 01.15°W	SP5843
Helme	Kirklees	53.59°N 01.86°W	SE0911
Helmingham	Suffolk	52.16°N 01.18°E	TM1857
Helmington Row	Durham	54.71°N 01.72°W	NZ1835
Helmsdale	Highland	58.11°N 03.66°W	ND0215
Helmshore	Lancashire	53.68°N 02.33°W	SD7821
Helmside	Cumbria	54.28°N 02.49°W	SD6888
Helmsley	North Yorkshire	54.24°N 01.06°W	SE6184
Helperby	North Yorkshire	54.11°N 01.34°W	SE4369
Helperthorpe	North Yorkshire	54.11°N 00.54°W	SE9570
Helpringham	Lincolnshire	52.94°N 00.31°W	TF1340
Helpston	Cambridgeshire	52.63°N 00.34°W	TF1205
Helsby	Cheshire	53.26°N 02.78°W	SJ4875
Helscott	Cornwall	50.79°N 04.54°W	SS2102
Helsey	Lincolnshire	53.22°N 00.26°E	TF5172
Helston	Cornwall	50.09°N 05.27°W	SW6627
Helstone	Cornwall	50.59°N 04.71°W	SX0881
Helston Water	Cornwall	50.22°N 05.11°W	SW7841
Helton	Cumbria	54.59°N 02.75°W	NY5122
Helwith	North Yorkshire	54.42°N 01.88°W	NZ0702
Helwith Bridge	North Yorkshire	54.11°N 02.29°W	SD8169
Helygain (Halkyn)	Flintshire	53.23°N 03.18°W	SJ2171

=== Hem ===
Location	Locality	Coordinates (links to map & photo sources)	OS grid reference
Hemblington	Norfolk	52.64°N 01.45°E	TG3411
Hemblington Corner	Norfolk	52.64°N 01.44°E	TG3311
Hembridge	Somerset	51.12°N 02.58°W	ST5936
Hemel Hempstead	Hertfordshire	51.75°N 00.46°W	TL0607
Hemerdon	Devon	50.39°N 04.02°W	SX5657
Hemford	Shropshire	52.59°N 03.00°W	SJ3200
Hem Heath	City of Stoke-on-Trent	52.96°N 02.18°W	SJ8841
Hemingbrough	North Yorkshire	53.76°N 00.98°W	SE6730
Hemingby	Lincolnshire	53.24°N 00.15°W	TF2374
Hemingfield	Barnsley	53.50°N 01.41°W	SE3901
Hemingford Abbots	Cambridgeshire	52.31°N 00.13°W	TL2770
Hemingford Grey	Cambridgeshire	52.31°N 00.10°W	TL2970
Hemingstone	Suffolk	52.13°N 01.14°E	TM1553
Hemington	Leicestershire	52.84°N 01.33°W	SK4528
Hemington	Northamptonshire	52.45°N 00.39°W	TL0985
Hemington	Somerset	51.27°N 02.40°W	ST7253
Hemley	Suffolk	52.02°N 01.32°E	TM2842
Hemlington	Middlesbrough	54.51°N 01.24°W	NZ4914
Hemp Green	Suffolk	52.26°N 01.47°E	TM3769
Hempholme	East Riding of Yorkshire	53.94°N 00.34°W	TA0850
Hempnall	Norfolk	52.49°N 01.29°E	TM2494
Hempnall Green	Norfolk	52.48°N 01.29°E	TM2493
Hemp's Green	Essex	51.92°N 00.77°E	TL9129
Hempshill Vale	Nottinghamshire	52.99°N 01.22°W	SK5244
Hempstead	Essex	52.01°N 00.37°E	TL6338
Hempstead	Kent	51.34°N 00.56°E	TQ7964
Hempstead (near Holt)	Norfolk	52.88°N 01.12°E	TG1037
Hempstead (near Stalham)	Norfolk	52.79°N 01.55°E	TG4028
Hempsted	Gloucestershire	51.84°N 02.27°W	SO8116
Hempton	Norfolk	52.82°N 00.83°E	TF9129
Hempton	Oxfordshire	51.97°N 01.36°W	SP4431
Hempton Wainhill	Oxfordshire	51.70°N 00.90°W	SP7601
Hemsby	Norfolk	52.69°N 01.68°E	TG4917
Hemsted	Kent	51.12°N 01.05°E	TR1441
Hemswell	Lincolnshire	53.40°N 00.61°W	SK9291
Hemswell Cliff	Lincolnshire	53.38°N 00.57°W	SK9589
Hemsworth	Dorset	50.84°N 02.05°W	ST9605
Hemsworth	Sheffield	53.34°N 01.46°W	SK3683
Hemsworth	Wakefield	53.61°N 01.36°W	SE4213
Hemyock	Devon	50.91°N 03.23°W	ST1313
