= Heath Park =

Heath Park could refer to:

- Heath Park (Brisbane), Australia
- Heath Park, a large park in Heath, Cardiff, Wales
- Heath Park, Barking and Dagenham, London, England
- Heath Park, Havering, London, England
  - Heath Park (ward), an electoral ward
- Heath Park Halt railway station, a former station in Hertfordshire, England
- Heath Park School, Wolverhampton, England
