= Colchester Zoo =

Zoo in Essex, England

Colchester Zoological Society

- Interactive map of Colchester Zoological Society
- 51°51′45″N 0°49′58″E
- Date opened: 2 June 1963; 63 years ago
- Location: Heckfordbridge, Essex, England
- Land area: 60 acres (0.24 km^{2})
- No. of species: 161
- Annual visitors: 1 million
- Memberships: BIAZA, EAZA, WAZA IZEA
- Major exhibits: Edge of Africa, Dragons of Komodo, Lost Madagascar, Rajang's Forest, Tiger Taiga.
- Director: Dominique Tropeano
- Website: www.colchesterzoologicalsociety.com

Colchester Zoo is a zoological garden situated near Colchester, England. Open since June 1963, the zoo is home to many rare and endangered species, including big cats, primates and birds as well as many invertebrates and fish species.

== History ==
Established in 1963, the zoo was called Stanway Hall Park Zoo, but in the 1970s the zoo was struggling financially. Owner Frank Farrah sold the zoo for what would now become Colchester Zoo operated by the Tropeano family.

== Animal exhibits ==
The animals habitats at Colchester Zoo are presented in a number of different themed zones.

- Aardvark Burrow: Aardvark burrow is home to the zoo's Aardvarks, it features a private off-show area as well as an outdoor area that allows for burrowing.
- Australian Rainbows: Opened in summer 2014, Australian Rainbows is an exhibit that previously housed the Wild about Animals theatre. Inside the building is a waterfall, a large pond and colourful gardens. Visitors are able to walk through an aviary inhabited by free-flying rainbow lorikeets, and includes an opportunity to feed pots of nectar to the birds colourful birds.
- Bears of the Rising Sun:This enclosure is home to a pair of Malayan sun bears, a male named Jo-Jo and a female named Srey Ya. Both bears were given to the zoo by the Rare Species Conservation Centre in 2010, after being confiscated by government anti-poaching patrols in Cambodia. This enclosure is made up of 3 primary areas including large outdoor and indoor spaces as well as private dens where they cannot be seen by visitors.
- Call of the Wild: This exhibit houses Eurasian Grey wolves. They can be viewed from the Lost Madagascar Express train, and also from the glass viewing areas.
- Canopy of South America: Canopy of South America was named in 2003, it houses eastern pygmy marmosets and golden lion tamarins. It is in close proximity to Ussuri Falls with part of the leopard enclosure being visible from within.
- Capuchin Climb: Cauchin Climb was redeveloped in 2024, it houses buff-headed capuchins, it features both and indoor den and a long outdoor area for the monkeys with a sheltered viewing area.
- Chimpanzee Lookout: Revamped in 2018, a Chimpanzee Lookout is houses a breeding group of chimpanzees, Located nearby are arboreal agamid lizards, slender-snouted crocodiles and spiny turtles.
- Clock of the Mountain: Clock of the Mountain is a large aviary located within Bears of the Rising Sun, it houses rufous hornbills.
- Colenso Village: Colenso Village is an African village themed walkthrough housing domestic breeds of Sheep and Goats including Boer goats, pygmy goats, Cameroon sheep and Somali fat-tailed sheep.
- Dragons of Komodo: Colchester Zoo is one of the few zoos in the UK keeping Komodo dragons and has previously had breeding success within the EEP breeding programme for this species. The enclosure is designed to mimic conditions in the wild, and includes a large pool with showers, as well as a glass roof that can be drawn back to allow in sunlight.
- Edge of Africa: Edge of Africa is an area comprising several enclosures that can be found at the far end of the zoo, it houses Kirk's dik-diks, blue cranes, blue duikers, cheetahs, spotted hyenas, mandrills, L,Hoest's monkeyss and common warthogs.
- Elephant Kingdom: Elephant Kingdom is home to Colchester Zoo's herd of African bush elephants. It has a unique design which allows all the elephants maximum sight, sound and has specially designed night stalls, a roped off "safe area" and spacious indoor bull elephant quarters. The outdoor area features a pool and waterfall.
- Feathers of the Forest: A self sufficient walkthrough habitat that features a few tropical bird species such as Victoria crowned pigeons and crested partridges. This enclosure was known as "Butterfly Glade" before its refurbishment in 2020.
- Gelada Plateau: Gelada Plateau is home to the zoo's group of gelada baboons and Chilean flamingos, it features a rocky enclosure with climbing structures for the baboon as well as a lake for the flamingos whose enclosure can be viewed from several other parts of the zoo.
- Guinea Pig Village: The Guinea pig village opened in 2022 and was converted from the horse stable, it has several hides for the Guinea pigs themed around a typical English village featuring a church, benches, houses and a pub named "The Dandelion Inn."
- Heart of the Amazon: This complex is home to a large troop of common squirrel monkeys as well as black tree monitors, red pirahna and silver dollar. The enclosures just outside Heart of the Amazon were previously home to both black and brown bears.
- Iguana Forest: Iguana Forest is a walkthrough habitat holding several green iguanas confiscated from airport customs and yellow-footed tortoises.
- Inca Trail: Inca Trail is home to a large colony of Humboldt penguins, as well as a nearby enclosure with a troop of Guianan bearded sakis, and Rock hyrax. The area features a beach style enclosure for the penguins and aviaries for the monkeys and hyrax
- Island Dwellers: Island Dwellers is an enclosure housing a group of Philippine spotted deer.
- Kingdom of the Wild: Kingdom of the Wild multi-species complex completed in 2001, housing several different African species including reticulated giraffes, southern white rhinoceros, greater kudu, common ostriches and maneless zebras in a large savannah themed habitat while the indoor area features pygmy hippopotamuses, black-headed weavers, African rock pythons, green tree skinks, blue-tongued skinks and various species of African reptiles, invertebrates and fish.
- Koi Niwa: Built in 2013, this exhibit features two large pools housing a variety of koi. There are also two filtration systems visible to visitors. The exhibit is set in the style of a typical Japanese garden with statues, ornaments and waterfalls.
- Lion Rock: Opened in April 2004, Lion Rock previously housed African lions however it is temporarily housing a Cheetah. The indoor area of Lion Rock features an enclosure housing fennec foxes. This enclosure is set to undergo redevelopment.
- Lost Madagascar: Opened in 2012, Lost Madagascar is set of enclosures that can only be accessed by taking a ride on the zoo's road train, known as the Lost Madagascar Express. It features a walk-through enclosure that is home to troops of crowned lemurs and ring-tailed lemurs as well as bush dogs.
- Mangabey Mangrove: Mangabey Mangrove is home to a group of cherry-crowned mangabeys, it features an indoor area which can be viewed from within Feathers of the Forest as well as an outdoor area with a large climbing frame and many viewing opportunities.
- Meddelin Monkeys: The Meddelin Monkeys enclosure is home to a troop of Colombian spider monkeys.
- Otter Creek: Otter Creek was opened in August 2011 and houses a family of smooth-coated otters who are part of a Europe-wide breeding programme intended to maintain a genetically healthy insurance population in captivity.
- Out of Africa: Out of Africa opened in 2018, it houses a troop of Barbary macaques.
- Pig Patch: Pig Patch is home to a rare breed of domestic pig, the Oxford sandy and black pig.
- Rainforest Walkthrough: Rainforest Walkthough is a habitat featuring both an outdoor walkthrough habitat and an indoor viewing area, it is home to coppery titi monkeys, golden-headed lion tamarins and Linne's two-toed sloths.
- Rajang's Forest: Rajang's Forest was renamed in memory of Rajang, a hybrid orangutan who died at the age of 50 in 2018, having lived at the zoo since 1980. The enclosure is now currently home to a group of Bornean orangutans but also features two aquariums that contain giant Asian pond turtles, archer fish, azure damselfish, blackspot pufferfish and blue tangs.
- River's Edge: River's Edge is a group of enclosures housing various different species from across Asia. Among the species on display in River's Edge are pileated gibbons, red pandas, wreathed hornbill, binturongs, Asian small-clawed otters, emerald tree monitors, giant anteaters green anacondas, grey crowned cranes and lion-tailed macaques. This area opened in 2021 after being redeveloped and renamed from the previous "Wilds of Asia"
- Southern Wild: Southern Wild is an enclosure home to the zoo's Alpacas and Llamas.
- Suricata Sands: Opened in May 2009, Suricata Sands houses a mob of slender-tailed meerkats. It is made up from a large sandy outdoor enclosure that allows for burrowing and a heated indoor space.
- Tiger Taiga: Tiger Taiga is large complex area home to two Amur tigers, called Taiga and Tatana. Its made up of multiple areas, pools and a high viewing platform for the tigers as well as a viewing tunnel that runs through the enclosure leads viewers into the Nature Area.
- Ussuri Falls: Opened in February 2010, this enclosure houses a breeding pair of Amur leopards.
- Vulture Valley: Vulture Valley features an aviary containing both African white-backed vultures and Ruppell's griffon vultures.
- Walking Giants: Walking Giants opened in the summer of 2012 and is split into two sections. The complex houses two of the world's biggest tortoise species being Aldabra giant tortoises and African spurred tortoises.
- World of Wings: An aviary complex that houses three species of birds of prey, Andean condors, great grey owls and king vultures.
- Worlds Apart: Opened in May 2008, Worlds Apart comprises several enclosures that are home to Fiji banded iguanas, Goeldi's monkeys, green and black poison dart frogs, rhinoceros iguanas, Solomon Islands skinks southern tamandua, Trinidad poison dart frogs and white-lipped tamarin.

== Gallery ==
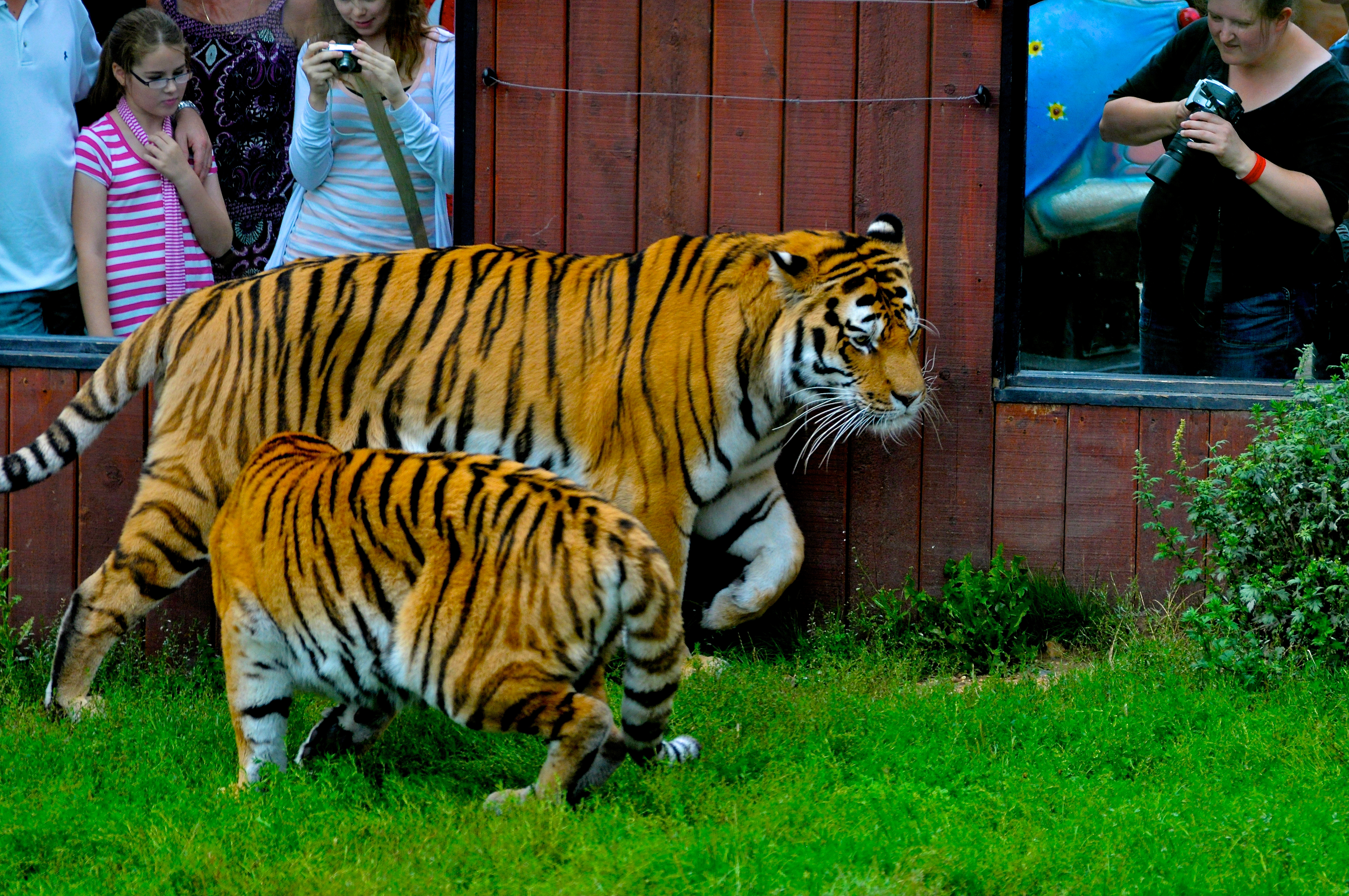
Part of the Tiger Taiga exhibit which allows visitors a close-up view of the tigers.

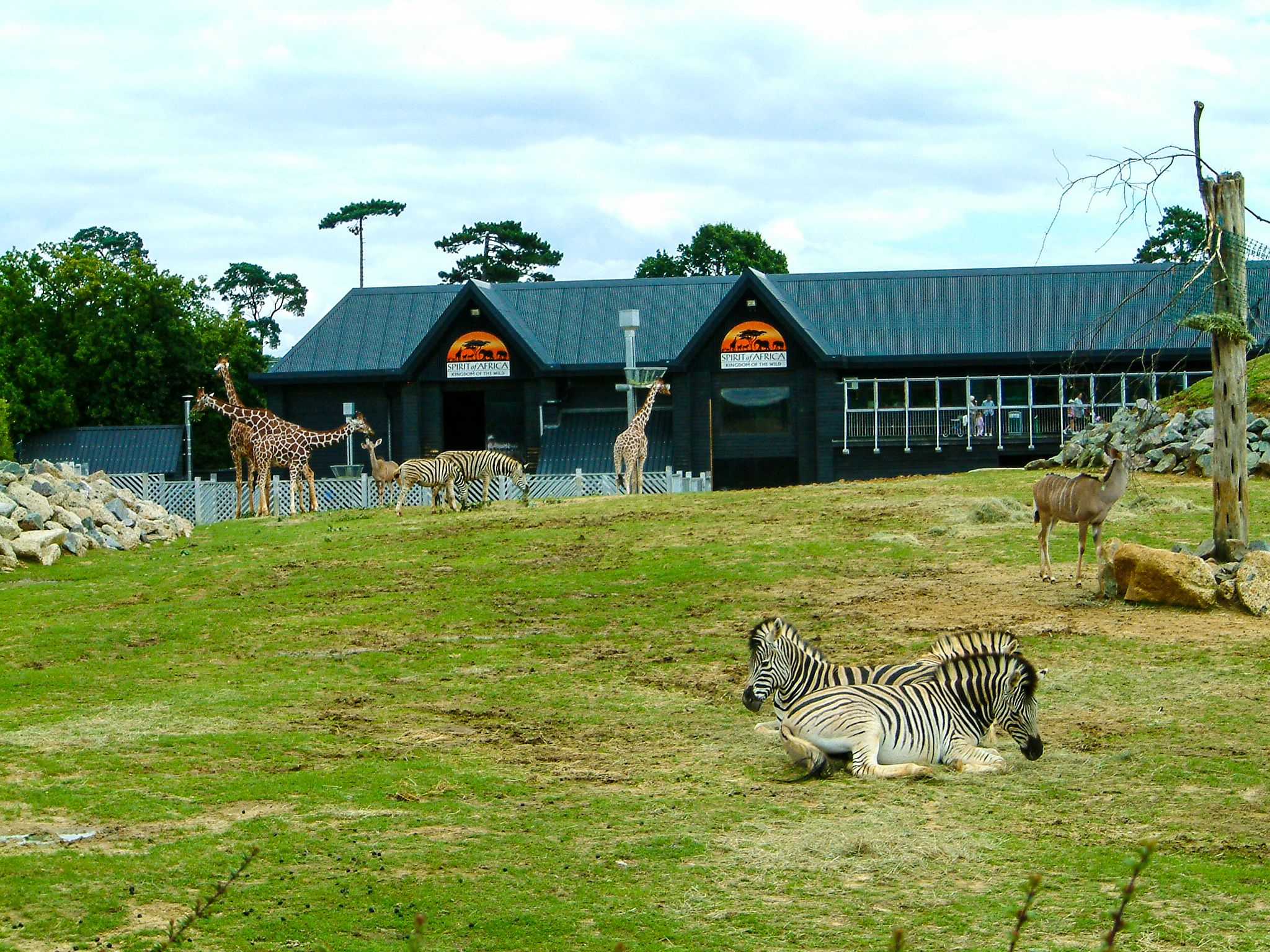
Spirit of Africa has many animals together similar to their natural environments.

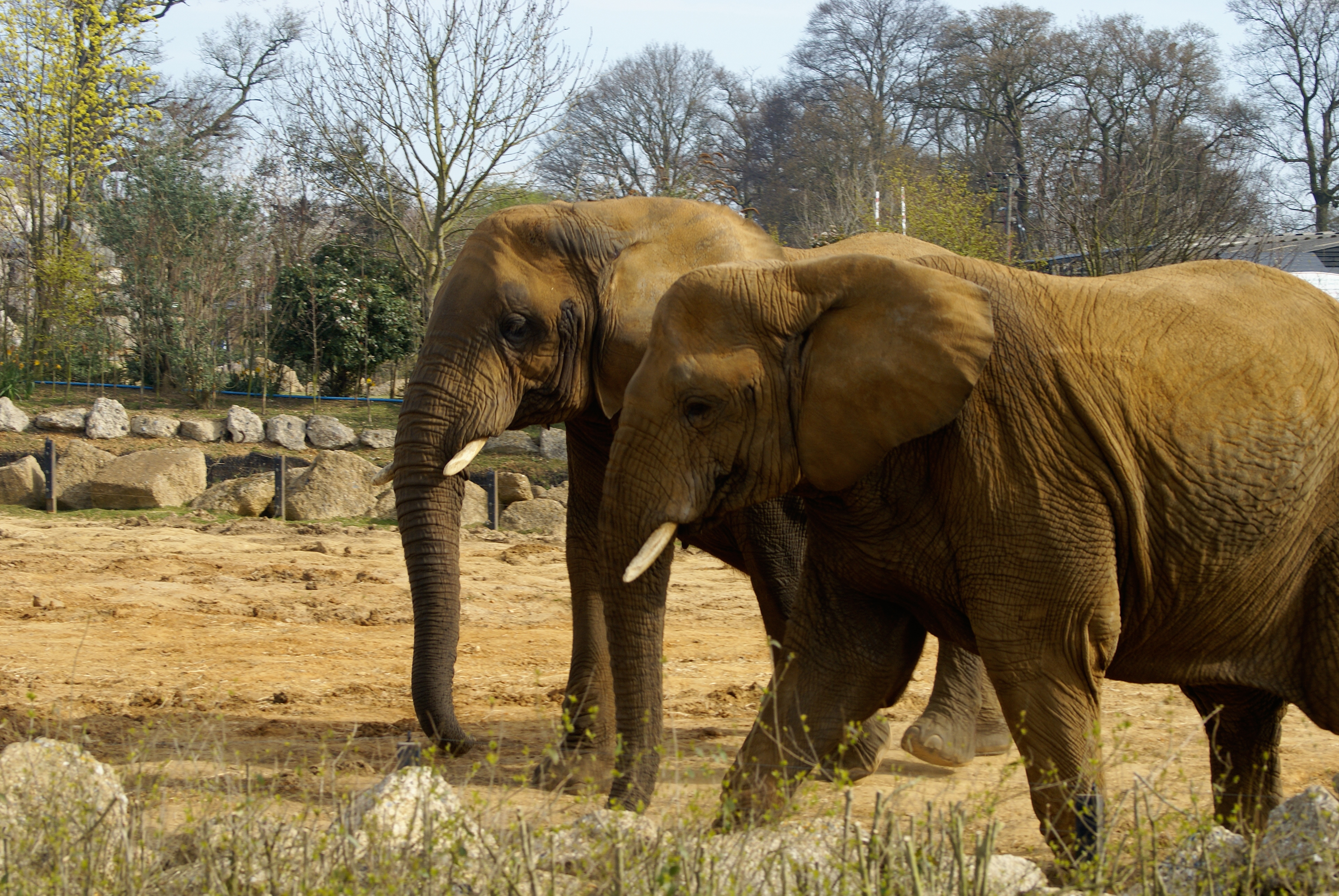
African elephants

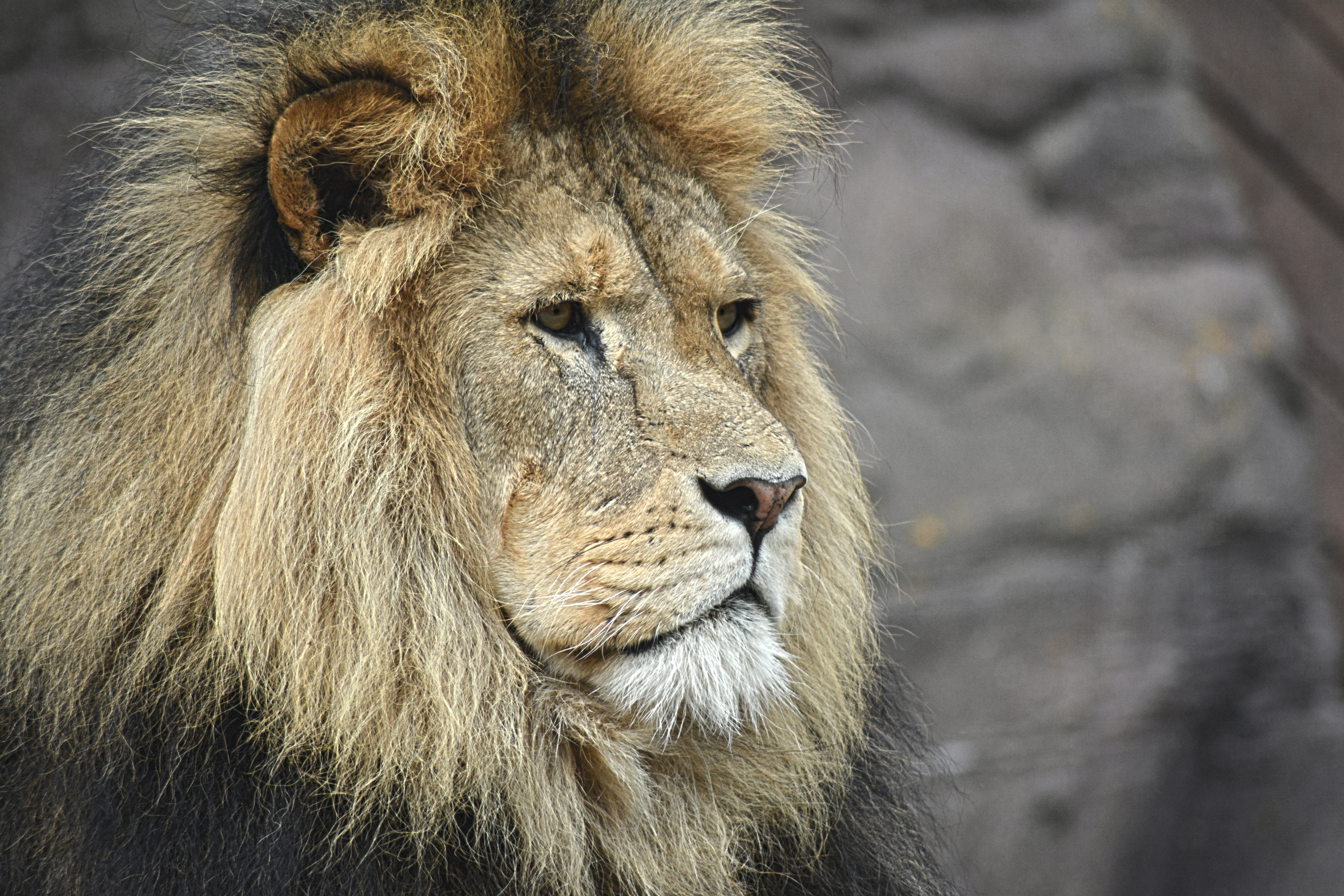
Lion

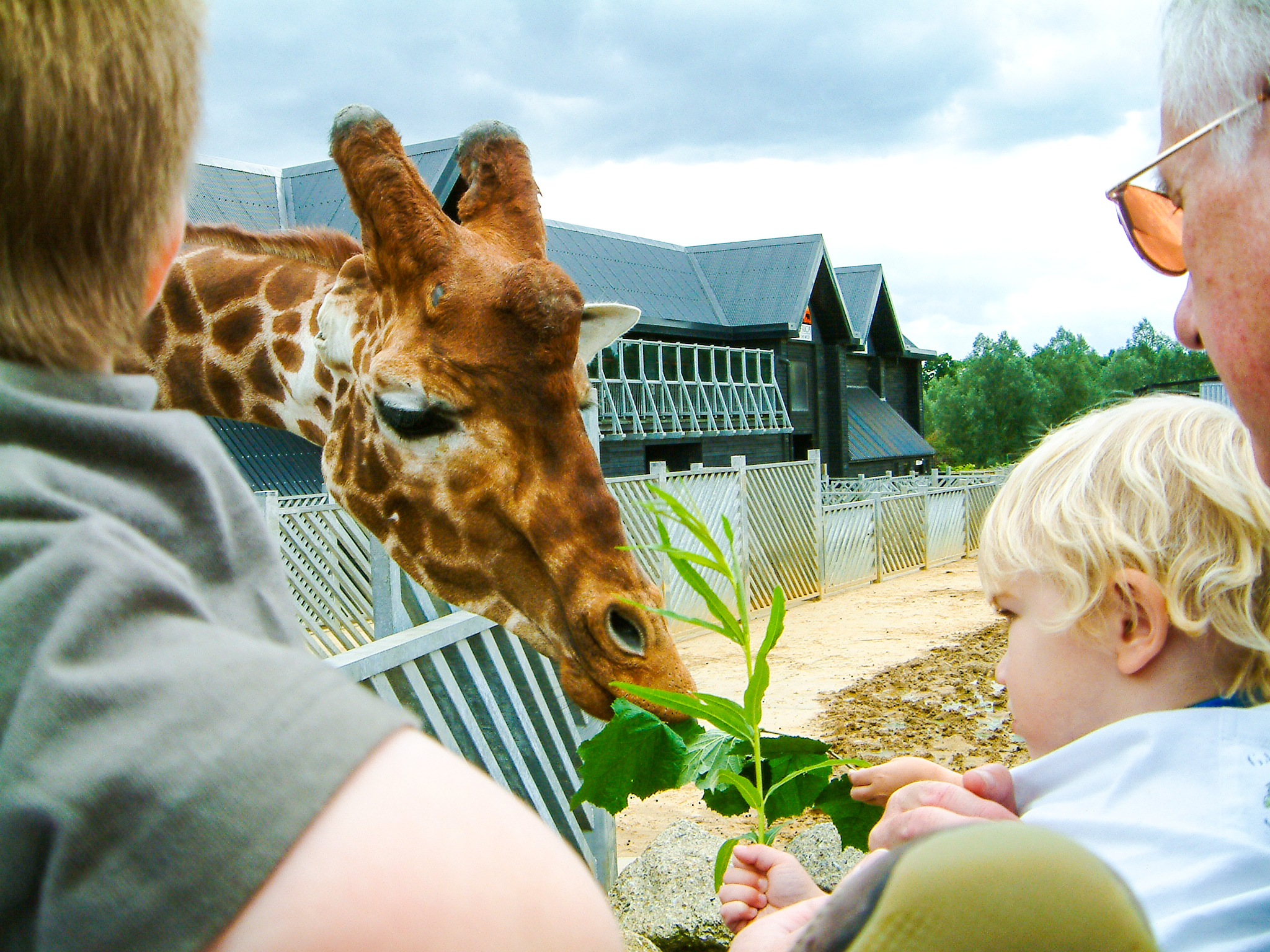
The giraffe feeding area is a popular area of the zoo.

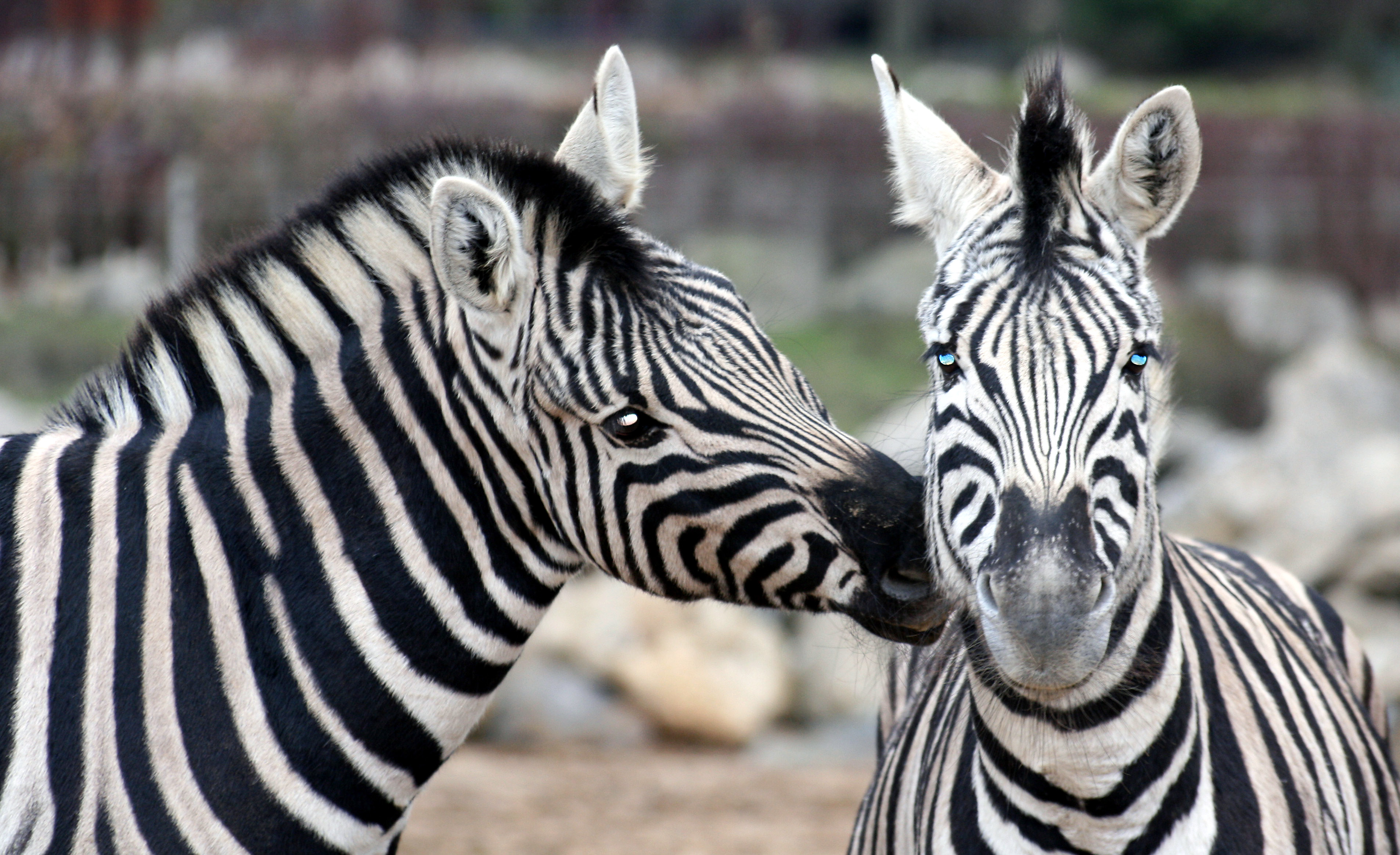
Zebras

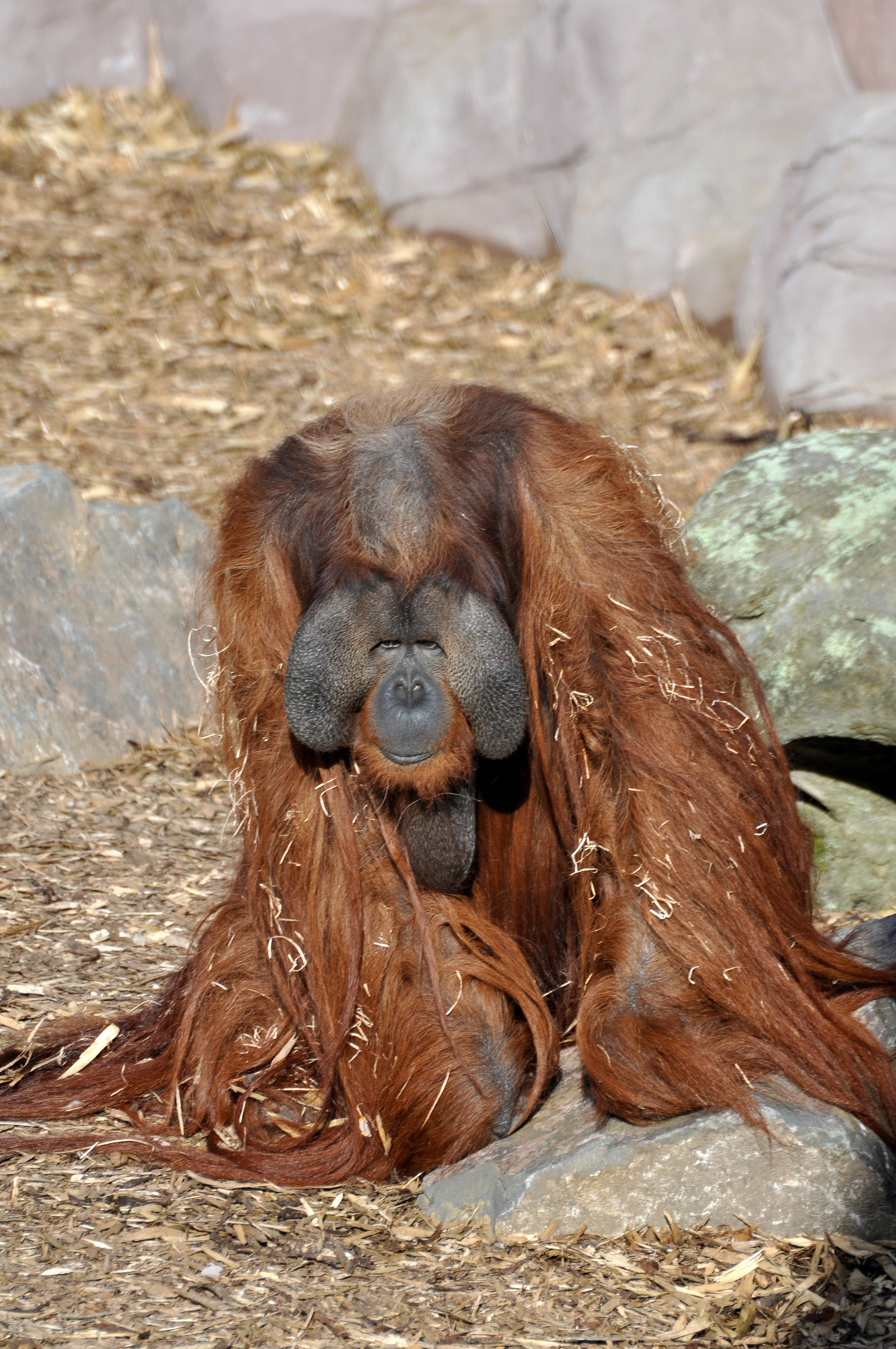
Orangutan

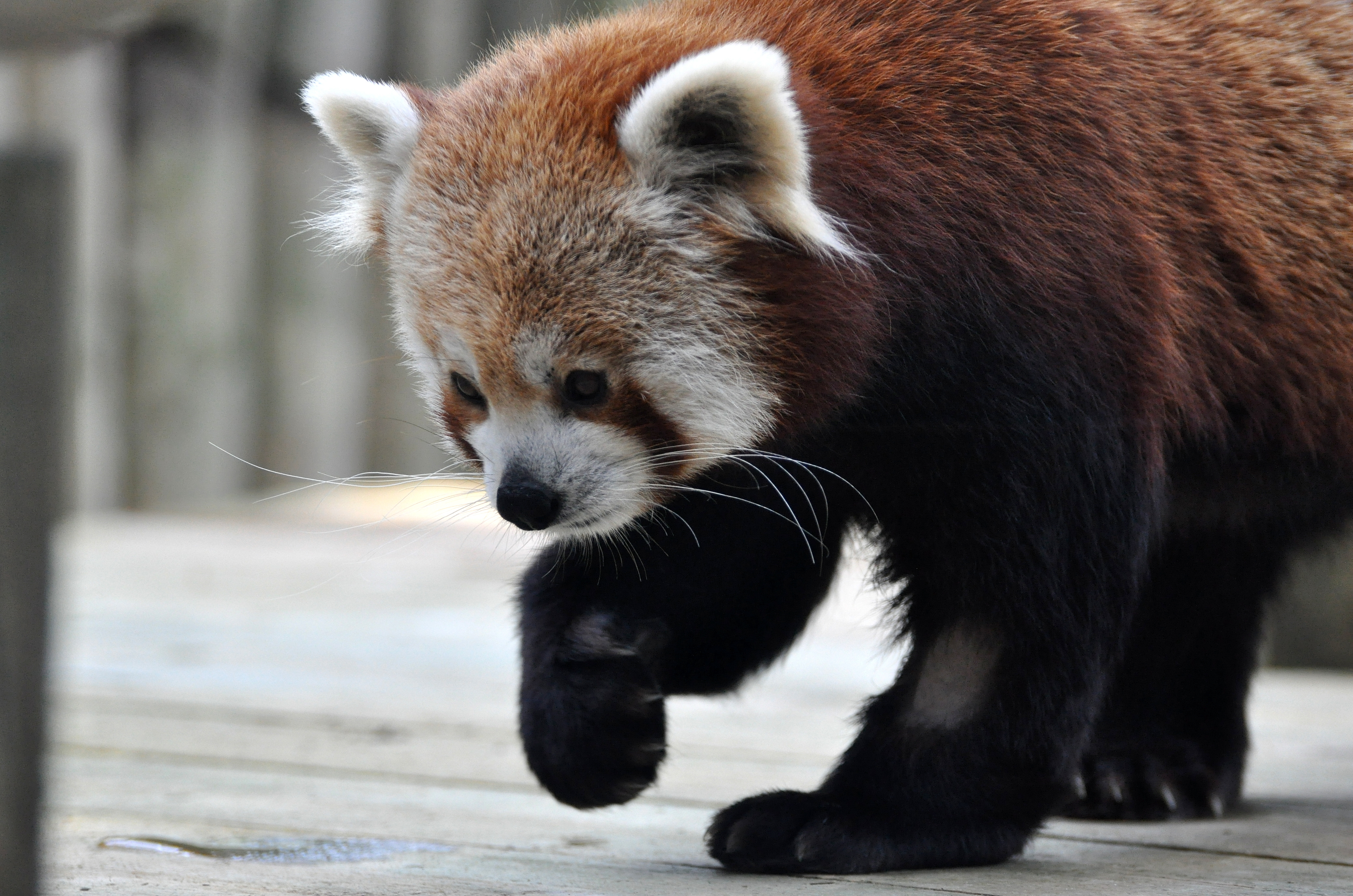
Red panda (Ailurus fulgens).

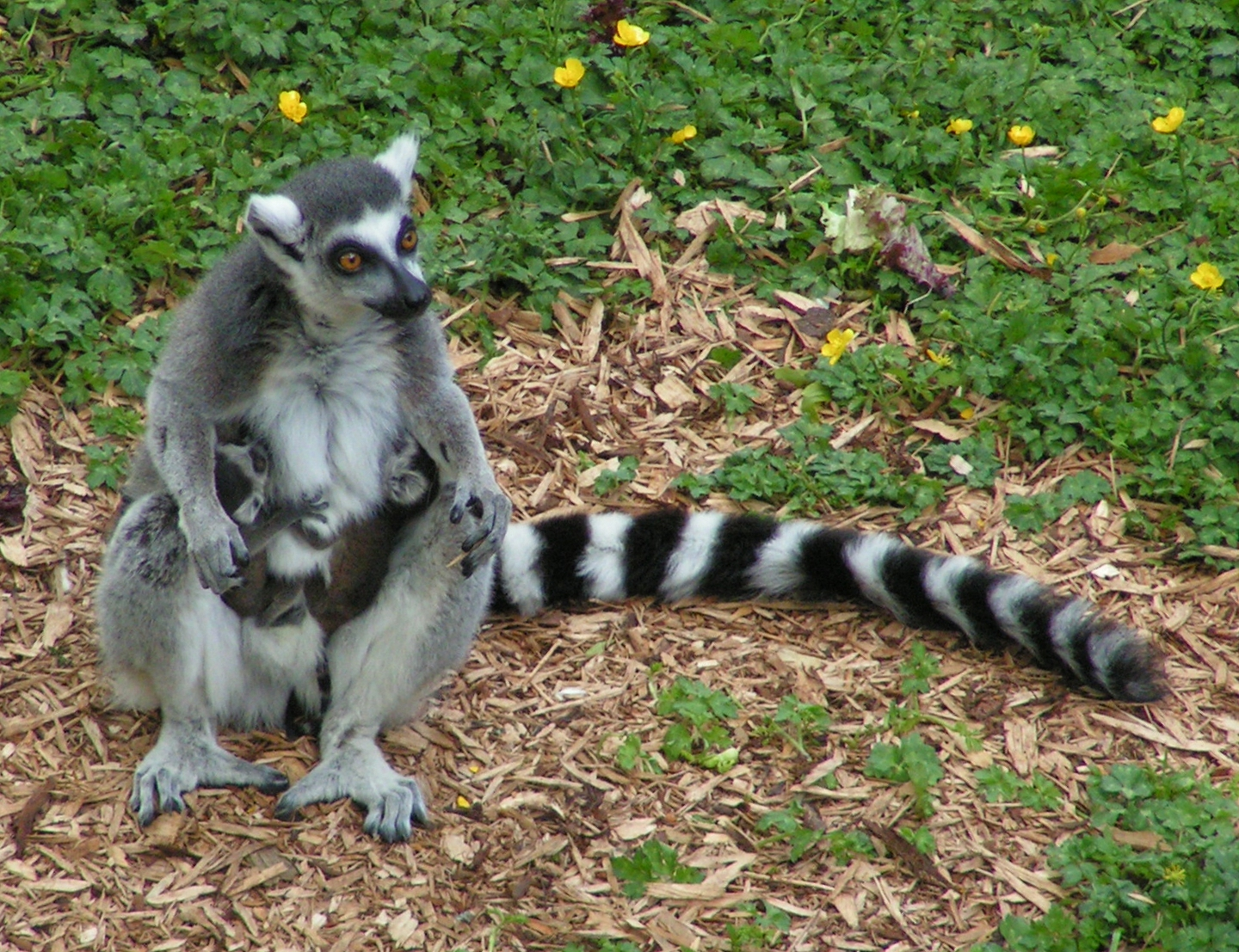
A mother ring-tailed lemur with day-old twins.

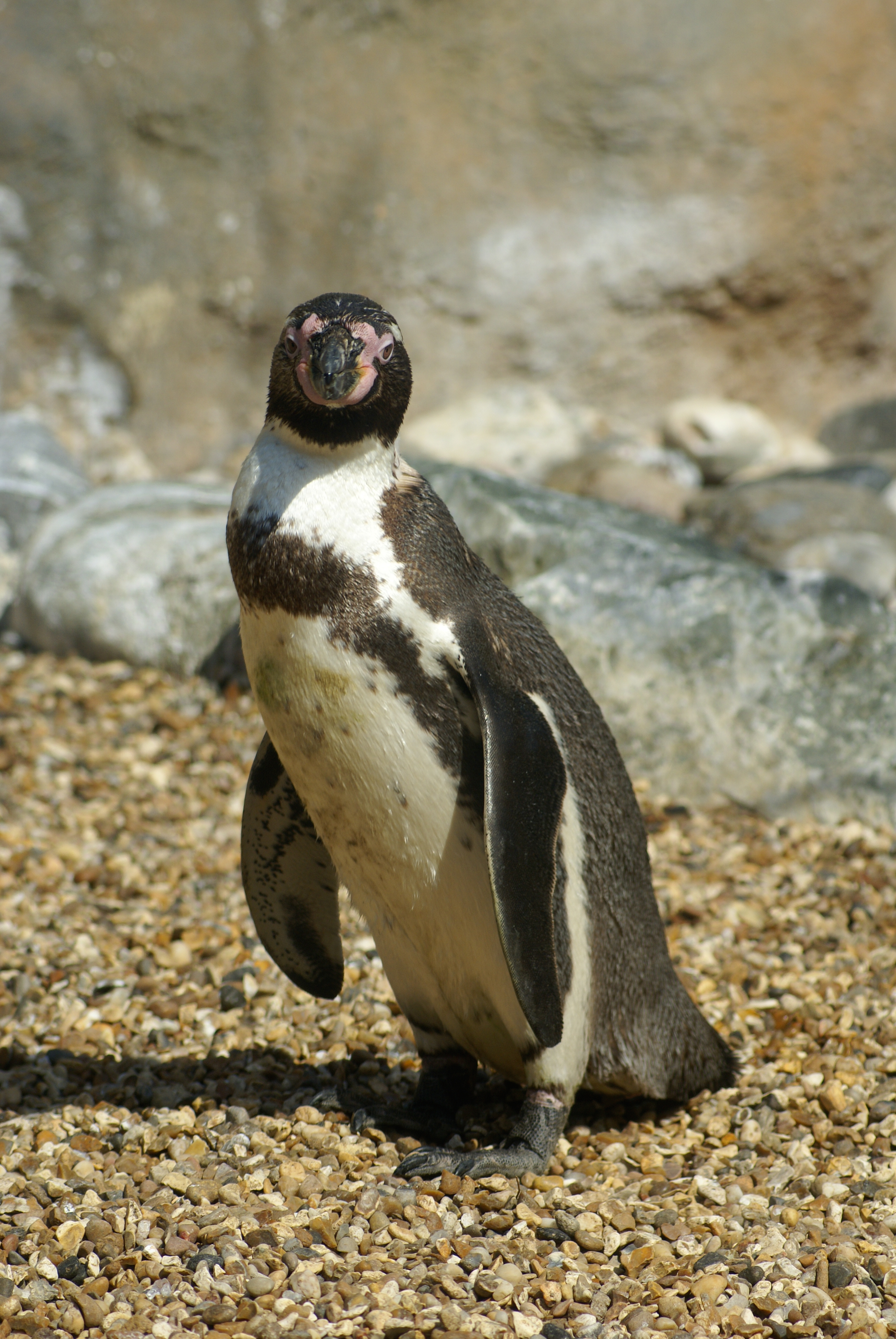
Humboldt penguin (Spheniscus humboldti).

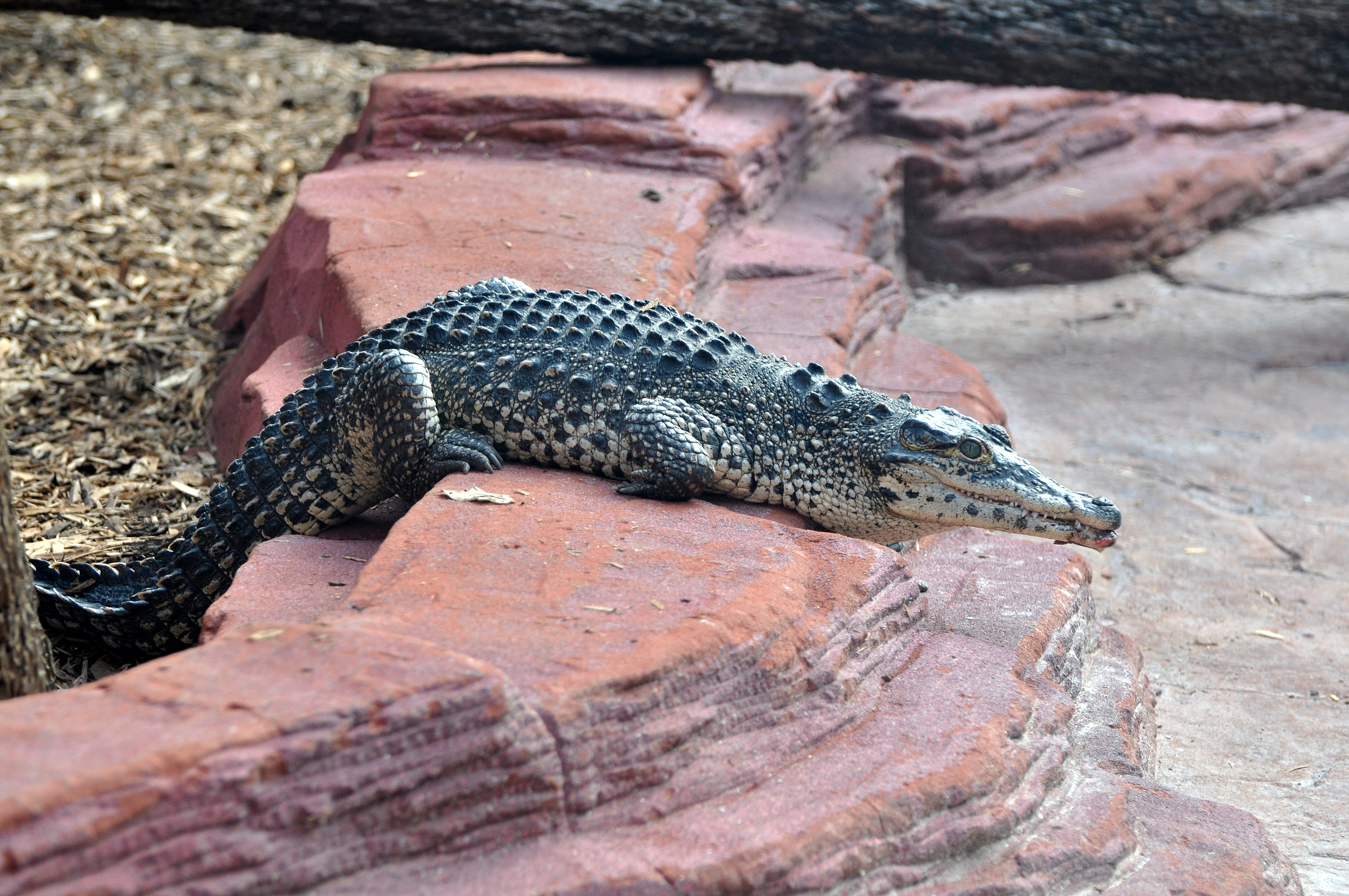
Crocodile.

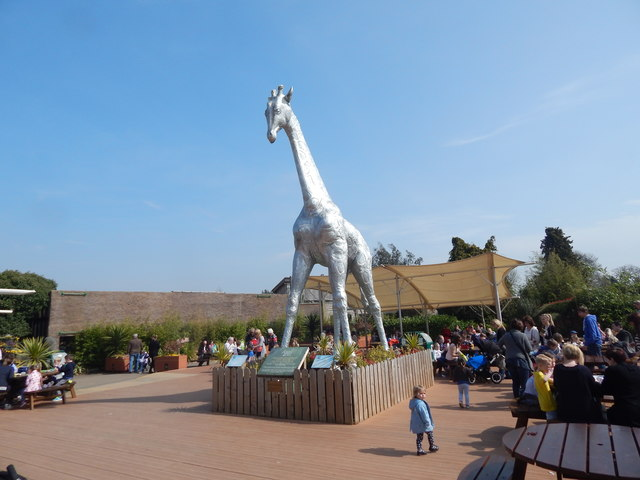
One of the pieces of artwork throughout the zoo.

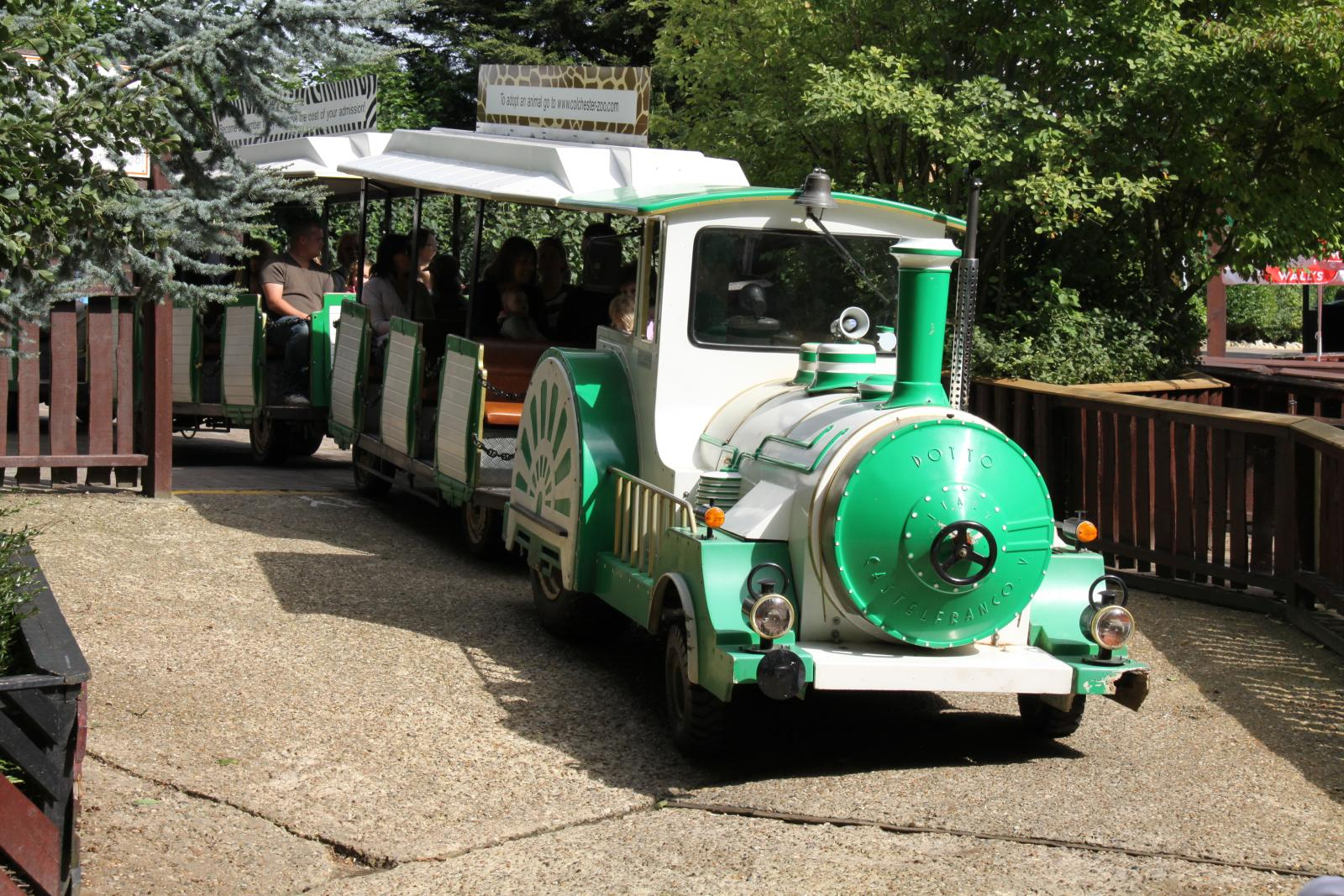
Tanganyika Road Train

== Conservation and research ==
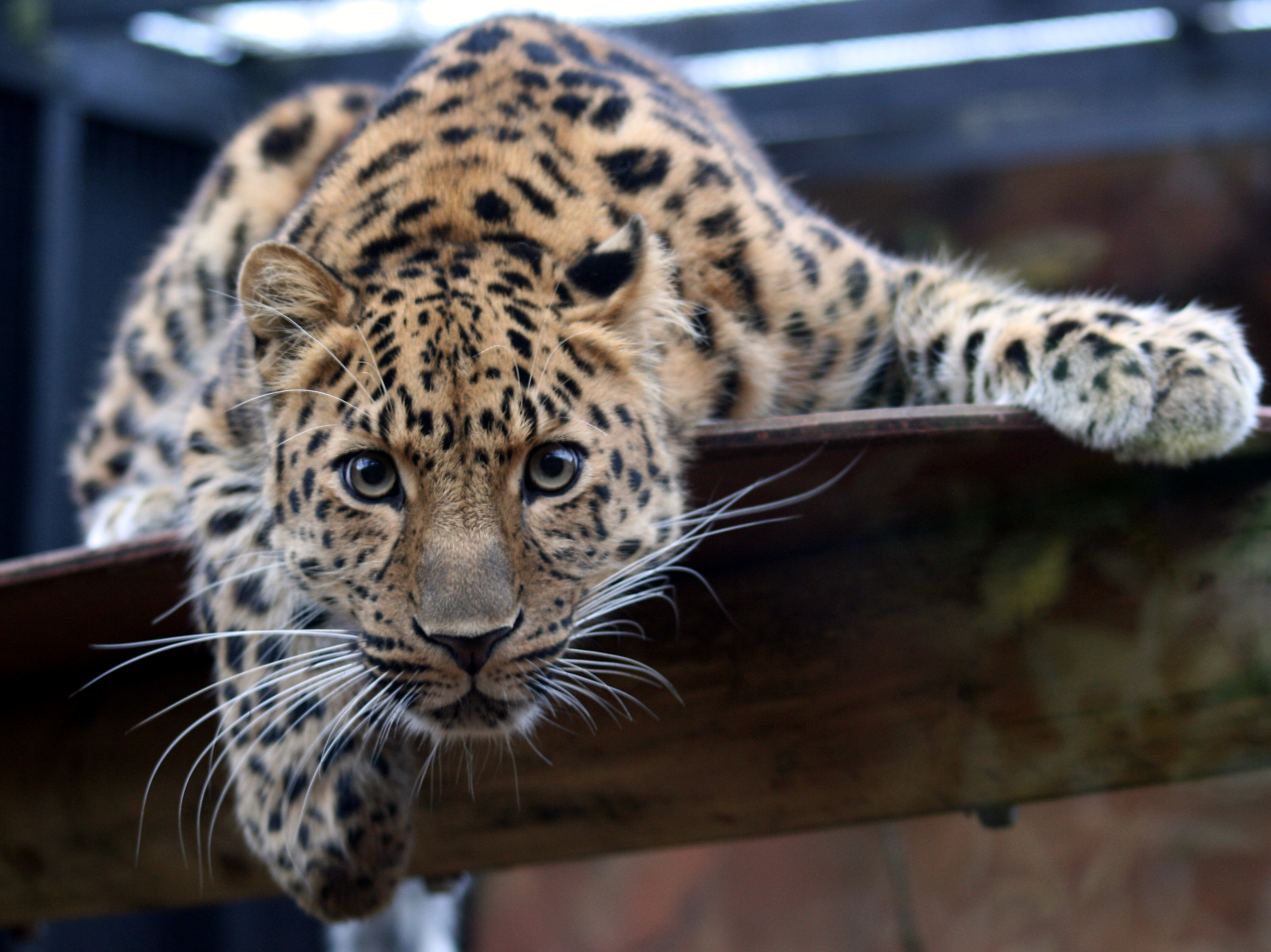
Heart murmurs of Amur leopards (Panthera pardus orientalis) is one area of research studied at the zoo.

The zoo has its own charity Action for the Wild to assist projects worldwide. The provides both financial and technical assistance, and aims to raise awareness among local people in community conservation programmes, as well as supporting conservation research around the world.

Since 2005, Action for the Wild has been working to set up the 6,000 hectare UmPhafa Private Nature Reserve in KwaZulu Natal, South Africa. Working to rehabilitate the land which was previously managed as separate cattle farms, to return it to a healthy state and to release native animal species back onto the reserve. Many species have been released; these species include zebra, nyala, giraffe, red hartebeest, blesbok, waterbuck, common reedbuck, blue wildebeest and ostrich.

== Notable former exhibits ==
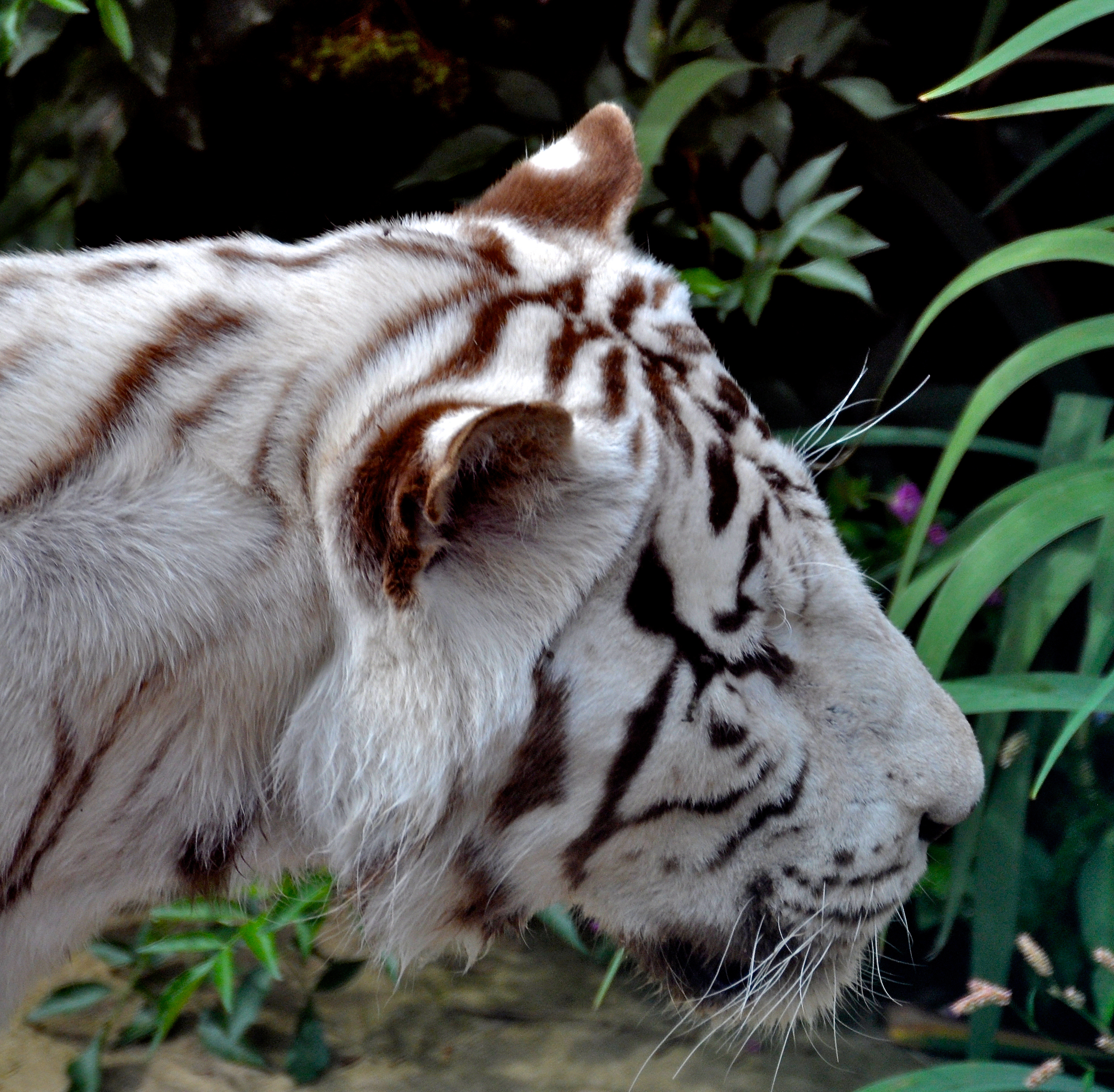
White tiger.

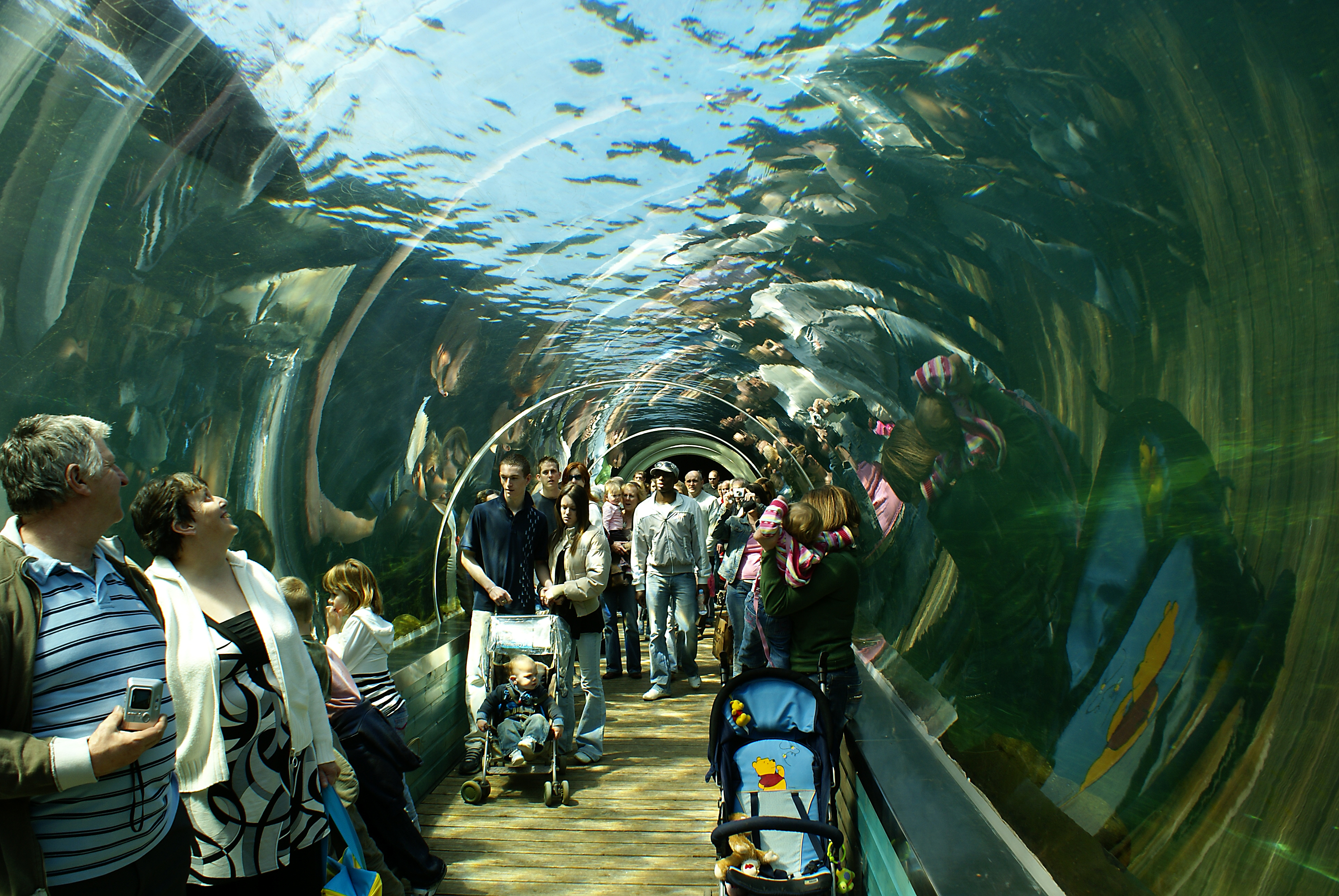
Tunnel through the Playa Patagonia with views of the sea lions in their pool.

- White Tiger Valley: This exhibit used to house Sasha, the zoo's well-known and loved white tiger. Sasha died on 15 December 2010 aged 15. The exhibit underwent extensive work, and re-opened as Lost Madagascar at Easter 2012.
- Hornbill Hill: Hornbill Hill was a steep and narrow pathway that featured enclosures for Waldrapp ibis, southern ground hornbill, black hornbill, red-billed blue magpie and at the top of the hill there is an enclosure that has previously held snow leopard, fossa, giant anteater and various New World monkeys and an African aviary that normally holds purple gallinule, hamerkop, Von der Decken's hornbill and curlew. There was also a small hidden enclosure for Geoffroy's cat. The Hornbill Hill aviaries, Geoffroy's cat enclosure and part of the Medellin Monkeys exhibit have all been demolished to make way for the new sun bear enclosure.
- Zedonk: Kingdom of the Wild was a Zedonk enclosure before being redeveloped to house Amur Tigers. the last Zedonk Shadow died in April 2009.
- Macaw: The zoo had Macaws near the entrance of the zoo, the two species were Scarlet Macaw and Blue-and-yellow macaw.
- Bird Show: The bird show stopped.running and replaced with the dinosaur realm. On two separate occasions birds flew into the lion enclosure and were killed by lions. One was an Barn Owl named Ash and the other was an Eurasian Griffon Vulture named Yatsey.
- Wallaby Walkout: The Wallaby Walkout was replaced with a goat walk with Pygmy Goats.
- Woolly Mammoth interactive display: In July 2016, the zoo opened a new augmented reality display that gives its visitors the chance to walk with digitally recreated woolly mammoths. The attraction is located inside the elephant house and is believed to be the first of its kind in a UK zoo. In 2021 it was replaced with an interactive drawing machine and a sandpit.
- Penguin Shores: Penguin shores was emptied in 2019 it was the original home to the Humboldt penguins, it also housed White-throated Toucan, Madagascar Tree Boa and Red-footed Tortoise.
- Playa Patagonia: Opened in August 2003, Playa Patagonia was home to an all-female group of five South American sea lions named Atlanta, Milan, Winnipeg, Paris and Sydney. The enclosure featured the largest straight underwater tunnel in Europe, holding 500,000 gallons of water and with glass that is 10 millimetres thick. The last sea lions died in 2026 and is currently (as of August 2026) under refurbishment.
- Lion Rock: Opened in April 2004, Lion Rock housed African Lions. The indoor area of Lion Rock features an enclosure housing fennec foxes. The main enclosure is housing a cheetah since the death of the last Lion in 2026. As of September 2026 it’s being refurbished into a new baboon enclosure so vultures can be moved into the current baboon enclosure to allow for expansion to Kingdom of the Wild. The fennec foxes will be moved to the Edge of Africa.

== Future plans ==
in 2008 the zoo anounced plans to build a brand new tropical walk-through exhibit which would have brought over seven new species to Colchester Zoo, including a brand new species of crocodile. The exhibit would have been spread over two floors and would incorporate an underwater viewing tunnel in which visitors could have been able to see crocodiles swim and feed above their heads, before coming out to see them basking around their outdoor pool on their heated rocks through three large glass windows. the contrustion of the exhibit was planned to begin in autumn of 2008 and be finished by late 2010. it is likely this exhibit has been likely canceleld as of 2026 as there has been no mention of it for future plans.

The zoo is currently renovating an enclosure for its pride of lions. The next project will be to refurbish the hippo enclosure.

On 12 April 2023, the zoo announced a new master plan. In January 2025, the zoo became owned by a newly formed charitable trust known as Colchester Zoological Society. The zoo will also receive a large expansion, with new enclosures for current species such as the elephants, lions, orangutans, gelada baboons, vultures and flamingos, together with new buildings and species including western lowland gorillas, bonobos, okapi, hippopotamus, a butterfly house and a nocturnal house.

== Cultural references ==
=== On television ===
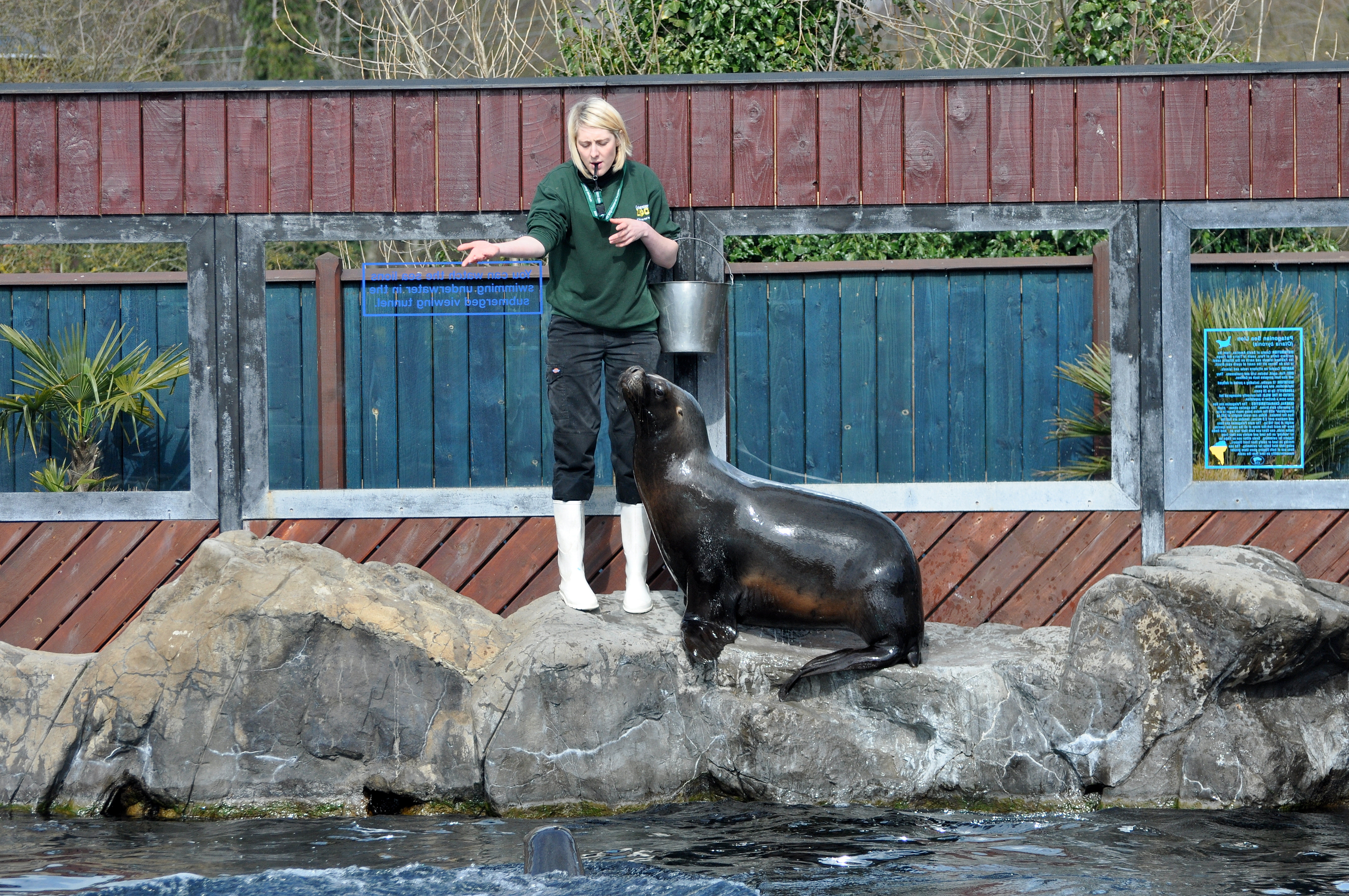
Zookeeper Hayley was one of the many zookeepers featured in the television series Zoo Days.

The third series of the Channel 5 show Zoo Days came from Colchester Zoo. This series was presented by former Blue Peter star Konnie Huq, and began transmission on 9 June 2008 and ran for 4 weeks.

=== In books ===
In May 2013 a book called The History of Colchester Zoo was published. It was written by S.C.Kershaw.

=== On radio ===
The zoo's history, and various incidents of animals escaping, were featured in the BBC Radio 4 series Mark Steel's in Town, first broadcast in September 2016.

== Awards ==
In 2024 the zoo won the Accessible and Inclusive Tourism award at the East of England Tourism Awards.
