= Birch, Essex =

Village in Essex, England

Coordinates: 51.8458°N 0.8215°E

Birch
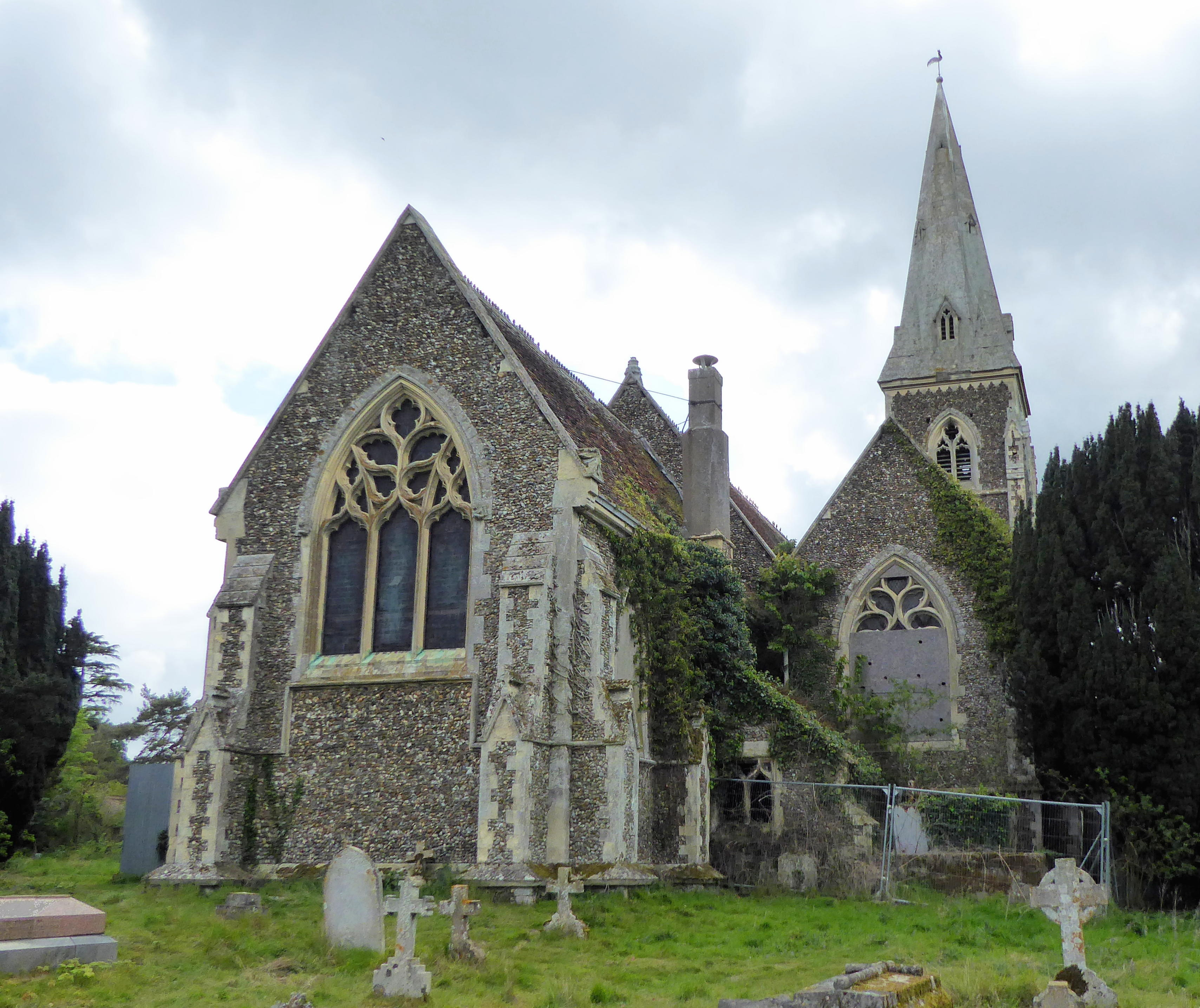
- The Church of St Peter and St Paul in 2017

- Location within Essex
- Population: 880 (Parish, 2021)
- OS grid reference: TL944201
- Civil parish: Birch
- District: City of Colchester
- Shire county: Essex
- Region: East
- Country: England
- Sovereign state: United Kingdom
- Post town: COLCHESTER
- Postcode district: CO2
- Dialling code: 01206
- Police: Essex
- Fire: Essex
- Ambulance: East of England
- UK Parliament: Witham

Birch is a village and civil parish in the City of Colchester district of Essex, England. It is located approximately 5 miles (8 km) south-west of Colchester and 17 miles (27 km) north-east of the county town of Chelmsford. The village is in the parliamentary constituency of North Essex. There is a parish council.

The parish incorporates the hamlet of Heckfordbridge. At the 2021 census the parish had a population of 880. The population had been 817 in 2001 and 873 in 2011.

== History ==
Birch was historically two ancient parishes: "Great Birch" to the west covering the area now known as Birch village and Birch Green, and "Little Birch" covering the estate of Birch Hall to the east. St Mary's Church at Little Birch dated back to at least the 13th century, but had become ruinous by the 18th century. The two parishes were jointly administering civil functions under the poor laws by the early 19th century, and they were formally united into a single parish for ecclesiastical purposes as well in 1816. St Peter and St Paul's Church was completed in 1850 on the site of the medieval parish church of Great Birch. Designed by Samuel Sanders Teulon, it is a Grade II listed building.

The 1850 church closed in 1990 and has since become derelict. In 2023 it was threatened with demolition. As at 2026 the building still stands and efforts are underway to find a new use for the building. 'Birch InSpire', campaigners working to save the church from demolition, have secured a grant of £300,000 from the Diocese of Chelmsford for the project.

== Governance ==
Birch forms part of the electoral ward called Birch and Winstree. The population of this ward at the 2011 Census was 5,651.
