= Heath Park (ward) =

Former electoral ward of the London Borough of Havering, England

- Former electoral ward for the Havering London Borough Council
- Heath Park ward boundaries from 1978 to 2002
- Borough: Havering
- County: Greater London
- Electorate: 6,563 (1998)
- Major settlements: Heath Park

Former electoral ward
- Created: 1965
- Abolished: 2002
- Councillors: 1965–1978: 3; 1978–2002: 2
- ONS code: 02BBFP

Heath Park was an electoral ward in the London Borough of Havering from 1965 to 2002. The ward was first used in the 1964 elections and last used in the 1998 elections. It covered the Heath Park area. There was a revision of ward boundaries in 1978. It returned three councillors to Havering London Borough Council until 1978 and then two councillors.

== 1978–2002 Havering council elections ==
There was a revision of ward boundaries in Havering in 1978.

=== 1998 election ===
The election on 7 May 1998 took place on the same day as the 1998 Greater London Authority referendum.

1998 Havering London Borough Council election: Heath Park (2)
Party	Candidate	Votes	%	±%
Conservative	Eric Munday	1,270		
Conservative	Michael White	1,212		
Labour	John McCole	701		
Labour	Richard Packer	646		
Liberal Democrats	Caroline Turner	279		
Liberal Democrats	Madge Mulliner	237		
Turnout				
Conservative hold		Swing		
Conservative hold		Swing		

=== 1994 election ===
The election took place on 5 May 1994.

1994 Havering London Borough Council election: Heath Park (2)
Party	Candidate	Votes	%	±%
Conservative	Mary Edwards	1,384	47.16	
Conservative	Eric Munday	1,288		
Labour	John McCole	928	32.33	
Labour	Iain Stanford	903		
Liberal Democrats	Caroline Turner	581	20.51	
Registered electors		6,506		
Turnout		2,823	43.39	
Rejected ballots		4	0.14	
Conservative hold		Swing		
Conservative hold		Swing		

=== 1990 election ===
The election took place on 3 May 1990.

1990 Havering London Borough Council election: Heath Park (2)
Party	Candidate	Votes	%	±%
Conservative	Mary Edwards	1,767	60.68	
Conservative	Eric Munday	1,721		
Labour	Diane Tomlinson	1,173	39.32	
Labour Co-op	Jeannette Bowyer	1,086		
Registered electors		6,565		
Turnout		3,078	46.88	
Rejected ballots		18	0.58	
Conservative hold		Swing		
Conservative hold		Swing		

=== 1986 election ===
The election took place on 8 May 1986.

1986 Havering London Borough Council election: Heath Park (2)
Party	Candidate	Votes	%	±%
Conservative	Mary Edwards	1,347		
Conservative	Eric Munday	1,330		
Labour	Jeannette Bowyer	552		
Labour	Robert Tomlinson	530		
Alliance	Susan Brewington	432		
Alliance	Geoffrey Howard	421		
Green	Alan Burgess	122		
Green	Diane Burgess	119		
Turnout				
Conservative hold		Swing		
Conservative hold		Swing		

=== 1983 by-election ===
The by-election took place on 10 November 1983, following the death of William Smith.

1983 Heath Park by-election
Party	Candidate	Votes	%	±%
Conservative	Mary Edwards	977		
Alliance	Peter Shave	290		
Labour	Joseph Moore	248		
Ecology	Diana Burgess	83		
Turnout				
Conservative hold		Swing		

=== 1982 election ===
The election took place on 6 May 1982.

1982 Havering London Borough Council election: Heath Park (2)
Party	Candidate	Votes	%	±%
Conservative	William Smith	1,766		
Conservative	Eric Munday	1,731		
Alliance	Susan Brewington	736		
Alliance	John Bates	712		
Labour	John Bowyer	363		
Labour	Jeanette Bowyer	354		
Turnout				
Conservative hold		Swing		
Conservative hold		Swing		

=== 1978 election ===
The election took place on 4 May 1978.

1978 Havering London Borough Council election: Heath Park (2)
Party	Candidate	Votes	%	±%
Conservative	Eric Munday	1,993		
Conservative	William Smith	1,954		
Labour	Dennis Cook	575		
Labour	Pearl Saunders	566		
Liberal	Susan Brewington	219		
Turnout				
Conservative win (new seat)				
Conservative win (new seat)				

== 1964–1978 Havering council elections ==
External images
- Map showing Heath Park ward boundaries from 1965 to 1978 (north)
- Map showing Heath Park ward boundaries from 1965 to 1978 (south)

=== 1974 election ===
The election took place on 2 May 1974.

1974 Havering London Borough Council election: Heath Park (3)
Party	Candidate	Votes	%	±%
Conservative	A. Gladwin	2,593		
Conservative	L. Hutton	2,540		
Conservative	William Smith	2,471		
Liberal	K. Brewington	787		
Liberal	Susan Brewington	773		
Liberal	I. Barwin	722		
Labour	K. Dutton	695		
Labour	J. Laws	680		
Labour	D. Dattner	677		
Turnout				
Conservative hold		Swing		
Conservative hold		Swing		
Conservative hold		Swing		

=== 1971 election ===
The election took place on 13 May 1971.

1971 Havering London Borough Council election: Heath Park (3)
Party	Candidate	Votes	%	±%
Conservative	K. Brown	2,673		
Conservative	A. Gladwin	2,645		
Conservative	L. Hutton	2,641		
Labour	A. Mills	952		
Labour	H. Packham	947		
Labour	J. Smith	933		
Turnout				
Conservative hold		Swing		
Conservative hold		Swing		
Conservative hold		Swing		

=== 1970 by-election ===
The by-election took place on 4 June 1970. The by-election followed William Smith becoming an alderman on the council.

1970 Heath Park by-election
Party	Candidate	Votes	%	±%
Conservative	A. Gladwin	1,462		
Labour	R. Kilbey	339		
Turnout			17.4%	
Conservative hold		Swing		

=== 1968 election ===
The election took place on 9 May 1968.

1968 Havering London Borough Council election: Heath Park (3)
Party	Candidate	Votes	%	±%
Conservative	William Smith	3,441		
Conservative	L. Hutton	3,406		
Conservative	K. Brown	3,394		
Independent	E. Bates	557		
Labour	W. Mills	384		
Labour	J. Holt	355		
Labour	S. Horler	337		
Turnout				
Conservative hold		Swing		
Conservative hold		Swing		
Conservative hold		Swing		

=== 1964 election ===
The election took place on 7 May 1964.

1964 Havering London Borough Council election: Heath Park (3)
Party	Candidate	Votes	%	±%
Conservative	P. Allam	2,541		
Conservative	L. Hutton	2,516		
Conservative	William Smith	2,480		
Labour	Ruby Latham	757		
Labour	D. Libman	728		
Labour	M. Riordan	704		
Liberal	H. Barber	691		
Liberal	R. Smith	665		
Liberal	D. Mills	624		
Turnout		3,954	45.7	
Conservative win (new seat)				
Conservative win (new seat)				
Conservative win (new seat)				
