= Helebridge =

Hamlet in Cornwall, England

Coordinates: 50°48′18″N 4°32′01″W

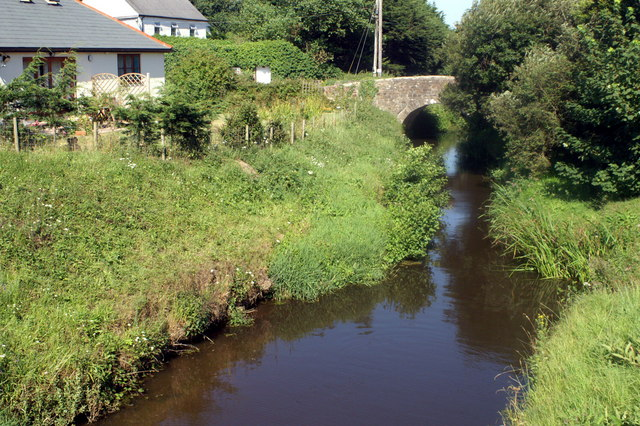
The River Neat at Helebridge

Helebridge is a hamlet west of Marhamchurch (where the 2011 census population was included ) in northeast Cornwall, England.
