= Hellesveor =

Hamlet in Cornwall, England

Coordinates: 50.207°N 5.502°W

Hellesveor: Cornish: Hellys Veur
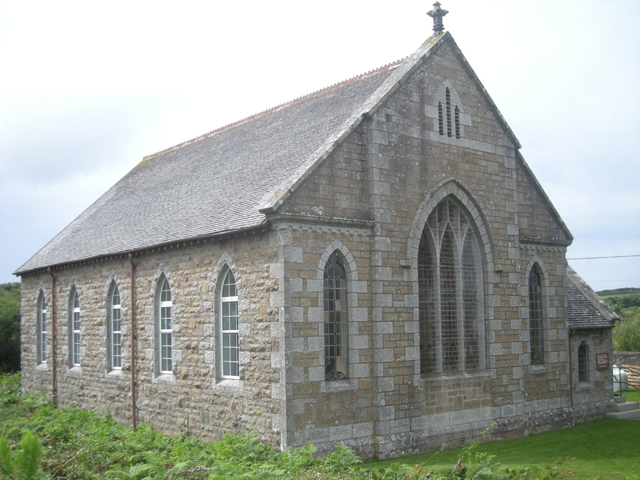
- Hellesveor Methodist Church

- Location within Cornwall
- OS grid reference: SW502400
- Civil parish: St Ives
- Unitary authority: Cornwall
- Ceremonial county: Cornwall
- Region: South West
- Country: England
- Sovereign state: United Kingdom
- Post town: St Ives
- Postcode district: Tr26

Hellesveor (Cornish: Hellys Veur) is a hamlet near St Ives (where the 2011 census population was included) in west Cornwall, England.
