= Heckfordbridge =

Hamlet in Essex, England

Coordinates: 51.860°N 0.824°E

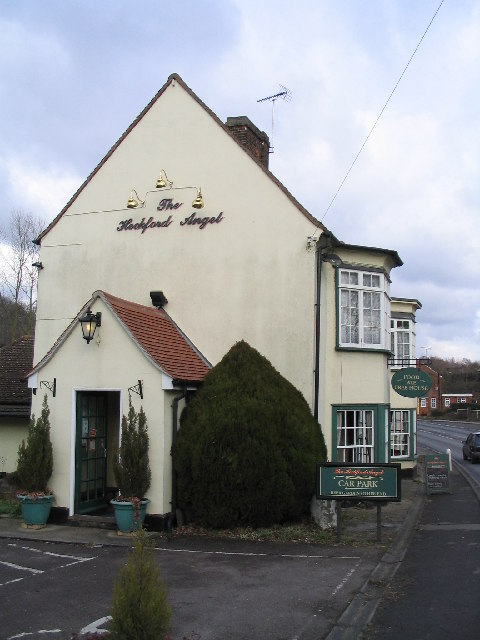
- The Heckford Angel

- Location within Essex
- Civil parish: Birch
- District: Colchester
- Shire county: Essex
- Region: East
- Country: England
- Sovereign state: United Kingdom
- Post town: COLCHESTER
- Postcode district: CO3
- Police: Essex
- Fire: Essex
- Ambulance: East of England
- UK Parliament: Witham

Heckfordbridge or Heckford is a hamlet in the civil parish of Birch, in the Colchester district, in the county of Essex, England.

The settlement is on the B1022 road, between Colchester and Tiptree. near to Colchester Zoo.
