= Helsey =

Hamlet in Lincolnshire, England

Coordinates: 53.231009°N 0.273409°E

- Location within Lincolnshire
- OS grid reference: TF518728
  - London: 120 mi (190 km) S
- District: East Lindsey
- Shire county: Lincolnshire
- Region: East Midlands
- Country: England
- Sovereign state: United Kingdom
- Post town: Skegness
- Postcode district: PE24
- Police: Lincolnshire
- Fire: Lincolnshire
- Ambulance: East Midlands
- UK Parliament: Louth and Horncastle

Helsey is a hamlet in the civil parish of Mumby, and the East Lindsey district of Lincolnshire, England. It lies on the A52 1 mile (1.6 km) north-east from Hogsthorpe, 3 miles (5 km) east from Willoughby and 1 mile south from Mumby.

In 1885 Kelly's noted that Helsey was in the parish of Hogsthorpe, an agricultural area of 2,870 acres (11.6 km^{2}) supporting the production of wheat, beans and oats, and an 1881 population of 719.
