= Heath Park, Havering =

Coordinates: 51.574438°N 0.201988°E

Heath Park
- Location within Greater London
- London borough: Havering
- Ceremonial county: Greater London
- Region: London
- Country: England
- Sovereign state: United Kingdom
- Post town: ROMFORD
- Postcode district: RM1, RM2
- Dialling code: 01708
- Police: Metropolitan
- Fire: London
- Ambulance: London
- UK Parliament: Hornchurch and Upminster
- London Assembly: Havering and Redbridge

Heath Park is an area of the London Borough of Havering situated to the east of Romford. It is a largely Edwardian estate built as a result of railway expansion.

The district is located to the east of the Romford–Upminster railway line. It was built from around 1908 in the east of the parish of Romford, adjacent to Hornchurch.

The name refers to the former heath in the area, as does nearby Squirrels Heath.
