= St Mary the Virgin's Church, Arkengarthdale =

Church in Arkengarthdale, North Yorkshire, England

Coordinates: 54°25′11″N 1°59′48″W

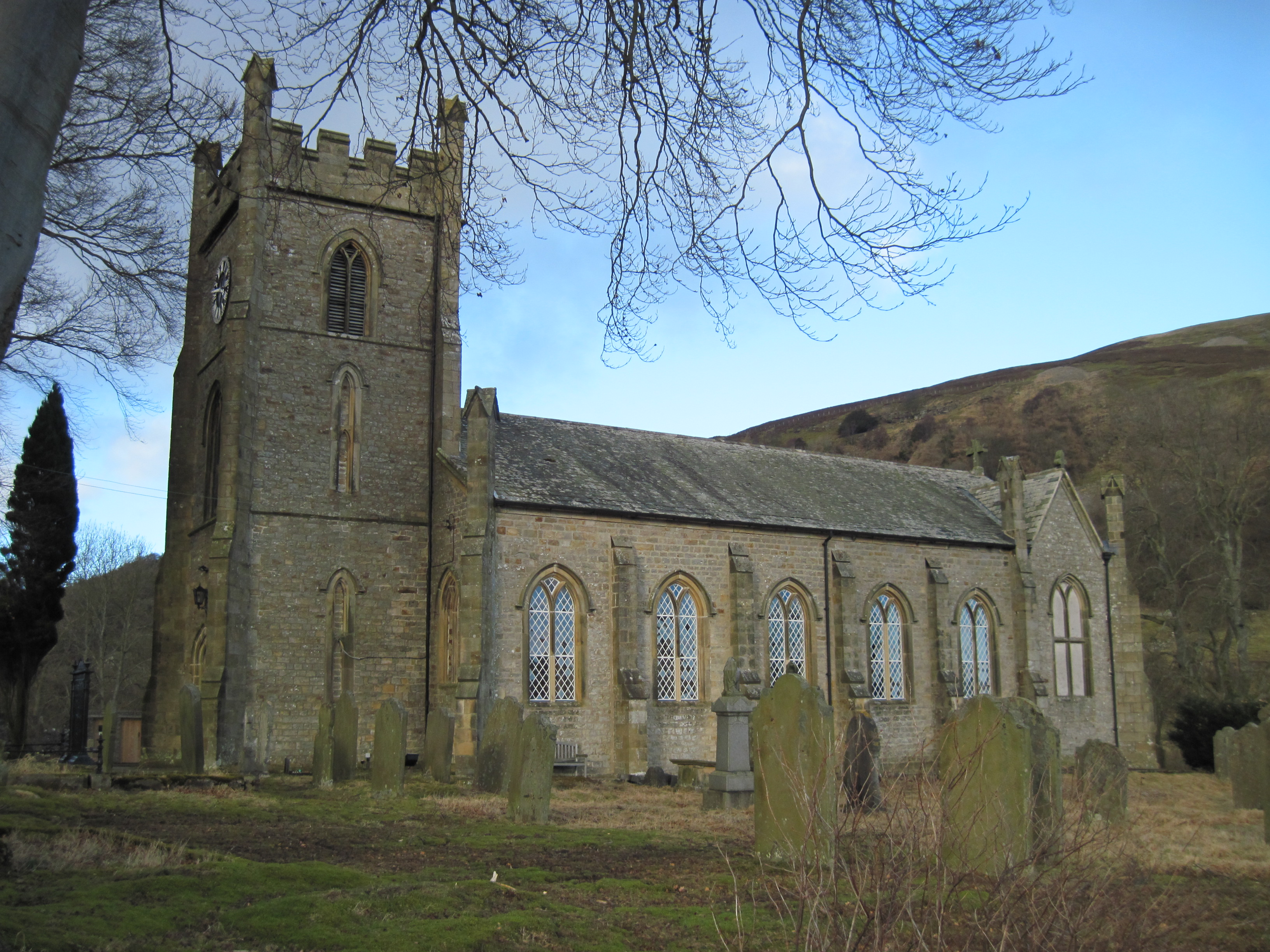
The church, in 2012

St Mary the Virgin's Church is the parish church of Arkengarthdale, a valley in North Yorkshire, in England.

There was a mediaeval church in Arkle Town in Arkengarthdale, but its foundations were undermined by the Arkle Beck, and it was pulled down in the 1810s. The replacement church, located in Langthwaite, was funded by George Brown, lord of the manor, and was completed in 1818. It shares a style with many Commissioners' churches, but was not funded by money voted by Parliament, and so is not strictly a Commissioners' church. It was Grade II listed in 1986. The church is available for champing with the Churches Conservation Trust.

The church is built of rubble, with a slate roof. It is in the Early English style, with a five-bay combined nave and chancel. There is a north vestry, and a west tower, which has three stages, with blank windows lower down, and belfrey openings at the top stage. Most of the windows have two lights and have Y-tracery, while the east window has four lights. Between each pair of windows is a thin buttress. Inside, there is a west gallery, and two fonts - one original, and one dating from 1891. The pews date from the late 19th century, while the pulpit and altar rail are original. There is a reredos and plaque made by Robert Thompson.

== See also ==
- Listed buildings in Arkengarthdale
