= Booze, North Yorkshire =

Hamlet in North Yorkshire, England

Coordinates: 54.418°N 1.978°W

Booze
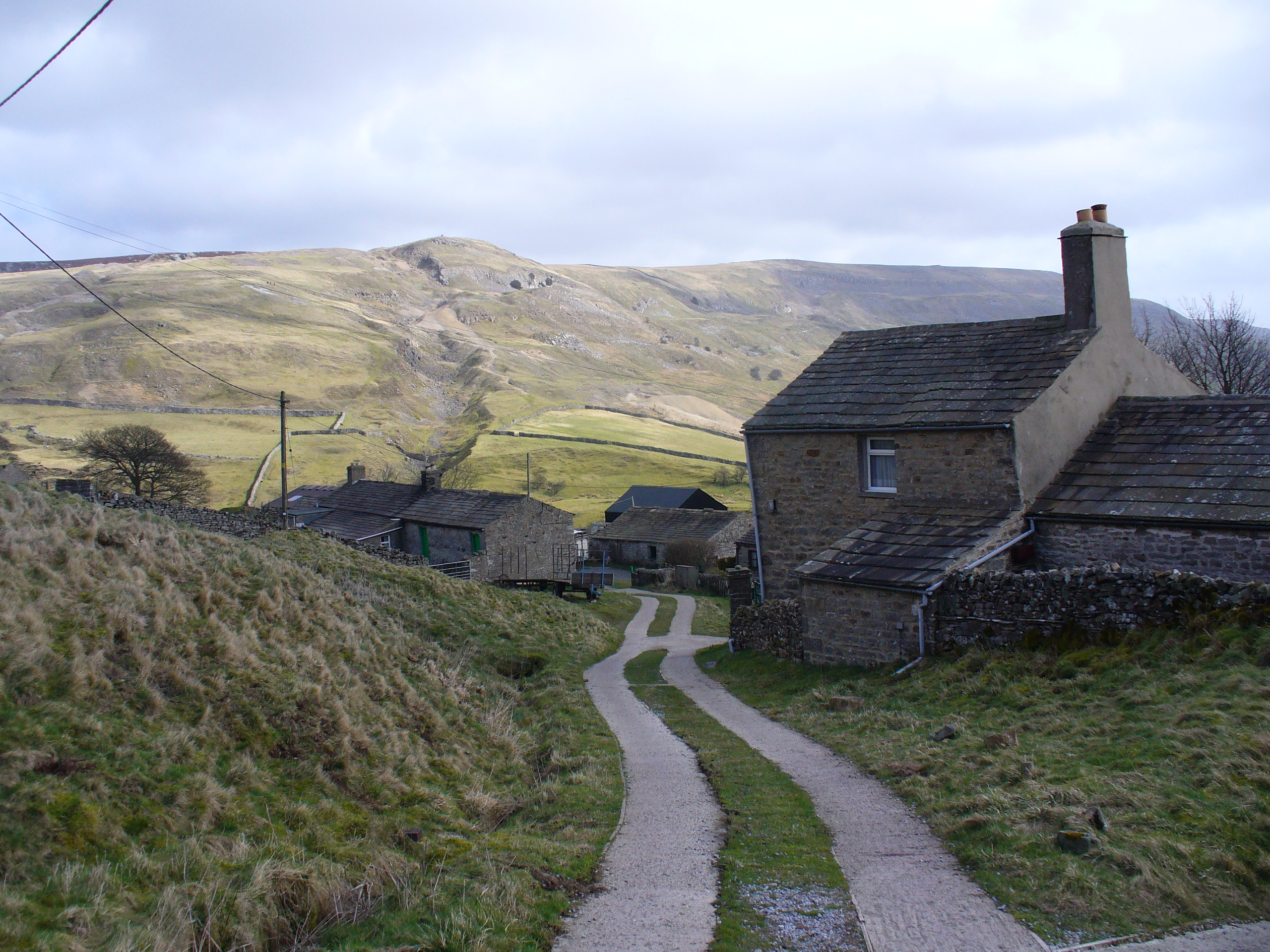
- Booze with Fremington Edge in the background

- Location within North Yorkshire
- OS grid reference: NZ015025
- Civil parish: Arkengarthdale
- Unitary authority: North Yorkshire
- Ceremonial county: North Yorkshire
- Region: Yorkshire and the Humber
- Country: England
- Sovereign state: United Kingdom
- Post town: Richmond
- Postcode district: DL11
- Police: North Yorkshire
- Fire: North Yorkshire
- Ambulance: Yorkshire
- UK Parliament: Richmond and Northallerton

Booze is a hamlet in Arkengarthdale, in North Yorkshire, England. It is about 1 mile (1.6 km) east of Langthwaite. There are 11 households in the hamlet. There is a riding school nearby.

== Name ==
The earliest record of the name is from 1473, in the form Bowehous. The name is derived from the Old English boga 'bow' and hus 'house', and thus means 'house by the bow or curve'. The reference is possibly to the curved hill above Slei Gill and Arkle Beck, on which the hamlet is situated.

== History ==
The original community depended on hill farming and mining. The hamlet overlooks Slei Gill which contains several lead mining levels. Following the collapse of the lead mining industry in North Yorkshire at the end of the 19th century one of the mines, the Booze Wood Level, continued to be used as a slate mine until the beginning of the First World War. Chert was mined on Fremington Edge, south of Booze, until the beginning of the Second World War.

The 1851 census counted 41 houses in Booze.

A local tragedy occurred during the eighteenth century when a group of miners working underground near Boldershaw blasted into an underground lake. Twenty-four miners and two pit ponies were drowned in the flood that followed. Eighteen of the dead came from Booze. The vein became known as the Water Blast Vein. Modern researchers have failed to find any record of this event in Parish records, though an accident involving the death of three miners may have been the origins of this story.

From 1974 to 2023 it was part of the district of Richmondshire, it is now administered by the unitary North Yorkshire Council.

== Access ==
The only road access to Booze is by a steep and narrow single-track road from Langthwaite. In July 2008, Royal Mail announced it was withdrawing postal services from the hamlet on health and safety grounds because access to it involves an "excessively steep" rural track. This left local families to make a one-hour round-trip into Richmond and back to collect their mail. Postal services to the hamlet were restored after North Yorkshire County Council made road improvements.
