= Arkle Beck Meadows, Whaw =

Hay meadow in North Yorkshire, England

Coordinates: 54.43232°N 2.02617°W

- Site of Special Scientific Interest
- Location of Arkle Beck Meadows, Whaw.
- Area of search: North Yorkshire
- Grid reference: NY984041
- Interest: Biological
- Area: 8.4 ha (21 acres)
- Notification date: 1986
- Location map: Natural England

Arkle Beck Meadows, Whaw (grid reference NY984041) is a 8.4 hectares (21 acres) biological Site of Special Scientific Interest (SSSI) at Whaw in Arkengarthdale in the Yorkshire Dales. The SSSI was first notified in 1986 and is due to the hay meadows which are traditionally managed by hay cropping and grazing.
