= Listed buildings in Arkengarthdale =

Arkengarthdale is a civil parish in the county of North Yorkshire, England. It contains ten listed buildings that are recorded in the National Heritage List for England. Of these, one is listed at Grade II*, the middle of the three grades, and the others are at Grade II, the lowest grade. The parish contains the village of Langthwaite and an area to the northwest along the valley of Arkle Beck. Most of the listed buildings are houses and associated structures, and the others include a former toll house, a former powder magazine, and a church and associated structures.

== Key ==
| Grade | Criteria |
|---|---|
| II* | Particularly important buildings of more than special interest |
| II | Buildings of national importance and special interest |

== Buildings ==
| Name and location | Photograph | Date | Notes | Grade |
|---|---|---|---|---|
| Plantation Houses; 54.42588°N 2.00279°W | — | Mid 18th century | A pair of houses in stone, with quoins, and a stone slate roof with stone copings and shaped kneelers. There are two storeys, and each house has two wide bays. On the front are two porches, and the windows are sashes in varying sizes. | II |
| West House and Cottage; 54.42408°N 1.99869°W | — | 18th century | The house and cottage are under one roof and are in sandstone. They have a stone slate roof with stone copings and shaped kneelers. There are two storeys, the house has three bays, and the cottage to the right has two. The house has a central doorway with a plain surround, and a sundial in a blocked window above. The windows in both parts are sashes. | II |
| Punchard Toll House; 54.44296°N 2.04374°W | | Late 18th century | At one time a toll house, and later used for other purposes, it is in stone with a stone slate roof, and has a single storey. It contains a blocked window, a doorway converted into a small window, and a blocked doorway. | II |
| C B Yard; 54.42675°N 2.00512°W | | Late 18th to early 19th century | A group of lead mine offices, cottages and stables, later all residential, in stone with stone slate roofs. There are two storeys and two ranges in an L-shaped plan. The main range contains eight houses in unequal pairs and in differing heights, and the windows are a mix of casements and sashes. The other range has two houses, former stables and outbuildings, and contain various openings. | II |
| Stable Block, West House; 54.42399°N 1.99844°W | — | Late 18th to early 19th century | A stable and coach house with a hayloft above, it is in stone with quoins, a stone slate roof, and two storeys. In the ground floor are two doorways, and a small round-arched coach opening with voussoirs, and external steps lead to an upper floor doorway, where there is also a sash window. | II |
| Old Powder Magazine; 54.42633°N 2.00367°W | | c. 1804 | The former powder magazine is in stone, with quoins, and a pyramidal stone slate roof with triangular copings and a ball finial. There is a single storey and a hexagonal plan, and a gabled porch with kneelers. On one side is an inserted sash window, and the other sides each contain a blank window with a rounded head and a projecting keystone. | II* |
| St Mary's the Virgin's Church; 54.41976°N 1.99669°W | | 1818–19 | The church is in stone with a Westmorland slate roof, and is in Early English style. It consists of a nave and a chancel under one roof, a north vestry and a west tower. The tower has three stages, a west doorway with a four-centred arch, blank lancet windows, bell openings with Y-tracery, and an embattled parapet with corner pinnacles. The windows on the sides of the church have two lights and Y-tracery, and the east window has four lights. | II |
| Gate and gate piers, St Mary's Church; 54.41976°N 1.99730°W | — | Early 19th century | Flanking the entrance to the churchyard are sandstone gate piers, each on a plinth, with a cornice and ornamental capping. Between them are gates in wrought and cast iron with spear finials, and a wrought iron overthrow with a lamp bracket. | II |
| Limekiln; 54.43565°N 2.01860°W | | Early 19th century | The limekiln is in drystone, it is built against a hillside, and has a tapering rectangular plan. The entrance has a segmental arch with voussoirs, and on the top is a circular opening. | II |
| Barningham memorial, St Mary's Church; 54.41967°N 1.99700°W | | c. 1843 | The memorial in the churchyard commemorates Thomas Barningham. It consists of a headstone in cast iron on a stepped base. It is flanked by Tuscan colonettes supporting a frieze, and has a cornice, urn finials and a pediment. The grave is surrounded by an iron rail with acanthus-ornamented balusters with urn finials on a chamfered stone plinth. | II |
