= Eskeleth =

Hamlet in North Yorkshire, England

Coordinates: 54.431°N 2.006°W

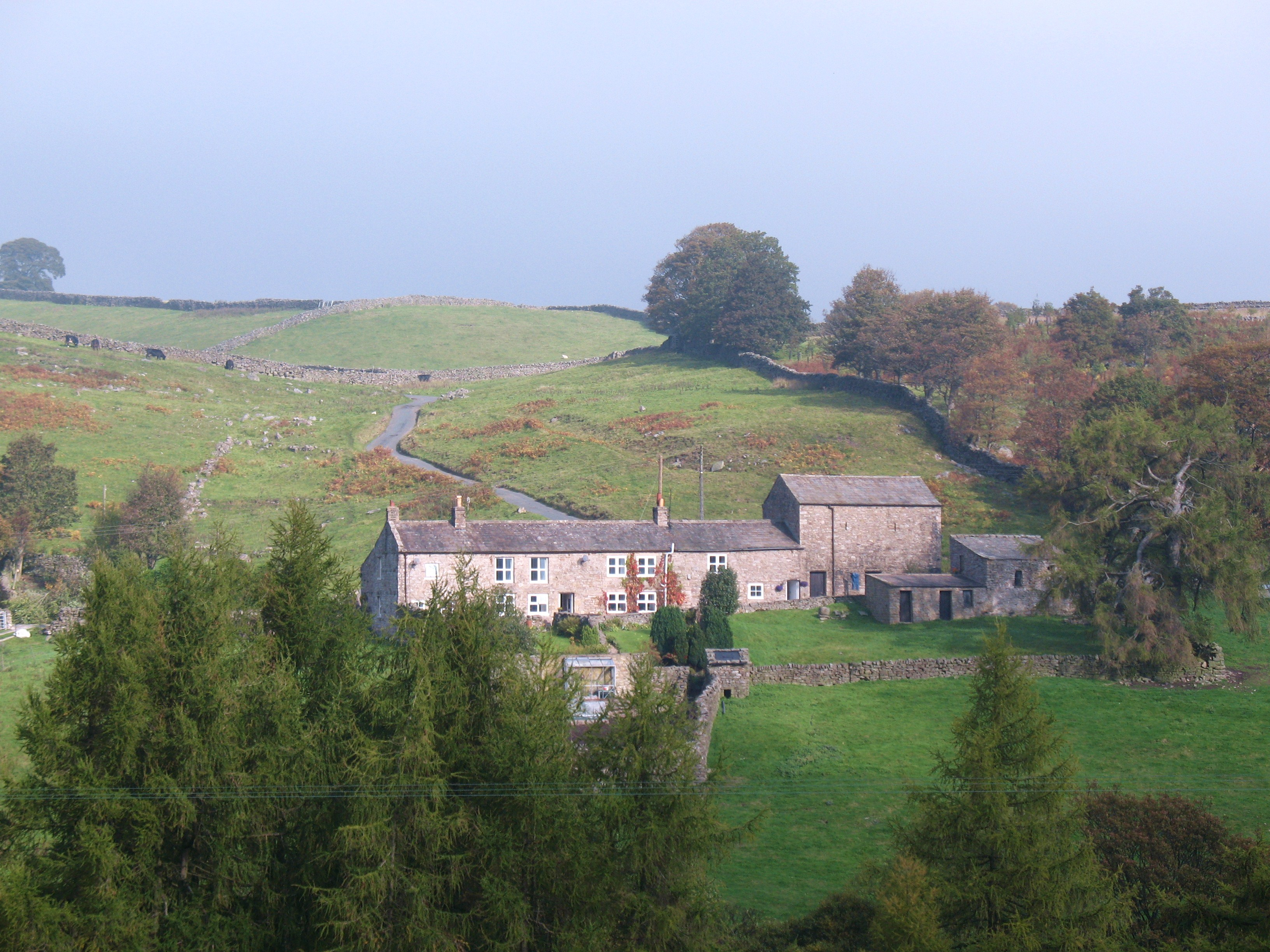
- Low Eskeleth

- Location within North Yorkshire
- OS grid reference: NZ000024
- Civil parish: Arkengarthdale
- Unitary authority: North Yorkshire
- Ceremonial county: North Yorkshire
- Region: Yorkshire and the Humber
- Country: England
- Sovereign state: United Kingdom
- Post town: RICHMOND
- Police: North Yorkshire
- Fire: North Yorkshire
- Ambulance: Yorkshire

Eskeleth is a hamlet in Arkengarthdale in North Yorkshire, England. It is in the Yorkshire Dales National Park. Eskeleth sits 4 miles (6.4 km) from the village of Reeth.

From 1974 to 2023 it was part of the district of Richmondshire, it is now administered by the unitary North Yorkshire Council.

As with all places in Arkengarthdale, there is no record for the location in the Domesday Book, however, in 1280, it was recorded as Exherlede. The origin of the name is uncertain. The first element in the name seems difficult to trace, but the second element is likely to be Old English or Old Norse hlið 'slope'.
