= Whaw =

Hamlet in North Yorkshire, England

Coordinates: 54.43794°N 2.02503°W

- Location within North Yorkshire
- OS grid reference: NY984047
- Unitary authority: North Yorkshire
- Ceremonial county: North Yorkshire
- Region: Yorkshire and the Humber
- Country: England
- Sovereign state: United Kingdom
- Police: North Yorkshire
- Fire: North Yorkshire
- Ambulance: Yorkshire

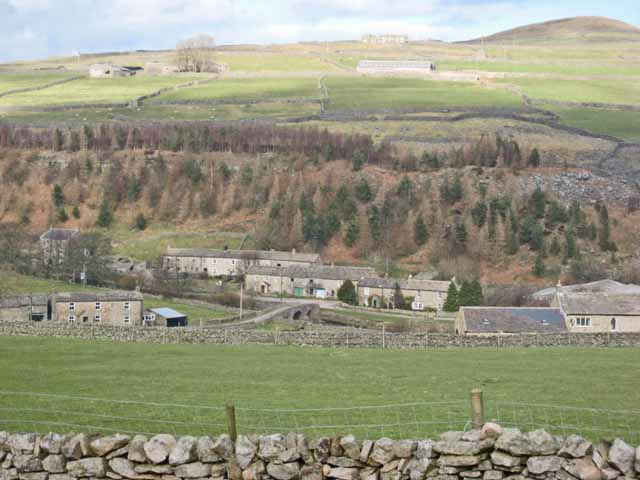
Looking north across Arkle Beck to Whaw

Whaw is a hamlet in Arkengarthdale in North Yorkshire, England. It is one of few settlements in the dale and is one of the smallest. Its name derives from the Old Norse of Kvi and Hagi, which means the enclosure of the sheep. It is about 2 miles (3.2 km) north of Langthwaite and 5 miles (8 km) north west of Reeth. The adjacent Arkle Beck Meadows form a Site of Special Scientific Interest.

The hillsides around Whaw are scarred with the remnants of lead mining and former hushes are still in evidence. During the 18th and 19th centuries, the hamlet was (and the whole of Arkengarthdale) were subject to a higher population because of the miners working in the hills. In 1840, a Wesleyan chapel was built in Whaw, this survives but no longer as a religious house.

The 1851 census counted 18 houses in Whaw. In the 2011 census, Whaw was counted in Arkengarthdale Parish as having 231 residents overall.

From 1974 to 2023 it was part of the district of Richmondshire, it is now administered by the unitary North Yorkshire Council.
