= Arkle Town =

Hamlet in North Yorkshire, England

Coordinates: 54.41714°N 1.99214°W

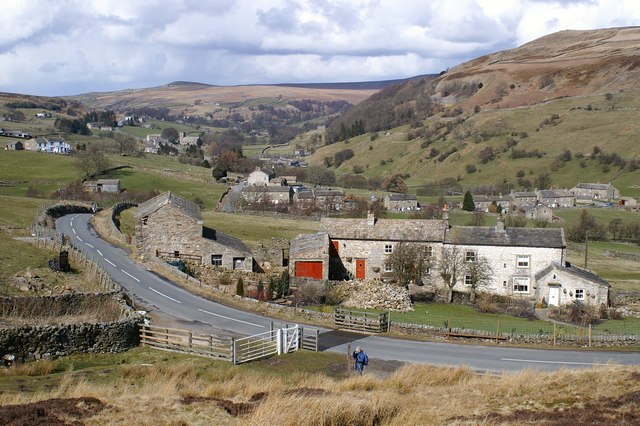
- Looking past Raw Bank to Arkle Town in the middle distance with Langthwaite behind

- Location within North Yorkshire
- OS grid reference: NZ006024
- Unitary authority: North Yorkshire
- Ceremonial county: North Yorkshire
- Region: Yorkshire and the Humber
- Country: England
- Sovereign state: United Kingdom
- Post town: RICHMOND
- Postcode district: DL11
- Dialling code: 01748
- Police: North Yorkshire
- Fire: North Yorkshire
- Ambulance: Yorkshire
- UK Parliament: Richmond and Northallerton

Arkle Town is a hamlet in Arkengarthdale in the county of North Yorkshire, England. It is situated 0.4 miles (0.64 km) to the south of Langthwaite and 2.7 miles (4.3 km) north-west of Reeth.

== History ==
"Arkel" is a Norse personal name and probably arrived with settlers during the tenth century. Formerly it had a parish church, inn and workhouse, the only evidence of these buildings that remains is a small number of gravestones at the site of the former St. Mary's Church, which was relocated further up the dale in 1816. The 1851 census counted 41 houses in Arkle Town.

== Governance ==
The hamlet is within the Richmond and Northallerton parliamentary constituency, which is under the control of the Conservative Party. The current Member of Parliament, since the 2015 general election, is Rishi Sunak.

From 1974 to 2023 it was part of the district of Richmondshire, it is now administered by the unitary North Yorkshire Council.
