= Old Powder Magazine =

Building in Arkengarthdale, North Yorkshire, England

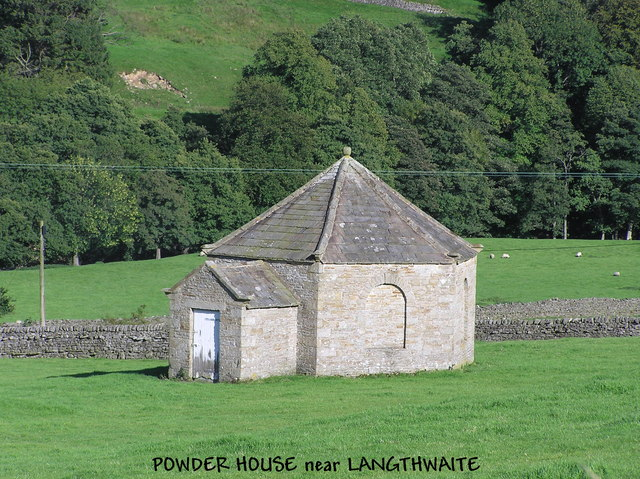
The building, in 2005

The Old Powder Magazine is a historic building in Arkengarthdale, a village in North Yorkshire, in England.

The building was constructed in about 1804, to store gunpowder used in the nearby C. B. lead mines. Named for Charles Bathurst, in 1800 the local mining rights had been transferred to a company based in Newcastle upon Tyne. A large mill was constructed in 1803, along with workshops which still survive, but the powder magazine was constructed in a field a short distance away, in case of explosion. After the closure of the mines and mill, the magazine was used for agriculture. It was grade II* listed in 1966.

The single-storey hexagonal building is constructed of rubble, with quoins and a roof of stone slates. On one side is a window, inserted after its use as a magazine ceased, while the other sides have blank windows. The roof has a pyramidal form, and is topped by a finial in the shape of a ball. There is one doorway, with a porch, and was formerly an additional doorway in the opposite side. Inside, the walls and ceiling are plastered.

== See also ==
- Listed buildings in Arkengarthdale
