= Arkengarthdale =

Dale in North Yorkshire, England

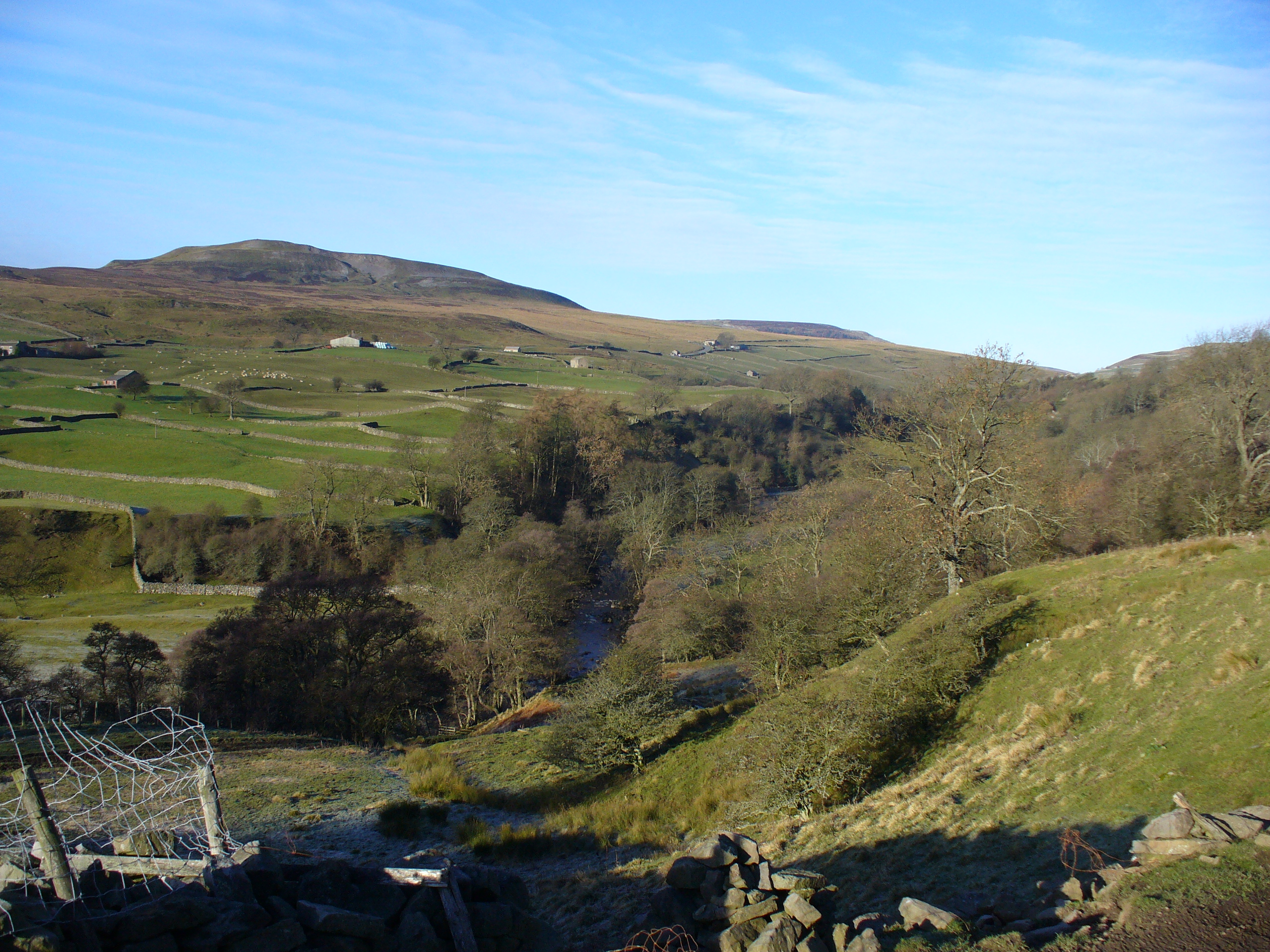
- Looking up Arkengarthdale towards Calver Hill

- Location within North Yorkshire
- Floor elevation: 1,000 feet (300 m)
- Length: 11 mi (18 km)

Geography
- Location: North Yorkshire
- Country: England
- Coordinates: 54.417°N 1.988°W
- River: Arkle Beck
- Interactive map of Arkengarthdale

Arkengarthdale is a dale, or valley, on the east side of the Pennines in North Yorkshire, England. Running roughly north-west to south-east, it is the valley of the Arkle Beck, and is the northernmost of the Yorkshire Dales. It is a subsidiary dale to Swaledale, which it joins at Reeth. The history of the dale, its people, and farming, lead mining, and local crafts is displayed and documented in the Swaledale Museum in Reeth.

The moors on both sides of Arkengarthdale are used for the annual Scott Trial, a cross-country motorcycle endurance event.

The Dale cuts through the eastern half of a major lead mining field and lead was extracted from the area for over a thousand years. Most of the mining structures have now disappeared leaving only the spoil heaps and the line of an 3,600-foot (1,100 m) long chimney from the site of the smelting mill.

The current economy of the dale depends on hill farming, grouse shooting and tourism. In 1989 Arkengarthdale (and Swaledale) were designated as a Barns and Walls Conservation Area.

== History ==
A local resident, Anthony Peacock, was executed in Richmond for his part in the Pilgrimage of Grace in 1536.

In 1736 Christopher Hind was transported to the "King's plantations for seven years" possibly for poaching.

In the 19th century a lead ingot with the name Hadrian stamped on it was found, at Hurst, east of the dale. This find, which has been lost at the British Museum, as well as records of the Romans at Richmond using Brigantian slaves digging for lead, has led to the assumption that the Romans were mining lead in Arkengarthdale in the 2nd century. The large proportion of Viking names, Fagger Gill, Kitley Hill, Langthwaite and Whaw, indicates Viking settlement during the 10th century, probably arriving from the west. Arkil is a Viking name which leads to speculation that he was a local leader. However, despite its history pre-dating the Domesday Book, none of the settlements in the area appear in the Domesday survey.

Following the Norman conquest in the 11th century a large part of North Yorkshire was given to Count Alan, a member of William's family. He kept Arkengarthdale and neighbouring New Forest as a hunting "forest" which was policed by forest rangers. In the 14th century there were eight gamekeepers employed preventing game being hunted in the dale.

Towards the end of the 13th century there were 30 cottages in the Parish, but there followed a period lasting over a century of depression and de-population, with plague and war with France.

By the end of the 16th century the Earls of Richmond had died out and Arkengarthdale and New Forest reverted to the Crown. In 1473, Edward IV had granted the lordship of the area to his brother, Richard, Duke of Gloucester, and when Richard eventually succeeded to the throne in 1483, the manor became a crown property. Attempts by Crown agents to change the leases of the 55 tenants of small-holdings in the area led to protracted disputes. In 1628 the Crown, in an attempt to clear its debts, sold Arkengarthdale as well as other estates to the City of London. In 1656 the valley was bought by Charles Bathurst, who was Oliver Cromwell's doctor.

The estate remained in the Bathurst family for four generations, John, Theodore and Charles, until in 1740 it was inherited by Charles's three great-granddaughters. At that time married women were not allowed to own property so the estate belonged to their husbands.

In 1770 the turnpike road from Reeth to Brough via Tan Hill was opened. This greatly reduced the cost of transporting lead and coal from the mines since carts could be used instead of pack-horse trains.

Between 1808 and 1811 a London banker, George Brown of Stockton, bought all three parts of the estate. Before his death in 1814, Brown had rebuilt the school and laid plans for a new church. The estate was inherited by his sister and his second sister's husband Rev John Gilpin, vicar of Stockton.

In 1818, St Mary the Virgin's Church was built in Langthwaite. The architectural style is unusual in such a rural setting as the commissioner's churches were normally intended for urban areas. The Anglican church became a grade II listed structure in 1986. A Wesleyan chapel was built in Langthwaite in 1882, being used up until 2014. It is now a private dwelling.

At the beginning of the 20th century, Mathew Edward Stones was widely known for his skill at water and metal divining using hazel twigs.

37 men from Arkengarthdale served in the First World War, four of whom were killed.

1921 was the first year in which anyone in the dale owned a car, it was a Ford.

== Population ==
The early 19th century was a time of growth in the dale. In 1801 there was a population of 1,186. In 1811 it had risen to 1,529. In 1798 there were 34 miners and 1 farmer; in 1820 there were 9 farmers, 5 innkeepers, 4 mining agents, 2 flour dealers, a curate, a schoolmaster, a clogger, a shoemaker and a shopkeeper. In 1831 there were 285 males over 25 years old working as miners.

But with the decline of the price of lead from £33 a ton in 1801 to £13 10s in 1831 a depression followed during which people left the dale in search of work; some to the factories in Derbyshire and Lancashire, others to the mines in County Durham, a significant number also emigrated to America.

The average age of death of miners between 1835 and 1841 was 54 years, 5 months. Typhus was common in the dale.

=== 1851 census ===
The 1851 census records 1283 people in the dale; for 1073 of them it was their place of birth. There was a male population of 659; 254 of whom were lead miners and a further 42 were involved in smelting, construction and transport. 18 women and children washed the ore. There were 7 coal miners living in William Gill. There were 49 farms employing 64 men and women. Among the over fourteen trades counted were four dressmakers, one knitter and one tailor. 51 of the 294 boys under the age 15 and 40 of the 247 girls were at school.

Following the 1883 closure of CB Mining, most of the miners moved on in search of work. By 1891, the population of the dale was 761.

== Geography, geology and access ==
The dale stretches for 11 miles (18 km) starting at Reeth, and running in a north-westerly direction, until it reaches higher ground on the road to Tan Hill. The valley is an average of 1,000 feet (300 m) above sea level, and the moorland tops are on average 2,000 feet (610 m). In the last Ice Age, a glacier broke off from the main stem which was carving Stainmore, and heading south-east to carve Arkengarthdale.

On its way up the dale from Reeth, an unclassified road crosses many small streams and their catchments, such as Great Punchard Gill, Roe Beck, Annaside Beck, and William Gill. It passes through several small settlements: Raw, Arkle Town, Langthwaite (where a narrow back road leads to Booze), Eskeleth and Whaw.

At Eskeleth Bridge, another unclassified road forks north-east (towards Barnard Castle); this also joins a minor road running along the northern side of the dale to Whaw. Beyond Whaw is the most sparsely populated upper part of Arkengarthdale, which here runs roughly west–east. This area is one of the most northerly parts of the Yorkshire Dales National Park. Eventually the dale ends and the road reaches the Tan Hill Inn, the highest in England, just outside the Park, near the Pennine watershed.

Beyond Tan Hill, the road divides again, heading westward to Brough, south to Keld and south-west to Kirkby Stephen.

=== Lead mining ===
Lead is found in veins running through the extensive limestone and chert beds which extend from Swaledale. One of the earliest techniques for extracting the ore is called "hushing". It involved the controlled release of dammed water along the line of a lead-bearing vein to wash away the top soil allowing the vein to be worked. The Roman historian Pliny records this method being used in Britain to extract lead. Some examples of hushes can be found in Arkengarthdale, as well as traces of dams and other water works.

The other early method used was the digging of bell pits with lateral tunnels, called drifts, following the vein. The drifts would be extended until they became unsafe and another pit would be dug further along. Lines of these pits can still be seen across the moors.

Apart from a locally found Roman lead "pig" stamped with the name Hadrian, the earliest record of lead being taken from the dale dates from 1285. It states that the Lord's mine made a profit of £4, possibly referring to Faggergill.

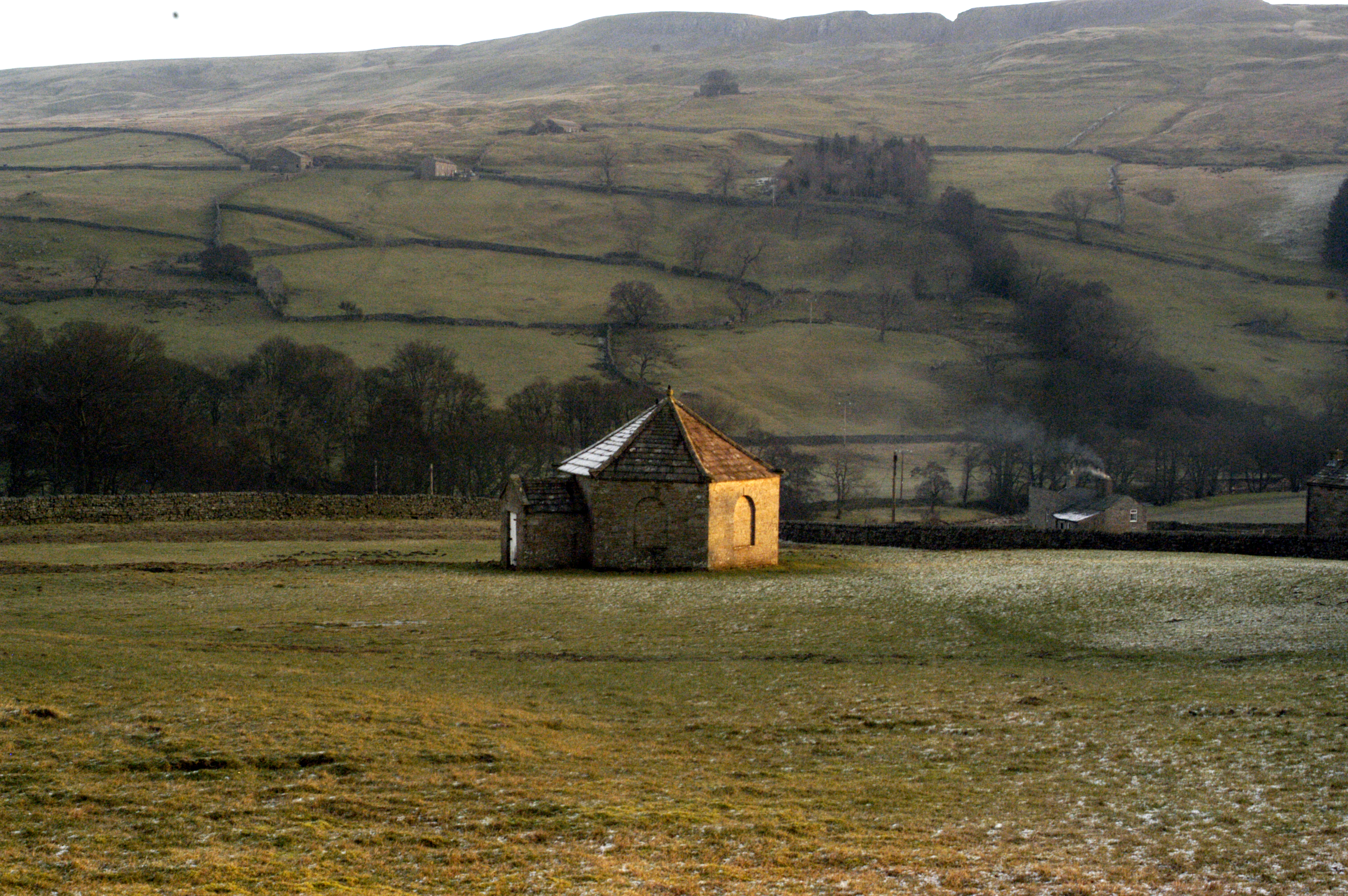
Powder house used for storing gunpowder for CB lead mines.

By 1521, there was extensive mining in Arkengarthdale, at Moulds, Punchard Gill and Faggergill. Bell pits were common in the 17th and 18th centuries. The lead was sold to lead merchants based in York. Gunpowder was introduced about 1700, and had become common by 1750. This led to the digging of deep-level tunnels into the hillsides. By the end of the 19th century one could enter the Moulds Level in Arkengarthdale and travel six miles underground to the Sir Frances Mine in Gunnerside Gill, Swaledale. The hexagonal Old Powder Magazine was built in 1804 and is now a grade II* listed building.

In 1750 the Moulds Level, north-west of Langthwaite, was worked out. It was later used as a route for transporting ore from the Old Gang Levels in the next valley to the west. It had its own smelting mill, but this was knocked down after the building of the Octagonal Mill.

The lead mining in Arkengarthdale was dominated by the CB (Charles Bathhurst) Company, which was founded in 1656 when a Dr Bathhurst purchased from the Crown the right to mine in the area. His company continued until 1911 when the lead-mining industry in Yorkshire collapsed due to the slump in the price of lead.

Water was always a problem in the mines. During the 18th century a group of miners working underground near Boldershaw blasted into an underground lake. Twenty-four miners and two pit ponies were drowned in the flood that followed. Modern research of parish records has failed to find evidence of this disaster, except for the deaths of three miners drowned after an underground lake was breached.

In 1820, miners in Little Punchard Gill created a canal level along which ore and spoil could be floated to the surface. The existence of this water level is disputed by modern researchers.

=== The Octagonal and the New Mills ===
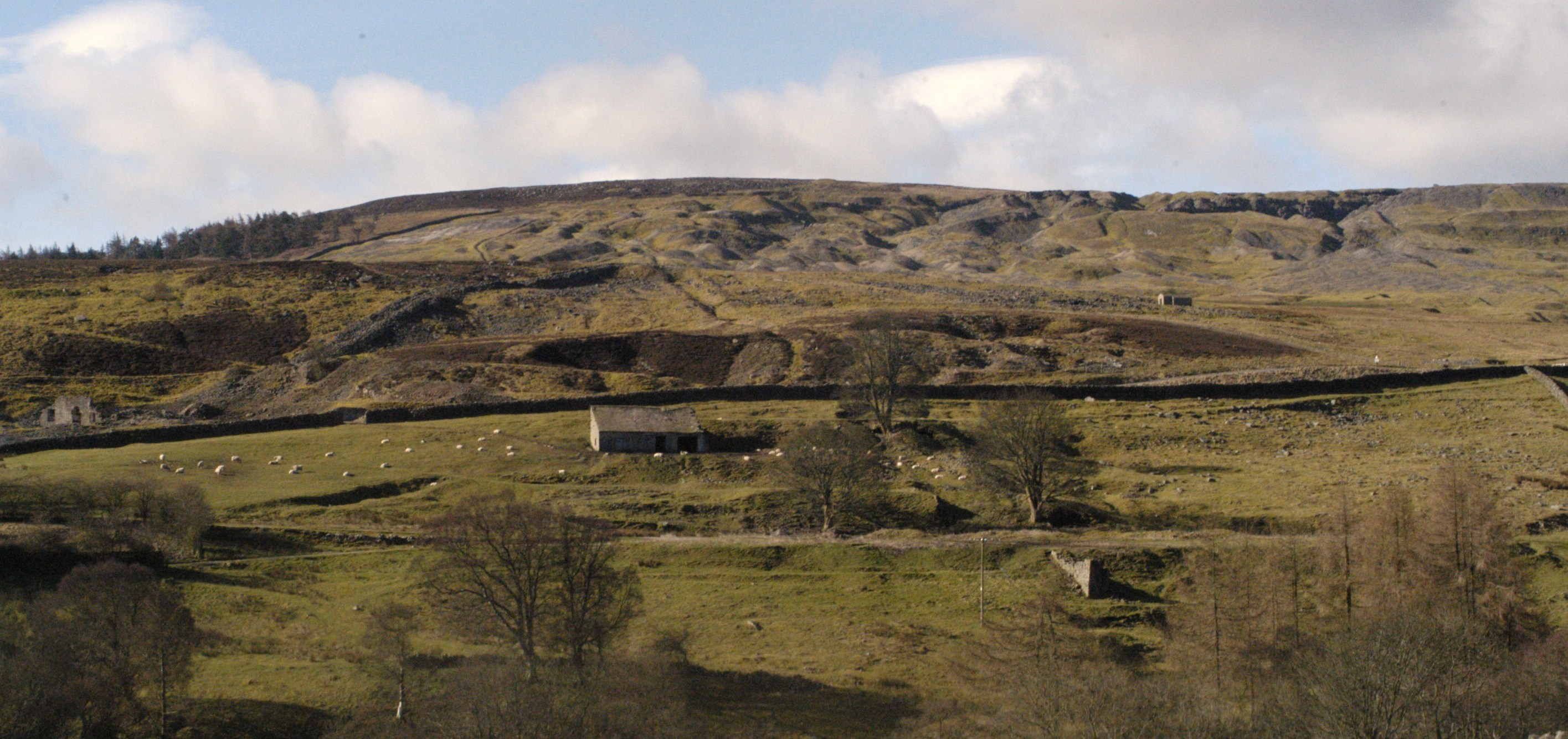
Site of Octagonal Mill with the Hungry Hushes in the background.

In 1800 the mines of Arkengarthdale were let for 21 years to a Newcastle company for a fixed rent rather than a percentage of the lead mined. The company, under its manager Frederick Hall, invested heavily in new technology.

In 1804 they built a new smelting mill, 2 miles (3.2 km) north of Langthwaite. It was octagonal in design, 110 feet (34 m) by 75 feet (23 m), with a 36-foot (11 m) diameter water wheel to drive the bellows. It had four flues and a timber roof.

In 1824, the octagonal mill was replaced by the New Mill a few hundred yards away on the other side of the Tan Hill road. The New Mill was built by Easterby Hall & Co. for Ark & Darwent Mining Company. It had improved fire chamber design and a 33 feet (10 m) water wheel, but used the existing chimney which ran half a mile up to the top of the moor. This kind of flue was large enough to allow men to climb up the inside and scrape off the condensed lead. It also vented the toxic residues away from livestock and vegetation.

The Octagonal Mill continued life as a saw mill until in 1941 one of the roof timbers gave way and the roof was taken down. Today only the clearing on which it stood can be made out. Some parts of walls from the New Mill can be seen from the Tan Hill road. It closed in 1883, the last lease-holder being Whitewell & Company. The route of the collapsed double flue up the moor is easy to follow. The powder house is still standing. For a time it was used for candle making. The octagon was believed to have special properties for containing explosions.

In 1870 there was a strike at the Faggergill Mine over the new management's insistence that the morning shift should start at a fixed time. After an eight-week stoppage the miners were forced to accept the changes.

The last lead-mining enterprise in the Dale was Stang and Cleasby Mines, formed in 1908. They dug the Nuthole Mine, connecting to the Faggergill Levels and managed to remain profitable until 1914. They created a mile-long horse level cutting through the multiple existing levels. The total length of the Faggergill levels is calculated to be around fifteen miles. The mine was last recorded as being worked in 1912.

Other minerals were extracted from the Dale but on a smaller scale. Coal was mined in Punchard Gill until the 1940s. Chert was taken from the Hungry Hushes and along Fremington Edge, also ceasing after 1940.

== Settlements ==
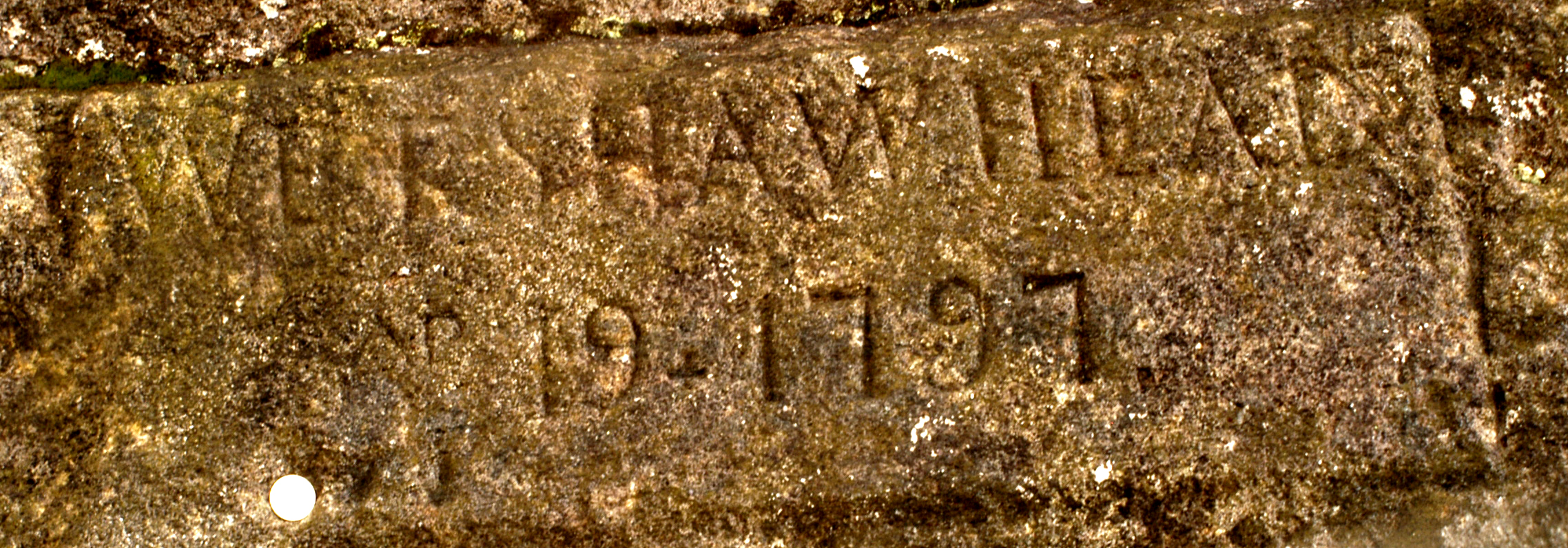
Inscription on moors above Black Hills. "Wet Shaw Head Ap 19 + 1797".

- Arkle Town
- Booze
- High Seal
- Eskeleth
- Langthwaite
- Sealhouses
- Whaw

== Civil parish ==
Arkengarthdale is also a civil parish in North Yorkshire, England, which includes most of the dale. The population of this civil parish taken at the 2011 census was 231.

The lowest part of the dale, below Arkle Town and including the hamlet of Raw, is in the civil parish of Reeth, Fremington and Healaugh.

== See also ==
- Listed buildings in Arkengarthdale

== Gallery ==
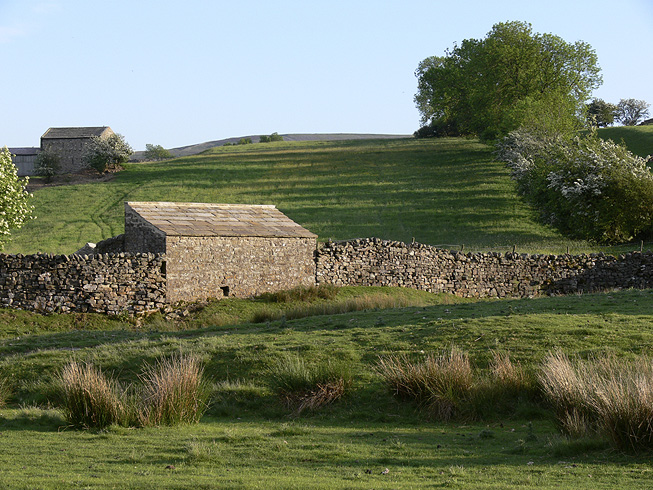
Traditional stone barns and dry stone walls on the outskirts of Reeth in lower Arkengarthdale

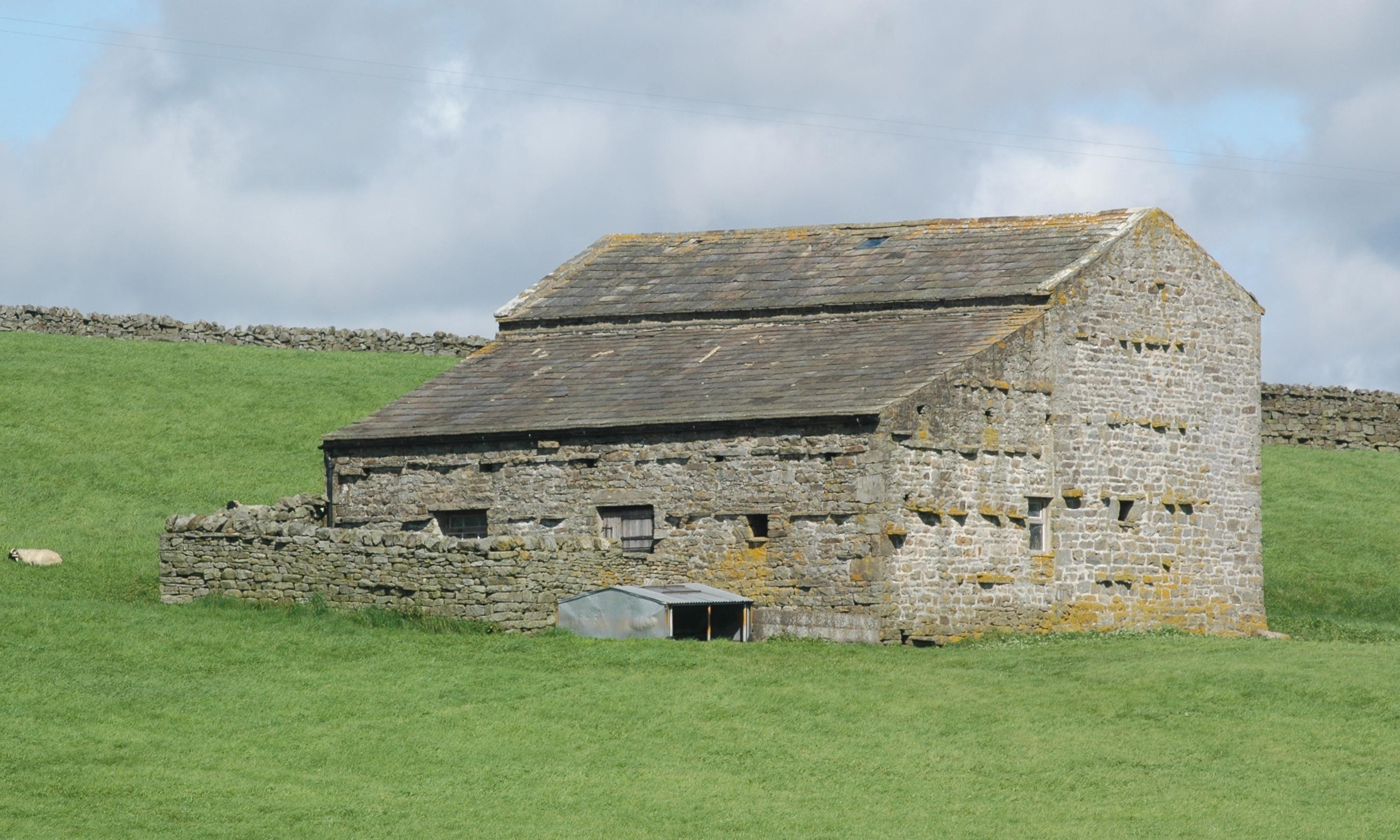
Traditional stone barn with outshut and livestock enclosure between Arkle Gill and Punchard Beck, about 2 miles (3.2 km) north-west of Langthwaite

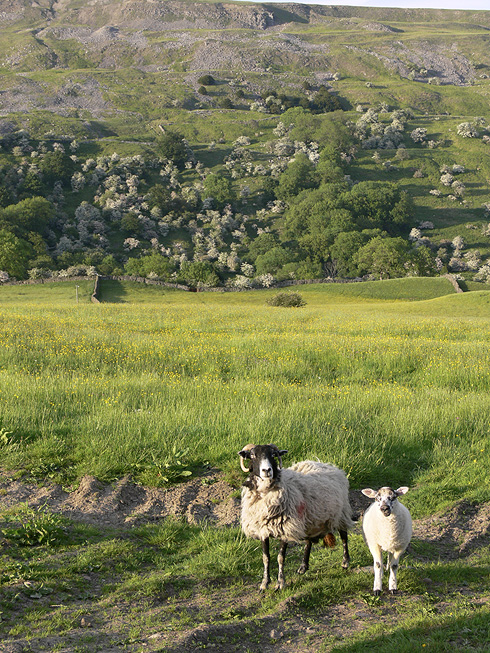
Sheep and lamb in lower Arkengarthdale with Fremington Edge in background

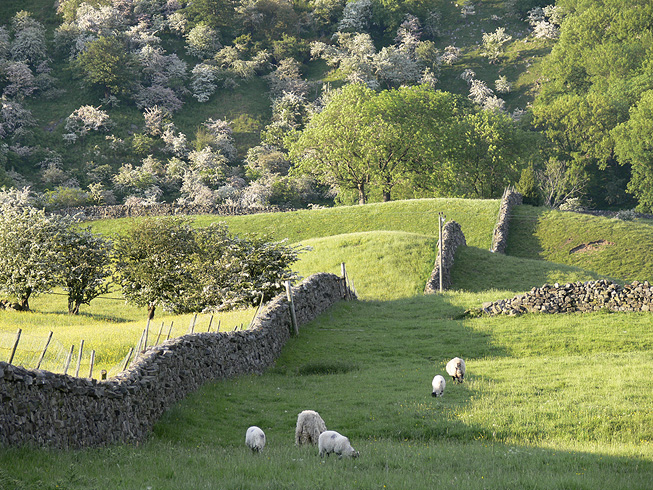
Sheep grazing in lower Arkengarthdale with Fremington Edge in background

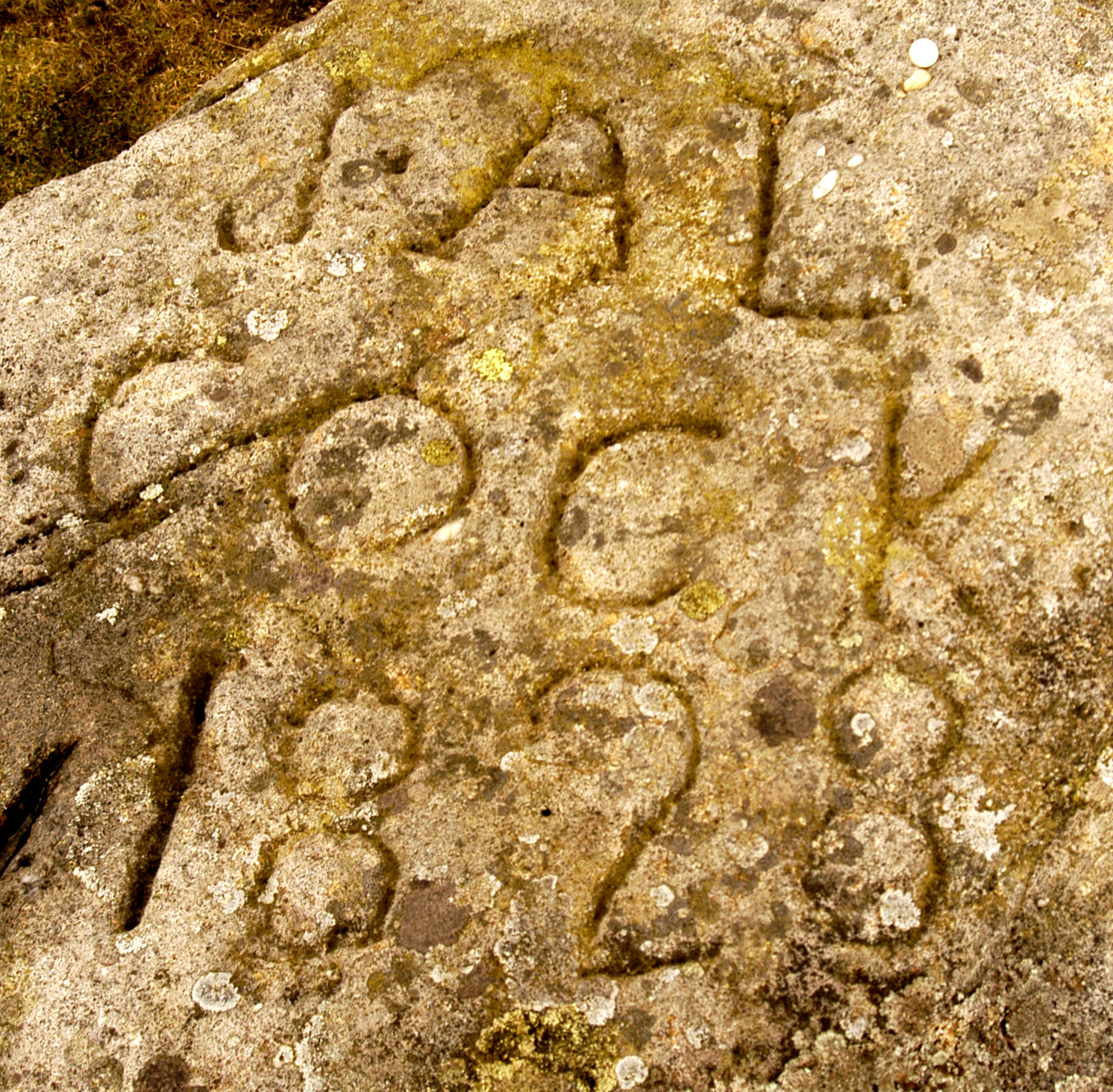
Hungry Hushes: Graffiti "J.Alcock 1828". Coin 22mm.
