= Arkle Beck =

Stream in North Yorkshire, England

Coordinates: 54.3824°N 1.9347°W

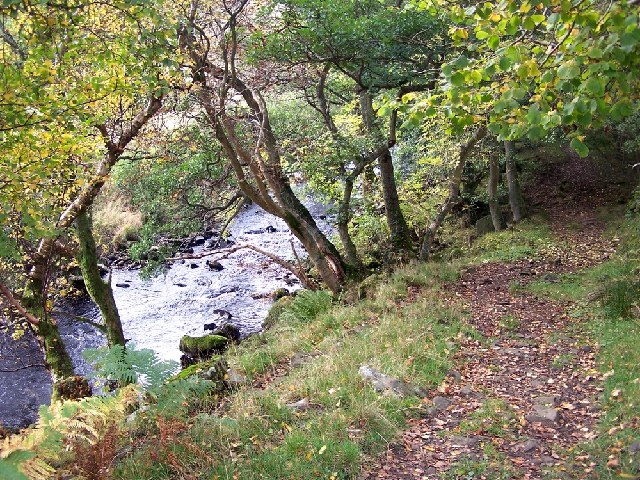
- Arkle Beck near Whaw

Location
- Country: England

Physical characteristics
- Source
  - location: Arkengarthdale
- Mouth
  - location: River Swale

Arkle Beck is the stream running through the valley of Arkengarthdale in the Yorkshire Dales, England. It is a tributary of the River Swale, which it joins just past Reeth at Grinton Bridge. The beck itself has several tributaries which include:

- Great Punchard Gill joins the beck just north of Whaw
- William Gill drains a substantial area of West Moor into Beck Crooks, which is the first tributary after Arkle Beck's source
- Annaside Beck joins just below Beck Crooks
- Roe Beck joins at Shepherd's Lodge just above Great Punchard Gill

In 1986, a section of the meadow alongside Arkle Beck at Whaw was designated as a site of special scientific interest (SSSI).
