= Langthwaite =

Village in North Yorkshire, England

Coordinates: 54.41792°N 1.99533°W

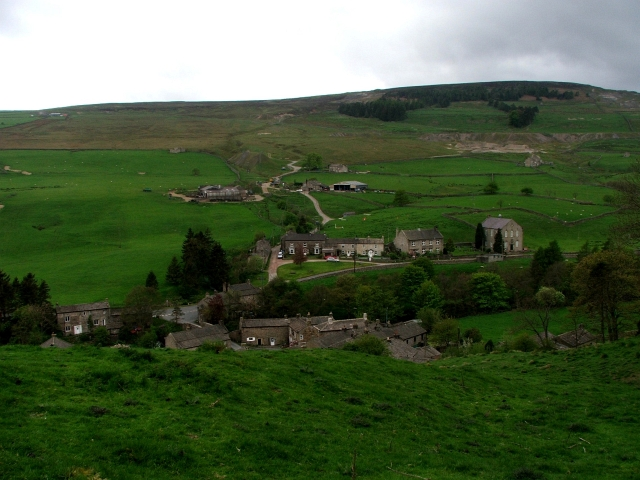
- Langthwaite

- Location within North Yorkshire
- OS grid reference: NZ004024
- Unitary authority: North Yorkshire
- Ceremonial county: North Yorkshire
- Region: Yorkshire and the Humber
- Country: England
- Sovereign state: United Kingdom
- Post town: RICHMOND
- Postcode district: DL11
- Police: North Yorkshire
- Fire: North Yorkshire
- Ambulance: Yorkshire
- UK Parliament: Richmond and Northallerton

Langthwaite is one of the few villages in Arkengarthdale, North Yorkshire, England. It is 3.5 miles (5.6 km) north of Reeth and sits 870 feet (270 m) above sea level. It is the main settlement in the dale and is one of the most northerly settlements in the whole of Yorkshire Dales National Park. Langthwaite is one of two places in the dale that have houses clustered together closely in a traditional village set up; the rest of the settlements in the dale are populated by scattered buildings.

It is home to a pub ('The Red Lion'), a shop and St Mary the Virgin's Church of 1818, Langthwaite is also home to the grade II* listed hexagonal Old Powder House, built in 1807 to store gunpowder used in the many mines dotted around the area.

The 1851 census counted 48 houses in Langthwaite.

The village was used for the filming of several scenes in the television series All Creatures Great and Small. The Red Lion was featured in the episode "Every Dog Has His Day" but was made out to be in fictional Briston, while the frontage of the fictional J. R. Stubbs provisions store and the bridge which Siegfried Farnon and James Herriot drive over, featured in the opening credits of the later series, are also in the village. Another TV series, Century Falls, also featured Langthwaite. The 1976 Disney film Escape from the Dark was partly filmed in Langthwaite and around Arkengarthdale.

The name of the village is Old Norse in origin and means 'the long meadow' or 'the long clearing'.

== See also ==
- Listed buildings in Arkengarthdale
