= List of waterfalls in England =

The uplands of the north and west of England enjoy the wettest climate and are home to the majority of waterfalls in the country. In areas such as the Lake District which were formerly glaciated, they are commonly found at the lower ends of hanging valleys. Typical of those in the Pennines, are falls which form at points where the watercourse encounters erosion-resistant rock layers such as Millstone Grit.

== Names of falls ==
The great majority of named falls in England are situated in the Lake District and Pennines. In these regions the terms ‘foss’ and ‘force’ are much the most common ones used for a waterfall though linn is also encountered towards the Scottish border. The term ‘spout’ is another frequently found alternative.

== Alphabetical tables of named waterfalls ==
=== A ===
Waterfall name	River or stream	OS Grid ref.	General location
Acroy Gill Force	Acroy Gill	SD825950	near Cotterdale
Aira Force	Aira Beck	NY399205	near Dockray, north of Ullswater
Archy's Linn	Smales Burn	NY713832	in Kielder Forest
Ashgill Force	Ash Gill	NY758405	near Alston, Cumbria
Aygill Force	Ay Gill	NY886003	near Keld, Swaledale
Aysgarth Falls	River Ure	SE003888 to SE021888	near Aysgarth, Wensleydale
Aysgill Force	Gayle Beck	SD863883	Sleddale near Hawes

=== B ===
Waterfall name	River or stream	OS Grid ref.	general location
Becky Falls	Becka Brook	SX760800	near Manaton, Dartmoor
Beezley Falls	River Doe	SD705747	north of Ingleton
Bells Linn	Bells Burn	NY612948	in Kielder Forest (on Scottish border)
Biggersdale Hole	unnamed tributary of East Row Beck	NZ83951125	west of Whitby
Birker Force	Low Birker Pool	SD187999	near Boot, Eskdale
Black Force	Great Eggleshope Beck	NY961313	north of Middleton-in-Teesdale
Black Force	Little Ulgill Beck	SD645991	in Howgill Fells
Black Foss Waterfall	West Hall Beck	SE091508	near Addingham, Wharfedale
Black Lynn	Linhope Burn	NT962168	near Cheviot Hills
Black Rock Falls	River Lyd	SX574715	near Lydford
Blake Beck Force	Great Blake Beck	SD768855	upper Dentdale
Blea Gill Head	Blea Gill	NY909178	near Balderhead Reservoir, Baldersdale
Blea Gill Waterfall	Blea Beck	SE045660	north of Grimwith Reservoir
Bleabeck Force	Blea Beck	NY875278	in Teesdale
Bleaberry Force	Bleaberry Beck	NY847078	near Kaber
Brigg Linn	Brigg Burn	NY865895	near Redesdale
Broada Falls	River Avon, Devon	SX653669	near South Brent, Dartmoor
Brockholes Force	Brockholes Gill	NY814008	near Birk Dale
Broombridgedean Linn	Broomridgedean Burn	NY982367	north of Wooler, 3 miles east of Ford, Northumberland village next to Routin Linn, Northumberland
Burnet Force	Force Beck	SD942873	south of Bainbridge
Burrator Waterfall	River Meavy	SX551675	near Burrator Reservoir

=== C ===
Waterfall name	River or stream	OS Grid ref.	general location
Canonteign Falls (artificial)	tributary of River Teign	SX831824	near Chudleigh
Cash Force	Cash Burn	NY700388	north of Cross Fell
Catrake Force	River Swale	NY892013	near Keld, Swaledale
Catrigg Force	Stainforth Beck	SD832671	near Stainforth
Cauldron Snout	River Tees	NY814286	below Cow Green Reservoir
Cautley Spout	Cautley Holme Beck	SD680975	in Howgill Fells
Chattlehope Spout	Chattlehope Burn	NT711010	near Castle Crag Forest
Clampitt Falls	tributary of the River Teign	unknown	north of Chudleigh
Cliff Force	Cliff Beck	SD875960	southwest of Thwaite
Coal Force	Rowantree Gill	SD818972	near Cotterdale
Corby Linn	Hawkhope Burn	NY713906	in Kielder Forest
Corby Linn	tributary of Ridlees Burn	NT852068	near Upper Coquet Dale
Cotter Force	Cotterdale Beck	SD848919	near Wensleydale
Currack Force	Stonesdale Beck	NY888015	near Keld, Swaledale
Crammel Linn	River Irthing	NY640696	near Gilsland, Northumberland

=== D to F ===
Waterfall name	River or stream	OS Grid ref.	General location
Deep Gill Force	Deep Gill Beck	SE148845	near Jervaulx Abbey
Dungeon Ghyll Force	Dungeon Ghyll	NY288067	near Langdale
East Gill Force	East Gill at confluence with River Swale	NY897011	east of Keld
Falling Foss	May Beck	NZ888035	south of Sleights
Flinter Gill High Spout	Flinter Gill	SD700853	south side of Dentdale
Force Gill Force	Force Gill Beck	SD760816	near Ribblehead
Fordingdale Force	Measand Beck	NY470158	west of Haweswater Reservoir

=== G ===
Waterfall name	River or stream	OS Grid ref.	general location
Galleny Force	Stonethwaite Beck	NY273131	near Stonethwaite, Borrowdale
Gaping Gill (entrance shaft of cave)	Fell Beck	SD751727	southern slopes of Ingleborough
Gibson's Spout	Crookley Beck or River Annas	SD121884	near Bootle
Gill Force	River Esk	NY178001	near Boot, Eskdale
Goat Linn	Eals Cleugh	NY747834	in Kielder Forest
Gordale Scar	Gordale Beck	SD915640	near Malham
Golitha Falls	Fowey		2 km west of the village of St Cleer Cornwall
Great Force	Lead Up Gill	SE073825	near West Scrafton, Coverdale

=== H ===
Waterfall name	River or stream	OS Grid ref.	general location
Hard Level Force	Mill Gill or Old Gang Beck	NY968008	near Healaugh, Swaledale
Hardraw Force	Hardraw Beck	SD869916	near Hardraw, Wensleydale
Hareshaw Linn	Hareshaw Burn	NY842853	north of Bellingham
Harthope Linn	Harthope Burn	NT927203	east of The Cheviot
Hellgill Force	River Eden	SD780966	south of Mallerstang
Hetherpool Linn	College Burn	NT902285	in Cheviot Hills
High Ash Gill Scar	Ash Gill	SD895865	near Marsett, Raydale
High Force	River Tees	NY880283	near Bowlees, Teesdale
High Force	Hacker Gill	SD751855	south side of Dentdale
High Force	Hoods Bottom Beck	NY863036	near Muker, Swaledale
High Force	Aira Beck	NY400209	near Dockray, north of Ullswater
High Force (Aysgarth Falls)	River Ure	SE010886	near Aysgarth, Wensleydale
High Park Scar	Cragdale Water	SD913853	near Stalling Busk, Raydale
Holme Force	Holme Beck	NY118213	near Loweswater
Horseshoe Falls	River Dart	SX710704	west of Ashburton
Horton Gill Force	Horton Gill	SD904884	east of Hawes, Wensleydale
Huggill Force	Hug Gill	NY977125	near Bowes

=== I, J ===
Waterfall name	River or stream	OS Grid ref.	general location
Intake Force	Bleaberry Beck	NY853086	near Kaber
Janet's Foss	Gordale Beck	SD911633	near Malham
Jenny Whalley Force	Hoods Bottom Beck	NY863034	near Muker, Swaledale
Jerry's Linn	Chirdon Burn	NY744812	in Kielder Forest

=== K ===
Waterfall name	River or stream	OS Grid ref.	general location
Keld Hole	Roxby Beck	NZ755141	near Scaling Reservoir
Keld Scar	Gill Beck	SD916860	near Stalling Busk, Raydale
Kinder Downfall	River Kinder	SK083889	west edge of Kinder Scout
Kisdon Force	River Swale	NY898009	near Keld, Swaledale

=== L ===
Waterfall name	River or stream	OS Grid ref.	general location
Ladies Linn	Hesleyside Burn	NY815833	west of Bellingham
Lady Exmouth Falls	tributary of River Teign	SX8382	near Chudleigh, Devon
Leehouse Linn	Whiskershiel Burn	NY965929	near Elsdon and Harwood Forest
Light Spout	Cardingmill Brook	SO430950	Long Mynd
Lindhope Linn	Lindhope Burn	NT911130	near Kidland Forest
Linhope Spout	Linhope Burn	NT958171	near Linhope, west of Ingram
Linton Falls	River Wharfe	SE001633	near Grassington
Lodore Falls	Watendlath Beck	NY265187	south of Derwent Water
Low Ash Gill Scar	Ash Gill	SD894863	near Marsett, Raydale
Low Force	River Tees	NY908280	near Forest-in-Teesdale, Teesdale
Low Force	Pudding Beck	NY196214	south of Whinlatter Pass
Lower Force (Aysgarth Falls)	River Ure	SE018888	near Aysgarth, Wensleydale
Lumb Hole Waterfall	Crimsworth Dean Beck	SD992314	north of Hebden Bridge
Lumsdale Waterfall	Bentley Brook	SK3160	north east of Matlock

=== M ===
Waterfall name	River or stream	OS Grid ref.	general location
Maizebeck Force	Maize Beck	NY802272	near Cow Green Reservoir
Mallyan Spout	West Beck	NZ824009	near Goathland
Middle Force (Aysgarth Falls)	River Ure	SE012887	near Aysgarth, Wensleydale
Mill Force	River Greta	NY991132	near Bowes
Mill Scar Lash	River Wharfe	SD979664	south of Conistone
Molly's Waterfall	Olchon Brook	SO285352	south west of Black Hill (Herefordshire)
Moss Force	Moss Beck	NY193174	east of Buttermere

=== N to Q ===
Waterfall name	River or stream	OS Grid ref.	General location
Nelly Ayre Foss	West Beck	SE813996	near Goathland
Nelly Force	Apedale Beck?	SE0491	near Castle Bolton
Oakleymill Waterfall	Callow Hollow Brook?	SO429913	Long Mynd
Orgate Force	Marske Beck	NZ090018	near Marske
Park Scar	Cragdale Water	SD912854	near Stalling Busk, Raydale
Pecca Falls	River Twiss	SD695749	north of Ingleton
Pont Burn Waterfall	Pont Burn	NZ146558	east of Medomsley, Durham

=== R ===
Waterfall name	River or stream	OS Grid ref.	general location
Raddick Hill Falls	Devonport Leat	unknown	south of Princetown
Redmire Force	River Ure	SE043900	near Redmire, Wensleydale
Rennie's Linn	Black Burn	NY777932	in Kielder Forest
Richmond Falls	River Swale	NZ173006	in Richmond, North Yorkshire
Ritson's Force	Mosedale Beck	NY185093	near Wasdale Head
Routin Linn	Broomridgedean Burn	NY982367	north of Wooler, 3 miles east of Ford, Northumberland village, next to Broombridgedean Linn, Northumberland
Rowantree Force	Rowantree Gill	SD144937	southeast of Ravenglass
Rowantree Linn	Brockley Burn	NY846883	north of Bellingham
Rutter Force	Hoff Beck	NY682158	near Great Asby

=== S ===
Waterfall name	River or stream	OS Grid ref.	general location
Scale Force	Scale Beck	NY150171	west of Buttermere
Scaleber Force	Scaleber Beck	SD840625	east of Settle
Scaleclose Force	Scaleclose Gill	NY246147	near Rosthwaite, Borrowdale
Scalehow Force	Scalehow Beck	NY414190	west side of Ullswater
Scow Force	River Dee	SD774852	upper Dentdale
Seavy Sike Force	West Gill	SD821959	near Cotterdale
Shanklin Chine	Shanklin		Isle of Wight
Shavercombe Falls	River Plym	unknown	north of Ivybridge
Short Gill Waterfall	Short Gill	SD673846	east side of Barbondale
Smales Leap	Smales Burn	NY717845	near Falstone, Kielder Forest
Smeltmill Waterfall	Smeltmill Beck	NY855150	east of Brough, Cumbria
Smiddy Linn	Bellion Sike	NY966927	near Elsdon and Harwood Forest
Snow Falls (Waterfall)	River Doe	SD704743	north of Ingleton
Spout Force	Aiken Beck	NY181260	near Whinlatter Pass
Spout Linn	Spout Sike	NY610947	in Kielder Forest
Stainforth Force	River Ribble	SD818672	near Stainforth
Stanley Force	tributary of River Esk	SD174995	south side of Eskdale
Startling Fall	New Close Gill	SD897849	near Raydale
Stevenson's Piece	Kirk Moor Beck or Ramsdale Beck	NZ923032	west of Robin Hood's Bay
Stock Ghyll Force	Stock Ghyll	NY385045	near Ambleside

=== T ===
Waterfall name	River or stream	OS Grid ref.	general location
Taylorgill Force	Styhead Gill	NY229109	near Seathwaite, Borrowdale
The Cascades	River Dart	unknown	near Holne
The Force	Force Beck	NY798226	near Mickle Fell
The Forces	Measand Beck	NY485155	west of Haweswater Reservoir
The Forces	tributary of Deepdale Beck	NY373122	east of Fairfield
The Linn	Lisles Burn	NY934863	near Redesdale
The Waterfall	East Dart River	unknown	near Postbridge
Thomason Foss	Eller Beck	S825022	near Goathland
Thornthwaite Force	Haweswater Beck	NY511160	below dam of Haweswater Reservoir
Thornton Force	River Twiss	SD694753	north of Ingleton
Tonguegill Force	Tongue Gill	NY338096	north of Ambleside
Turn Wheel	Rookhope Burn	NY948398	near Eastgate, Weardale

=== U to Z ===
Waterfall name	River or stream	OS Grid ref.	General location
Wainhope Linn	Plashetts Burn	NY665923	in Kielder Forest
Wain Wath Force	River Swale	NY883015	near Keld, Swaledale
Water Ling Force	unknown watercourse	SD943866	south of Bainbridge
White Force	Black Ark?	NY852280	in Teesdale
White Spout	Whitespout Gutter	SD579605	Forest of Bowland
White Lady Waterfall or Whitelady Waterfall	River Lyd	SX501835	near Lydford, Devon
Whorneyside Force	Buscoe Sike	NY261054	east of Crinkle Crags
Yealm Steps	River Yealm	SX617637	north of Ivybridge

== See also ==
- List of waterfalls

Waterfalls of the UK
Waterfalls of Scotland
Waterfalls of Wales
