= List of waterfalls in the United Kingdom =

This is a links page to the named waterfalls found in the UK and includes a list of the highest waterfalls.

== Highest waterfalls in the UK ==
The list of highest waterfalls is often controversial, due to the ambiguity of whether to measure the single largest fall or the sum of a series of falls, and many falls make false claims to the record. This table lists above-ground waterfalls by tallest single drop (not necessarily unbroken).

Waterfall	Location		Height (metres)
1	Eas a' Chual Aluinn	Scotland	200
2	Steall waterfall	Scotland	120
3	Falls of Glomach	Scotland	113
4	Devil's Appendix	Wales	93
5	Pistyll y Llyn	Wales	91
6	Cautley Spout	England	76
7	Pistyll Rhaeadr	Wales	73
8	Canonteign Falls	England	70
9	Falls of Foyers	Scotland	62
10	Cauldron Snout	England	60

== List of waterfalls ==
=== England ===
A more complete list of waterfalls in England is available at List of waterfalls of England.

- Aira Force
- Ashgill Force
- Aysgarth Falls
- Becky Falls
- Broada Falls
- Canonteign Falls
- Catrake Force
- Catrigg Force
- Cauldron Falls
- Cautley Spout
- Clampitt Falls
- Colwith Force
- Cotter Force
- Doe Tor Falls
- East Gill Force
- Esk Falls
- Falling Foss
- Gaping Gill
- Golitha Falls
- Carmine Falls
- Gordale Scar
- Hardraw Force
- Hareshaw Linn
- Hellgill Force
- High Force
- Hindhope Linn
- Hollowbrook Waterfall
- Horeshoe Falls
- Ingleton Falls
- Janet's Foss
- Kinder Downfall
- Kisdon Force
- Lady Exmouth Falls
- Linton Falls
- Lodore Falls
- Low Force
- Mallyan Spout
- Moss Force
- Old Trafford Waterfall
- Pecca Falls
- Raddick Hill Falls
- Richmond Falls
- Ritson's Force
- Rival Falls
- Routin Linn
- Rutter Force
- Rydal Falls
- Scale Force
- Scaleber Force
- Shanklin Chine
- Shavercombe Falls
- Sherrycombe Waterfall
- Skelwith Force
- Stainforth Force
- Stanley Force
- Summerhill Force
- Taylorgill Force
- The Cascades
- Thornton Force
- Wain Wath Force
- Whitelady Waterfall
- Stock Ghyll Force
- St Audries bay
- St Nectan's Glen

=== Scotland ===
A more complete list of waterfalls in Scotland is available at List of waterfalls in Scotland.

- Eas a' Chual Aluinn
- Eas an Fhir Mhoir, River Etive
- Eas Bàn (on tributary of Machrie Water, Arran)
- Eas Coire nan Choire, Kinlochhourn
- Eas Mòr (Auchenhew, Arran)
- Easan Laogh, tributary of River Creran
- Falls of Bruar
- Falls of Dochart
- Falls of Foyers
- Falls of Moness
- Glenashdale Falls (or Eas a' Chranaig), Whiting Bay, Arran
- Grey Mare's Tail, Moffat
- Grey Mare's Tail, Kinlochmore
- Linn of Avon, Cairngorm Mountains
- Linn of Dee, Inverey
- Linn of Quoich, Braemar
- Plodda Falls, Glen Affric
- Rogie Falls
- Spout of Garnock
- Steall Waterfall

=== Wales ===
A more complete list of waterfalls in Wales is available at List of waterfalls of Wales.

- Aber Falls, Abergwyngregyn
- Cenarth Falls, River Teifi
- Conwy Falls
- Dolgoch Falls
- Dyserth Falls
- Ffrwd Fawr, Powys
- Pwll-y-Gerwyn
- The Grey Mare's Tail
- Henrhyd Waterfall
- Horseshoe Falls
- Llech Sychryd, tributary of Afon Cynon
- Machno falls, Afon Machno
- Melincourt Falls
- Mynach Falls, Afon Mynach
- Pistyll Cain, Afon Gain
- Pistyll Du, tributary of Afon Gain
- Pistyll Gwyn, Afon Crawcwellt
- Pistyll Gwyn, Afon Pumryd, River Dovey
- Pistyll Henfynachlog, Afon Eiddon, Afon Wnion
- Pistyll y Llyn, Llyfnant
- Pistyll Rhaeadr
- Pistyll Rhyd-y-meinciau, Afon Eiddew
- Pistyll y Gaseg, Porth Ysgo Gwynedd
- Pwll y Crochan, Sychryd
- Rhaeadr-bach, Aber
- Rhaeadr Cynfal, Afon Cynfal
- Rhaeadr y Cwm, Afon Cynfal
- Rhaeadr Du, Afon Prysor
- Rhaeadr Du, Afon Gamlan
- Rhaeadr Mawddach, Afon Mawddach
- Rhaeadr Ogwen, Afon Ogwen
- Sgwd Clun-gwyn
- Sgwd Ddwli Isaf
- Sgwd Ddwli Uchaf
- Sgwd Isaf Clun-gwyn
- Sgwd Einion Gam
- Sgwd Gwladus
- Sgwd y Bedol
- Sgwd yr Eira
- Sgwd y Pannwr
- Swallow Falls, Afon Llugwy

=== Northern Ireland ===
Waterfalls in Northern Ireland.

- Ess na Larach, Glenariff Forest Park
- Ess na Crub, Inver River, Glenariff Forest Park

== See also ==
- Geography of the United Kingdom
- List of waterfalls
