= Ashgill Force =

Waterfall in Cumbria, England

Coordinates: 54.7587°N 2.3765°W

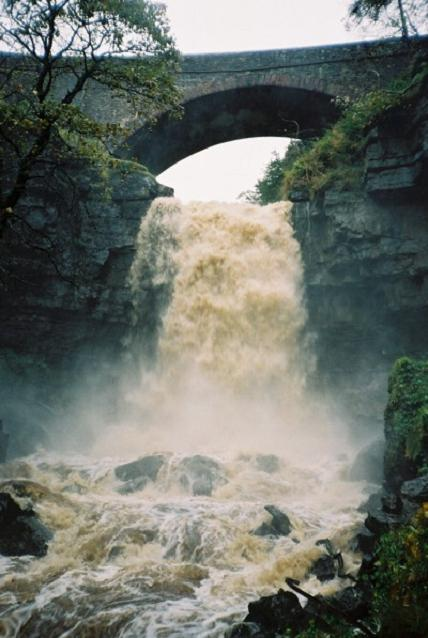
Ashgill Force after heavy rain

Ashgill Force is a waterfall near Alston, Cumbria, England.

The fall is located on Ashgill Beck and is reasonably easily accessible from the B6277 (which crosses a bridge over the beck just above the falls) or from Garrigill village, downstream of the fall. The beck downstream of the main fall is attractive in its own right and features several small cascades. It is a home to several wildlife species, including a much loved staple of British streams - dippers. There are ruins of former industrial buildings nearby, possibly from lead working, which the area was once famous for.

While less popular than nearby High Force, Hardraw Force and Cauldron Snout, Ashgill Force is nonetheless an impressive fall, plunging 55 feet over a rocky shelf. A visit to this fall will likely be more tranquil than one to its aforementioned more famous neighbours, as it attracts less tourists to obscure the view. The fall is comparable to the higher Hardraw Force. Arguably Ashgill Force has a greater volume of water tumbling over it. The shelf behind the fall is also much more easily accessible than at Hardraw. Indeed, access behind Hardraw Force is now officially prohibited. Given the forces present on an overhanging cliff with a waterfall, it is perhaps inadvisable to traverse the rear of any unfamiliar fall. Certainly, anyone who does makes that move at their own risk.

== See also ==
- List of waterfalls
- List of waterfalls in England
