= Low Force =

Set of waterfalls in Northern England

Coordinates: 54°38′49″N 2°9′5″W

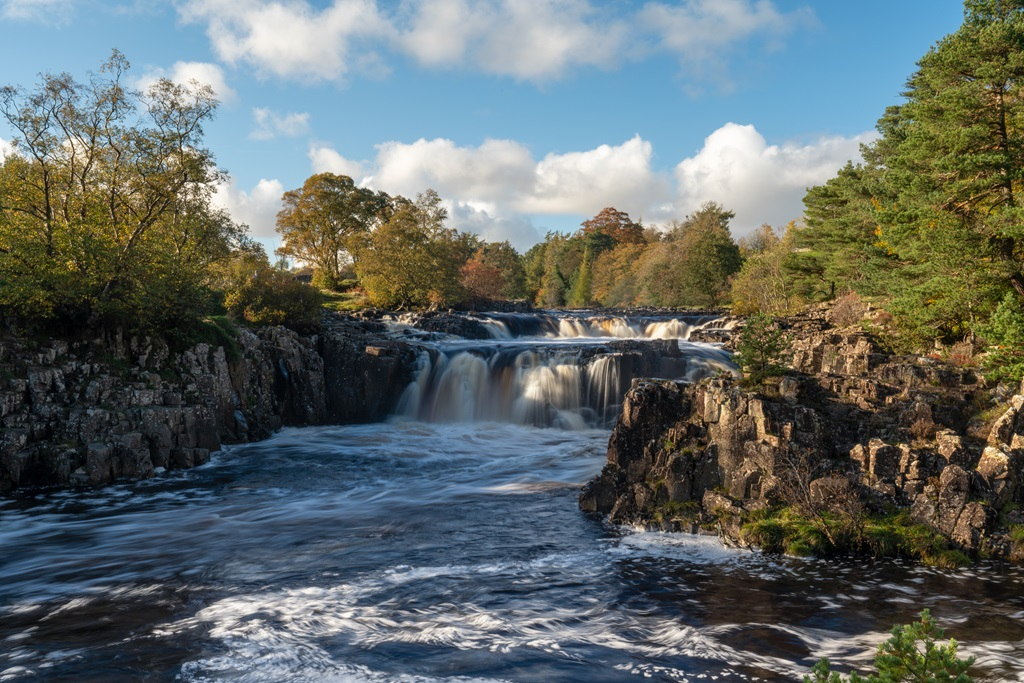
Low Force

Low Force is an 18-foot (5.5m) high set of falls on the River Tees, England, UK. Further upstream is the High Force waterfall. Low Force is also the site of the Wynch Bridge, completed in 1830. It is suggested by signs at each end that only one person at a time should cross the bridge as it may be unstable.

== Geography ==
Low Force is within the North Pennines Area of Outstanding Natural Beauty (AONB) and European Geopark. Low Force lies on the historic county boundary between the North Riding of Yorkshire on the south bank, and County Durham on the north bank; since the local government reforms of 1974, however, the south bank of the Tees in Teesdale has also been included within County Durham for administrative purposes.

== In popular culture ==
Sections of the film 1917 were shot near the site in June 2019. The production staff had to install signs warning walkers in the area not to be alarmed at the prosthetic bodies strewn around the site.

In 2020 production crews arrived on the banks of the Tees to film scenes for the popular Netflix series 'The Witcher' with Low Force featuring in episode seven of season two.

== See also ==
- List of waterfalls
- List of waterfalls in the United Kingdom
