= Pistyll Rhaeadr =

- Llanrhaeadr Waterfall
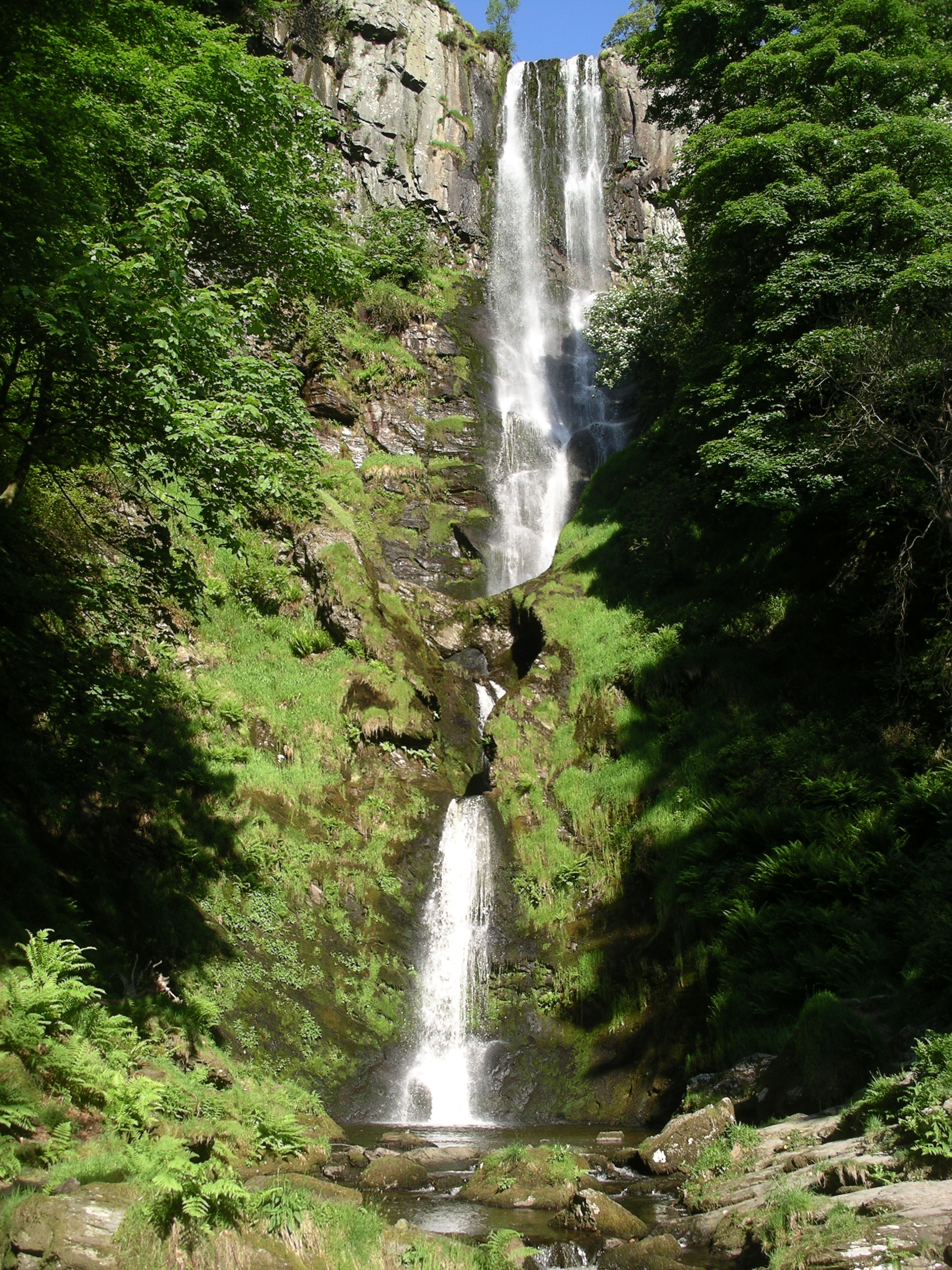
- Pistyll Rhaeadr. Note the natural arch in the middle.

- Location within Wales
- Location: Llanrhaeadr-ym-Mochnant, Powys, Wales
- OS grid: SJ 0726 2951
- Coordinates: 52°51′17.97″N 3°22′42.74″W
- Type: Plunge
- Total height: 240 ft (73 m)

Pistyll Rhaeadr (Welsh pronunciation: [pɪstɨ̞ɬ r̥eɨ̯adr], meaning "waterfall (of) Rhaeadr" (Note: i.e. the waterfall at the head of the Rhaeadr. The river name itself is from rhaeadr = "waterfall".)) is a waterfall 4 miles (6 kilometres) from the village of Llanrhaeadr-ym-Mochnant in Powys, Wales, and 16 miles (26 kilometres) west of Oswestry.

== Description ==
Pistyll Rhaeadr is formed by the Afon Disgynfa (disgynfa also means "waterfall") falling, in three stages, over a 240-foot (73 m) cliff-face formed from Ordovician mudstones and tuffs, below which the river is known as the Afon Rhaeadr. The tallest stage is estimated at 40 metres (130 ft). It is counted as one of the Seven Wonders of Wales and is a Site of Special Scientific Interest. The 19th-century author George Borrow, in his book Wild Wales, remarked of the waterfall: "What shall I liken it to? I scarcely know, unless it is to an immense skein of silk agitated and disturbed by tempestuous blasts, or to the long tail of a grey courser at furious speed. I never saw water falling so gracefully, so much like thin, beautiful threads as here."

There is car-parking space near the foot of the waterfall for people who want to explore the waterfall, with a café and a B&B alongside.

The waterfall is often referred to by the media, government sources, and other sources as the tallest in Wales or the tallest single drop in the United Kingdom. However, it is not a single drop, and both its single drop height and its total height are surpassed by both the Devil's Appendix and Pistyll y Llyn, as well as several other waterfalls.

== See also ==
- List of waterfalls
- List of waterfalls in Wales
- List of waterfalls of the United Kingdom
