= White Spout (disambiguation) =

White Spout is a waterfall in East Dunbartonshire, Scotland.

White Spout may also refer to:

- Steall Waterfall, which is called "The White Spout" in Gaelic
- Whitespout Linn, a waterfall in Scotland
