= Afon Llyfnant =

River in Wales

Coordinates: 52.55°N 3.937°W

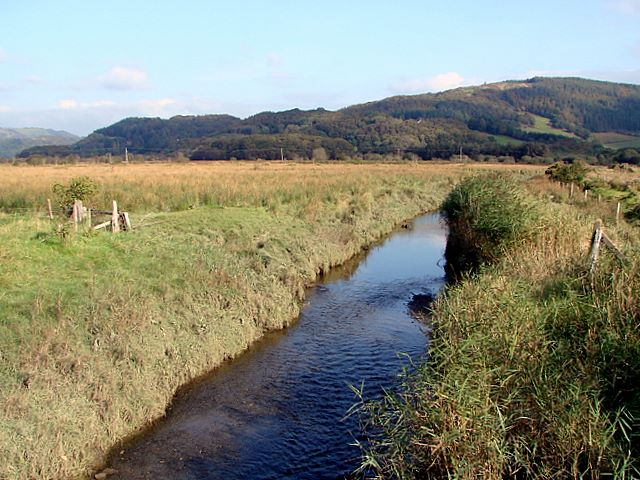
- Afon Llyfnant near Eglwys Fach

Location
- Country: Wales

Physical characteristics
- Source: Llyn Eiddwen

The Afon Llyfnant, also known as the River Llyfnant, is a short river in Ceredigion, on the west coast of Wales. The river rises in the mountains south of Machynlleth, reaches the hill walk of Uwch Garreg and then plunges over a series of waterfalls known as Pistyll y Llyn, into a ravine, descending towards the River Dyfi (or Dovey) near Dovey Junction railway station.

== Course ==
The Llyfnant rises at Llyn Penrhaiadr in the Uwch Garreg mountains south of Machynlleth. It flows northwards through mountainous scenery for about three miles, before suddenly coming to the edge of the escarpment and plunging into a ravine in a series of waterfalls and cascades known as Pistyll y Llyn, descending abruptly from 370 to 210 metres (1,210 to 690 ft). At a more leisurely pace, it now begins to curve gradually towards the west and passes the hamlet of Gellifudr at the end of the first unclassified road it has encountered. Continuing in a generally western direction with the road on its right bank, it passes through woodland and is bridged for the first time at the hamlet of Glaspwll by a minor road that goes north to Machynlleth. The road is now on its left bank as it continues westwards through a steep-sided valley with woodland on either side. Reaching more level ground, it flows under the A487 road at Pont Llyfnant and under the Cambrian Coast Line from Shrewsbury to Aberystwyth close to Dovey Junction railway station, before joining the River Dovey about one mile inland from its estuary. The total length of the river is about ten miles.

== Wildlife ==
The river is the haunt of dippers, and red kites can often be seen circling overhead.
