= Ingleton Waterfalls Trail =

Nature trail in North Yorkshire, England

Coordinates: 54°9.26′N 2°28.28′W

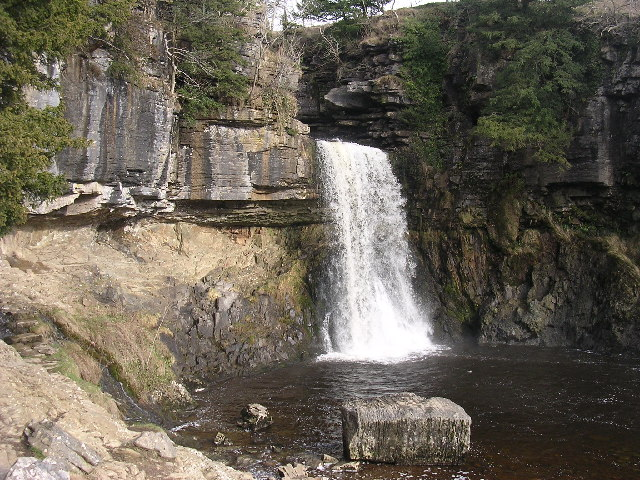
- Thornton Force
- Length: 8 km (5.0 mi)
- Location: Ingleton, North Yorkshire, England
- Trailheads: Ingleton, North Yorkshire (circular)
- Use: Hiking
- Highest point: 285 metres (934 ft)
- Difficulty: Easy to Moderate
- Season: All year
- Maintained by: Ingleton Scenery Company Limited

Ingleton Waterfalls Trail is a well-known circular trail beginning and ending in the village of Ingleton in the English county of North Yorkshire, now maintained by the Ingleton Scenery Company. It is claimed that the trail, some 8 kilometres (5 mi) long, and with a vertical rise of 169 m (554 feet) has some of the most spectacular waterfall and woodland scenery in the north of England. It is on private land and an entrance fee is charged.

== Beginnings ==
Following a number of articles in the Lancaster Guardian and other newspapers about the scenery in and around Ingleton, public interest led to the creation of the trail in an area which was previously hidden from view. Paths and bridges were built and the trail opened on Good Friday, 11 April 1885. The presence of Ingleton railway station played a major role in the early success of the trail, attracting visitors from Bradford, Manchester and Leeds.

== Geology ==
Cross section of the geology of the River Twiss section of the walk

Ingleton lies on the North and South Craven fault, exposing Carboniferous and Ordovician rocks. The Ingletonian rock has been classified as Ordovician.

== The walk ==
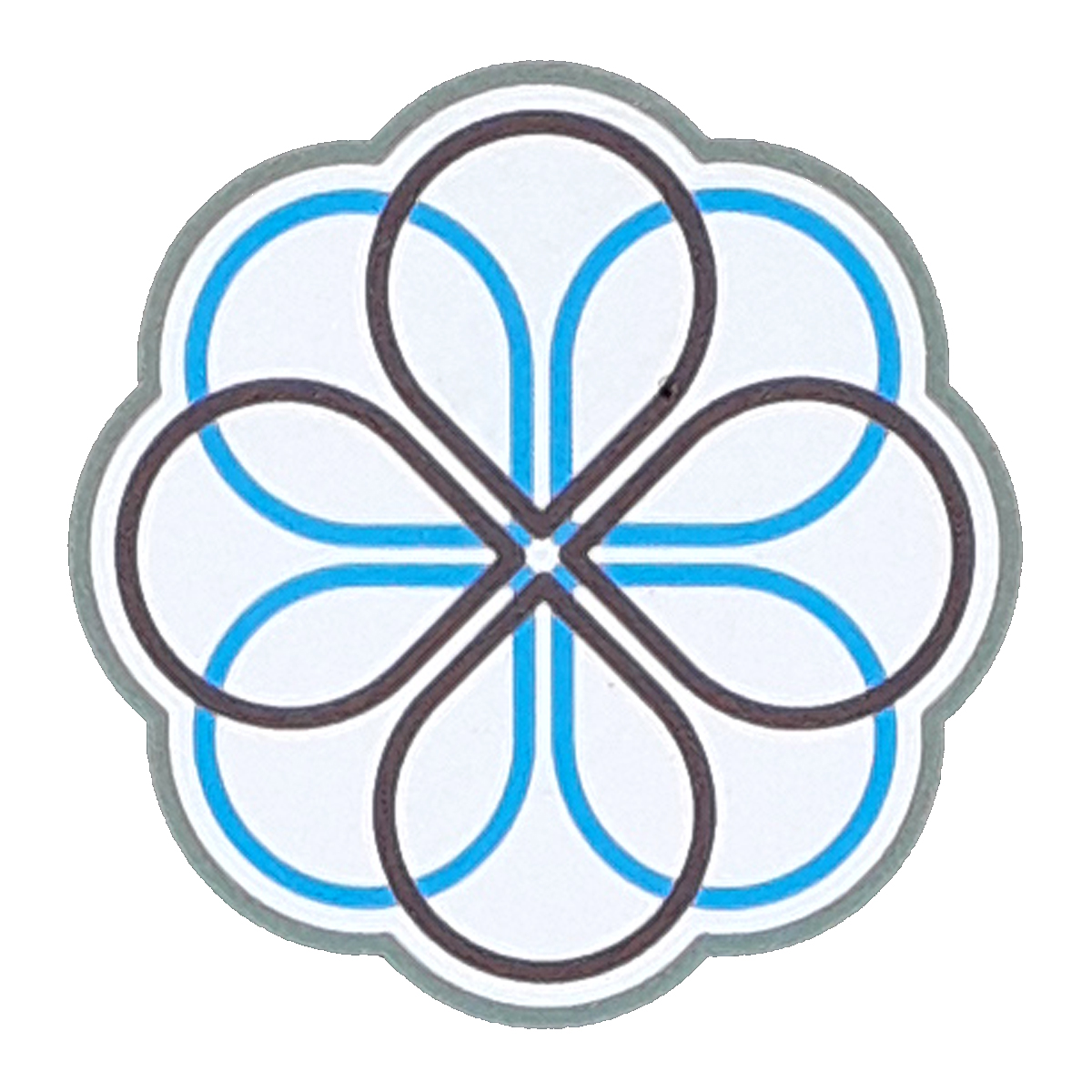
Ingleton Waterfalls Trail symbol

Starting in the Broadwood car park the trail takes walkers along the banks of the River Twiss, through Swilla Glenn with its coin embedded tree and on to Pecca Falls, Pecca Twin Falls, Holly Bush Spout and Thornton Force. A footbridge bridge crosses the Twiss and leads on to Twistleton Lane, which crosses out of the valley of the River Twiss at 285 metres (934 ft). Following Twistleton Lane down past Scar End Farm and Twistleton Hall the walk crosses Oddies Lane to Beezley's Farm.

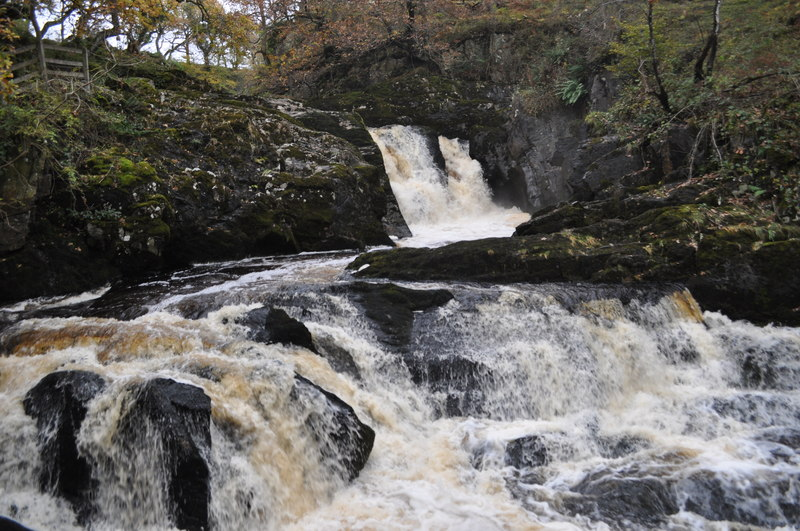
Beezley Falls

Past Beezley's the trail starts its descent along the banks of the River Doe. This river emerges near God's Bridge close to the settlement of Chapel-le-Dale and flows gently until it reaches the waterfalls walk at Beezley's Falls Triple Spout (with its three waterfalls side-by side). As the trail continues, you look down 18 metres (59 feet) onto Rival Falls and then onto Baxenghyll Gorge, Snow Falls and finally walk through Twistleton Glen and back to Ingleton.

In Ingleton, the Twiss and the Doe meet to form the River Greta, which in turn flows into the River Lune.

English Nature designated the River Twiss and River Doe areas of the Waterfalls Trail as a Site of Special Scientific Interest (SSSI) due to the interesting plants and animals and the geological structures located there.

== See also ==
- List of waterfalls
- List of waterfalls in England
