= Scar End =

Hamlet in North Yorkshire, England

Coordinates: 54°10′15″N 2°27′32″W

Scar End is a settlement on the side of Twisleton Scar in the English county of North Yorkshire.

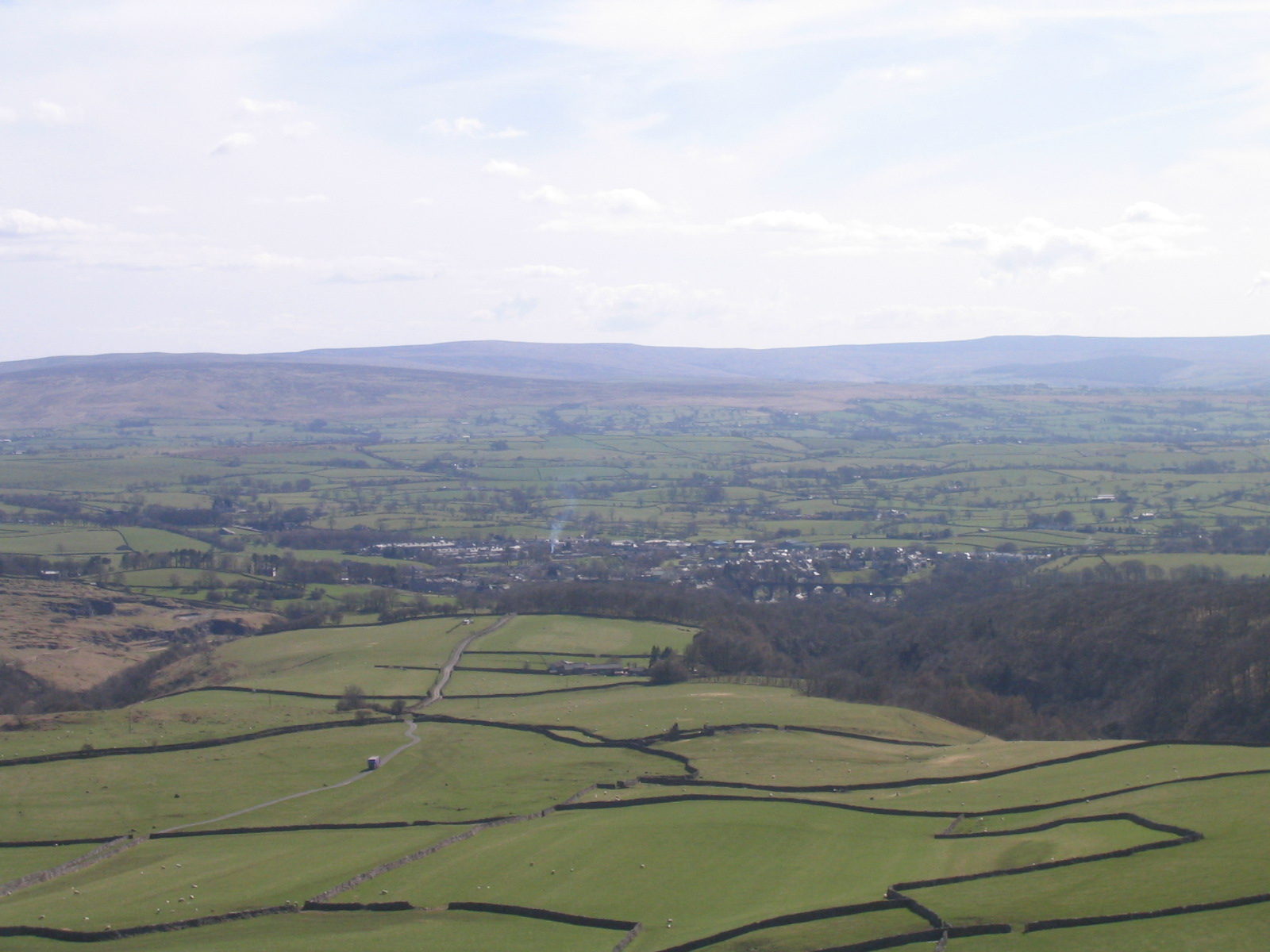
Ingleton, taken from Scar End

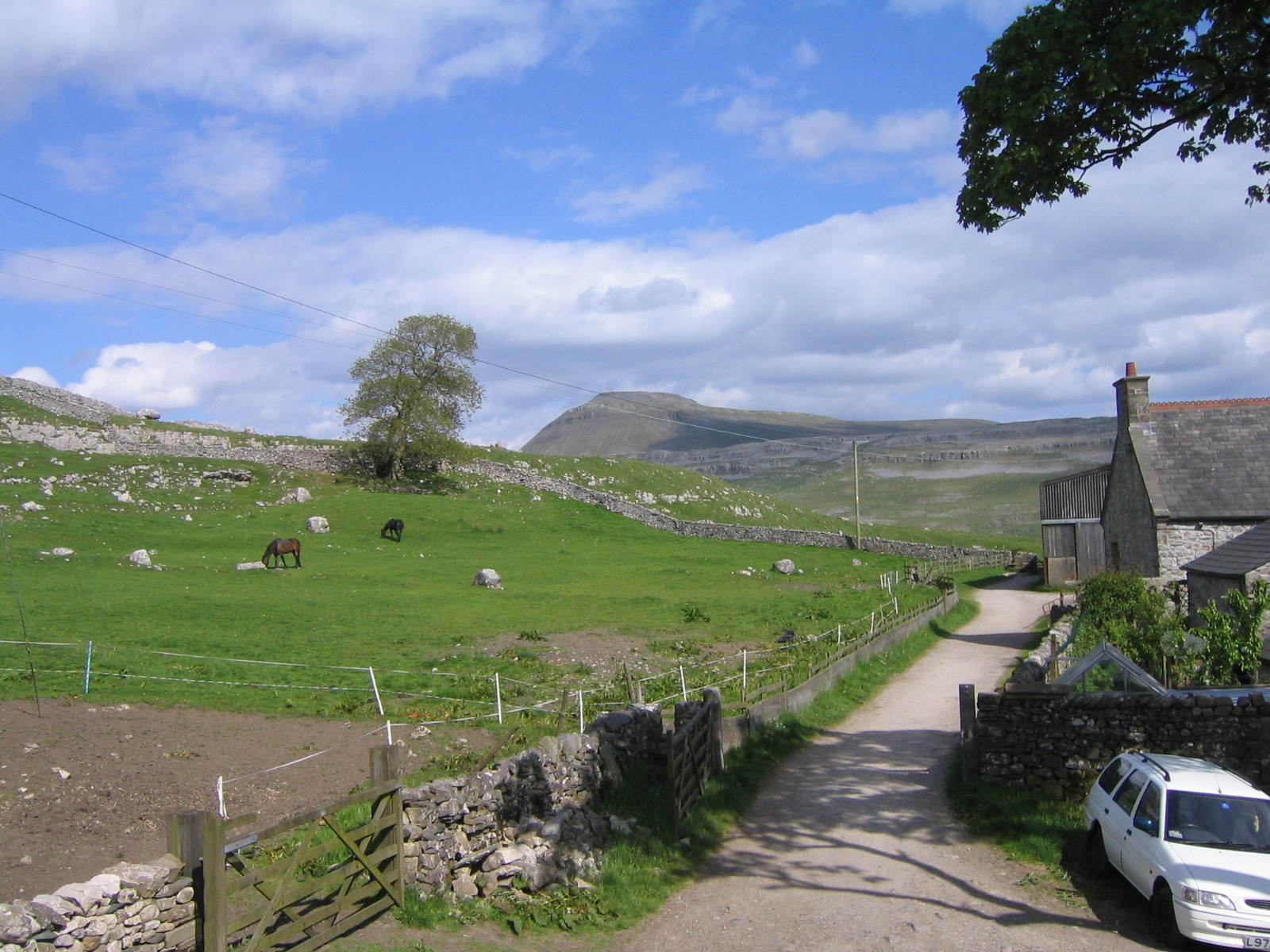
Ingleborough, taken from Scar End

This Scar itself is the end of a spur running westwards from Whernside, one of the Three Peaks, towards Ingleton, North Yorkshire, and the beds of limestone project to a height of 120 metres (390 ft) above sea level. Looking out towards the west from Twisleton Scar is Ingleton, to the South, is Ingleborough, and to the north is the view up the Kingsdale valley. The settlement consists of a handful of buildings, one of which is Twisleton Hall. The road into the settlement leaves the old Roman Road from Ingleton (Oddies Lane) into Chapel-le-Dale.

Visitors walking the Ingleton Waterfalls Trail will approach Scar End by walking along Twisleton Lane. Twisleton is spelled as Twisleton on OS maps and in most sources; however, some sources spell the placename Twistleton.
