= Beck Hole SSSI =

Protected area in North Yorkshire, England

Coordinates: 54.404117°N 0.73366116°W

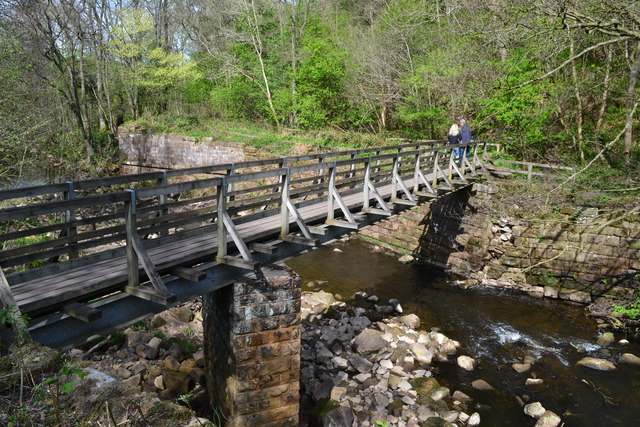
Path into Blue Ber Wood

Beck Hole is a Site of Special Scientific Interest (SSSI) within North York Moors National Park in North Yorkshire, England. This protected area includes separate woodland patches within the valleys of Wheeldale, Eller Beck and Middle Grain Beck around the villages of Goathland, Beck Hole and Darnholm and includes Blue Ber Wood, Bradley Wood, Mill Scar Wood and the waterfall called Mallyan Spout. This area is protected because of the woodlands within ravines.

== Biology ==
Herbaceous species in the woodlands include wood sorrel, opposite-leaved golden saxifrage and marsh hawk's-beard. In Blue Ber Wood, herbaceous species include dog's mercury, water avens, sanicle, wild daffodil and alternate-leaved golden saxifrage.

In patches of peatland, plant species include bog asphodel, sundew and lesser twayblade. In neutral grassland, plant species include devil's-bit-scabious, betony, knapweed, common spotted orchid, pignut and primrose.

== Land ownership ==
A major landowner that owns land within Beck Hole SSSI is the Duchy of Lancaster.
