= Eas a' Chual Aluinn =

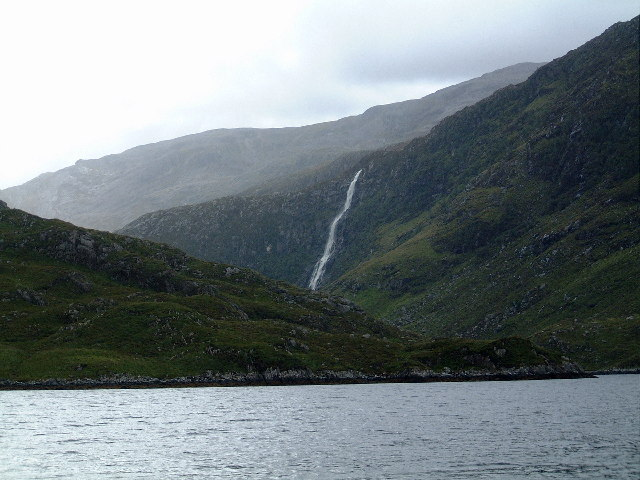
- The falls from Loch Beag

- Location within Scotland
- Location: Assynt, Highland, Scotland
- Coordinates: 58.20537°N 4.92711°W
- Type: Tiered
- Total height: 200 m (660 ft)

Eas a' Chual Aluinn (grid reference NC281278) in the parish of Assynt, Sutherland, Highland, Scotland, is the tallest waterfall in the United Kingdom with a drop of 200 m (660 ft).

The waterfall can be reached by a 6-mile (10-kilometre) walk across boggy ground from the road 3 mi (5 km) south of Kylesku in Sutherland. In good weather, a boat-trip runs from the slipway by the Kylesku Hotel to Loch Beag, from where the waterfall is visible.

The name is a corruption of Scottish Gaelic: Eas a' Chùil Àlainn, ("waterfall of the beautiful tresses").

== See also ==
- List of waterfalls
- List of waterfalls in the United Kingdom
