= Pistyll y Llyn =

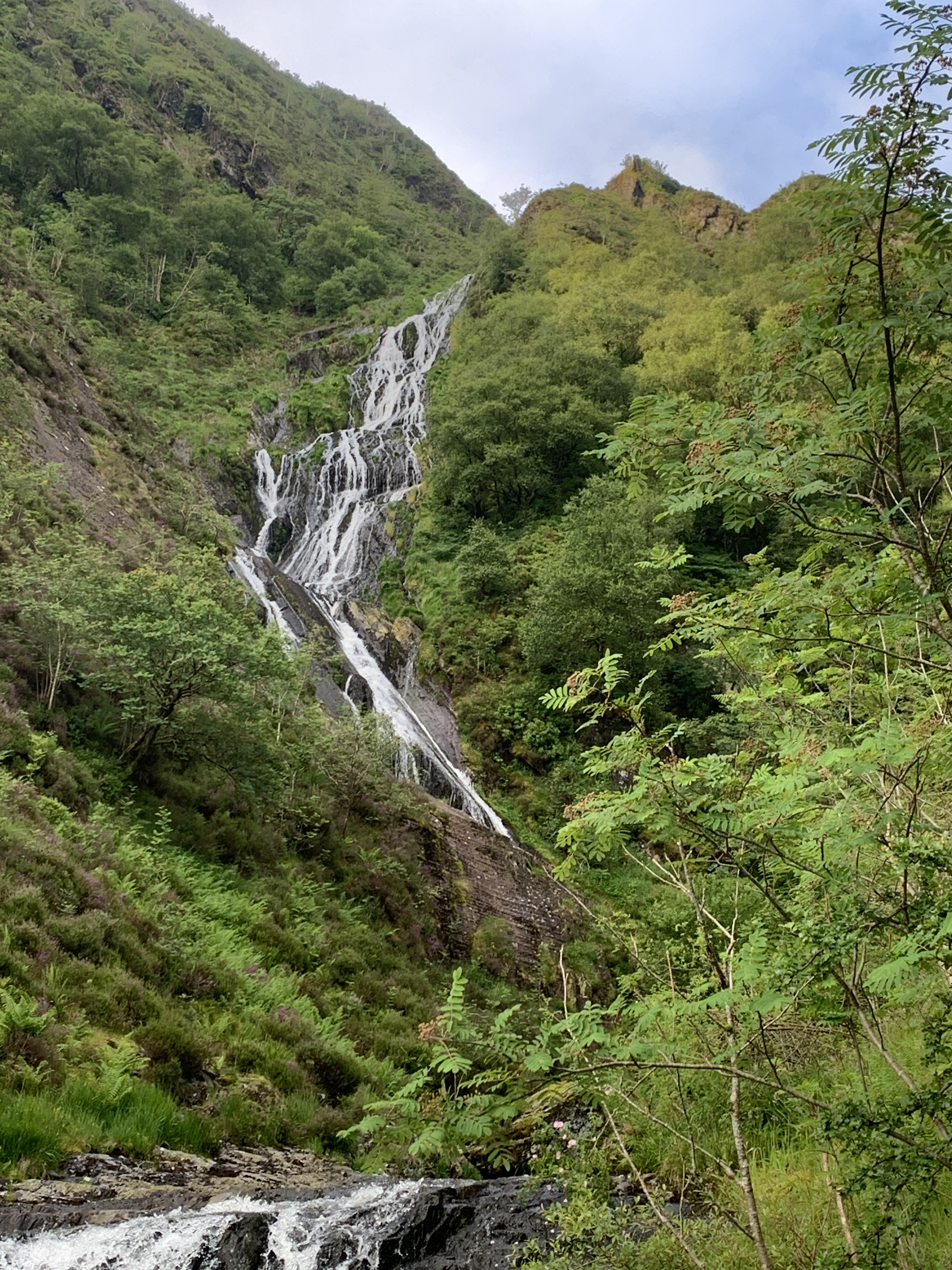

- Location within Wales
- Location: Ysgubor-y-coed, Ceredigion and Cadfarch, Powys, Wales
- OS grid: SN 7536 9420
- Coordinates: 52°31.8822′N 3°50.3053′W
- Total height: 300 ft (91 m)
- Watercourse: Llyfnant

Pistyll y Llyn is one of the tallest waterfalls in Wales and the United Kingdom. It is a horsetail style set of falls which are located in the Cambrian Mountains about 2 1/2 miles (4 kilometres) from Glaspwll in Powys, Wales. Height is a matter of contention in Wales, with many sources claiming that Pistyll Rhaeadr is the tallest waterfall in Wales or the tallest single-drop waterfall in the UK, despite being significantly surpassed in height by Pistyll y Llyn, Devil's Appendix and the waterfall at Nant Maesglase. The flow over the falls is regulated by a weir at the source of the river by the lake, resulting in low flow for most of the year. In the past, the waterfall was known as a popular destination for pilgrims.

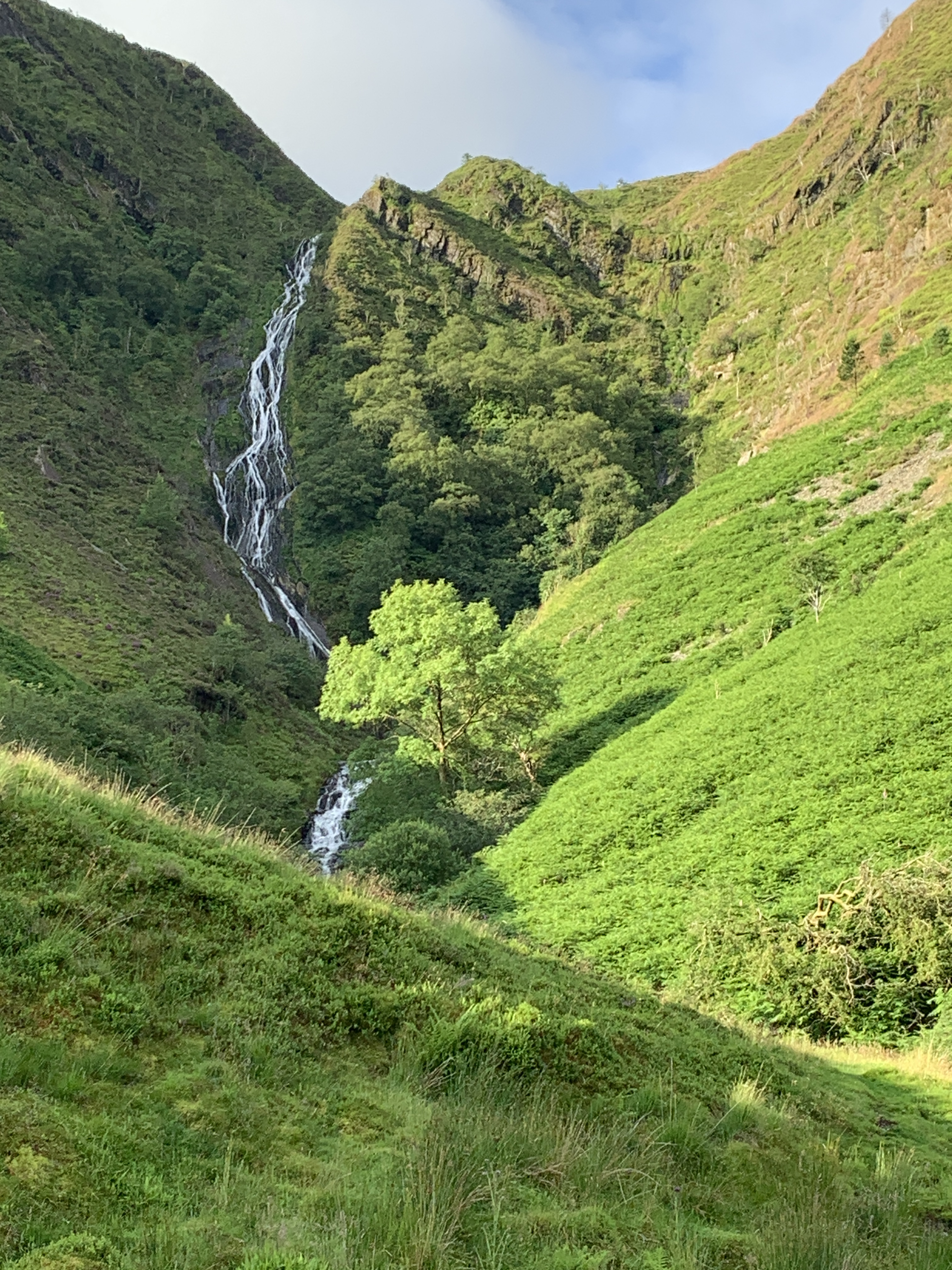
Pistyll y Llyn from the valley

It is formed where the River Llyfnant falls from Llyn Penrhaeadr for approximately 525 feet (160 metres) into Cwm Rhaeadr in two waterfalls, and a series of cascades. The tallest waterfall is a single horsetail drop of 300 ft (91 m). This is sometimes mistakenly stated as 240 ft (73 m). The large horsetail cascade alone surpasses the 73m-tall Pistyll Rhaeadr by a significant margin, in turn slightly surpassed by the 93m high Devil's Appendix and the 160-180m high Nant Maesglase waterfall, which is likely the tallest in Wales. However, all 3 of these waterfalls with the possible exception of Pistyll y Llyn have markedly low water flow at nearly all times, and may not run at all during the summer months.

The waterfall is located on open-access land, with a permissive footpath running to the base of the waterfall from Cwm Rhaeadr. In 2020, most of the land between the waterfall and the village was converted into an intensely managed pheasant shoot. Another public footpath leads uphill to the head of the waterfall overlooking the valley.

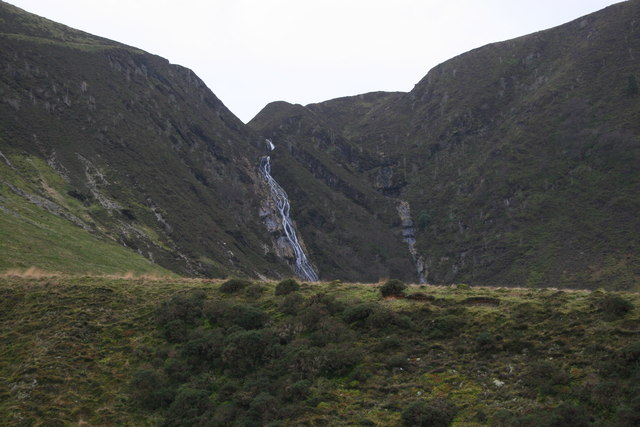
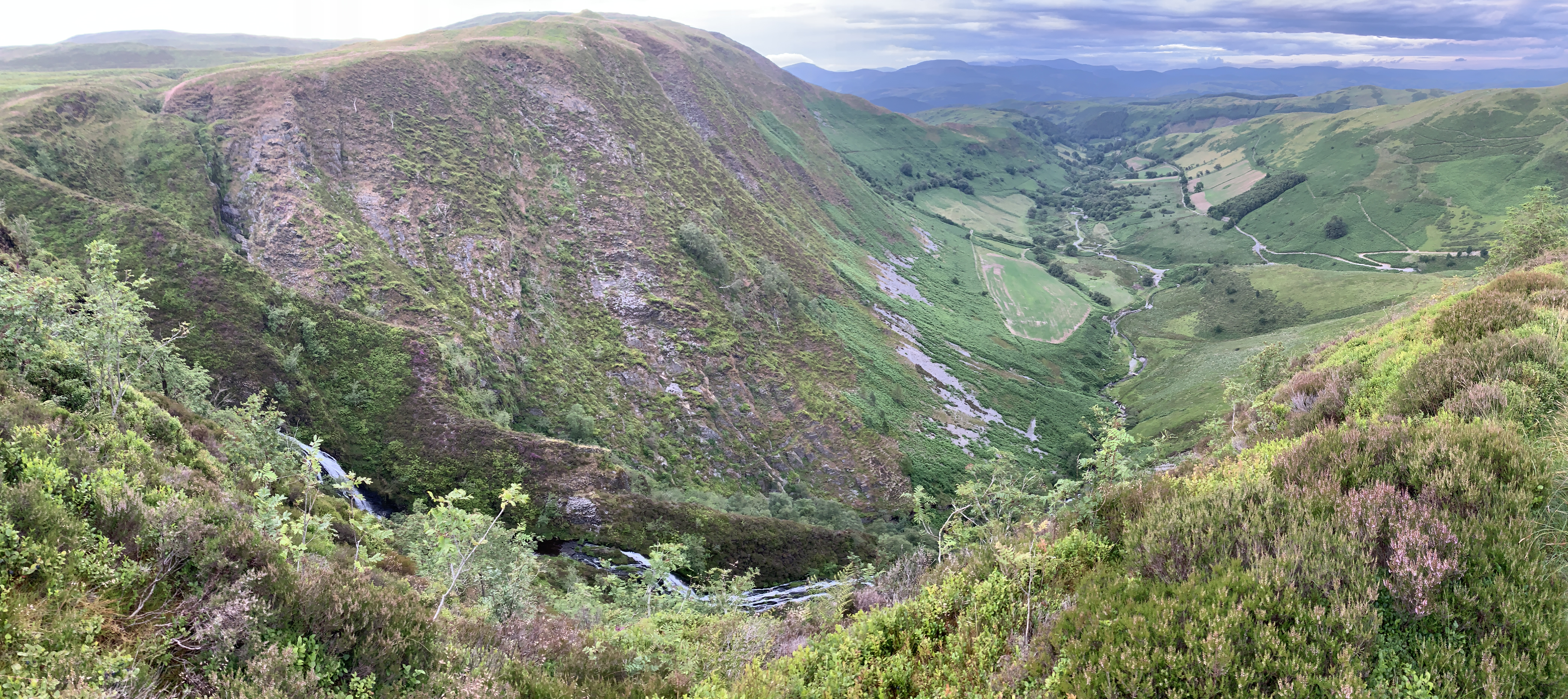
Waterfall from afar (left) and the top (right)

== See also ==
- List of waterfalls
- List of waterfalls in the United Kingdom
- List of waterfalls in Wales
