= Ess na Larach =

Waterfall in County Antrim, Northern Ireland

Coordinates: 55.0169°N 6.103567°W

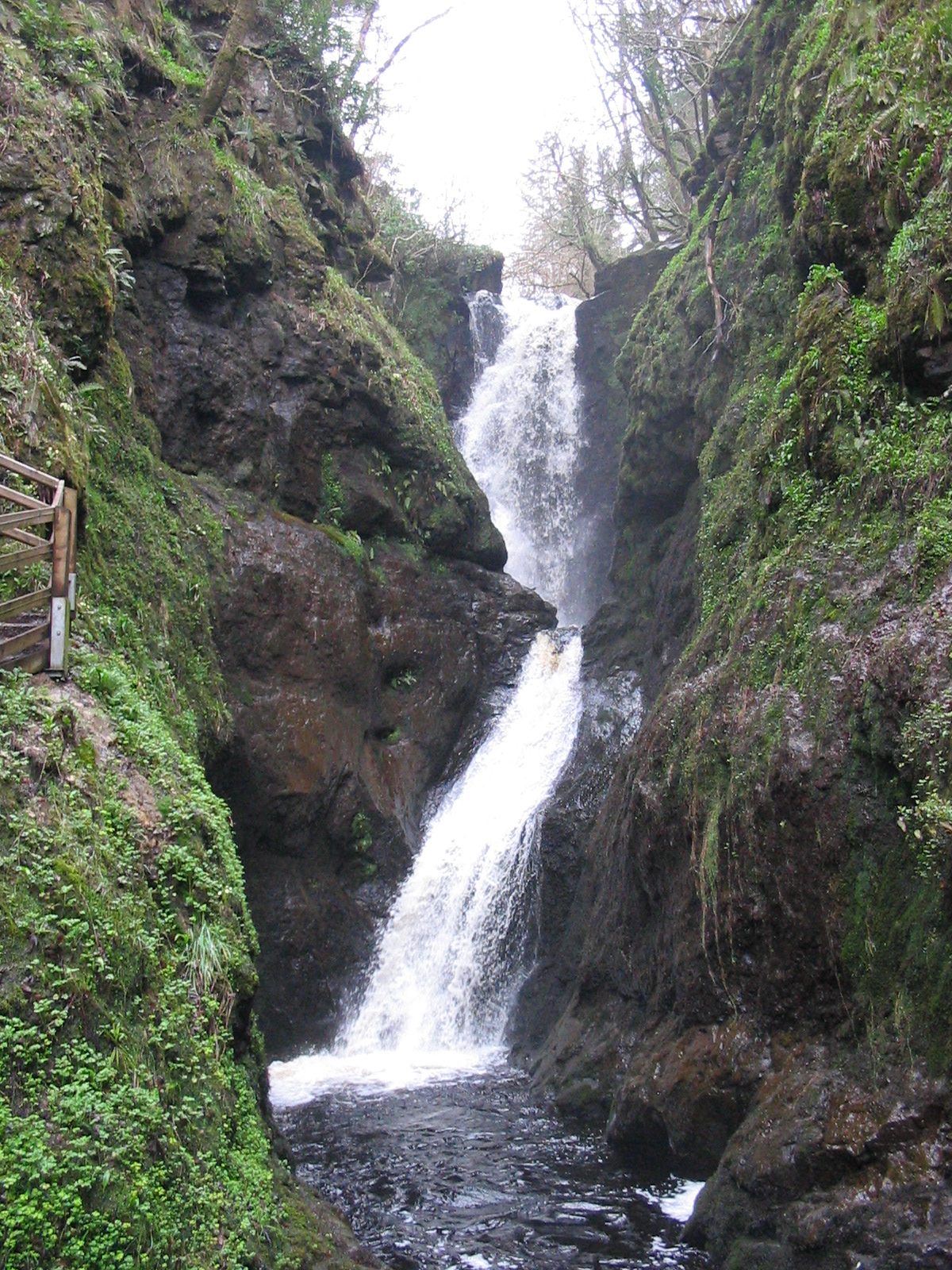
Ess na Larach waterfall

Ess na Larach is a waterfall in Glenariff Forest Park, County Antrim, Northern Ireland. It lies along Glenariff River.

== See also ==
- List of waterfalls
