= Glenariff Forest Park =

Public woodland in County Antrim, Northern Ireland

Coordinates: 55°00′37″N 6°07′14″W

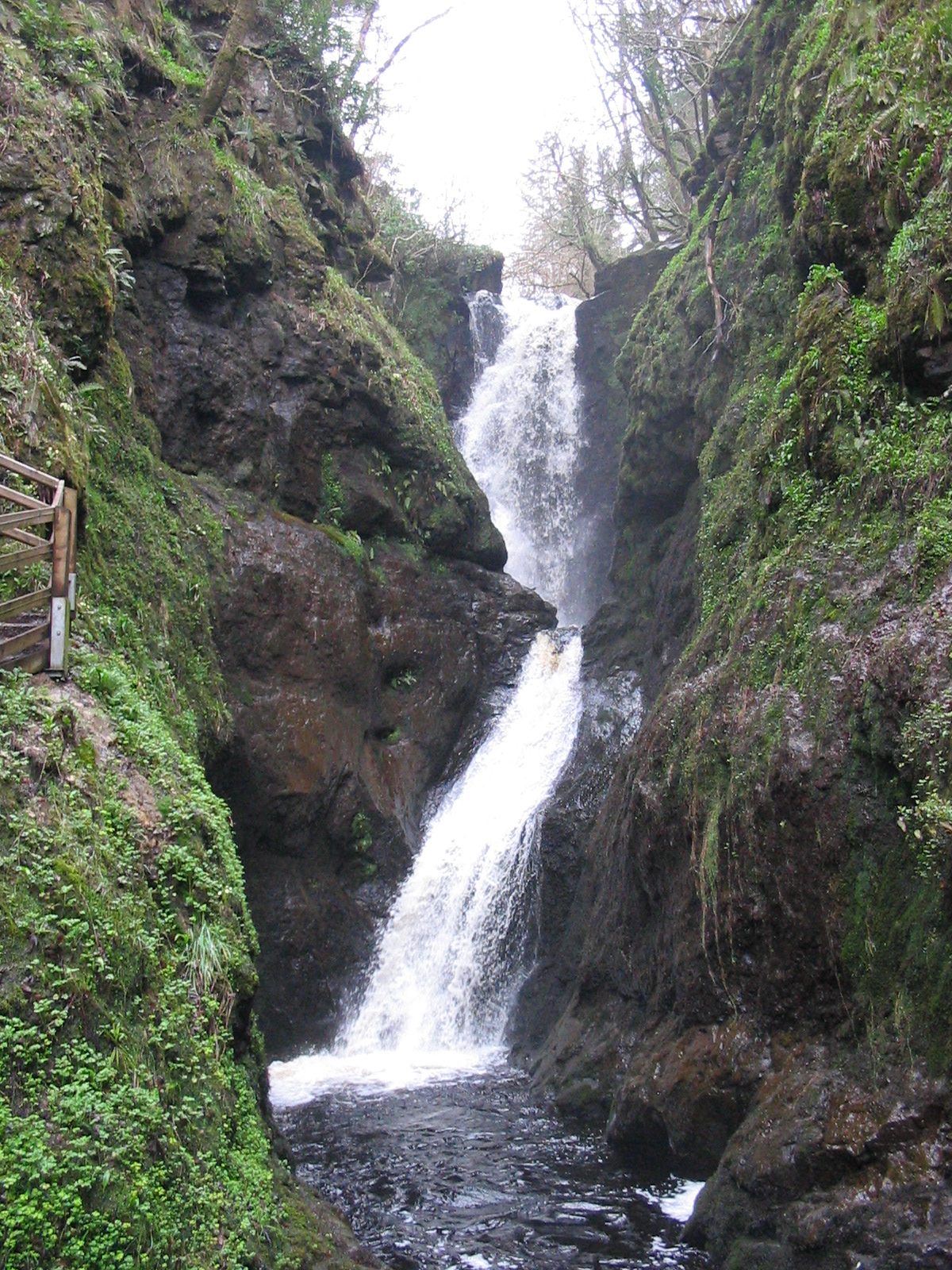
Ess na Larach waterfall in Glenariff Forest Park

Glenariff Forest Park is an 1185 hectare (2928 acre) forest in County Antrim, Northern Ireland. It is part of Glenariff glen itself. The forest is managed by the Northern Ireland Forest Service. The park includes a National Nature Reserve, and a waterfall walkway, along with other amenities including a restaurant, camping site, visitor centre and shop. The park is home to many ferns, liverworts and mosses, as well red squirrels, hen harriers and Irish hares.

== History ==
The park is part of Glenariff glen itself. The forest is managed by the Northern Ireland Forest Service, the state body responsible for forestry in the province, which is part of the Department of Agriculture, Environment and Rural Affairs. It covers 1000 hectares.

== Features ==
The Waterfall Walkway, opened 80 years ago, has been significantly upgraded along its 3-mile length which passes through a National Nature Reserve. There are three waterfalls, several forest trails and riverside walks, as well as a visitor centre, shop, and seasonal caravan/camping site and restaurant. Horseriding is also available in the park. Entry charges apply.

The rocky gorges of the waterfalls support plant life including many ferns, liverworts and mosses, and the waterfall walkway has been designed to allow viewing of these. Wildlife found in the park includes red squirrels, hen harriers and the Irish hare. The park has been designated a National Nature Reserve for this reason.

== Timber production ==
As well as being a recreational resource, the forest is used for timber production centered on the clearfelling of coniferous plantation trees.
