= Steall Waterfall =

- An Steall Bàn
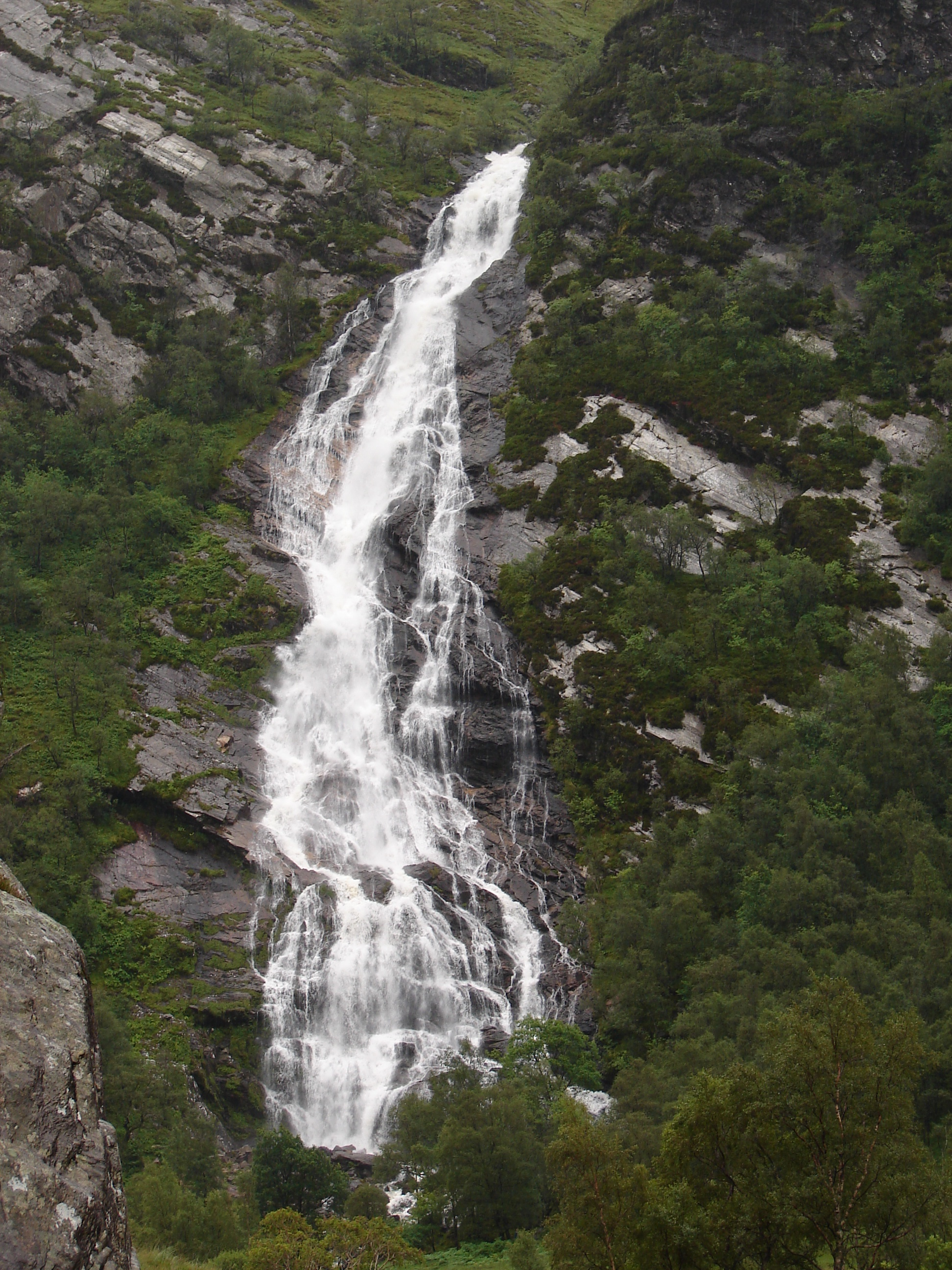
- Steall Waterfall

- Location within Scotland
- Location: Fort William, Highland, Scotland
- Coordinates: 56°46′11″N 4°58′43″W
- Type: Tiered
- Total height: 120 m (390 ft)
- Watercourse: Allt Coire a' Mhail

Steall Waterfall, also known as An Steall Bàn or Steall Falls, is situated in Glen Nevis near Fort William, Highland, Scotland. It is Scotland's second-highest waterfall, with a drop of 120 metres (390 feet). The falls can be viewed from the path that runs through the Nevis Gorge, an area owned by the John Muir Trust which manages the area for its wilderness qualities. An Steall Bàn means "The White Spout" in Gaelic.

== See also ==
- List of waterfalls
- List of waterfalls of the United Kingdom
