= Mallyan Spout =

Waterfall in North Yorkshire, England

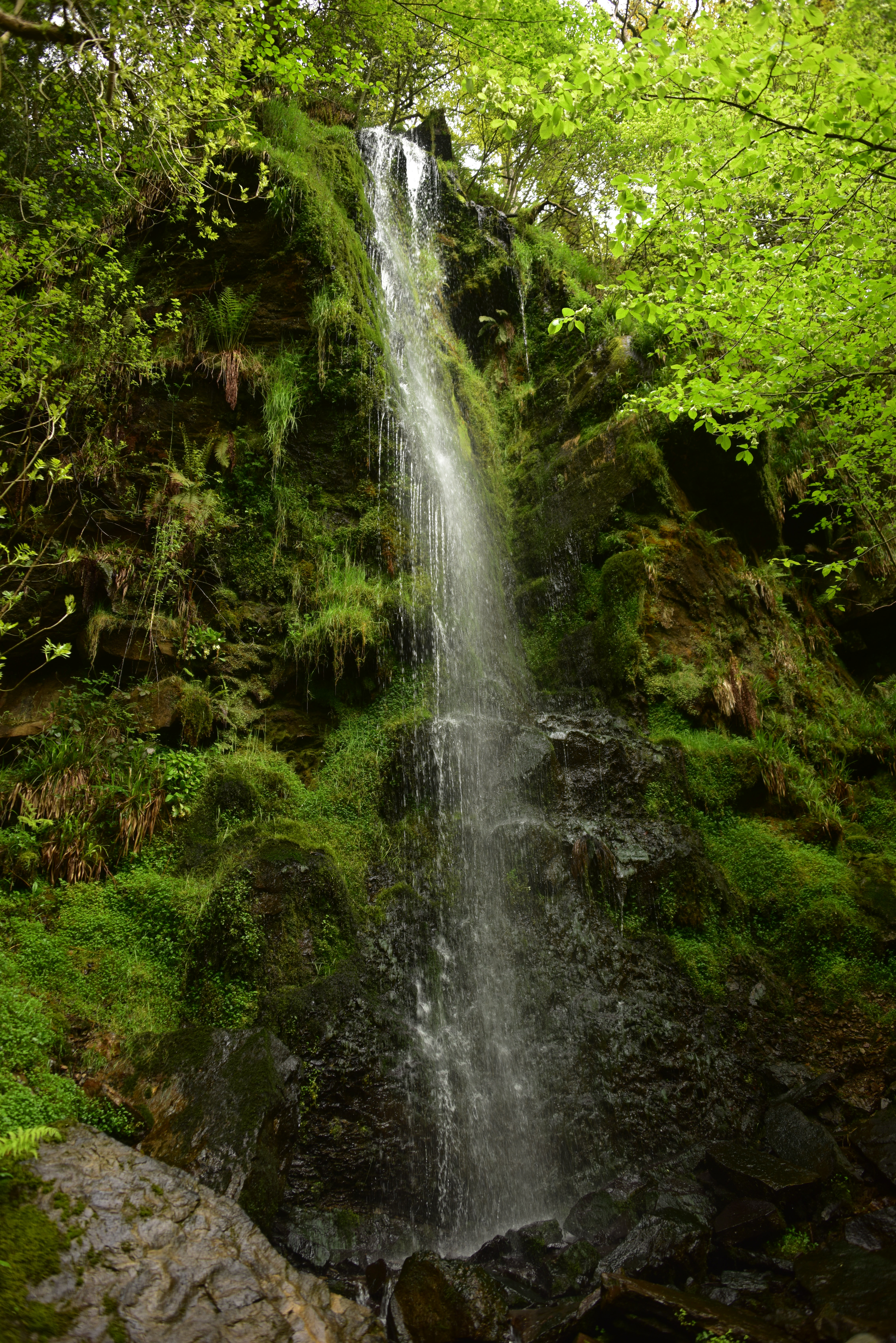
- Interactive map of Mallyan Spout
- Location: North Yorkshire, England
- OS grid: SE825012
- Coordinates: 54.3976°N 0.7323°W
- Total height: 21.3 metres (70 ft)

Mallyan Spout is a waterfall in North Yorkshire, England, the tallest waterfall in the North York Moors. This waterfall is within the protected area called Beck Hole SSSI.

== Geography ==
The waterfall is located in the village of Goathland and has a vertical drop of 70 feet (21 m).

== See also ==
- List of waterfalls
- List of waterfalls in the United Kingdom
