= River Twiss =

River in North Yorkshire, England

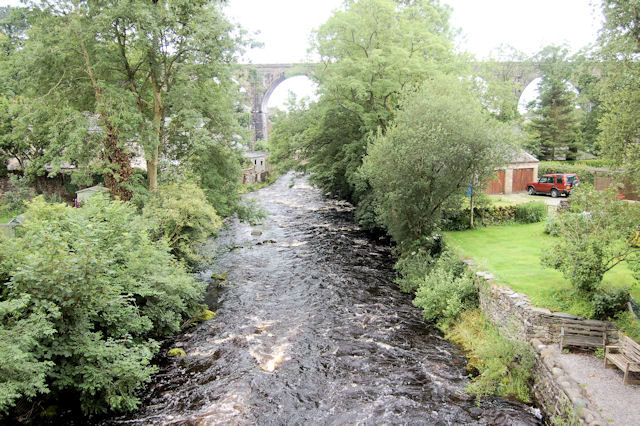
- River Twiss and Ingleton Viaduct

Location
- Country: England

Physical characteristics
- Source
  - location: Kingsdale Beck, Keld Head
  - coordinates: 54°11′3″N 2°28′4″W
  - elevation: 264 metres (866 ft)
- Mouth
  - location: River Doe
  - coordinates: 54°9′11″N 2°28′15″W
  - elevation: 118 metres (387 ft)
- Length: 4.17 km (2.59 mi)

The River Twiss is a river in the county of Yorkshire, England. The source of the river is Kingsdale Beck, which rises at Kingsdale Head at the confluence of Back Gill and Long Gill in the Yorkshire Dales. Beneath Keld Head, the river changes its name to the River Twiss. It has two notable waterfalls, Thornton Force and Pecca Falls, and its course follows part of the Ingleton Waterfalls Walk, then through Swilla Glen to Thornton in Lonsdale and down to Ingleton, where it meets the River Doe to form the River Greta.

The English landscape artist J. M. W. Turner was a frequent visitor to the area, and his sketch of Thornton Force in 1816 is currently part of the Tate collection.

== Course ==
From the caves below Keld Head, water flows and combines with Kingsdale Beck to form the River Twiss. It flows south over Thornton Force and Pecca Falls and through woodland to join the River Doe at Ingleton.

=== Waterfalls ===
The drop of Thornton Force is about 14 metres (46 ft). Pecca Falls has three drops totalling 30 metres (98 ft) that fall into their own deep pools.

== Geology ==
In its upper part, the river flows through a valley carved into horizontal beds of Carboniferous Great Scar limestone. At Thornton Force, it crosses a notable unconformity into the underlying, steeply inclined Ordovician greywackes. The unconformity is clearly visible in the face of the waterfall. The Ordovician strata influence the character of the steep and narrow Swilla Glen and its waterfalls until, just north of Ingleton, the river crosses the Craven Fault and onto Carboniferous Limestone once again.

== Crossings ==
- Ravenray Bridge (foot)
- Pecca Bridge (foot)
- Manor Bridge (foot)
- Unnamed Road, Ingleton

== Gallery ==
River Twiss Images
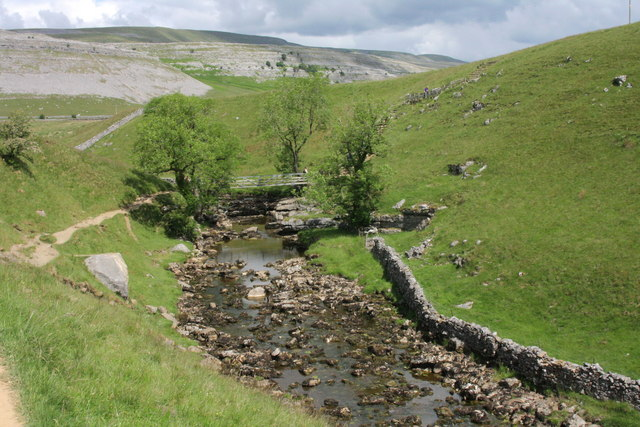
River Twiss, Raven Ray footbridge. To the north the limestone slopes of Keld Head Scars rise to the summit of Gragareth

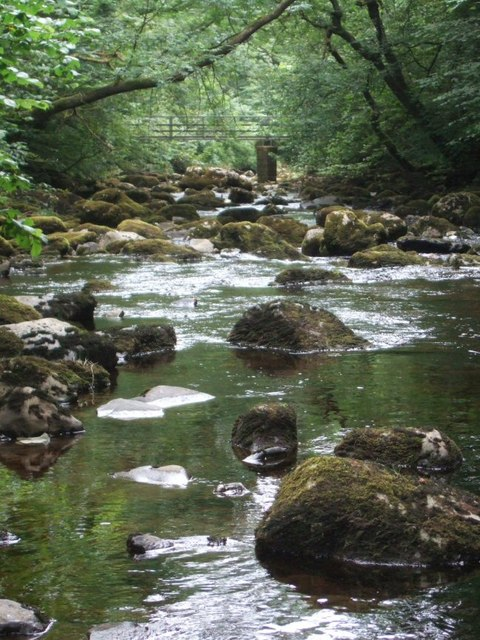
Manor Bridge over River Twiss

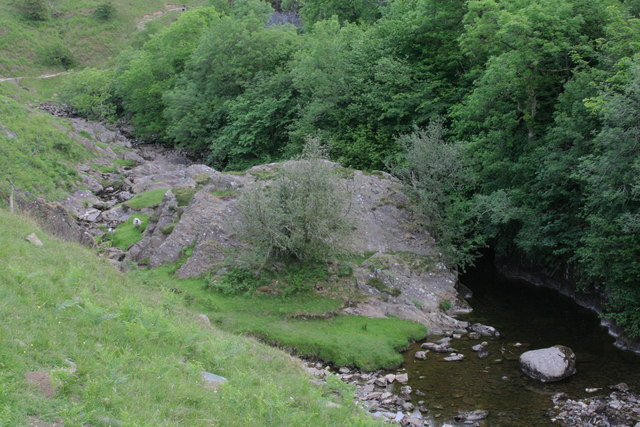
Cuckoo Island in the River Twiss

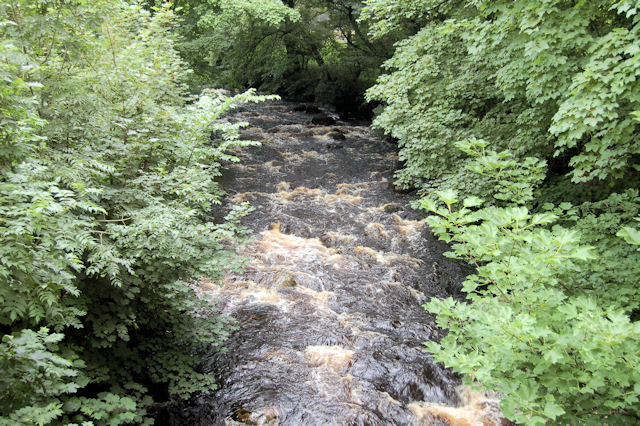
River Twiss seen from the road bridge in Ingleton

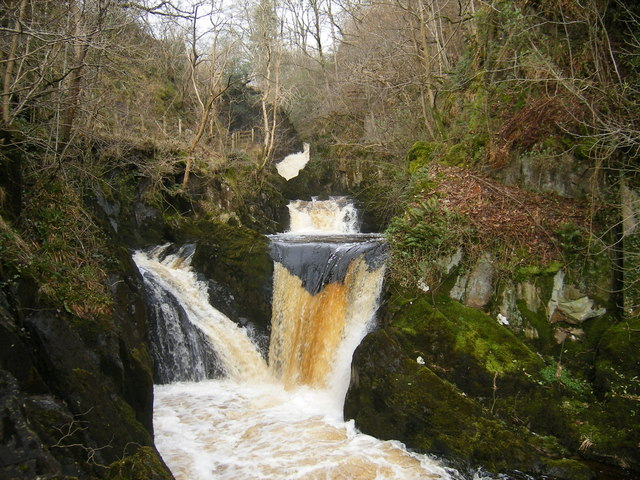
Pecca Falls, River Twiss, near Ingleton

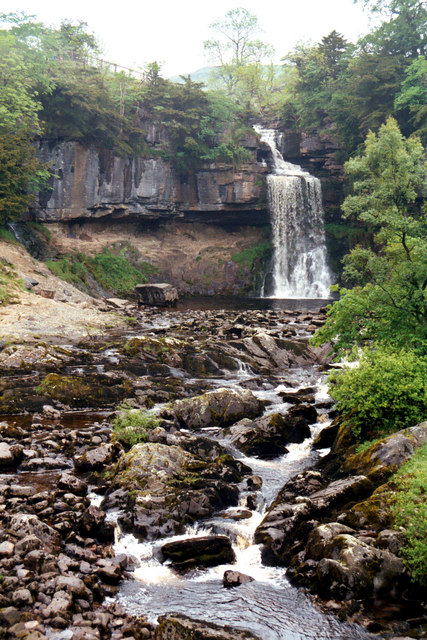
Thornton Force, River Twiss, Ingleton

== Sources ==
Ordnance Survey Open Data https://www.ordnancesurvey.co.uk/business-government/tools-support/open-data-support
