= High Force =

River Tees waterfall in Teesside, England

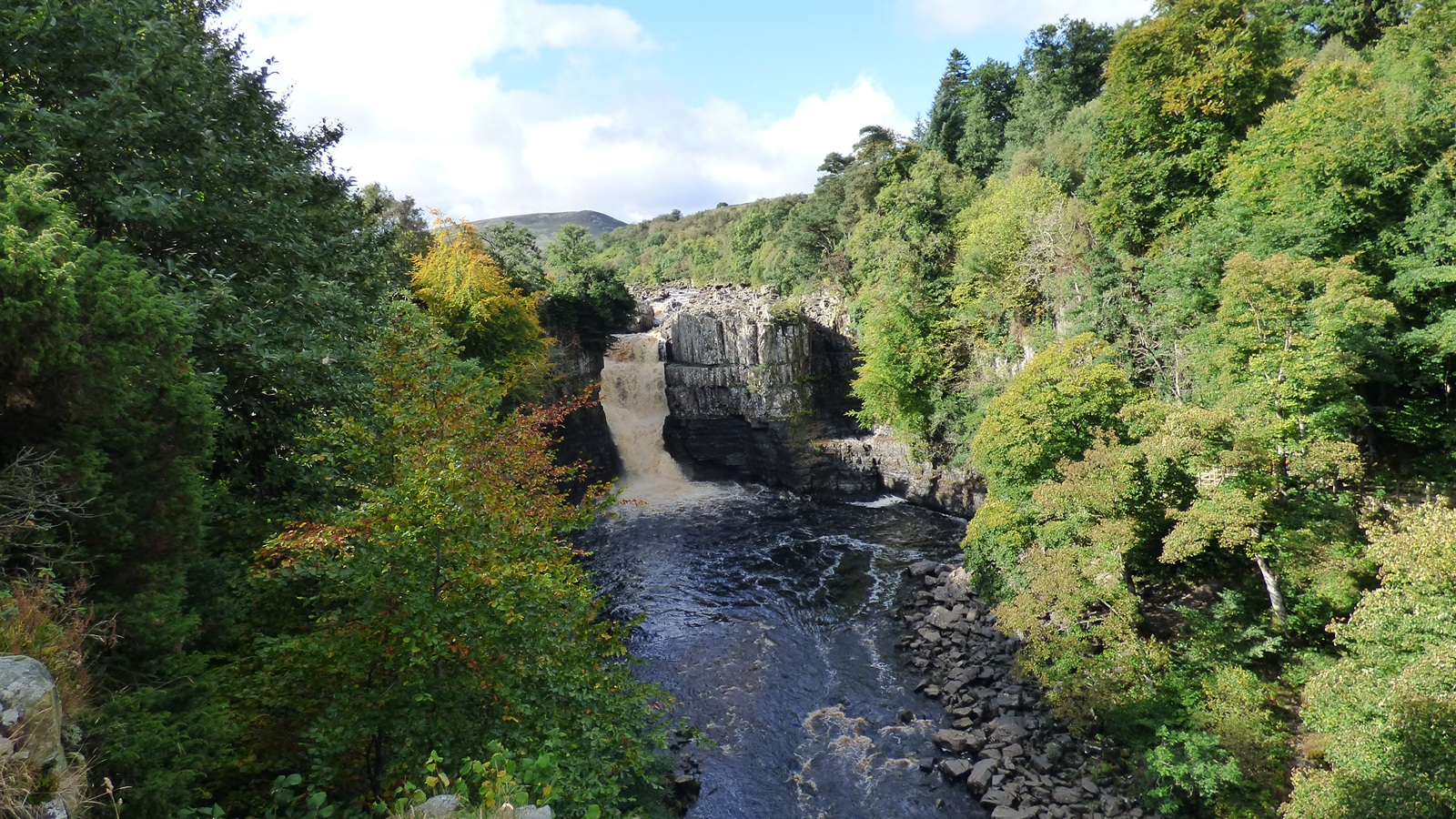
- High Force
- Interactive map of High Force
- Location: Middleton-in-Teesdale, County Durham, England
- Coordinates: 54°39′1″N 2°11′15″W
- Type: Curtain
- Total height: 21 m (69 ft)

High Force is a waterfall on the River Tees, near Middleton-in-Teesdale, Teesdale, England. The waterfall is within the North Pennines Area of Outstanding Natural Beauty (AONB) and the European Geopark. The whole of the River Tees plunges 70 feet (21 m) over a precipice (an almost vertical cliff edge) in two stages. After heavy rainfall the river will also flow over the usually dry right-hand side channel, creating two falls. Very occasionally the river level will be high enough to flow over the central section of rock; the last recorded time this happened was in December 2015 after Storm Desmond. In harsh winters the falls have been known to freeze, creating cathedral-like ice formations.

Access to the northern bank is via a private footpath on the Raby estate for which a fee is charged. The southern bank can be reached free of charge via the Pennine Way public footpath which crosses the Moor House-Upper Teesdale National Nature Reserve.

== Geology ==
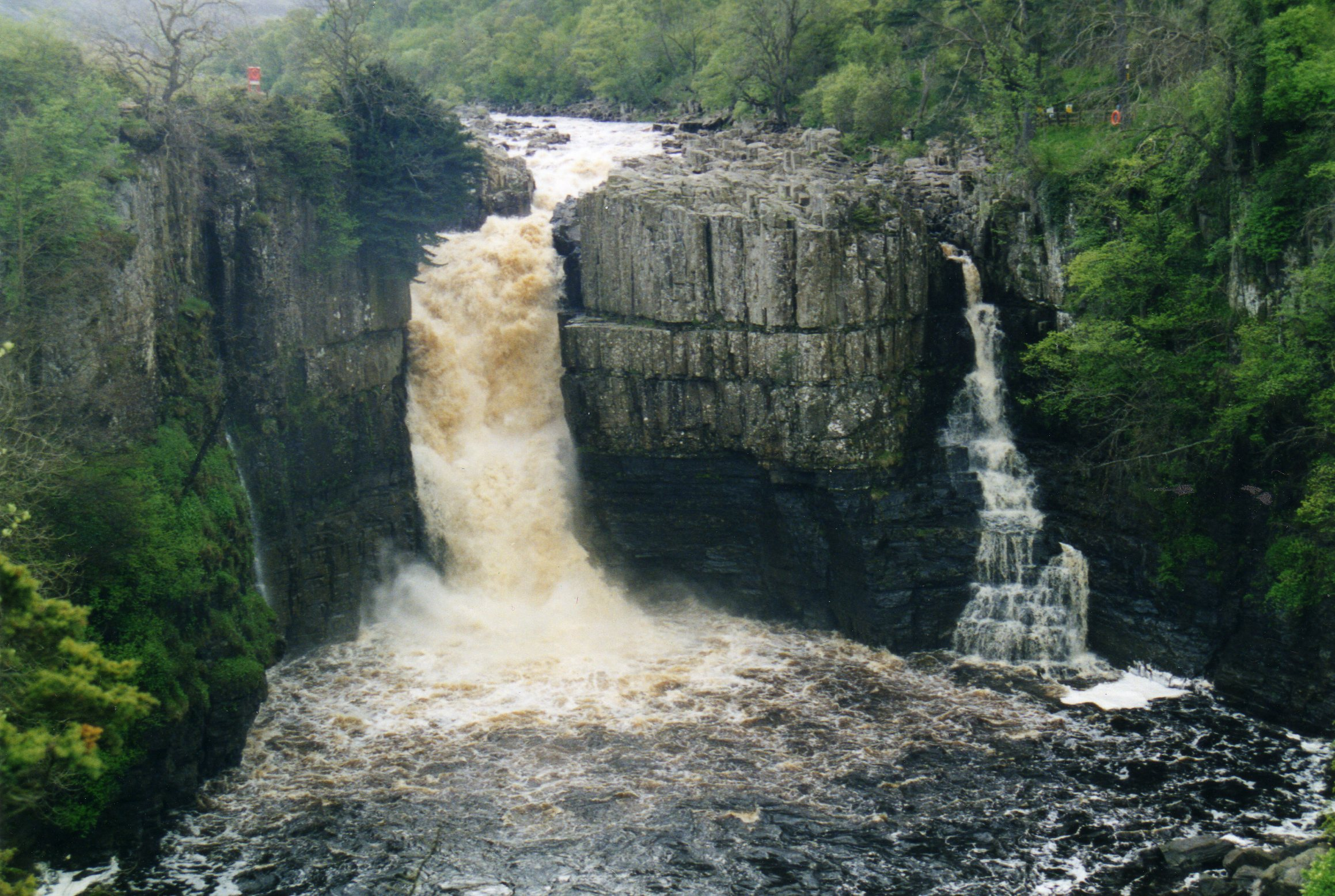
A view including the now rarely seen second fall on the right

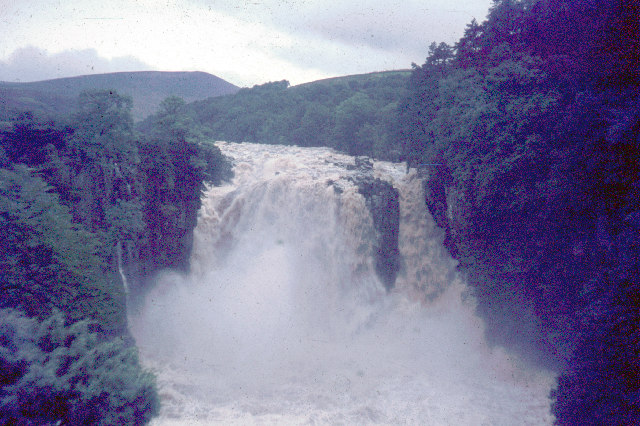
Storm conditions in 1968

High Force was formed where the River Tees crosses the Whin Sill – a hard layer of igneous rock (also seen at Hadrian's Wall and other locations). The waterfall itself consists of three different types of rock. The upper band is made up of whinstone, or dolerite, a hard igneous rock which the waterfall takes a lot of time to erode. The lower section is made up of Carboniferous Limestone, a softer rock which is more easily worn away by the waterfall. Between these two layers is a thinner layer of Carboniferous sandstone, which was baked hard when the Whin Sill was molten 295 million years ago. The wearing away of rock means that the waterfall is slowly moving upstream, leaving a narrow, deep gorge in front of it. The length of the gorge is currently about 700 metres (2,300 ft). The bed load (rocks that the river is carrying) is mainly composed of large boulders, which are rolled along the river bed. Upstream of the waterfall, the river is narrow; downstream, it widens and meanders.

== Relative height ==
Despite popular belief that it is the highest waterfall in England, at 71 feet (22 m), others have a longer fall: Cautley Spout, in Cumbria's Howgill Fells, is almost 590 feet (180 m) high, and Hardraw Force, in North Yorkshire, has an unbroken drop of 98 feet (30 m). Underground, on the flanks of Ingleborough, Fell Beck falls an unbroken 315 feet (96 m) down the Jib Tunnel of Gaping Gill Hole. However, High Force does have the largest volume of water falling over an unbroken drop when in full spate, thereby earning its Nordic name "High Fosse".

== In popular culture ==
Stock footage of the waterfalls was featured in the 1969 film Mackenna's Gold. Although the story of the film is supposed to occur in the American Southwest, stock footage of High Force was used. High Force also appeared in Emmerdale in 2021.

== Notable visitors ==
The painter J. M. W. Turner arrived at High Force at 10:00 a.m. on 3 August 1816 to sketch the scene. He then travelled upstream to Cauldron Snout and eventually made his way to Dufton, across the fells, in inclement weather.

Arthur Young came with his wife on horseback from Durham in 1771 and made the following comment:

The whole river (no trifling one) divided by one rock into two vast torrents pours down a perpendicular precipice of near fourscore feet: The deluging force of the water throws up such a foam and misty rain, that the sun never shines without a large and brilliant rainbow appearing... After preaching at Cuthberton and in Teesdale, I went a little out of my way, to see one of the wonders of nature. The river Tees rushes down between two rocks, and falls sixty feet perpendicular into a basin of water sixty feet deep ...

== See also ==
- List of waterfalls
- List of waterfalls in the United Kingdom
