= Falling Foss =

Waterfall in North Yorkshire, England

Coordinates: 54°25′08.4″N 0°37′57.9″W

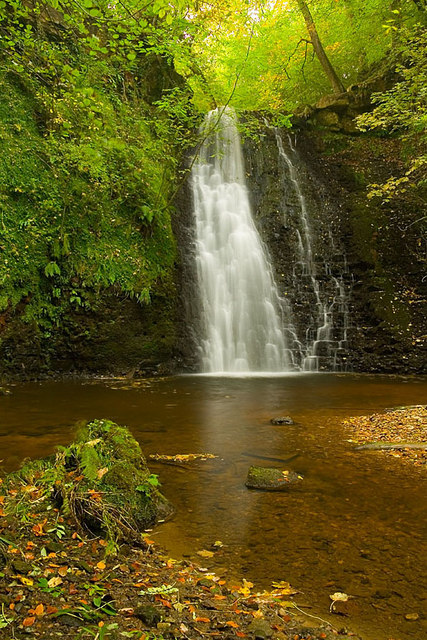
Falling Foss waterfall

Falling Foss is a waterfall in the north-east section of the North York Moors National Park and a popular spot for walking. It is about 5 miles (8 km) south of Whitby, and a similar distance inland from Robin Hood's Bay. It is on the Little Beck, and accessible by walking from the May Beck. It is 67 feet (20 m) high, and is the highest waterfall in the North York Moors. There is a tea garden adjacent to the waterfall.

== See also ==
- List of waterfalls
- List of waterfalls in the United Kingdom
