= Moss Force =

Waterfall within the Lake District National Park in England

Coordinates: 54.5458°N 3.2488°W

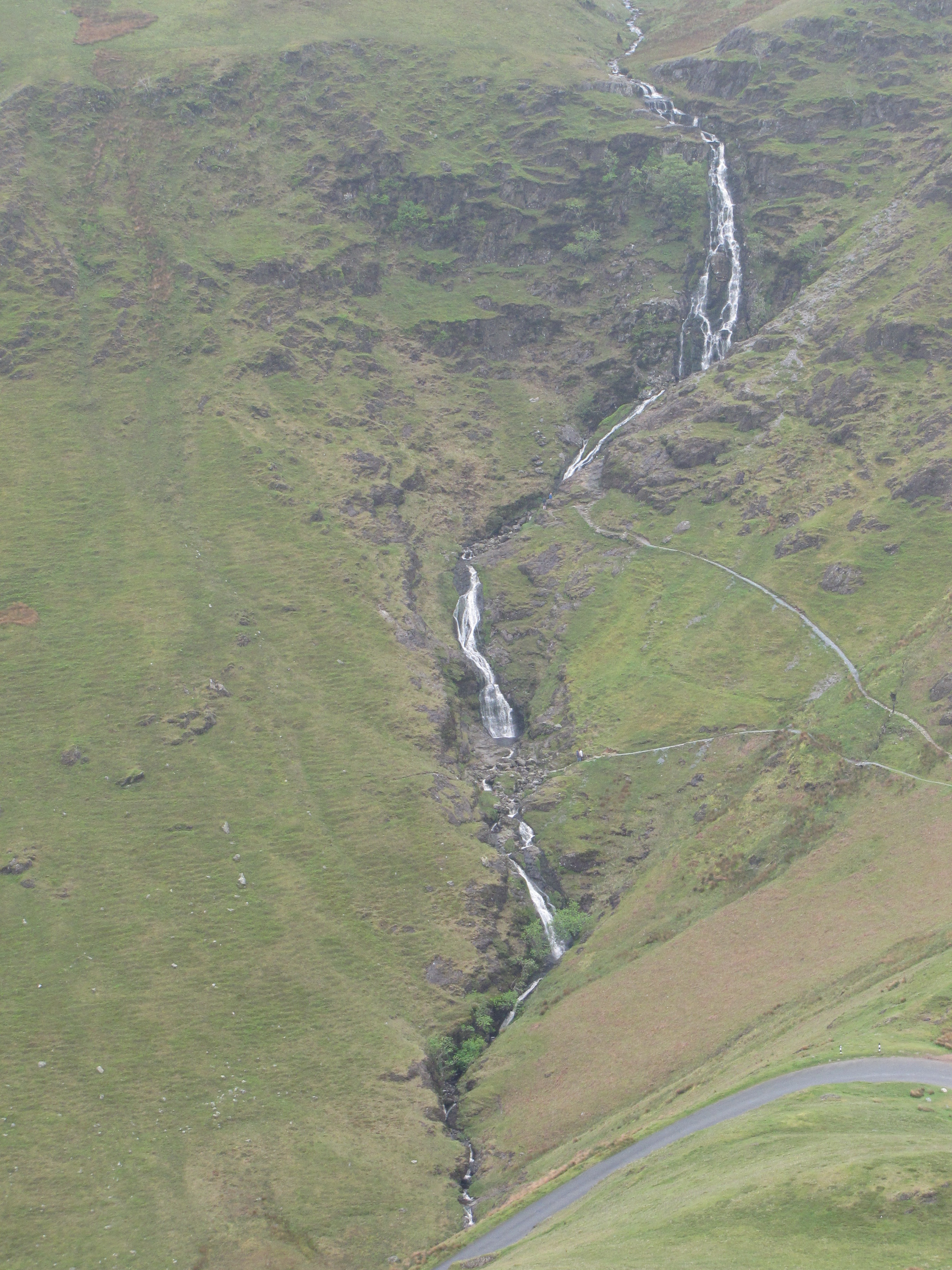
Moss Force seen from the slopes of Knott Rigg, one km to the north

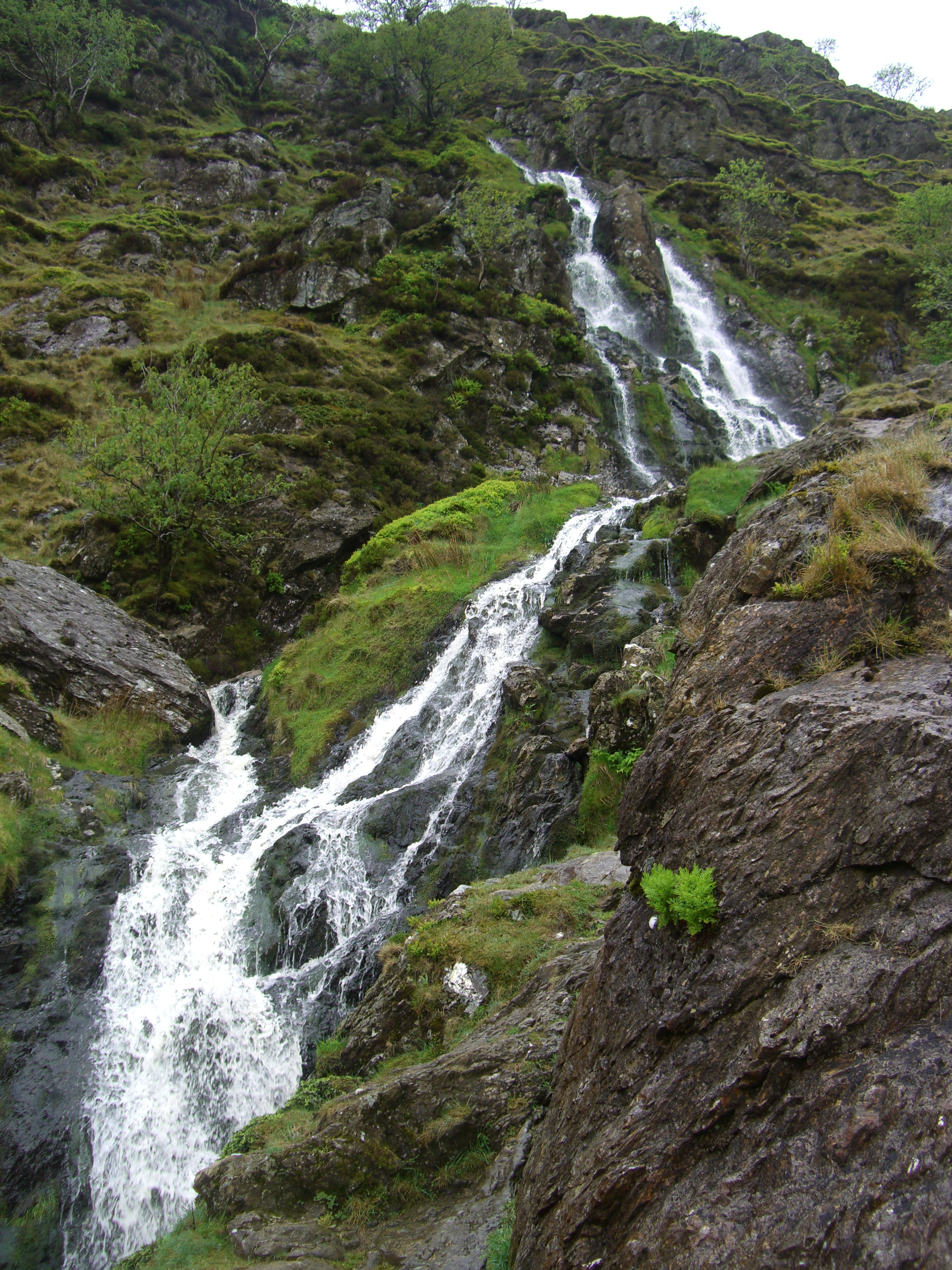
The middle section of Moss Force

Moss Force is a waterfall situated within the Lake District National Park in the English county of Cumbria. It is located 10 km SW of the town of Keswick at Newlands Hause, the pass between the Newlands Valley and the Buttermere Valley. It is part of Alfred Wainwright's famous "Wainwright Memorial Walk," and its beauty was celebrated by Samuel Taylor Coleridge.

== Description ==
Moss Force is approximately 100 metres (328 ft) high, standing on Moss Beck which flows off the fell of Robinson. The Beck rises at a height of 540 metres, flowing across a boggy area known as Buttermere Moss before plunging down from a height of 420 metres in three distinct sections to form Moss Force. The top section, which is also the highest cascade, is split by an outcrop of rock and falls into a small pool surrounded by a few Rowan trees, then continues downwards through two smaller cascades. The middle cascade falls into a larger pool which has scattered Juniper around it. The bottom cascade is smallest of the three, after which the Beck enters a small wooded gorge containing further smaller falls. The Beck then levels out in the bottom of the Newlands Valley as it is joined by High Hole Beck and becomes Keskadale Beck.

Moss Force is a popular stop with visitors and tourists. The falls are visited by many motorists and passengers from some of the Lake District tour buses which stop at Newlands Hause. There are two paths from the Hause to the foot of both the upper and middle cascades, although a little scrambling over rock is required to reach the foot of the upper falls. Moss Force is a grade III Winter Ice Climb, a 110-metre climb in total, and is divided into four sections, of 15, 25, 50 and 20 metres. The upper falls are the longest and the most difficult of the sections and the protruding outcrop can be passed on either side. The final 20-metre section is a less steep part of the Force at its very highest point, which leads on to Buttermere Moss.

The falls are along the way of the "Wainwright Memorial Walk," a 102-mile (164-kilometre) walk devised by famed British fellwalker and writer Alfred Wainwright in his Pictorial Guide to the Lakeland Fells, and are included in numerous British walking tours and guides.

== In literature ==
The poet Samuel Taylor Coleridge visited Moss Force in 1802; he waited until the Force was in spate after heavy rain and explored the falls in September of that year. Coleridge recorded the visit in a private letter to Sara Hutchinson, saying of the upper cascade:

It is so near a perpendicular that it would have appeared to fall--but it is indeed so fearfully savage, & black, & jagged, that it tears the flood to pieces--and one great black Outjutment divides the water, & overbrows & keeps uncovered a long slip of jagged black Rock beneath, which gives a marked character to the whole force. What a sight it is to look down on such a Cataract!--the wheels, that circumvolve in it--the leaping up & plunging forward of that infinity of Pearls & Glass Bulbs--the continual change of the Matter, the perpetual Sameness of the Form-it is an awful Image & Shadow of God & the World.

Thomas West, in his Guide to the Lakes (1778), described the Force as "a mountain of purple coloured rock presenting a thousand chasms".

== See also ==
- List of waterfalls
- List of waterfalls in the United Kingdom
