= Cautley Spout =

Waterfall in Cumbria, England

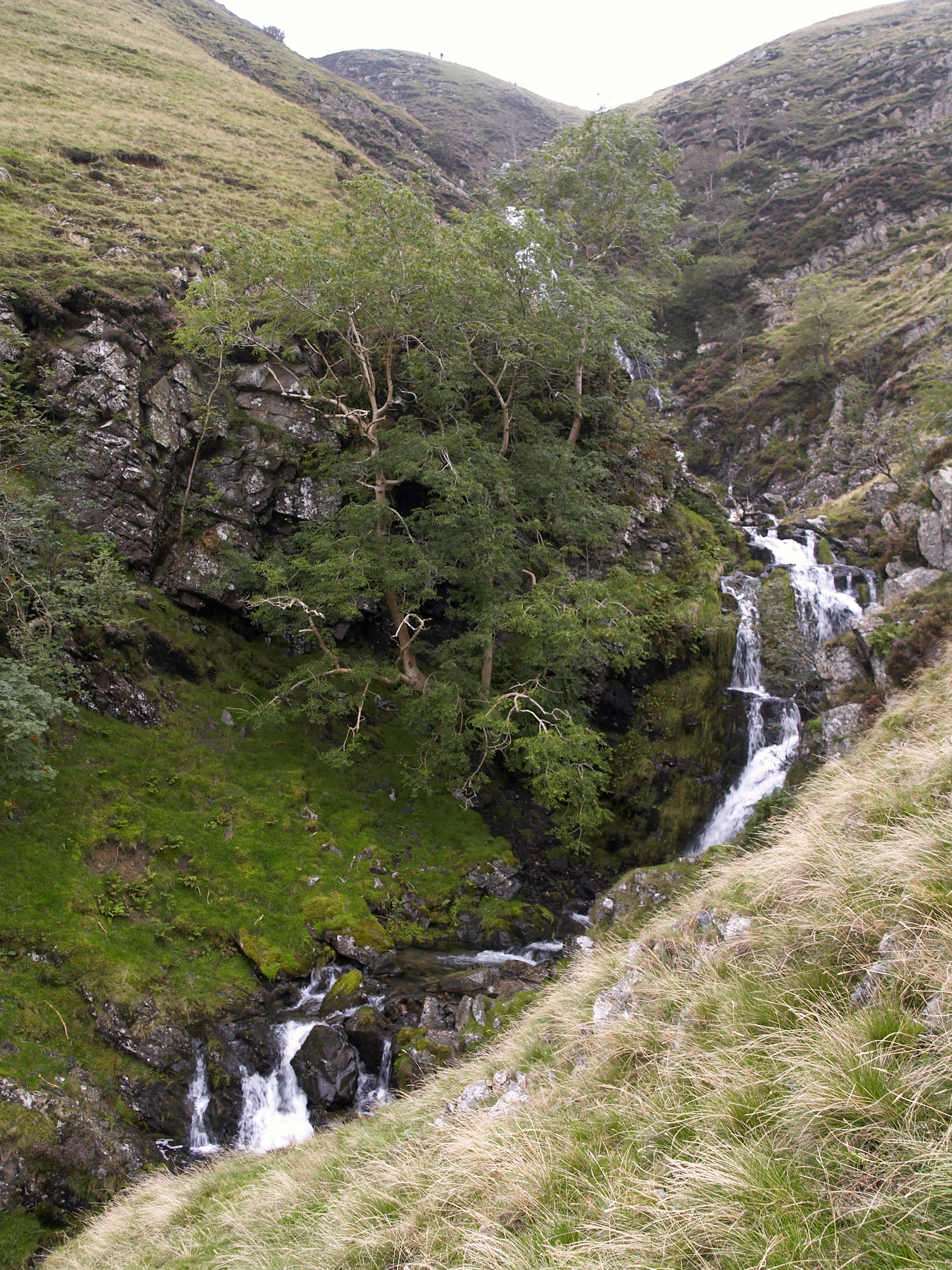
- Interactive map of Cautley Spout
- Location: Cumbria, England
- Coordinates: 54°22′21″N 2°29′30″W
- Total height: 175 m (574 ft)
- Watercourse: Tributary of the River Rawthey

Cautley Spout is England's highest (cascade) waterfall above ground. (Gaping Gill on Ingleborough falls a greater unbroken distance into a pothole, and Hardraw Force has a greater unbroken fall above ground). The broken cascade of falls tumbles a total of 650 feet (198 m) down a cliff face at the head of a wild and bleak glacial valley that comes down from a high plateau called The Calf. It is located in the Howgill Fells, traditionally in the West Riding of Yorkshire but now in the ceremonial county of Cumbria on the western edge of the Yorkshire Dales National Park. The waterfall is just north of Sedbergh. The National Trust owns a historic temperance inn, the Cross Keys, which is located close by.

This fall is one of the few cascade falls in England; most are either tiered or plunge falls.

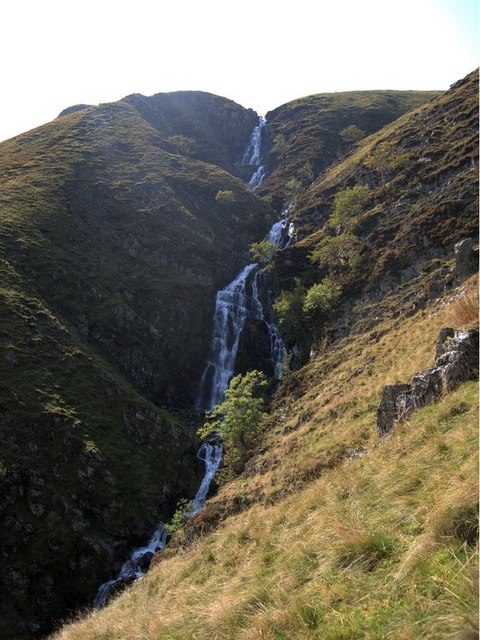
The upper section of Cautley Spout

- Waterfall#Types
- List of waterfalls
- List of waterfalls in the United Kingdom
