= Devil's Appendix =

- Nant Clogwyn y Geifr (Welsh)
- Interactive map of Devil's Appendix
- Location: Snowdonia, Wales
- Coordinates: 53.109835°N 4.035335°W
- Type: Plunge
- Total height: 93 m (305 ft)
- Watercourse: Afon Ogwen tributary

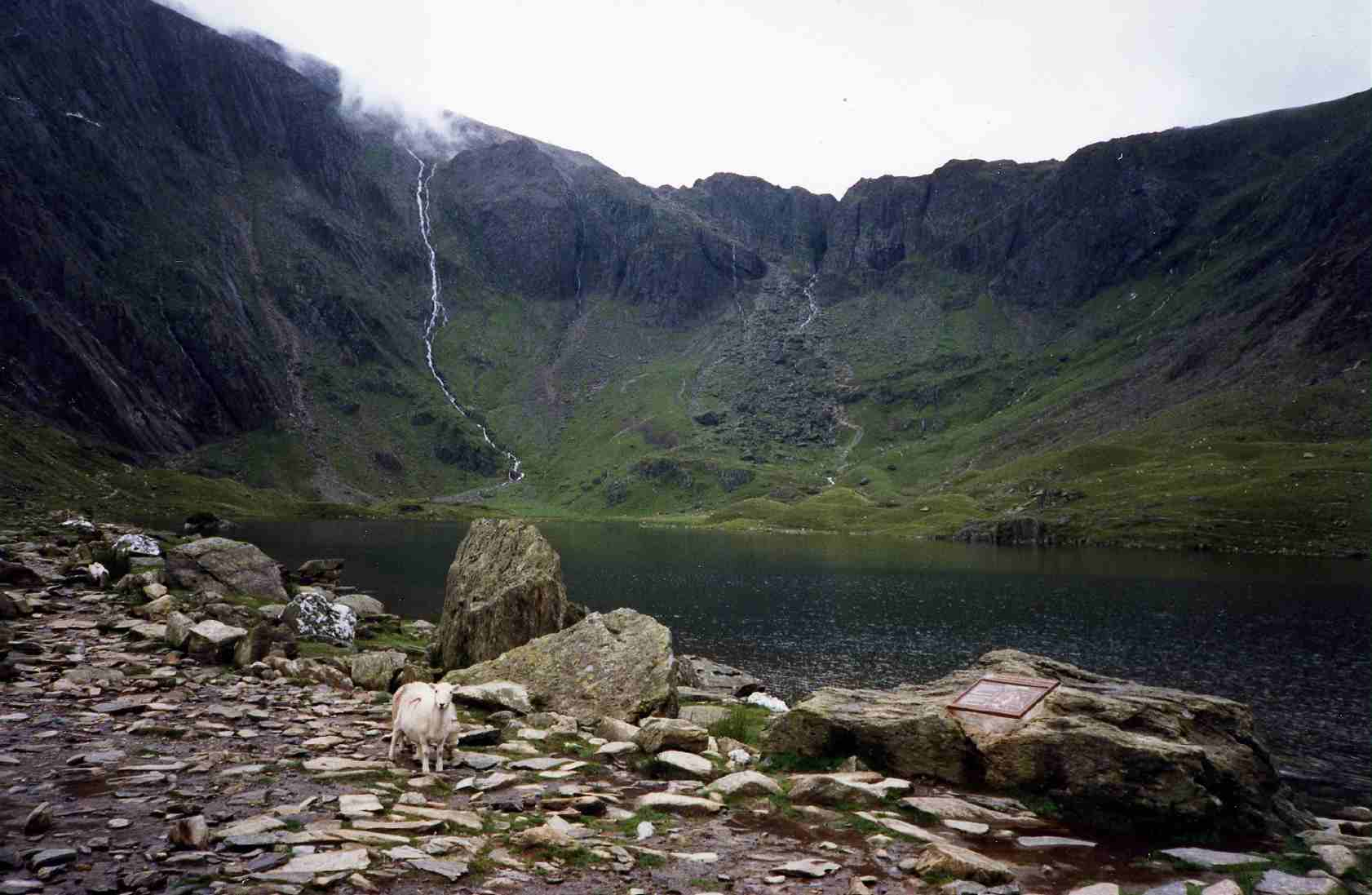
The Devil's Appendix can be seen as a dark area to the right of the gorge on the right (Twll Du)

The Devil's Appendix (Welsh: Nant Clogwyn y Geifr) is the tallest single-drop waterfall in Wales and one of the tallest in the United Kingdom. It is a plunge style waterfall located on the Clogwyn y Geifr cliffs beside Twll Du in Cwm Idwal, Snowdonia, Wales.

It is formed where a small stream falls for approximately 305 feet (93 metres) to reach the slopes above Llyn Idwal. Depending on flow and the ambient temperature, it can be either an ice climbing route, a single drop waterfall, or a broken waterfall.

== See also ==
- List of waterfalls
- List of waterfalls in Wales
