= River Doe =

River in North Yorkshire, England

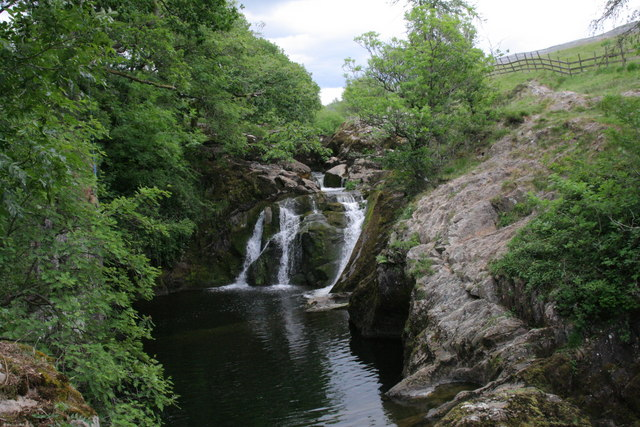
- River Doe near Ingleton, flowing over Beezley Falls

Location
- Country: England

Physical characteristics
- Source
  - location: God's Bridge nr Chapel-Le-Dale
  - coordinates: 54°10′58″N 2°24′40″W
  - elevation: 234 metres (768 ft)
- Mouth
  - location: Confluence with River Twiss at Ingleton
  - coordinates: 54°9′12″N 2°28′15″W
  - elevation: 118 metres (387 ft)
- Length: 5.92 km (3.68 mi)

The River Doe is a river in North Yorkshire, England. The river's source is near God's Bridge close to the settlement of Chapel-le-Dale and flows through Twisleton in a south-westerly direction to Ingleton, where it meets the River Twiss to form the River Greta. The river forms part of the River Lune system that flows into the Irish Sea.

== Course ==
The source of the river is found at a place named God's Bridge where Chapel Beck disappears underground and the Doe begins. The river flows southwest, fed by several small unnamed springs on the valley sides. The first named tributary is Light Water Spring which feeds northwest into the river near a disused quarry. Near Twisleton Dale House, the river can be crossed by some stepping stones at a fording point as well as some 700 yards (640 m) later near the disused granite quarry. Further downstream near Twisleton Hall, there is another set of stepping stones at a fording point just above Beezley Falls. After flowing under a footbridge, there are another set of falls, Snow Falls, just below the quarry which is operated by Hanson. The river continues past several disused quarries and a footbridge until it reaches the town of Ingleton where it forms a confluence with the River Twiss.

== Falls ==
Beezley Falls are reached approximately 2.1 miles (3.4 km) from the source at God's Bridge. These falls consist of a series of cascades, including the triple spout, running through Baxengyhll Gorge. Rival Falls has a plunge pool known as the Black Hole. The steepest drops are between 9 feet (2.7 m) and 12 feet (3.7 m) approximately. Snow Falls are situated in the lower gorge about 0.5 miles (0.8 km) downstream and has similar drops.

== Geology ==
The main rock of the river valley is turbidite sandstone with some siltstone which are prevalent in the waterfalls and plunge pools. These lay on a bed of Precambrian sedimentary rock which show evidence of its oceanic origins in the ripple and folding marks on exposed surfaces.

== Habitat ==
The river is home to Brown trout. From Beezley falls to Snow falls, the sides of the gorge are lined with a variety of trees and shrubs.

== Gallery ==
Views of the River Doe
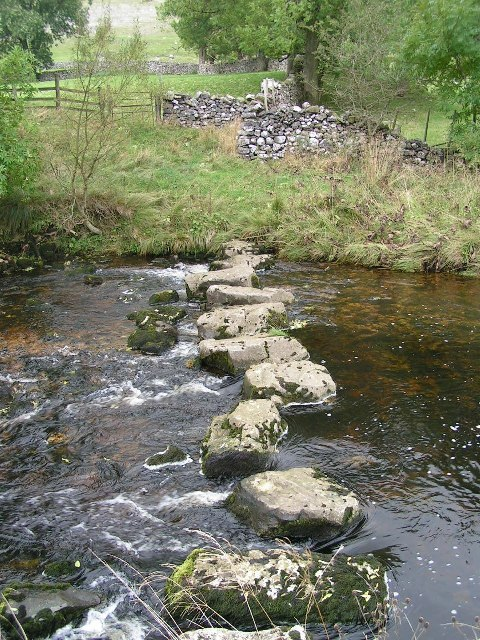
Stepping stones, River Doe between Dale House and Twistleton Dale House

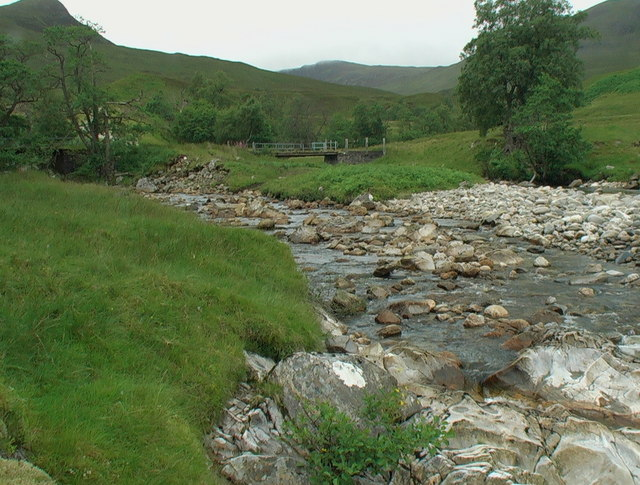
Stream confluence at head of River Doe.

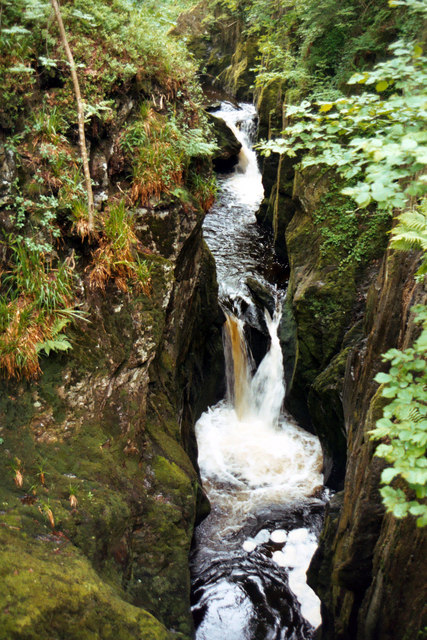
Baxengill Gorge, River Doe, near Ingleton

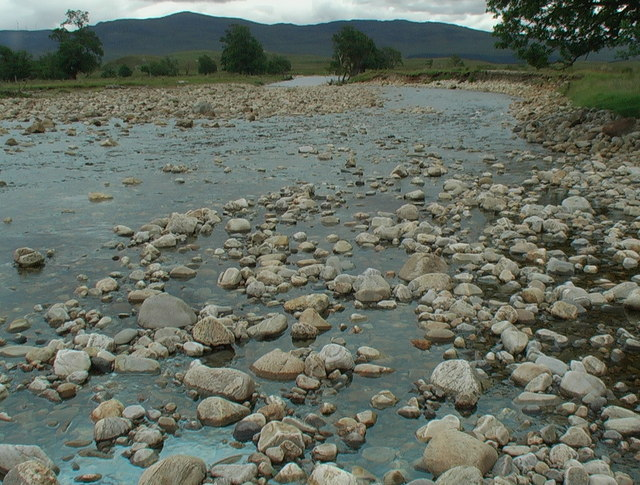
Wide flood-bed of River Doe
