= Cauldron Snout =

Cascade on River Tees

Coordinates: 54.65395°N 2.28980°W

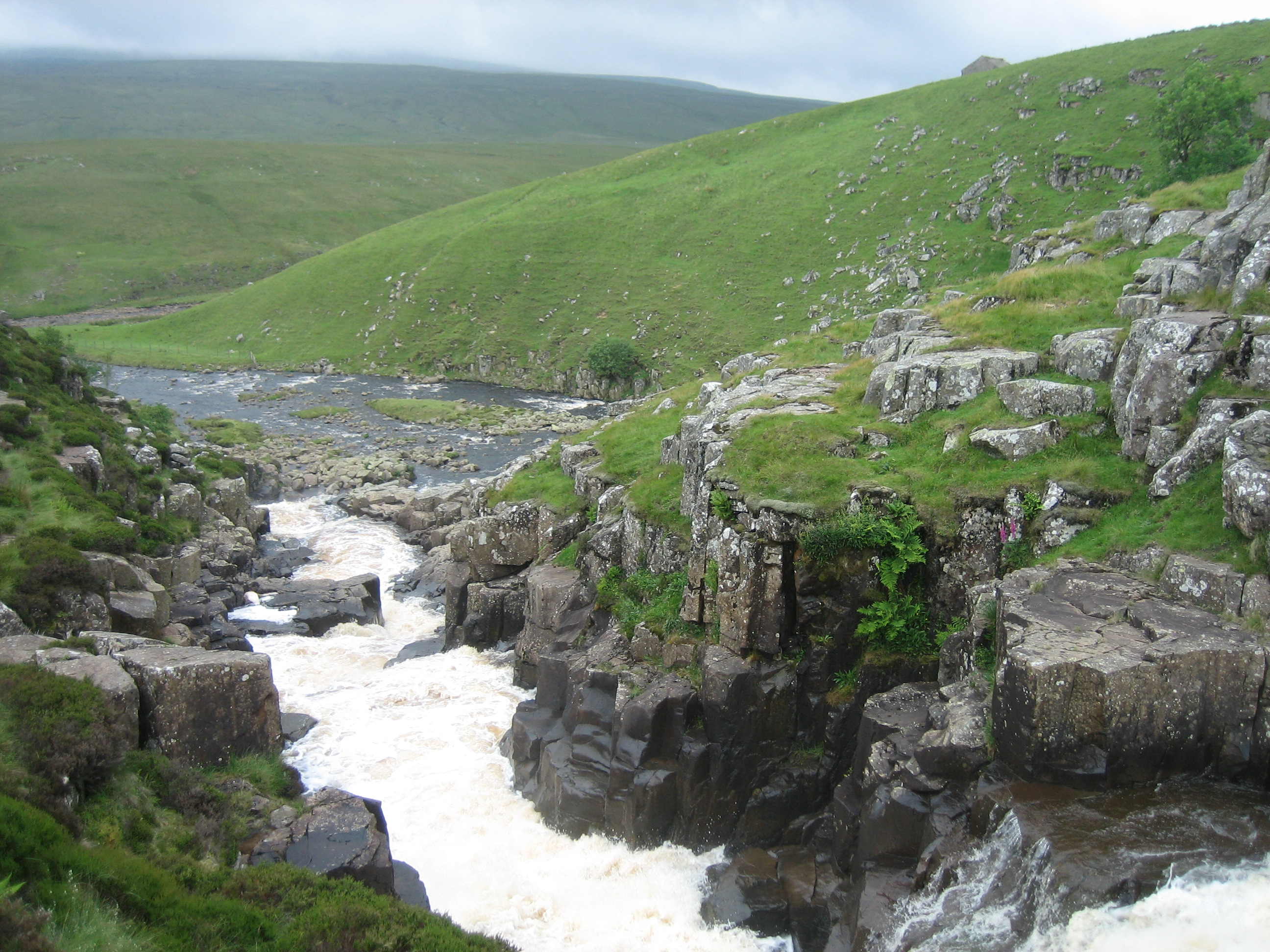
- Looking downstream
- Interactive map of Cauldron Snout
- Location: County Durham/Cumbria (Westmorland), England
- Total height: 60 m (200 ft)

Cauldron Snout is a cascade on the upper reaches of the River Tees in Northern England, immediately below the dam of the Cow Green Reservoir. It is well upstream of the High Force waterfall, and is on the boundary between County Durham and Cumbria (historically Westmorland), England. The waterfall lies within the North Pennines Area of Outstanding Natural Beauty (AONB) and European Geopark.

It is more a long cataract than a waterfall, and at 200 yards (180 m) long, reckoned to be the longest waterfall in England.

It is impressive by the scale of the British landscape, and attracts a lot of visitors, despite the 3-kilometre (1.9 mi) walk from the nearest car park at Cow Green Reservoir. No fee is payable as of 2020. The Pennine Way takes in Cauldron Snout.

The falls are caused by the upper Tees passing over dolerite steps of the Whin Sill.

== In art and literature ==
An engraving of a painting of the cataract by Thomas Allom was published in Fisher's Drawing Room Scrap Book, 1835 with a poetical illustration thereon, Caldron Snout.—Westmorland, or 'Long years have past since last I stood', by Letitia Elizabeth Landon,

In W H Auden’s long poem ’Letter to Elizabeth Meyer’ published in 1941 he looks back to the impact this part of England had on him during family holidays in Weardale:

” Always my boyhood wish returns

To those peat-stained deserted burns

That feed the Wear and Tyne and Tees,

And, turning states to strata, sees

How basalt long oppressed broke out

In wild revolt at Cauldron Snout”

== See also ==
- List of waterfalls
- List of waterfalls in the United Kingdom
