= Hardraw Force =

Waterfall in North Yorkshire, England

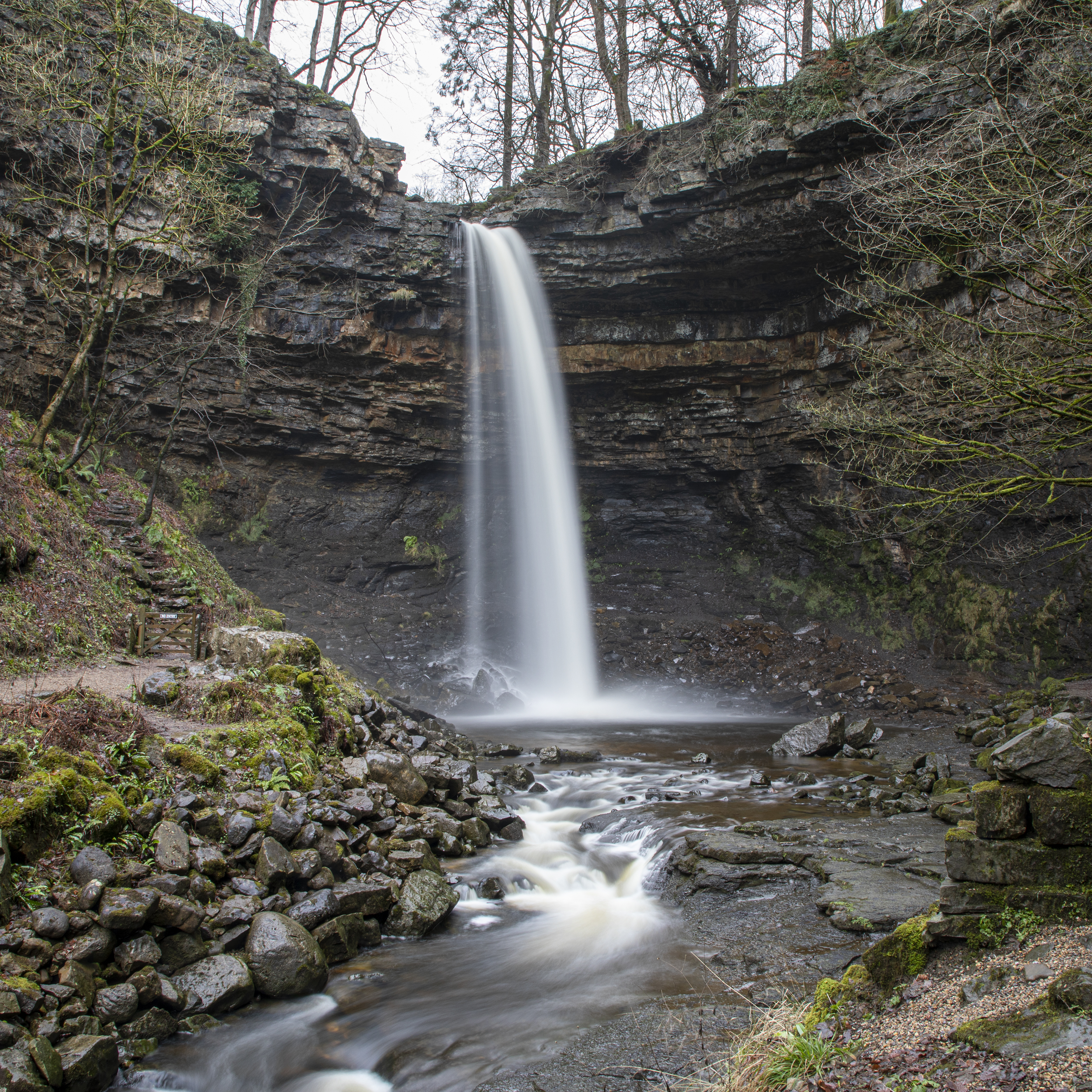
- Hardraw Force
- Interactive map of Hardraw Force
- Location: Hardraw, Yorkshire Dales, England
- Coordinates: 54.32099°N 2.20184°W
- Type: Plunge
- Total height: 100 feet (30 m)

Hardraw Force (OS grid ref: SD869917) is a waterfall on Hardraw Beck in Hardraw Scar, a wooded ravine just outside the hamlet of Hardraw, 0.9 miles (1.5 km) north of the town of Hawes, Wensleydale, in the Yorkshire Dales. The Pennine Way long distance footpath passes close by.

Comprising a single drop of 100 feet (30 m) from a rocky overhang, Hardraw Force is claimed to be England's highest unbroken waterfall (Note: On 6 December 2015 Malham Cove regained its waterfall after a gap of what is possibly centuries. After Storm Desmond, water was seen falling off the 230-foot (70 m) cliff into the stream below, which made it, temporarily, the largest unbroken waterfall in England.) – at least discounting underground falls. The underground waterfall inside nearby Gaping Gill on the western flank of Ingleborough has an unbroken fall of more than 300 feet (91 m).

Geologically the bed of the river and plunge pool is shale; on top of that is sandstone and the top layer is carboniferous limestone.

It is on private land but public access to the falls is available through a turnstile behind the Green Dragon Inn. The current cost is £4 per adult, £2.50 per child. Access behind the falls is now prohibited.

== Hardraw Scar ==
Hardraw Scar (54.316°N 2.205°W) is a limestone gorge behind the Green Dragon inn at Hardraw near Hawes in the Yorkshire Dales. It is a natural amphitheatre and in September is the site of an annual brass-band contest. The contest attracts bands from all over the North of England and is a popular event amongst players and audiences alike.

The gorge is alongside the Pennine Way. Access to the gorge is via the nearby public house.

In 1899 a great flood came racing over the waterfall and into Hardraw itself, ruining buildings and uprooting coffins from the graveyard. The lip of the waterfall was demolished by the force of the water and the landowner at the time (Lord Wharncliffe) got his estate manager to repair the lip and it is now held together at the top by metal stakes.

== Hardraw Force in popular culture ==
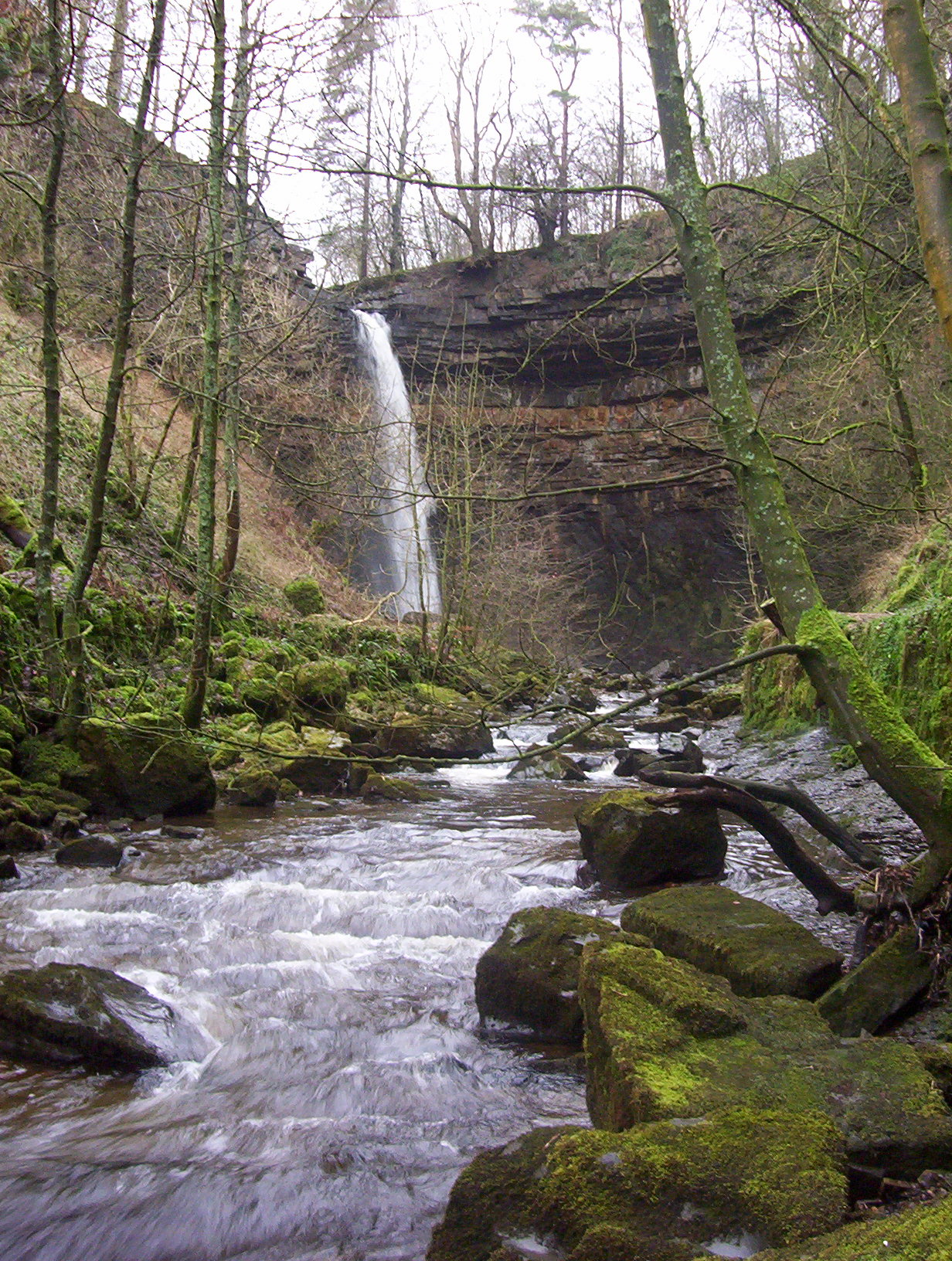
Hardraw Force, 2004

The renowned waterfall has attracted a number of notable visitors over the years. Both J. M. W. Turner and William Wordsworth visited Hardraw Force, with each staying at the nearby Green Dragon Inn.

Hardraw Force featured prominently in the 1991 film Robin Hood: Prince of Thieves, serving as the backdrop for the scene in which Maid Marian discovers Robin Hood bathing beneath a waterfall.

The waterfall is also the site of the annual Hardraw Scar Brass Band Contest, held on the second Sunday in September. The event began in the 1880s and, after a hiatus beginning in 1927, was revived in the 1970s.

More recently, Hardraw Force has hosted folk-music events. The Hardraw Summer Gathering, a three-day festival of folk music and real ale, was held annually from 2010 to 2014. In June 2013, a separate event, the Hardraw Folk Gathering, took place at the Green Dragon Inn and surrounding area, featuring multiple live folk sessions. Traditional music sessions were reported to have returned to the Green Dragon in 2023.

== See also ==
- List of waterfalls
- List of waterfalls in the United Kingdom
