= Yorkshire Dales National Park =

National park in England

- IUCN category V (protected landscape/seascape)
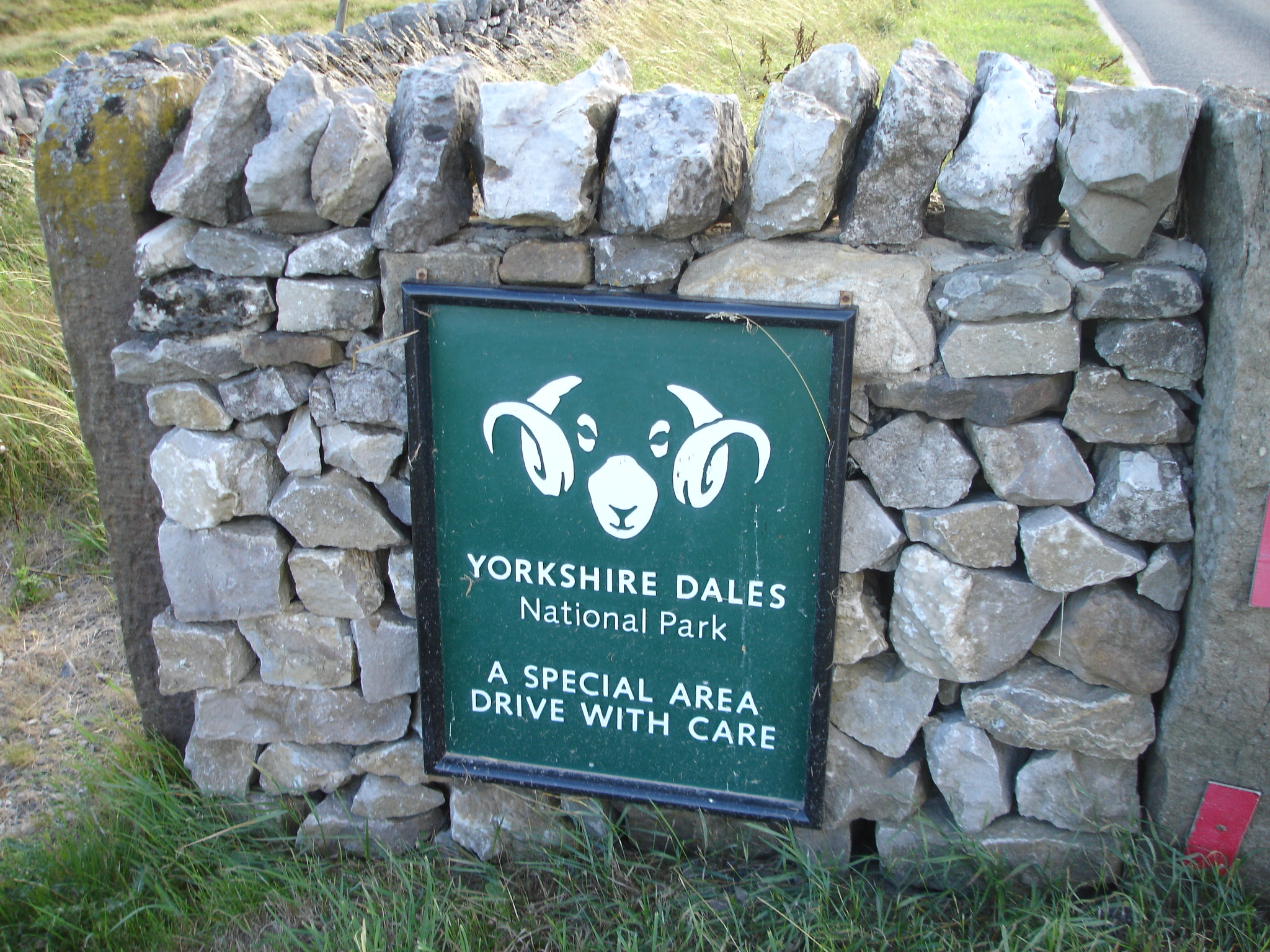
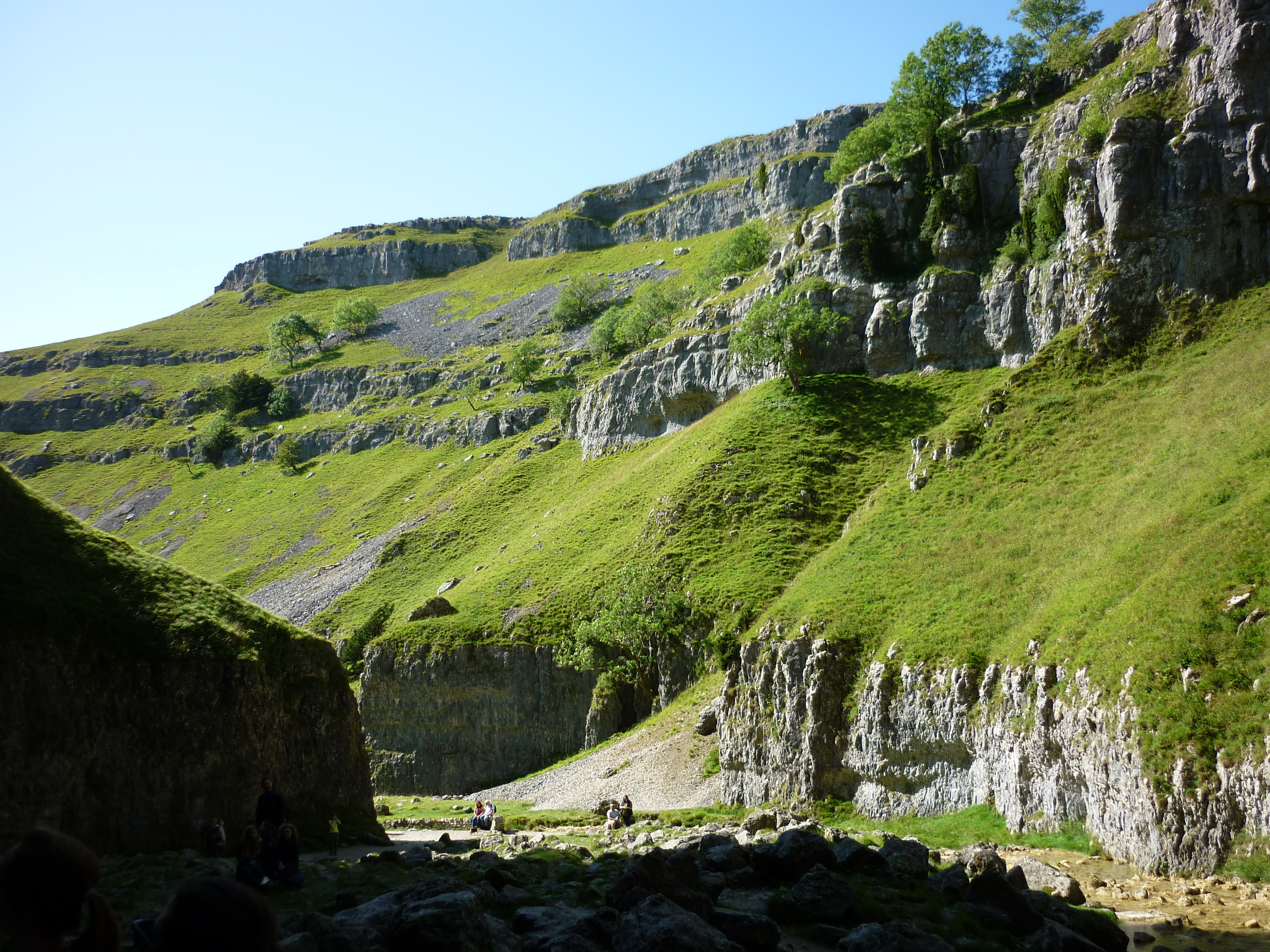
- National park entrance sign, near Skipton, and Gordale Scar

- Location and extent of the Yorkshire Dales National Park, as of August 2016
- Location: North Yorkshire, Westmorland and Furness & Lancashire, England
- Coordinates: 54°15′N 2°13′W
- Area: 2,178 km^{2} (841 sq mi)
- Max. elevation: Whernside; 736 m (2,415 ft)
- Designation: National Park
- Established: 1954
- Named for: Yorkshire Dales
- Governing body: Yorkshire Dales National Park Authority
- Website: www.yorkshiredales.org.uk

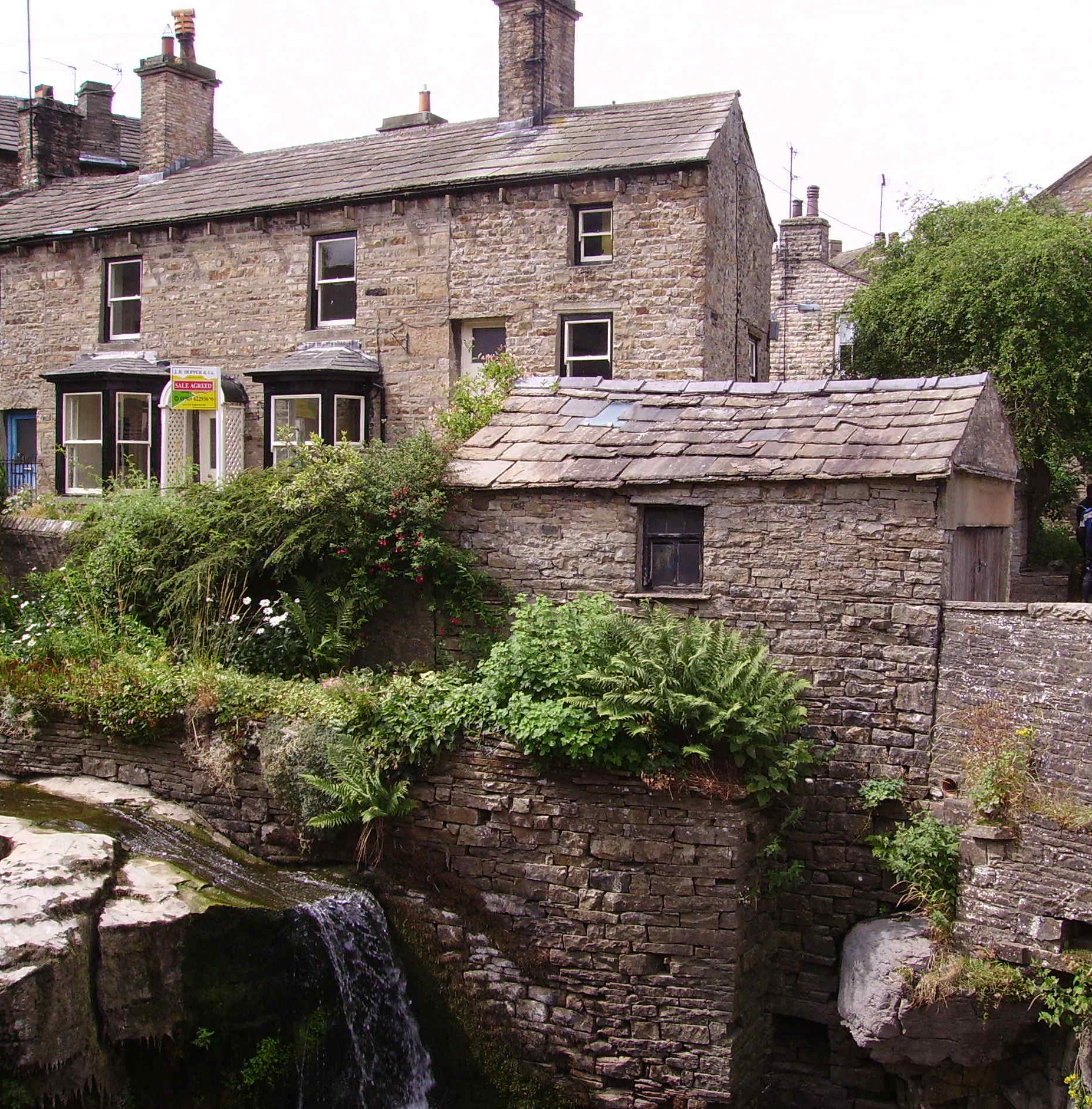
Stone houses in Hawes, a typical example of Dales architecture

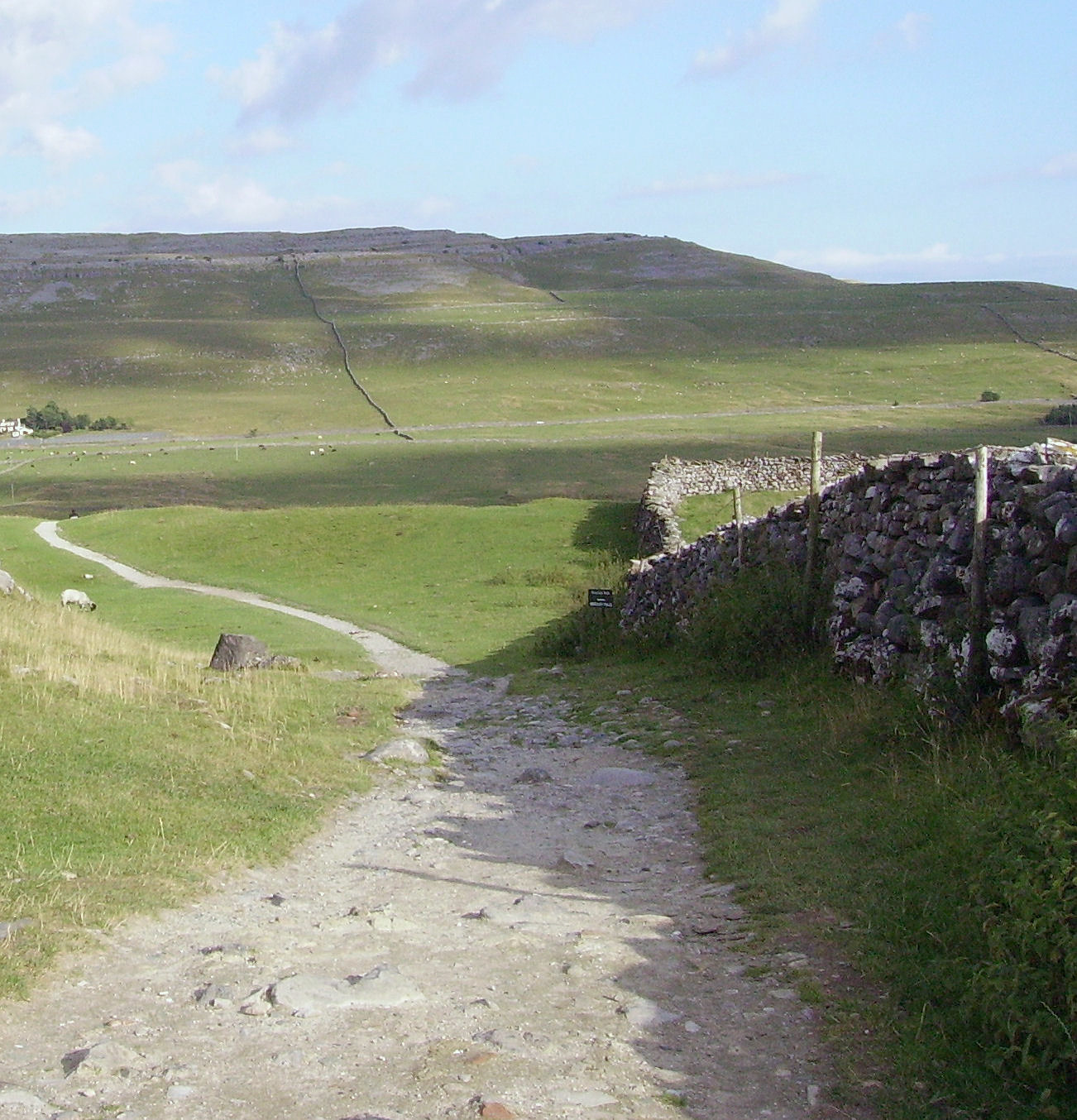
Limestone hills and dry-stone walls in the west of the Yorkshire Dales. This part of the national park is popular with walkers due to the presence of the Yorkshire three peaks.

The Yorkshire Dales National Park is a 2,178 km^{2} (841 sq mi) national park in England which covers most of the Yorkshire Dales, the Howgill Fells, and the Orton Fells. The Nidderdale area of the Yorkshire Dales is not within the national park, and has instead been designated a national landscape. Most of the park is within North Yorkshire, with a sizeable area in Cumbria and a small part in Lancashire. The park was designated in 1954, and extended in 2016. More than 95% of the land in the park is privately owned; there are over 1,000 farms in this area.

In 2020, the national park was named an International Dark Sky Reserve. This means the park has "low levels of light pollution, ideal conditions for stargazing and astronomy".

As of 2017, some 23,500 residents live within the park boundary; a 2018 report estimated that the park attracted more than four million visitors per year. The economy consists primarily of tourism and agriculture.

== Location ==
The park is 50 miles (80 km) north-east of Manchester; Otley, Ilkley, Leeds and Bradford lie to the south, while Kendal is to the west, Darlington to the north-east and Harrogate to the south-east.

The national park does not include all the Yorkshire Dales. Parts of the dales to the south and east of the national park are located in the Nidderdale Area of Outstanding Natural Beauty. The national park includes the Howgill Fells and Orton Fells in the north-west although they are not often considered part of the Dales.

== History ==
=== Creation ===
In 1947, the Hobhouse Report recommended the creation of the Yorkshire Dales National Park covering parts of the West Riding and North Riding of Yorkshire. The proposed National Park included most of the Yorkshire Dales, but not Nidderdale. Accordingly, Nidderdale was not included in the National Park when it was designated in 1954. In 1963 the then West Riding County Council proposed that Nidderdale should be added to the National Park, but the proposal met with opposition from the district councils which would have lost some of their powers to the county council.

Following the Local Government Act 1972 most of the area of the national park was transferred in 1974 to the new county of North Yorkshire. An area in the north west of the national park (Dentdale, Garsdale and the town of Sedbergh) was transferred from the West Riding of Yorkshire to the new county of Cumbria. In 1997 management of the national park passed from the county councils to the Yorkshire Dales National Park Authority.

=== 2016 extension ===
A westward extension of the park into Lancashire and Westmorland encompassed much of the area between the old boundaries of the park and the M6 motorway. This increased the area by nearly 24% and brought the park close to the towns of Kirkby Lonsdale, Kirkby Stephen and Appleby-in-Westmorland. The extension also includes the northern portion of the Howgill Fells and most of the Orton Fells. The expansion brought in parts of historic Lancashire and Westmorland to join part of North Yorkshire and the south-western part of Cumbria.

== Tourism ==
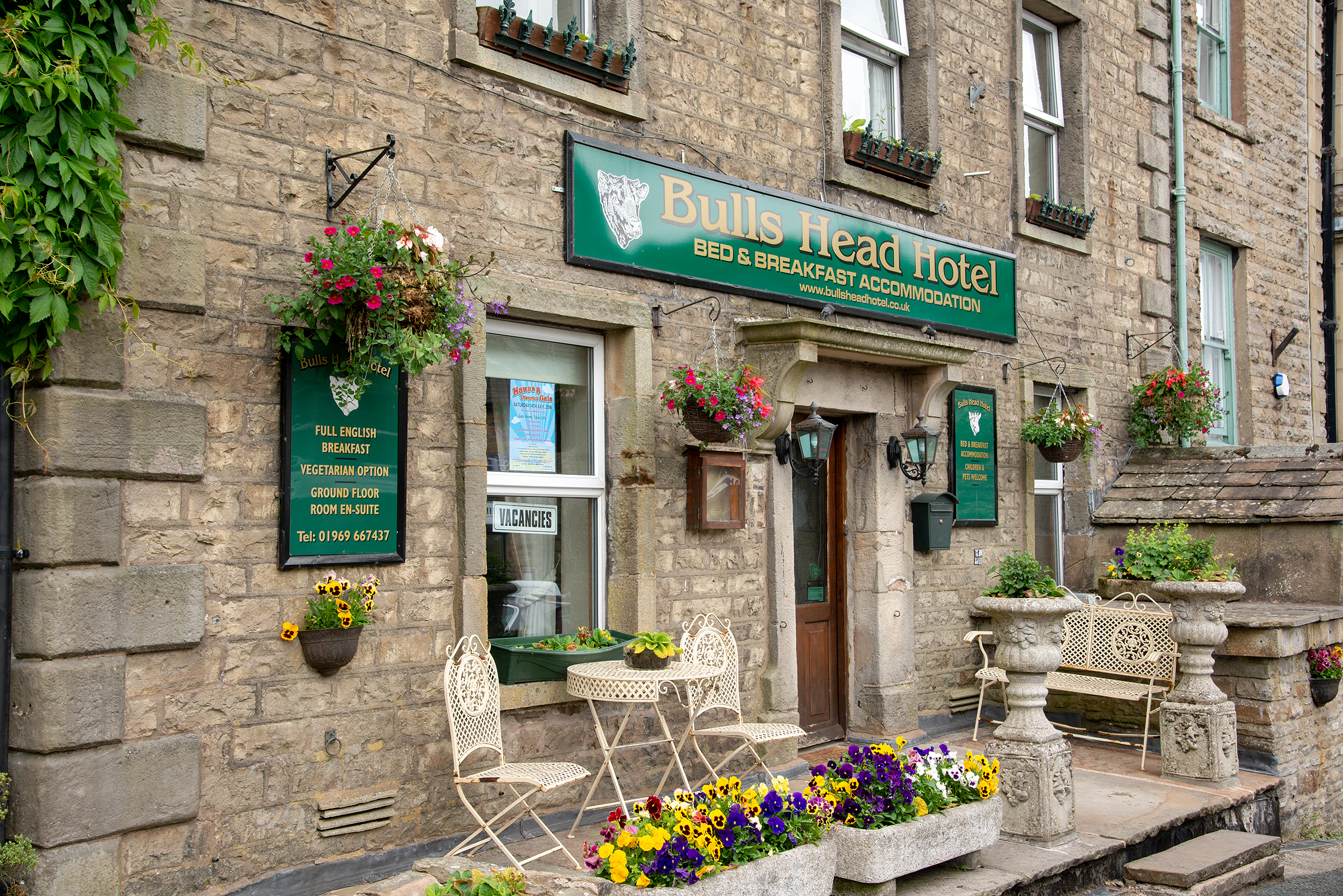
A traditional hotel in Hawes

The area has a wide range of activities for visitors. For example, many people come to the Dales for walking or other exercise. Several long-distance routes cross the park, including the Pennine Way, the Dales Way, the Coast to Coast Walk and the Pennine Bridleway. Cycling is also popular and there are several cycleways.

The DalesBus service provides service in the Dales on certain days in summer, "including the Yorkshire Dales National Park and Nidderdale Area of Outstanding Natural Beauty". In summer, these buses supplement the other services that operate year-round in the Dales.

Tourism in the region declined due to restrictions necessitated by the COVID-19 pandemic in 2020, and into 2021. Later in 2021, the volume of visits was expected to increase as a result of the 2020 TV series All Creatures Great and Small, largely filmed within the Dales. The first series aired in the UK in September 2020 and in the US in early 2021. One source stated that visits to Yorkshire websites had increased significantly by late September 2020. By early 2021, the Discover England website was using the tag line "Discover All Creatures Great and Small in Yorkshire".

The Dales Countryside Museum is housed in the converted Hawes railway station in Wensleydale in the north of the area. The park also has five visitor centres. These are at:

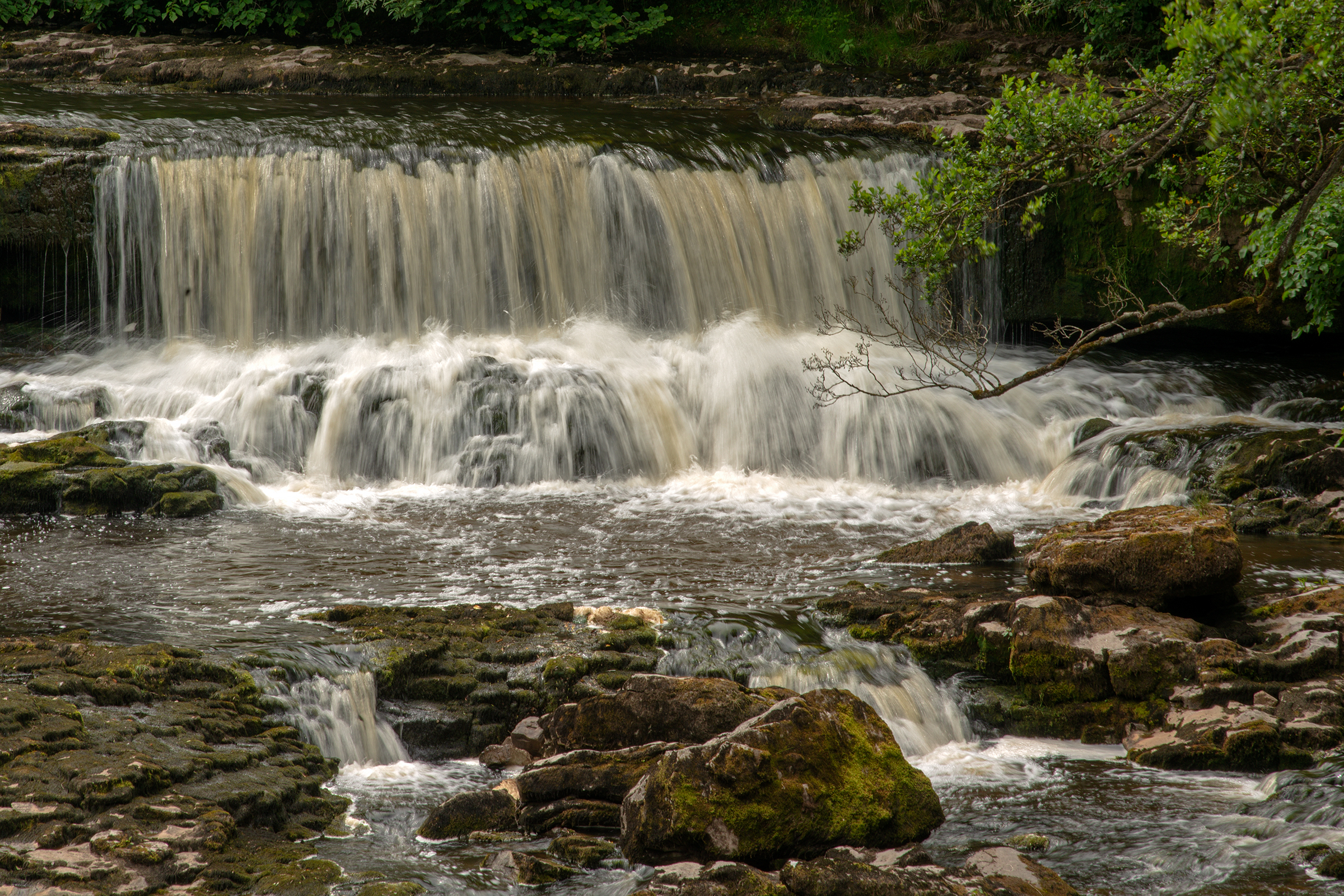
A small section of Aysgarth Falls

- Aysgarth Falls
- Grassington
- Hawes
- Malham
- Reeth

Other places and sights within the National Park include:

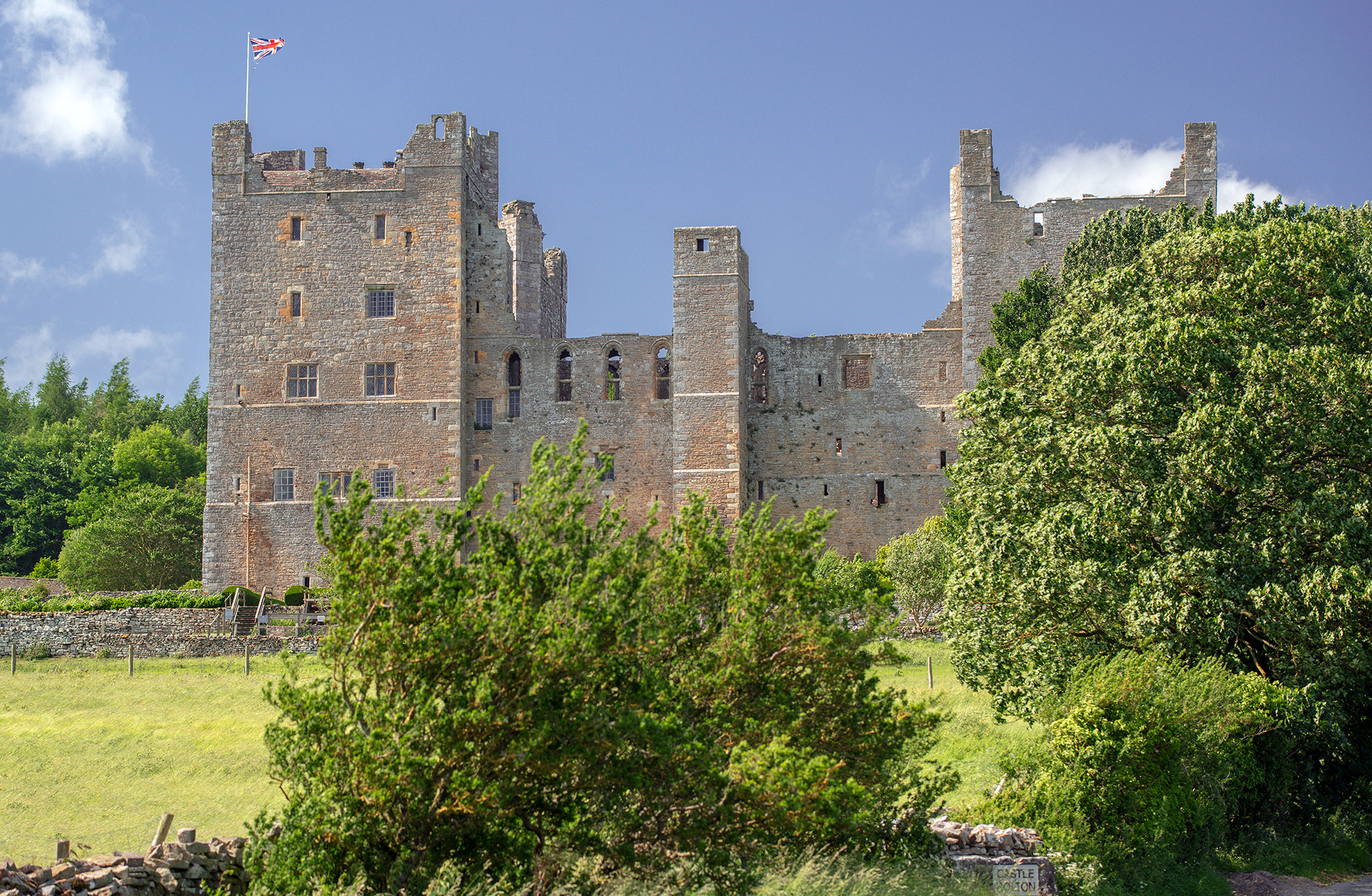
Bolton Castle

- Bolton Castle
- Clapham
- Cautley Spout waterfall
- Firbank Fell
- Gaping Gill
- Gayle Mill
- Hardraw Force
- Horton in Ribblesdale
- Howgill Fells
- Kisdon Force (waterfall) in Swaledale
- Leck Fell
- Malham Cove, Gordale Scar, Janet's Foss and Malham Tarn
- Orton Fells
- River Lune
- Sedbergh
- Settle
- Settle and Carlisle Railway including the Ribblehead Viaduct
- Wild Boar Fell
- The Yorkshire Three Peaks (Ingleborough, Pen-y-ghent and Whernside)
