= Friar Garth Farmhouse =

Farmhouse in Malham, North Yorkshire, England

Coordinates: 54.06169°N 2.14858°W

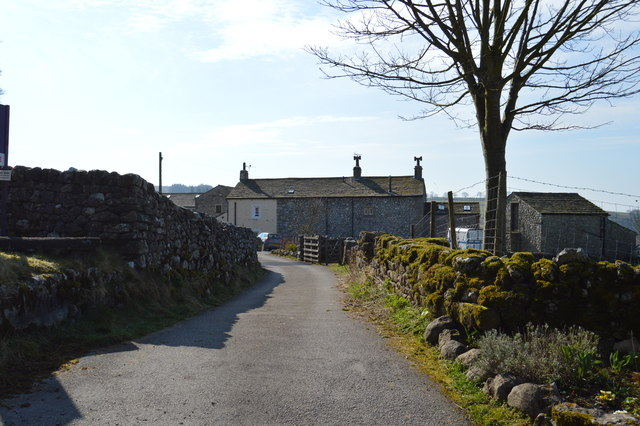
View from the north

Friar Garth Farmhouse is a Grade II listed building in Malham, North Yorkshire, England. It was listed as an historic site by English Heritage on 13 September 1988.

In the 13th century, Malham belonged to the monks of Fountains Abbey, who controlled the land west of Malham Beck, and Bolton Priory who controlled the east. Friar Garth was built in Malham East in the late 16th century for the bailiff (or steward) of Bolton Priory. It also housed the Priory's sheepfolds, stack yard, and tithe barn.

At the Dissolution of the Monasteries in 1536, the estates of Bolton Priory were bought by the Lambert family and afterwards divided into smaller farms, of which Friar Garth was one. Since that time, although the building style has changed, the layout of Malham has remained much the same. Friar Garth itself is now divided into four separate houses and is no longer a working farm.

== See also ==
- Listed buildings in Malham
