= Great Asby Scar =

Limestone pavement in Cumbria

- Site of Special Scientific Interest
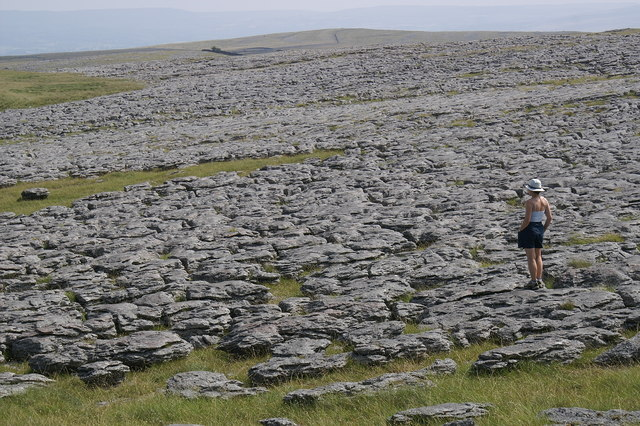

- Location in Eden, Cumbria Location in Cumbria, England
- Location of Great Asby Scar.
- Area of search: Cumbria
- Grid reference: NY655097
- Coordinates: 54.4774°N 2.546°W
- Interest: Biological/Geological
- Area: 1.35 square miles (350.2605 ha)
- Notification date: 29 May 1986
- Location map: Magic Map (Defra)

Great Asby Scar is a Site of Special Scientific Interest (SSSI) and National Nature Reserve in Cumbria, UK. It is an area of limestone pavement, south of the village of Great Asby. It is located within Yorkshire Dales National Park.

== History ==
A "scar" is the local name for a limestone pavement—an area of limestone rock which has been eroded by an overlying ice sheet during the Last Glacial Maximum and then fissured by rain to form a flat rocky pattern which resembles man-made pavement. Many limestone pavements in the UK have been exploited by quarrying but this example is comparatively extensive and unspoilt.

The overall area of pavement covers about 15 square miles (39 km^{2}) and is called the Westmorland Scars. Great Asby Scar is in the centre of this region. Other scars include Orton Scar, Grange Scar, and Little Asby Scar.

== Site location and designation ==
It is in the Orton Fells in the district of Westmorland and Furness, near the village of Great Asby. Great Asby Scar was first designated as a Site of Special Scientific Interest in 1969 and the designation covers an area of about 864 acres (350 ha). It was also designated as a National Nature Reserve in 1976 and that designation covers an area of about 409.5 acres (165.7 ha).

A walled settlement was constructed on a small plateau, covering an area of about 1.25 acres. This is known as Castle Folds and, as it dates back to Roman times, is protected as a scheduled monument.

== Flora ==
The region has been described as a matrix of both acidic and alkaline grassland, dominated by blue moor-grass and matgrass. Various other species have been known to exist in this region, including rare species of buckler ferns and limestone ferns. As the area is quite exposed, the vegetation tends to grow in the crevices between the limestone blocks which are known as grykes. Notable species include autumn gentian, helleborines and Solomon's Seal.

== Fauna ==
The area is quite bleak and barren. The most notable creature is a rare snail, Vitrea subrimata.
