= Castlesteads =

Castlesteads may refer to one of the following:

- Castlesteads, Greater Manchester, an Iron Age promontory fort
- Castle Folds, a Romano-British fortified settlement
- Camboglanna, also known as Castlesteads, a Roman fort on Hadrian's Wall
- Lowther Castle Stead, a medieval castle in Cumbria
