= Gordale Scar =

Limestone ravine in North Yorkshire, England

Coordinates: 54°04′19″N 2°07′51″W

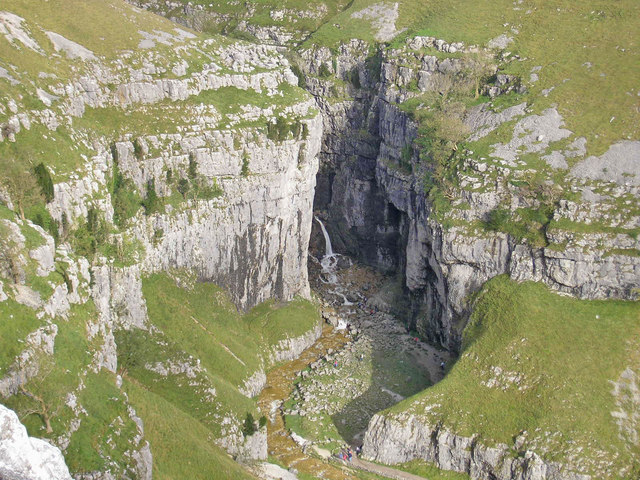
- An aerial view of the scar

Geology
- Type: Limestone ravine

Geography
- Location: 1 mile (1.6 km) north-east of Malham, North Yorkshire, England
- Interactive map of Gordale Scar

Gordale Scar is a limestone ravine 1 mile (1.6 km) north-east of Malham, North Yorkshire, England. It contains two waterfalls and has overhanging limestone cliffs over 330 feet (100 m) high. The gorge could have been formed by water from melting glaciers or a cavern collapse. The stream flowing through the scar is Gordale Beck, which on leaving the gorge flows over Janet's Foss before joining Malham Beck 2 miles (3 km) downstream to form the River Aire. A right of way leads up the gorge, but requires climbing approximately 10 feet (3 m) of tufa at the lower waterfall.

Gordale Scar is situated within the protected area: Malham-Arncliffe SSSI.

== Notable visitors ==
William Wordsworth wrote in the sonnet Gordale, "let thy feet repair to Gordale chasm, terrific as the lair where the young lions couch".

James Ward created a large and imaginative painting of it that can be seen in Tate Britain. J. M. W. Turner also painted a picture of it in 1816, also to be seen in Tate Britain.

Colin Tudge references this feature and James Ward's painting in his book The Time Before History.

The waterfall was used as an exterior filming location in the 1982 film The Dark Crystal. Goredale Scar appears in the Netflix series The Witcher (S2 E3: "What is Lost").

== Image gallery ==
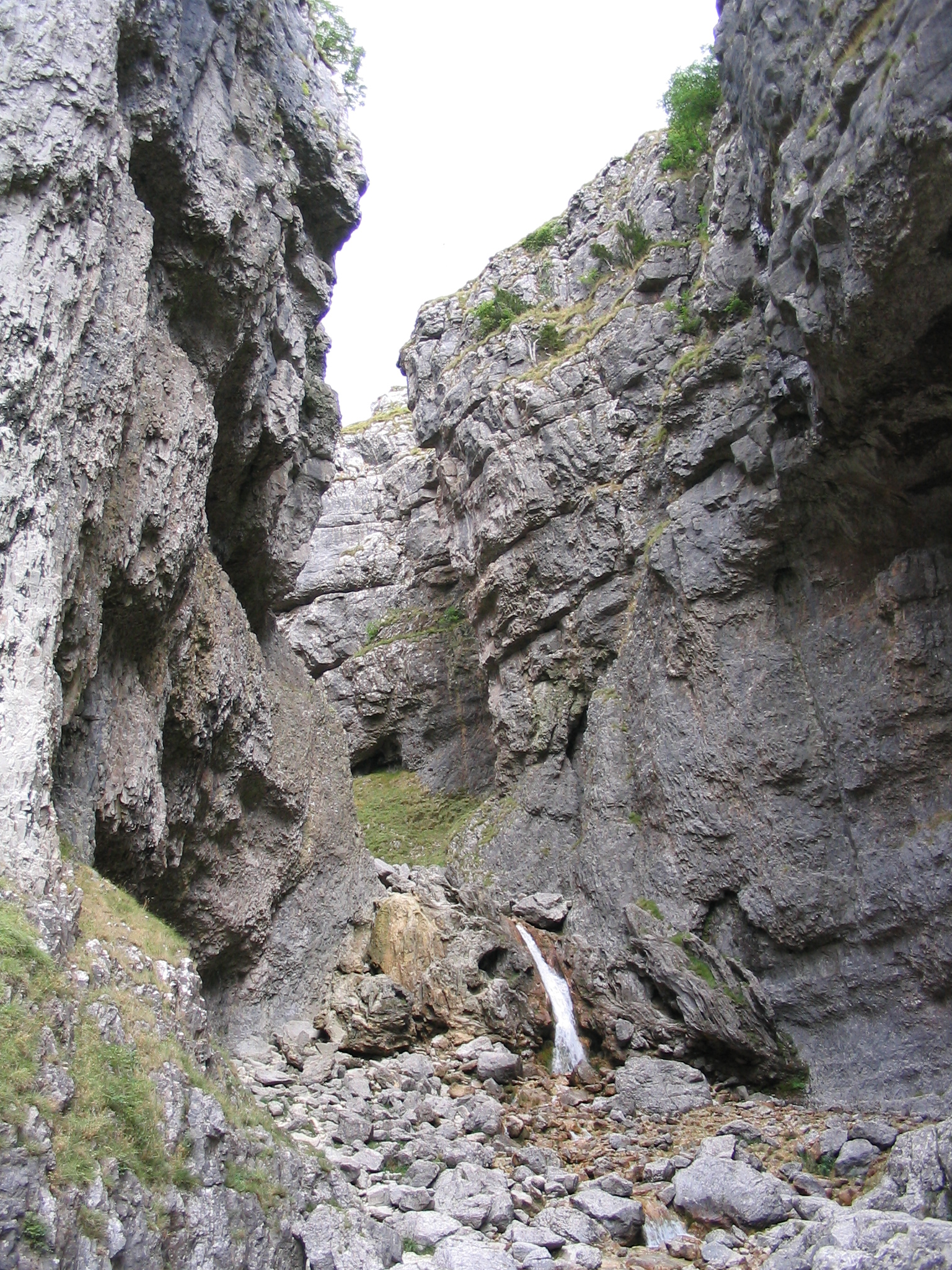
The entrance to the ravine

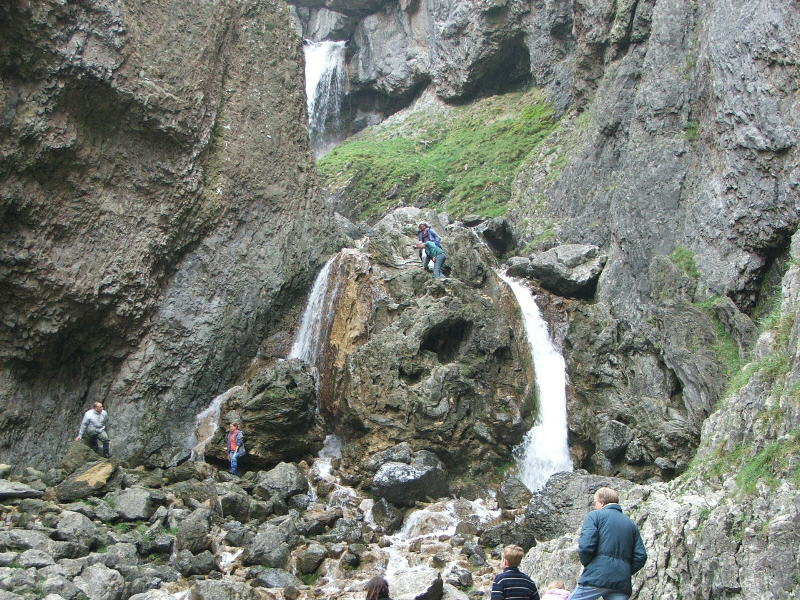
The first hurdle..

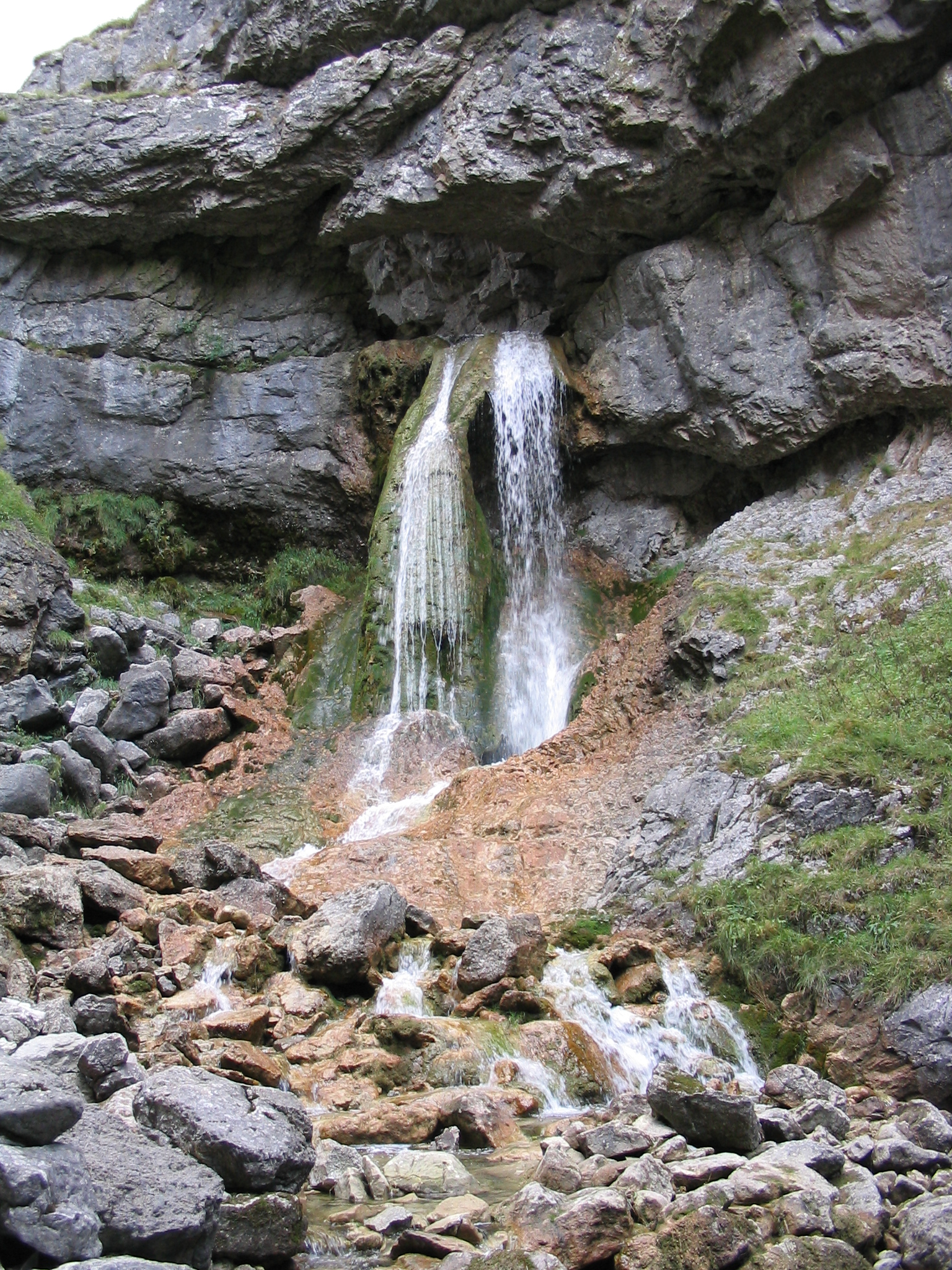
The upper waterfall

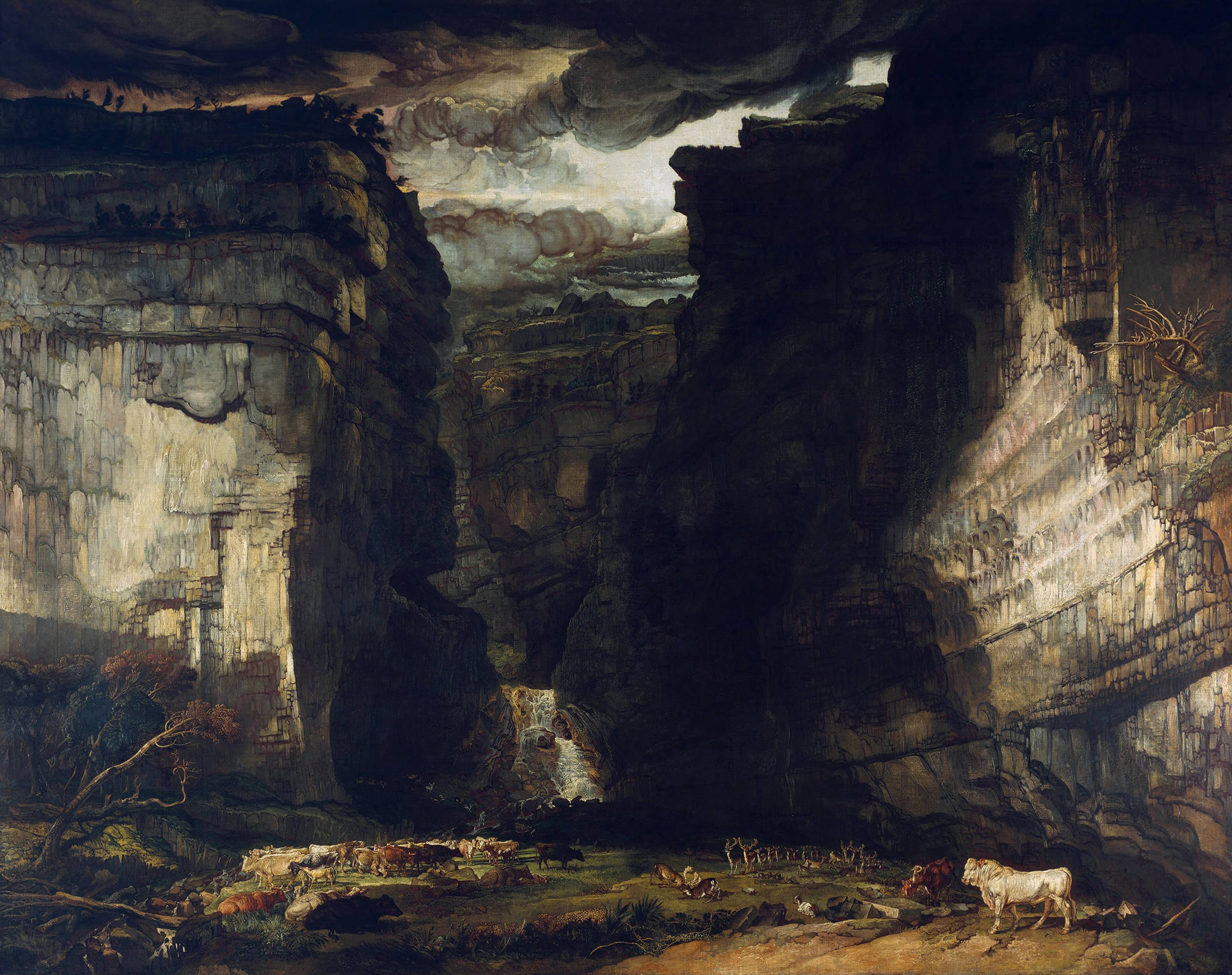
Gordale Scar, 1814 painting by James Ward

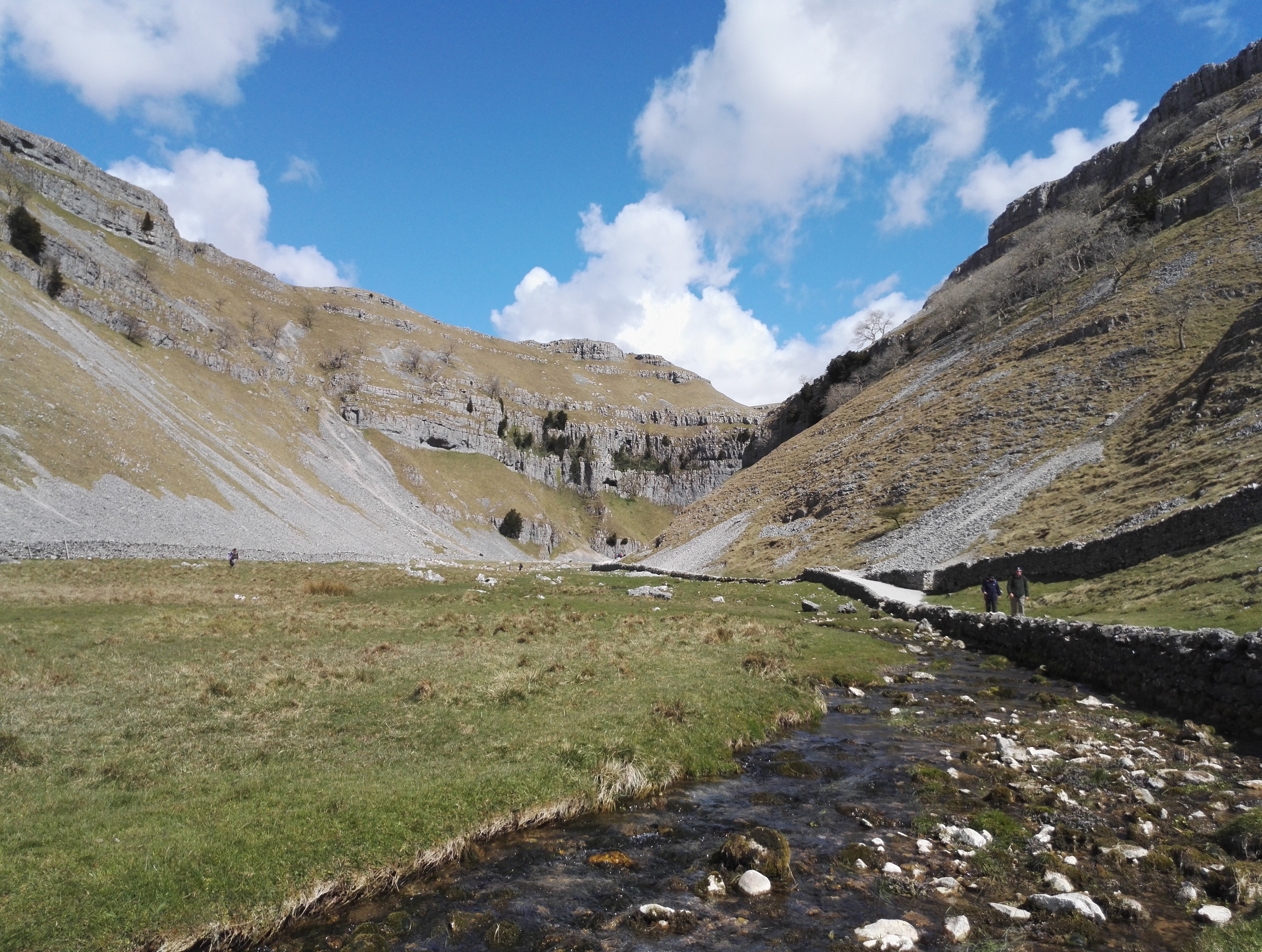
The valley just downstream from Gordale Scar.

== See also ==
- List of waterfalls
- List of waterfalls in England
