= Lister Arms =

Pub in Malham, North Yorkshire, England

Coordinates: 54.0619°N 2.1523°W

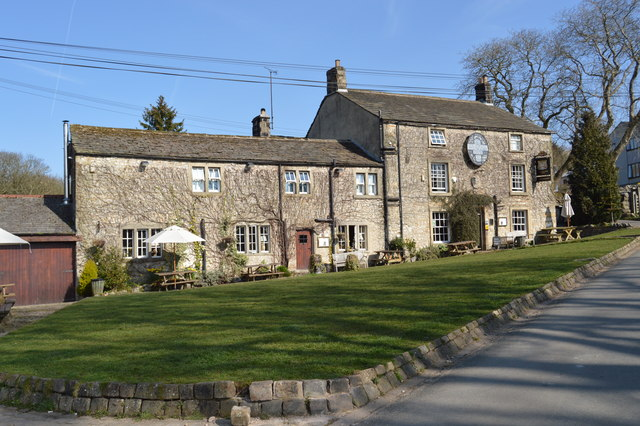
- The pub in 2015

General information
- Address: Malham, North Yorkshire, England
- Completed: 1723
- Renovated: Early 19th century (heightened and altered)

Technical details
- Floor count: 3
- Designations

Listed Building – Grade II
- Official name: Lister Arms Hotel
- Designated: 20 February 1958
- Reference no.: 1301333

The Lister Arms is a historic public house in Malham, a village in North Yorkshire, in England.

The inn was built in 1723, while in the early 19th century it was heightened, and the windows were altered. The barn and stable range, to the left, was later converted to provide more accommodation. The bar area has stone floors and fireplaces, while the restaurant area has wooden floors and original fireplaces and beams. The pub claimed in 2022 to sell 12,000 steak and ale pies each year. The building was Grade II listed in 1958.

The building is constructed of stone, the left gable rendered, with quoins and a stone slate roof. The main block has three storeys and two bays. The doorway has plain pilasters and a cornice, and above it is a datestone with initials and a wine glass. The windows have raised surrounds; on the ground floor they are sashes, and above they date from the 20th century. To the left is a two-storey former barn and stable range that has been altered, and at the rear is a lean-to with a re-set moulded lintel dated 1702.

== See also ==
- Listed buildings in Malham
