= Listed buildings in Malham =

Malham is a civil parish in the county of North Yorkshire, England. It contains 21 listed buildings that are recorded in the National Heritage List for England. All the listed buildings are designated at Grade II, the lowest of the three grades, which is applied to "buildings of national importance and special interest". The parish contains the village of Malham and the surrounding countryside. Most of the listed buildings are houses, cottages and associated structures, farmhouses and farm buildings, and the others include a boundary stone, a public house, two bridges, a former school and a telephone kiosk.

== Buildings ==
Name and location	Photograph	Date	Notes
Weets Cross; 54.06480°N 2.11577°W		Medieval	The boundary stone is in gritstone, and consists of a shaft about 1.5 metres (4 ft 11 in) high, set into a rectangular base. There are no visible inscriptions, but on the southwest face are six notches.
Hill Top Farmhouse and Cottage; 54.06344°N 2.15504°W	—	1617	The building is in stone with a stone slate roof. There are two storeys and six bays, and a later two-bay extension to the left. On the front is a two-storey projecting gabled porch containing an entrance with a moulded surround, a basket-arched head and moulded spandrels, above which is a datestone with a hood mould. In the upper floor is a mullioned window with a hood mould, a pigeon loft with 22 holes in a triangular pattern, and a pyramidal finial on the apex. Elsewhere, there are mullioned windows, and inside is an inglenook fireplace.
Moons Town Head Farmhouse; 54.06482°N 2.15564°W	—	Early 17th century	A farmhouse, with a stable later incorporated, in limewashed stone, with stone dressings, the house with a slate roof and stone coping to the left gable, and the former stable with a stone slate roof. The house has two storeys and four bays, and it contains a doorway with a chamfered surround and a chamfered basket-arched lintel. Most of the windows are mullioned, with some mullions missing, and some with hood moulds. The former stable has two storeys and two bays, and its openings include a pitching door.
Friar Garth Farmhouse; 54.06193°N 2.14889°W		17th century	The farmhouse is in stone with a stone slate roof. There are two storeys and three bays. The doorway has a chamfered surround, and the windows are mullioned.
Holme House Farmhouse; 54.06058°N 2.15327°W		17th century	The farmhouse is in stone with eaves modillions and a stone slate roof. There are two storeys and four bays. In the second bay is a doorway with a plain surround, and projecting from the fourth bay is a gabled porch. In the right bay are sash windows, and elsewhere the windows are casements.
Hudsons Town Head Farmhouse; 54.06466°N 2.15621°W	—	17th century	A barn and a farmhouse, later combined, it is pebbledashed, with stone dressings, quoins and a stone slate roof. There are two storeys, and three bays, the right two bays slightly lower. The doorway has a plain surround, and the windows are a mix; most are mullioned, and there are also sashes and casements.
Priory Farmhouse; 54.06312°N 2.15123°W	—	Late 17th to early 18th century	The farmhouse is in rendered stone, and has a stone slate roof. There are two storeys and three bays. On the front is a porch, and a doorway with a chamfered surround, and the windows are mullioned.
Lister Arms Hotel; 54.06202°N 2.15232°W		1723	The public house is in stone, the left gable rendered, with quoins and a stone slate roof. The main block has three storeys and two bays. The doorway has plain pilasters and a cornice, and above it is a datestone with initials and a wine glass. The windows have raised surrounds; in the ground floor they are sashes, and above they date from the 20th century. To the left is a two-storey former barn and stable range that has been altered, and at the rear is a lean-to with a re-set moulded dated lintel.
Town End Cottage; 54.06022°N 2.15317°W	—	1732	The house is in stone, with a stone slate roof, two storeys and two bays. The windows are mullioned, the doorway is in the left return and has a moulded surround. To the left is a later recessed bay with two storeys and one bay.
Barn north of Moons Town Head Farmhouse; 54.06495°N 2.15588°W	—	18th century	The barn is in stone with a stone slate roof. There are two bays, and an outshut on the left with a catslide roof. The barn contains a doorway with a chamfered surround and a flat-arched head, and a segmental-arched entrance in the central porch.
Clapper bridge 54.06332°N 2.15346°W		18th century (possible)	The clapper bridge crosses Malham Beck. It is in limestone,and consists of four slabs on three stone piers.
Hall Cottage, Rose Cottage and Old Post Cottage; 54.06162°N 2.15330°W		18th century	A row of five, later three, cottages in stone with a stone slate roof, and two storeys. The left cottage is limewashed, the right cottage is rendered, and the doorways have plain surrounds. The left cottage contains re-used 17th-century mullioned windows with hood moulds, five lights in the ground floor, and three lights above, the middle light stepped. The other cottages have a mix of sashes and casements, and the right cottage has a gabled porch.
New Bridge; 54.06146°N 2.15265°W		18th century (probable)	The bridge carries a road over Malham Beck, and has been widened on the upstream side. It consists of a single segmental span with parapets.
Former Post Office; 54.06147°N 2.15288°W	—	18th century	A house and a shop, at one time a post office, in limewashed stone, with stone dressings, a stone slate roof and two storeys. The house has two bays, The central doorway has a moulded surround, and the windows are mullioned with plain surrounds. The shop to the right has one bay, and is slightly recessed. In the ground floor is a shop entrance, and above is a two-light mullioned window.
Tennant House and Cottage; 54.06107°N 2.15224°W	—	18th century	The house and cottage are in limewashed stone, with stone dressings, quoins and a stone slate roof. There are two storeys and three bays. The doorway on the left has a plain surround, square caps and an entablature. To its right is a three-light mullioned window, and the other windows are sashes with plain surrounds.
Mantley Field Laithe; 54.06281°N 2.14048°W		1755	The field barn is in stone, with quoins, a stone slate roof, and three bays. In the centre is a projecting wagon porch, and to the left is a doorway with a dated and initialled lintel. In the left return is a pitching hole, and in the right gable is a vent.
The Old School; 54.06327°N 2.15054°W		Late 18th century	A school, later a house, in stone, with a stone slate roof. There is one storey and three bays. In the right bay is a porch with a round-headed entrance and a re-set datestone. The windows have round heads and keystones.
Mires Field House; 54.06074°N 2.15204°W	—	Early 19th century	The house is rendered, and has stone dressings, chamfered quoins, a sill band, bracketed eaves, and a slate roof. There are two storeys and three bays. The central doorway has a plain surround, a rectangular fanlight and a moulded hood. The windows are sashes with plain surrounds.
Hill Top House; 54.06419°N 2.15534°W		c. 1830	The house is in sandstone, with a string course, dentilled eaves in the middle bay, and a stone slate roof. There are two storeys and three bays. The middle bay is recessed, and contains a Greek Revival portico with unfluted Doric columns and a plain entablature. The windows are two-light sashes with wedge lintels, plain sill, and a recessed panel below. At the rear is a central doorway with a moulded gabled head.
Garden wall north of Hill Top Farmhouse; 54.06380°N 2.15499°W	—	Middle 19th century (probable)	The wall is in limestone with triangular coping. It encloses a rectangular garden about 30 metres (98 ft) by 12 metres (39 ft), and contains two entrances. A garden house has been built within the garden.
Telephone kiosk 54.06162°N 2.15308°W		1935	The K6 type telephone kiosk in Cove Road was designed by Giles Gilbert Scott. Constructed in cast iron with a square plan and a dome, it has three unperforated crowns in the top panels.
