= HMS Malham =

Minesweeper of the Royal Navy

History

United Kingdom
- Name: Malham
- Namesake: Malham
- Builder: Fairlie Yacht
- Launched: 29 August 1958
- Completed: 10 December 1958
- Fate: transferred to Ghana, October 1959

Ghana
- Name: Yogada
- Acquired: October 1959
- Commissioned: 31 October 1959
- Fate: broken up, 1977

General characteristics
- Class & type: Ham-class minesweeper
- Displacement: 120 tons standard; 164 tons full
- Length: 106 ft 6 in (32.46 m)
- Beam: 22 ft (6.7 m)
- Draught: 5 ft 9 in (1.75 m)
- Propulsion: 2 shaft Paxman 12YHAXM diesels, 1,100 bhp (820 kW)
- Speed: 14 knots (26 km/h)
- Complement: 2 officers, 13 ratings
- Armament: 1 × Bofors 40 mm L/60 gun / 20 mm Oerlikon gun
- Notes: Pennant number(s): M2789 / IMS89

HMS Malham was one of 93 ships of the Ham class of inshore minesweepers.

Their names were all chosen from villages ending in -ham. The minesweeper was named after Malham in North Yorkshire.
