= Castle Folds =

Ancient fortified settlement in England

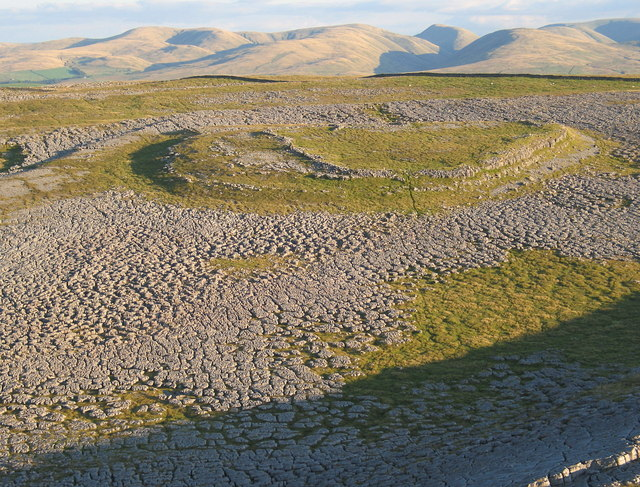

- Location in Eden, Cumbria Location in Cumbria, England
- 54.47808°N 2.54029°W
- Type: hut circle settlement and shieling
- Periods: Roman Britain
- Location: Cumbria, England grid reference NY6501409305

Scheduled monument
- Designated: 8 December 1938
- Reference no.: 1011141

Castle Folds or Castlesteads was a Romano-British walled settlement on Great Asby Scar – an area of limestone pavement in the parish of Asby, Cumbria, England. In medieval times, it was used as a shieling – a temporary summer shelter. It is now in ruins but is protected as a scheduled monument.

== Construction ==
The settlement covered most of a small knoll on the limestone pavement of the scar. A walled enclosure surrounded most of the knoll and, on the western side, the eight-foot thick walls extended the steep escarpment of the knoll to form a significant obstacle. The area enclosed is about 1.25 acres (0.51 ha). There were about a dozen stone huts built into the walls of the enclosure so that the central space was open.

The wall was constructed from orthostats – standing stone slabs – which enclosed rubble. A parapet would have made the wall's height about thirteen feet in total – comparable with a standard Roman vallum. The construction of the walls and huts is not Roman in pattern and R. G. Collingwood suggested that this was an example of the castella Brigantum (forts of the Brigantes), which appear in the work of Juvenal.

The substantial wall, elevation and surrounding stone pavement made the settlement well-fortified and better protected than other comparable settlements, which only aimed to deter light raids and thefts of stock. The outside slabs at the base of the wall have all been ripped out which indicates that the wall was destroyed by hostile action.

The later medieval shieling was a rectangle of about 24 by 10 yards (21.9 m × 9.1 m) next to the south wall. There was a partition wall making it into two rooms.
