= Orton Fells =

Upland area in North England

Coordinates: 54.499°N 2.587°W

The Orton Fells is an upland area in Northern England, mostly consisting of limestone hills, plateaus and moorlands. Historically in Westmorland, the area lies within the modern county of Cumbria and is bounded by the Lake District to the west, the Eden Valley to the north and east, and the Yorkshire Dales and Howgill Fells to the south. The area mostly falls within the boundaries of the Yorkshire Dales National Park while a small part of the western fells is in the Lake District National Park. The fells are one of 159 National Character Areas defined by Natural England.

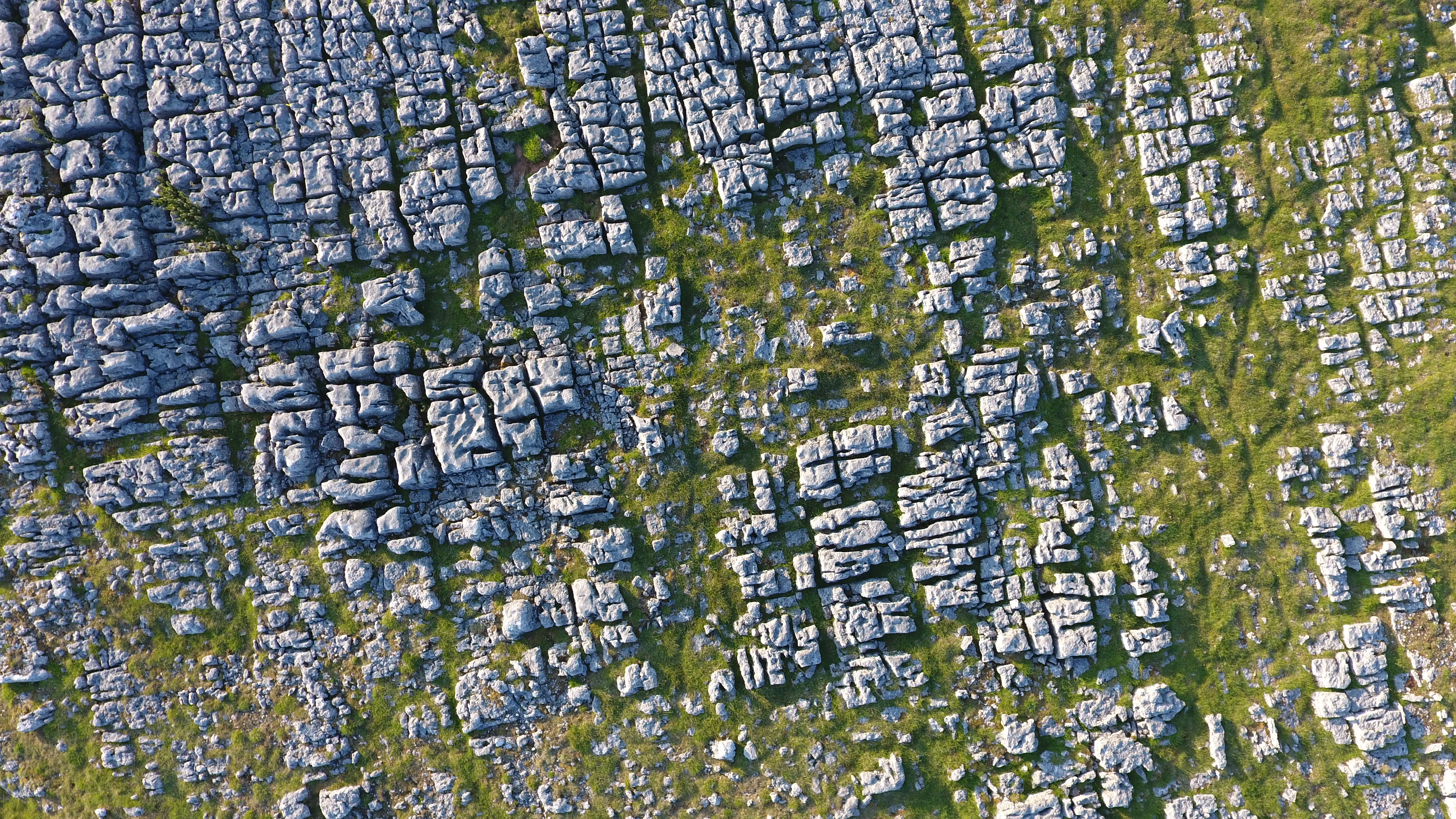
Limestone pavement on Orton Scar, Cumbria, England

Most settlements are in the lower land of the central upland region and the area is bounded by the villages of Orton, Great Asby, Little Asby, Crosby Ravensworth and Crosby Garret. Other settlements in the area include Ravenstonedale, Soulby, Maulds Meaburn, King's Meaburn, Morland, and Cliburn, and many of the settlements have conservation area status. Abrasion by glaciers and natural weathering of the limestone has created deep fissures, breaking the pavement into blocks, most of which was damaged by mining over the centuries. The Great Asby Scar, near Great Asby, and Orton Scars, near Orton, are two remaining examples in Britain.

The rolling hills contain improved pasture with limestone walls or fences with some hedgerows and farming in the area is usually sheep with some other livestock while grass is grown for hay and silage in the valleys. Heather is found on the moorland and tree cover is mostly sparse except in small groups with a mix of broad-leaved and coniferous trees, with Ash trees being quite common. Archaeological remains are located in the area and include ancient villages, stone circles, burial mounds and a Roman road.
