= Malham =

Village and civil parish in North Yorkshire, England

Coordinates: 54.061°N 2.153°W

- Location within North Yorkshire
- Population: 238 (2011 census)
- OS grid reference: SD900629
- Unitary authority: North Yorkshire
- Ceremonial county: North Yorkshire
- Region: Yorkshire and the Humber
- Country: England
- Sovereign state: United Kingdom
- Post town: SKIPTON
- Postcode district: BD23
- Dialling code: 01729
- Police: North Yorkshire
- Fire: North Yorkshire
- Ambulance: Yorkshire
- UK Parliament: Skipton and Ripon

Malham is a village and civil parish in the county of North Yorkshire, England. In the Domesday Book, the name is given as Malgun, meaning "settlement by the gravelly places".

Until 1974 it was part of the Settle Rural District, in the historic West Riding of Yorkshire. From 1974 to 2023 it was part of the Craven District, it is now administered by the unitary North Yorkshire Council.

In 2001 the parish had a population of approximately 150. Malham parish increased in size geographically (to include Malham Moor) and so at the 2011 Census had a population of 238.

Malham lies at the upper end of the valley of the River Aire, known above Airton as Malhamdale, in the Yorkshire Dales. The surrounding countryside is well known for its limestone pavements and other examples of limestone scenery. Tourist attractions include Malham Tarn, Malham Cove, Gordale Scar, Janet's Foss and the Dry Valley.

In the 1950s the village gave its name to a Ham class minesweeper, HMS Malham.

== Governance ==
Malham has a joint parish council, Kirkby Malhamdale Parish Council, with the parishes of Malham Moor, Kirkby Malham and Hanlith.

== Tourism ==
Malham is a popular walkers' destination. The rise in tourism over Malham's history has led to some deterioration of the area's surrounding paths as tourists wander off the paths and cause pockets of erosion, a process often called "footpath erosion". The footpaths in the area are maintained by the Yorkshire Dales National Park Authority.

In the village there is a National Park Information Centre and a large car park. The Pennine Way long-distance path passes through the village. Nearby natural landmarks include Malham Cove, Malham Tarn, Gordale Scar and Janet's Foss. The Malham Show Fell Race course runs over the nearby 301-metre (988 ft) Cawden.

In May 2006, it was reported that a covert listening device was discovered hidden in the local parish hall, leaving the villagers baffled. The electronic transmitter was found in a wall socket during a safety inspection at Malham village hall.

Part of Harry Potter and the Deathly Hallows – Part 1 was filmed around the Malham Cove limestone pavement.

All Creatures Great and Small TV series was largely filmed within the Dales, including some scenes shot in and around Malham Lings and at Janet's Foss waterfall on the Malham Landscape Trail.

Beck Hall in the village is England's first vegan hotel, after making over its menu and room amenities to be free of animal products in 2023. The Lister Arms inn also lies in the village.

== Climate ==
Malham has an Oceanic climate, but is generally colder and wetter than most settlements in Britain. It has a relatively low altitude of around 200 metres, but is partly surrounded by fells. This exposed position means the temperature range is limited, due to little pooling of cold air. Extremes of temperature (since 1960) range from 28.2 °C (82.8 °F) during August 1990, down to −13.5 °C (7.7 °F) during March 2001.

Climate data for Malham Tarn, elevation: 391 m (1,283 ft), 1991–2020 normals, extremes 1960–present
Month	Jan	Feb	Mar	Apr	May	Jun	Jul	Aug	Sep	Oct	Nov	Dec	Year
Record high °C (°F)	12.5 (54.5)	15.3 (59.5)	19.1 (66.4)	21.0 (69.8)	24.0 (75.2)	27.2 (81.0)	28.6 (83.5)	28.2 (82.8)	24.4 (75.9)	20.1 (68.2)	15.2 (59.4)	12.9 (55.2)	28.6 (83.5)
Mean daily maximum °C (°F)	4.8 (40.6)	5.2 (41.4)	7.2 (45.0)	10.0 (50.0)	13.2 (55.8)	15.6 (60.1)	17.4 (63.3)	17.0 (62.6)	14.7 (58.5)	11.1 (52.0)	7.6 (45.7)	5.3 (41.5)	10.8 (51.4)
Daily mean °C (°F)	2.5 (36.5)	2.7 (36.9)	4.1 (39.4)	6.4 (43.5)	9.4 (48.9)	12.0 (53.6)	13.8 (56.8)	13.6 (56.5)	11.5 (52.7)	8.4 (47.1)	5.2 (41.4)	2.9 (37.2)	7.7 (45.9)
Mean daily minimum °C (°F)	0.2 (32.4)	0.1 (32.2)	1.0 (33.8)	2.8 (37.0)	5.5 (41.9)	8.4 (47.1)	10.3 (50.5)	10.2 (50.4)	8.2 (46.8)	5.6 (42.1)	2.8 (37.0)	0.5 (32.9)	4.7 (40.5)
Record low °C (°F)	−11.5 (11.3)	−13.0 (8.6)	−13.5 (7.7)	−7.5 (18.5)	−4.2 (24.4)	−1.1 (30.0)	1.7 (35.1)	2.1 (35.8)	−1.0 (30.2)	−4.9 (23.2)	−9.2 (15.4)	−14.1 (6.6)	−14.1 (6.6)
Average precipitation mm (inches)	164.9 (6.49)	137.9 (5.43)	117.6 (4.63)	91.9 (3.62)	90.9 (3.58)	99.8 (3.93)	118.3 (4.66)	134.2 (5.28)	128.6 (5.06)	156.6 (6.17)	165.6 (6.52)	181.3 (7.14)	1,587.4 (62.50)
Average precipitation days (≥ 1.0 mm)	17.9	15.4	14.5	12.8	12.6	13.5	14.3	15.7	13.9	16.8	18.8	18.3	184.5
Mean monthly sunshine hours	34.6	58.2	90.5	134.5	162.9	137.3	141.3	135.9	106.1	75.4	43.0	34.2	1,153.9
Source 1: Met Office
Source 2: KNMI

== Village events ==
The village hosts an annual agricultural and horticultural show on the Saturday before the August Bank Holiday. Known as the Malham Show, it has competitions for everything from Lego models to fell running. Another major annual event is the Malham Safari, when the villagers and particularly the local school build sculptures around the village. This event attracts many tourists and stalls are put up on the green.

== Places of worship ==
Malham Methodist Church is located in Chapel Gate and is part of the Skipton and Grassington Circuit of the Methodist Church. St Helen's Chapel was an ancient religious foundation mentioned in monastic charters from the twelfth century. It was demolished during the reformation. Archaeological digs at the site have been supported by the Ingleborough Archaeology Group.

== Picture gallery ==
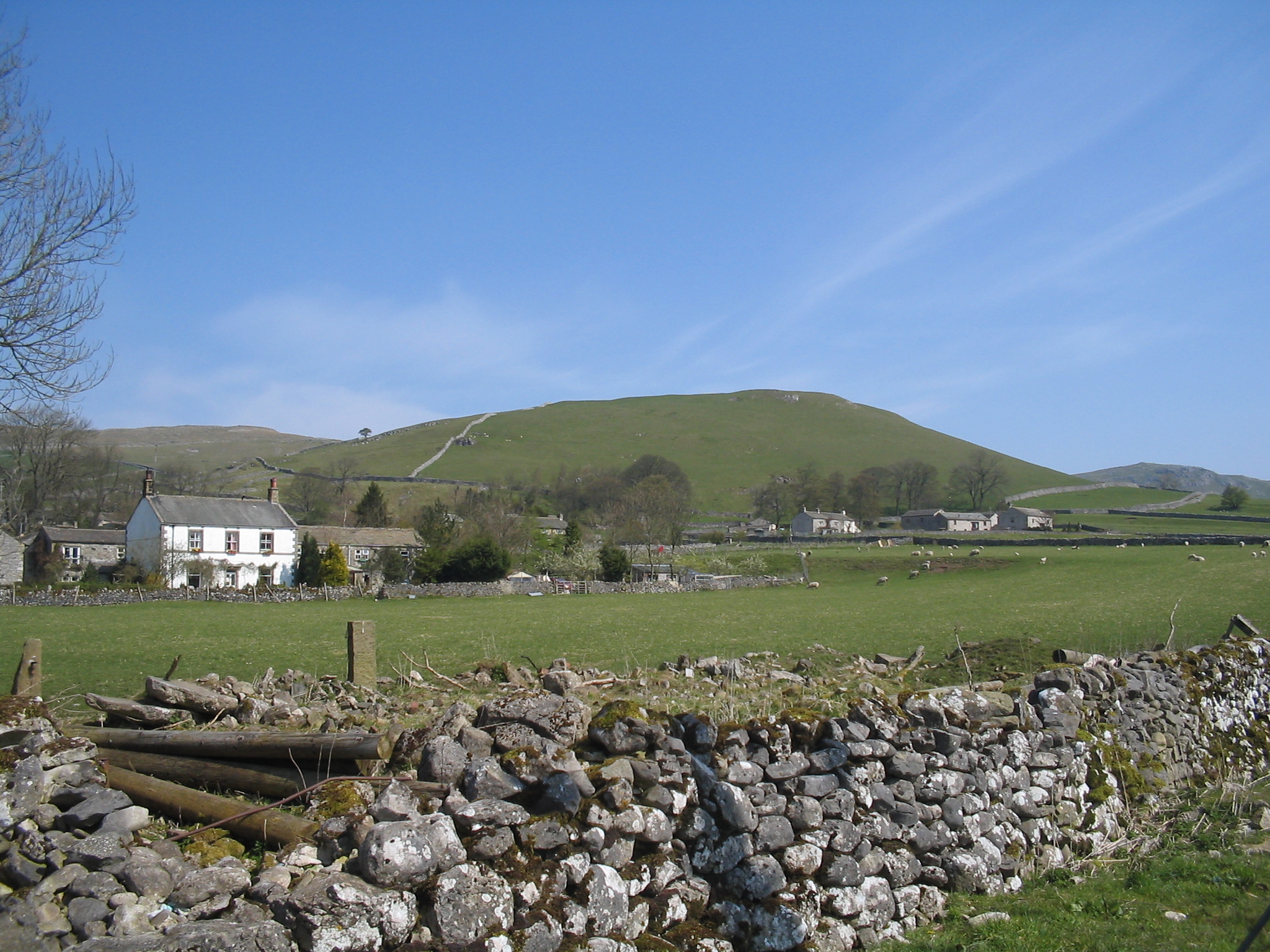
Malham is surrounded by stone-walled pastures

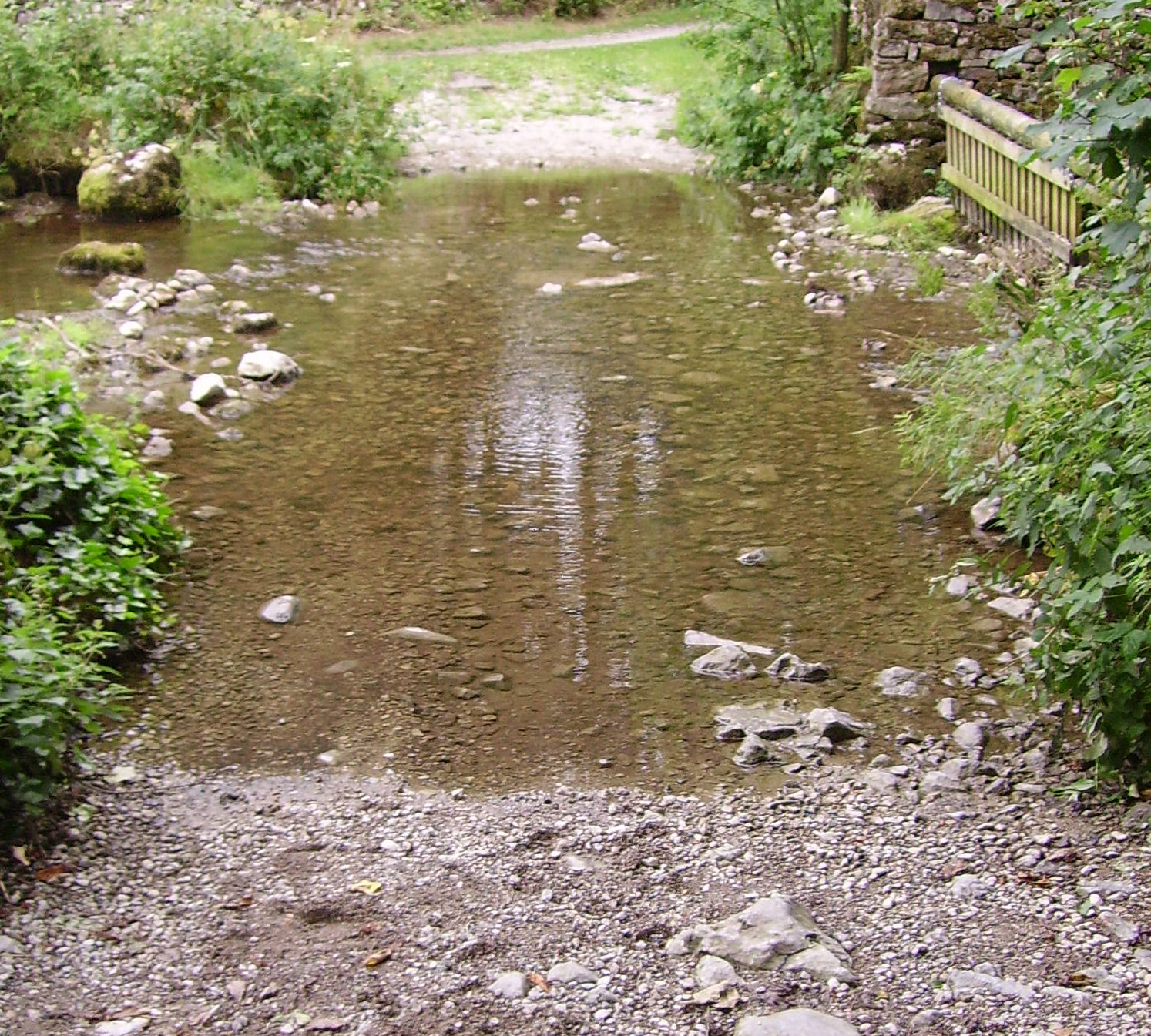
Ford

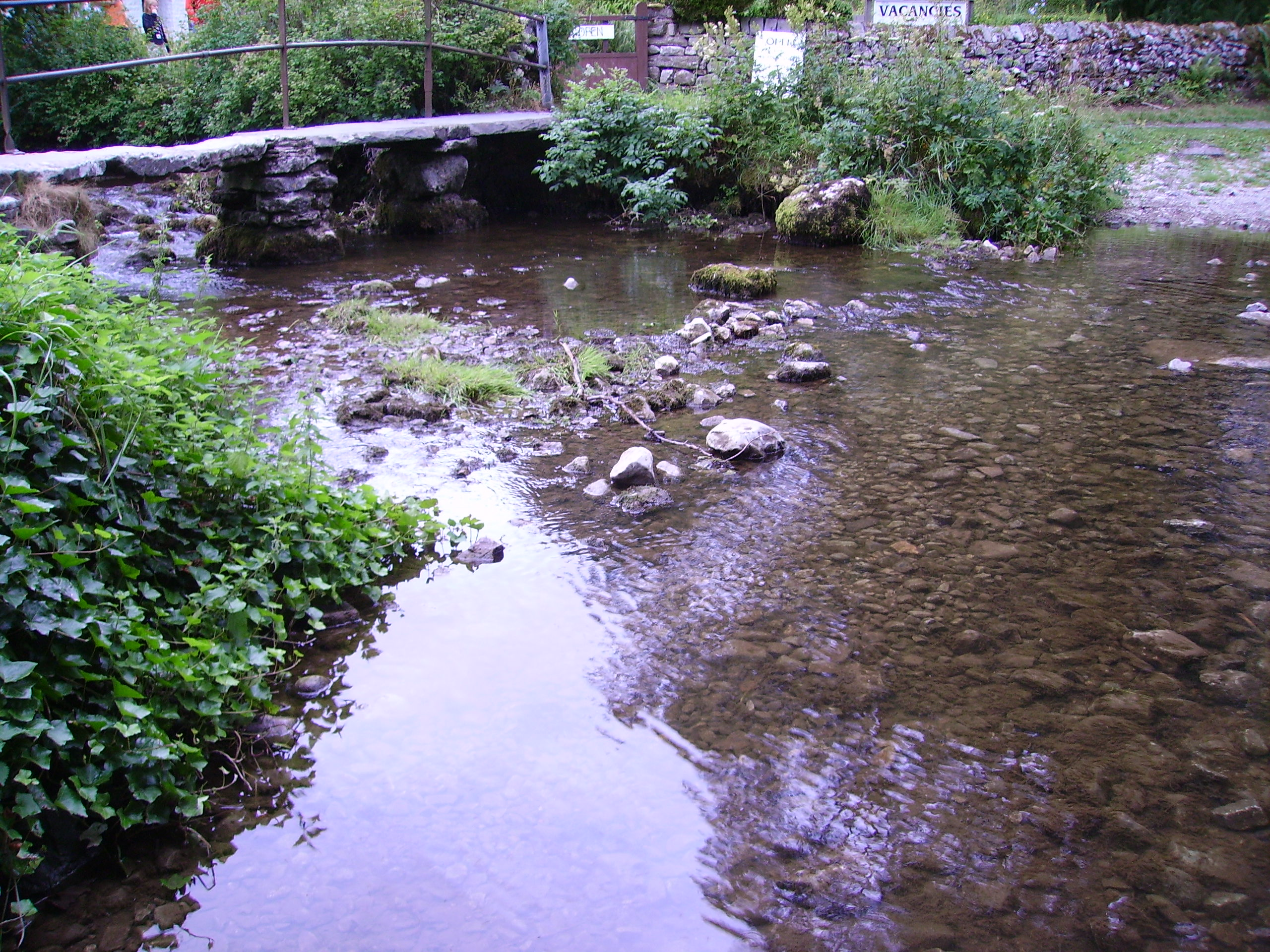
Small bridge

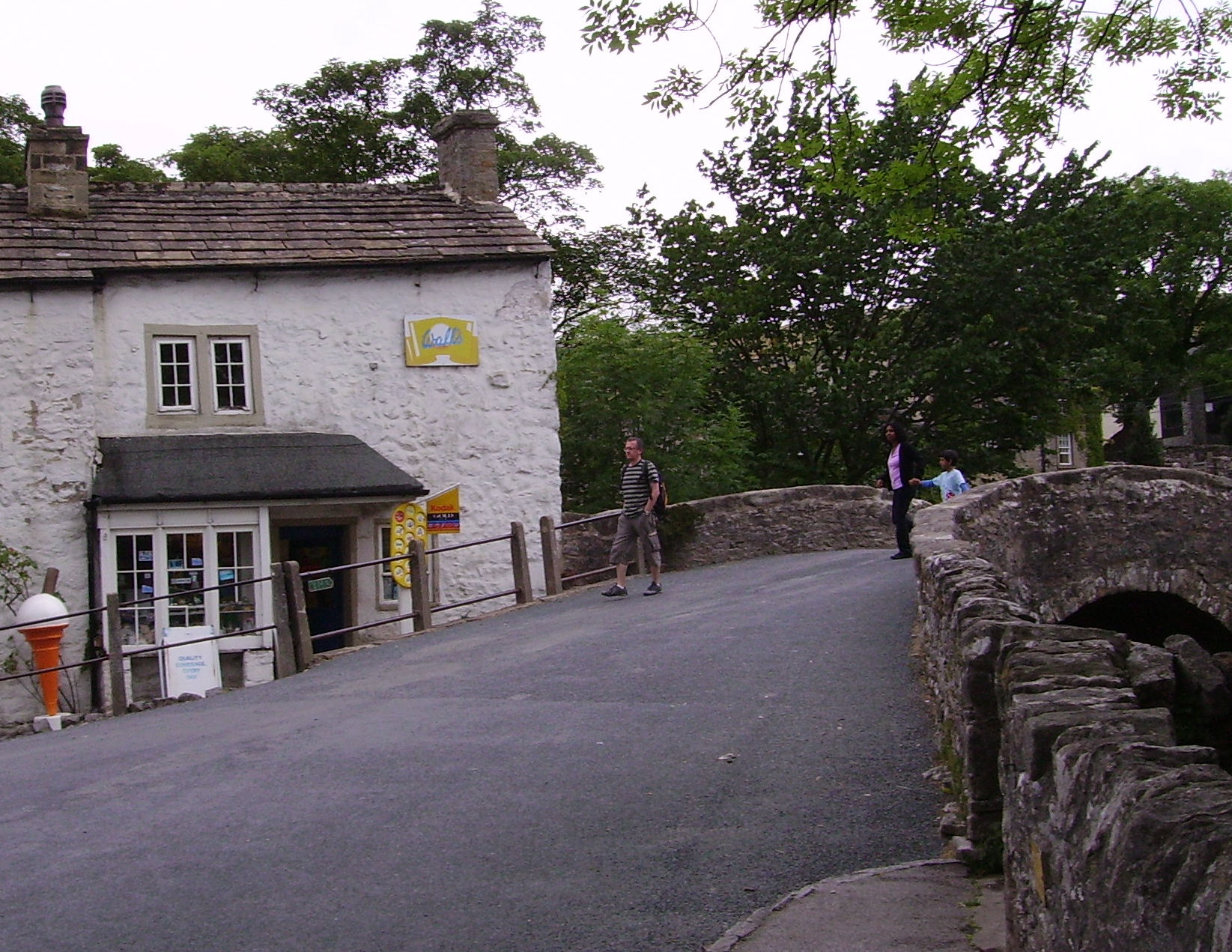
Sweet shop and Post Office

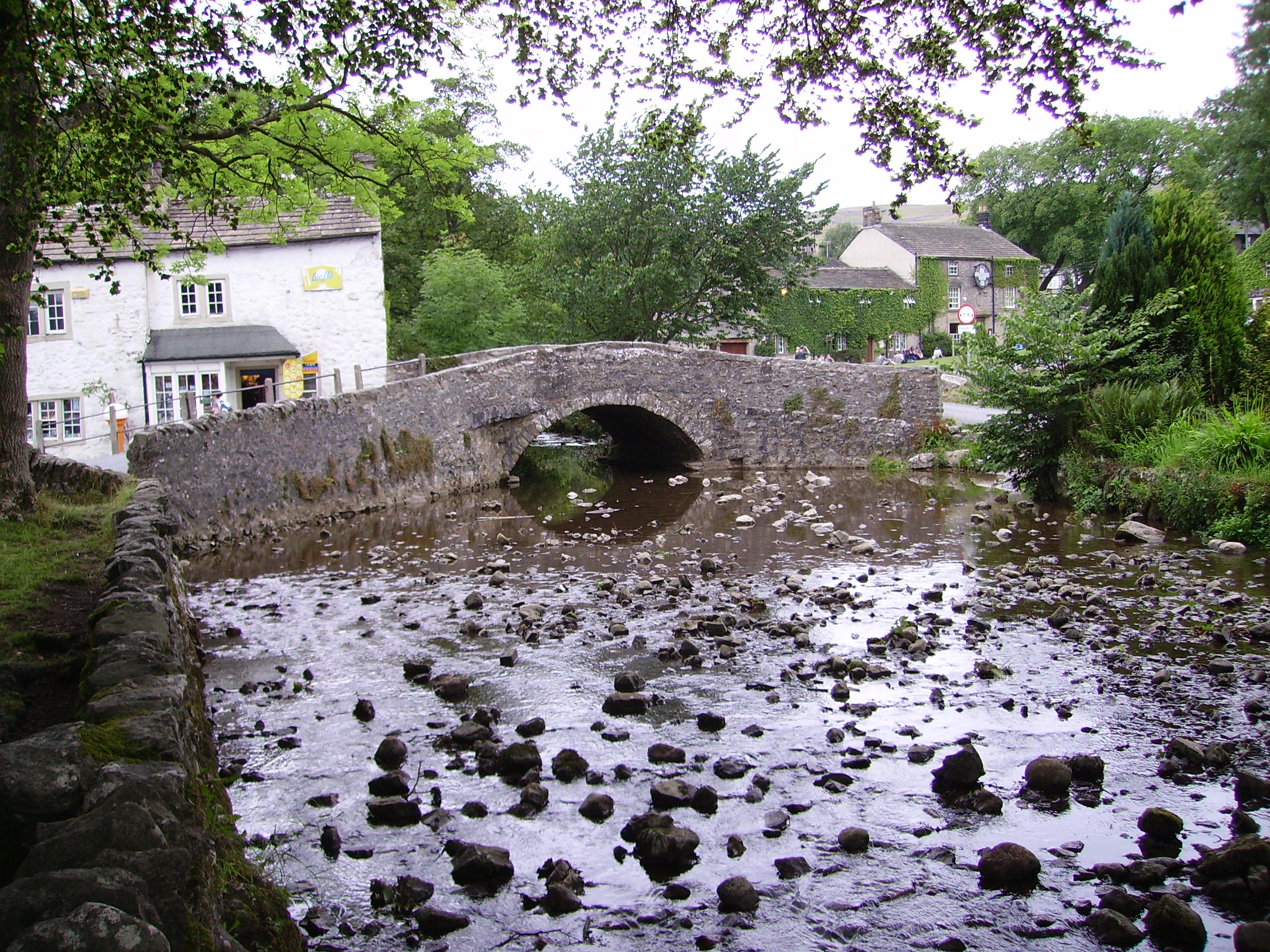
Malham Beck

== See also ==
- Listed buildings in Malham
- Malham Tarn Field Studies Centre
