= Malham Beck =

Stream in North Yorkshire, England

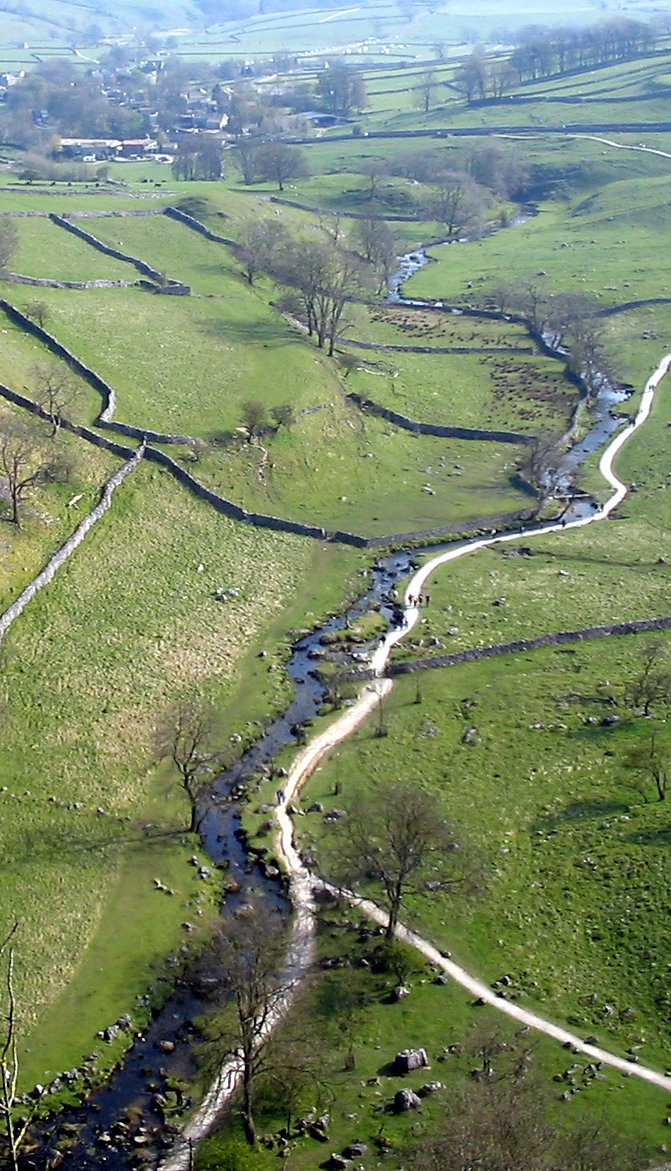
The stream seen from the top of Malham Cove

Malham Beck is a stream some 1.2 miles (2 km) long, running southwards through the valley beneath Malham Cove in the Yorkshire Dales, England. It originates in a cave beneath Malham Cove, and flows through Malham before joining Gordale Beck to become the River Aire just south of the village.
