= Janet's Foss =

Waterfall in North Yorkshire, England

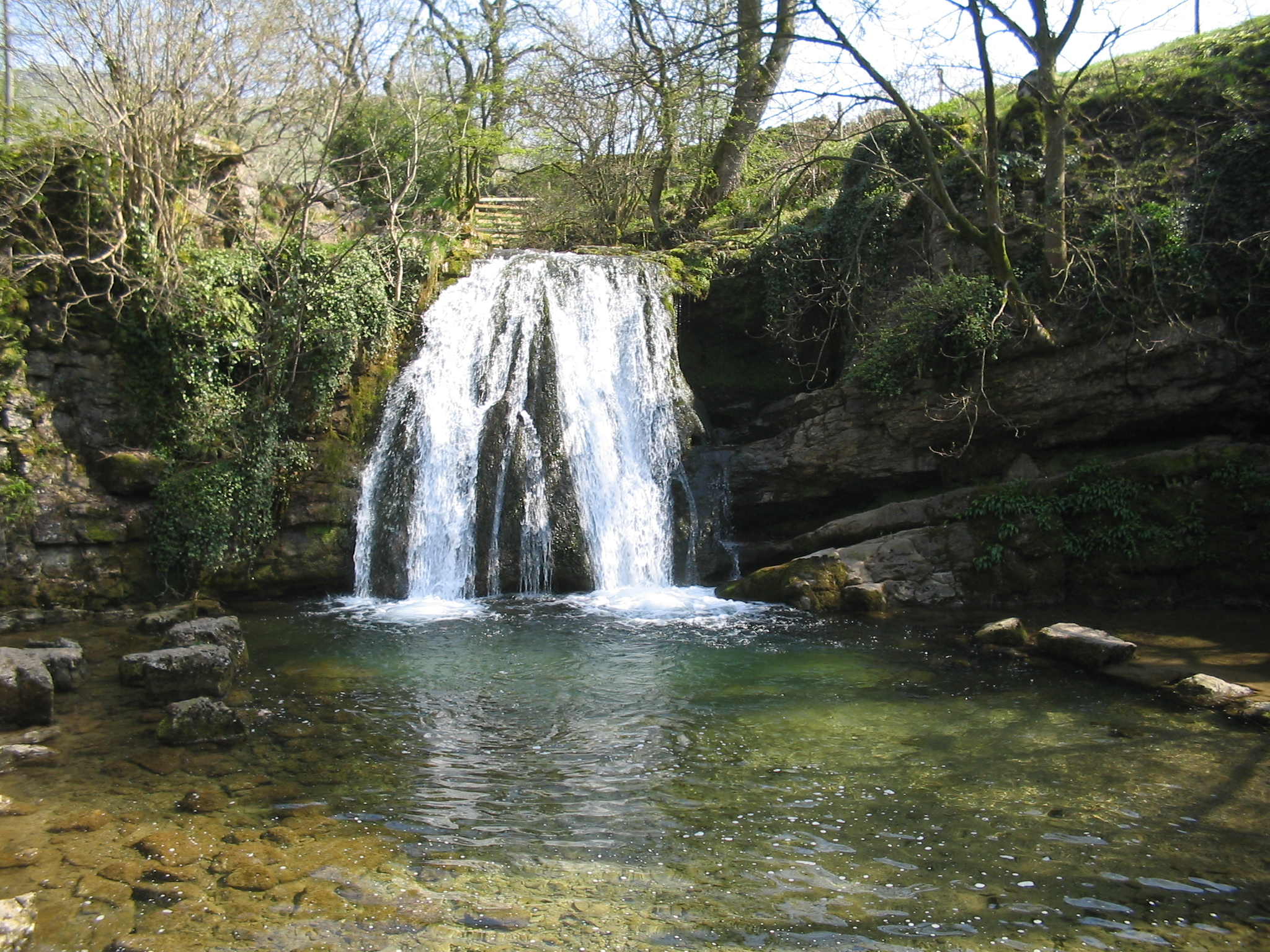
- Janet's Foss in April 2005
- Interactive map of Janet's Foss
- Location: North Yorkshire, England
- Coordinates: 54°3′58″N 2°8′12″W
- Type: Plunge
- Watercourse: Goredale Beck/River Aire

Janet's Foss is a small waterfall near the village of Malham, North Yorkshire, England. It carries Gordale Beck over a limestone outcrop topped by tufa into a deep pool below. The pool was traditionally used for sheep dipping, an event which drew in local village inhabitants for the social occasion.

The name Janet (sometimes Jennet) is believed to refer to a fairy queen reputed to inhabit a cave at the rear of the fall. Foss is a Nordic word for waterfall, still used in Scandinavia, and is presented in a number of cases in England as 'force'.

Janet's Foss was the location of the fictional Molkham Falls featured in the 2006 independent British film Waterfall. Filming took place there in May 2006.

Janet's Foss is occasionally used by all-weather wild swimmers.

== See also ==
- List of waterfalls
- List of waterfalls in England
