= Limestone pavement =

Natural karst landform consisting of a flat, incised surface of exposed limestone

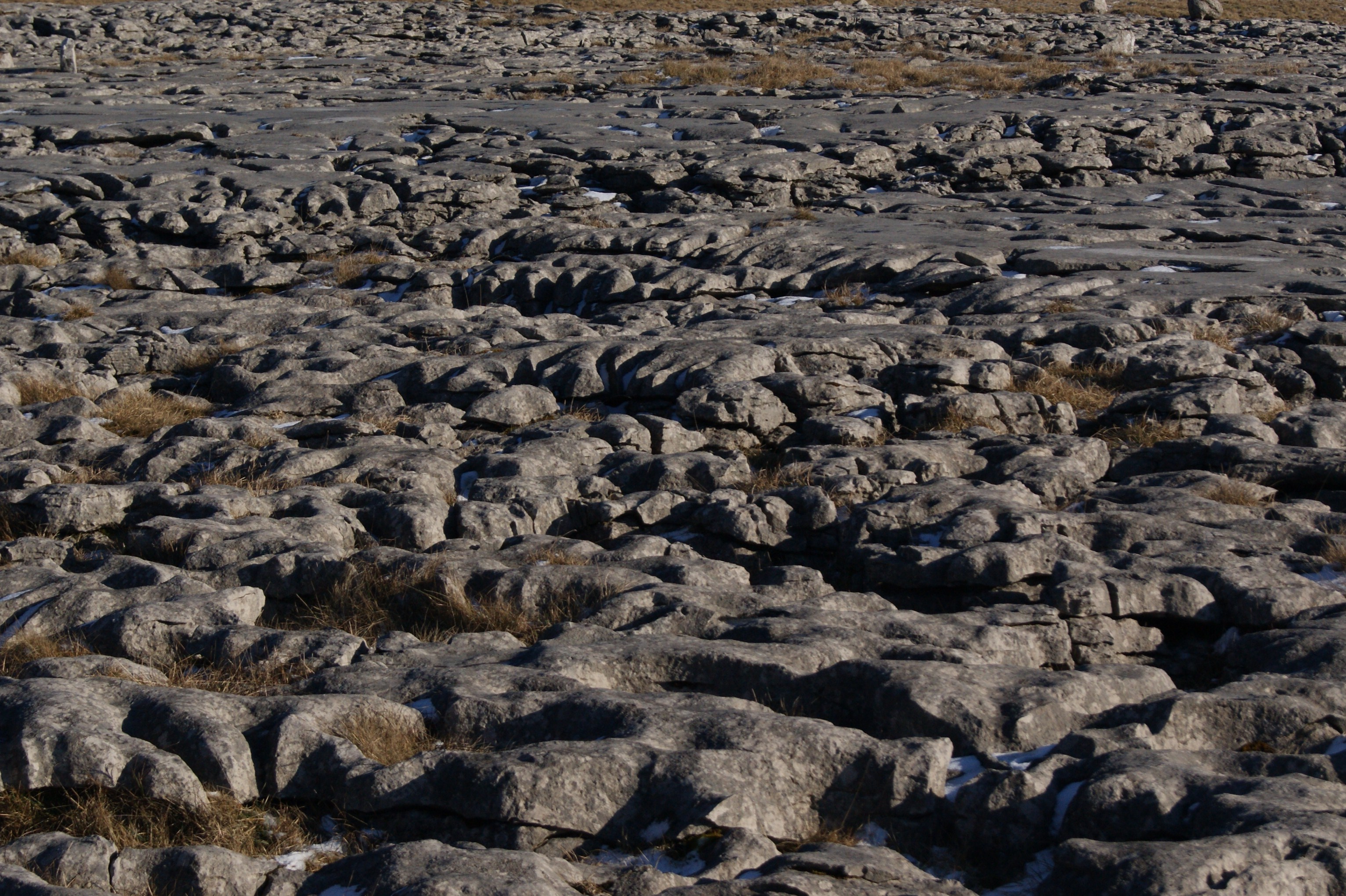
Detail of the large limestone pavement in the Yorkshire Dales between Ingleborough and Pen-y-ghent.

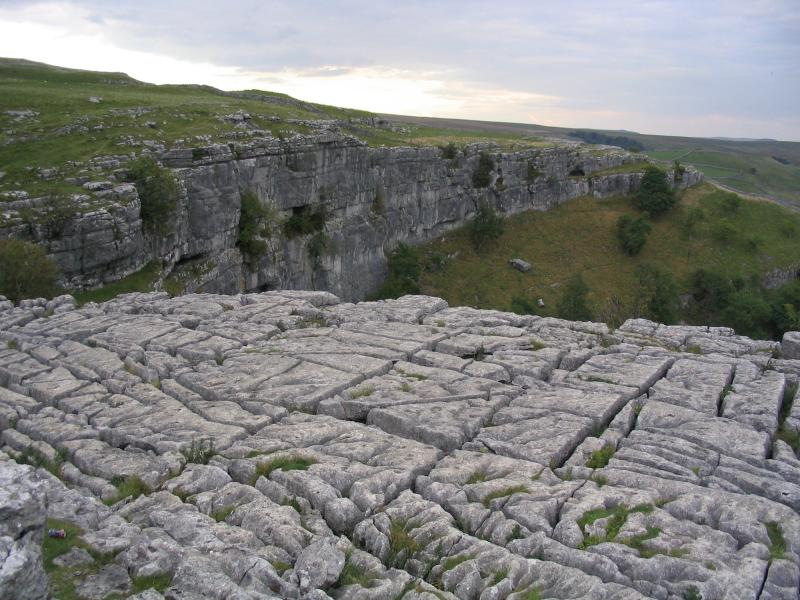
Limestone pavement above Malham Cove

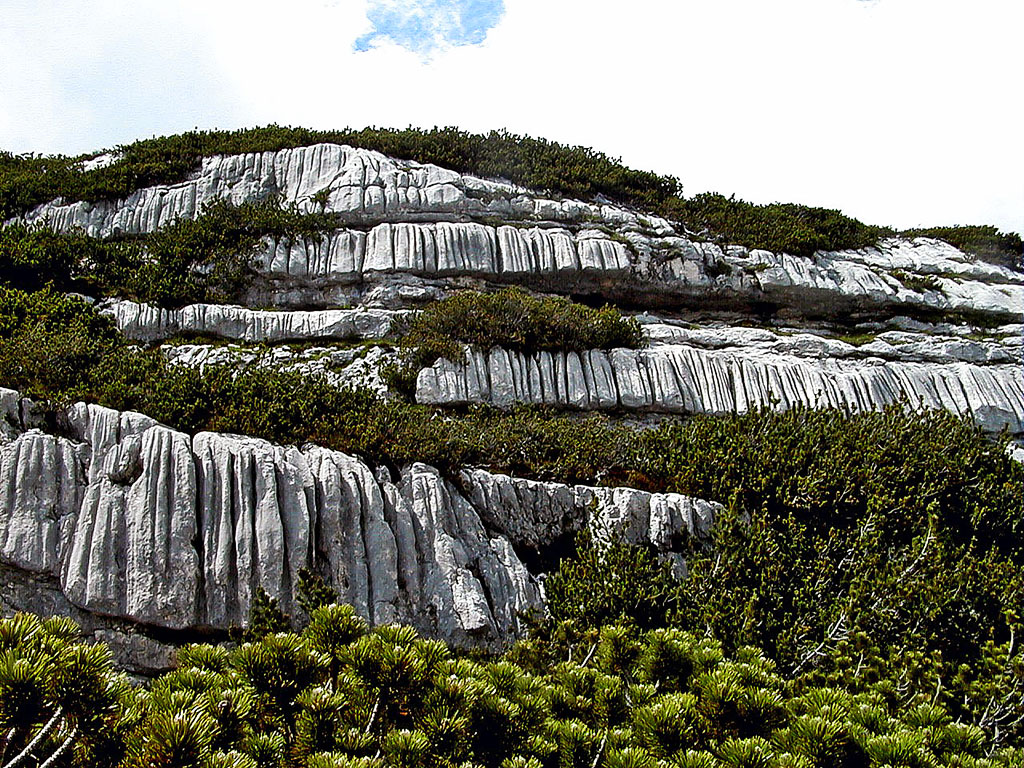
Limestone pavement on Zgornja Komna, Julian Alps

A limestone pavement is a natural karst landform consisting of a flat, incised surface of exposed limestone that resembles an artificial pavement. The term is mainly used in the UK and Ireland, where many of these landforms have developed distinctive surface patterning resembling paving blocks. Similar landforms in other parts of the world are known as alvars.

== Formation of a limestone pavement ==
Conditions for limestone pavements are created when an advancing glacier scrapes away overburden and exposes horizontally bedded limestone, with subsequent glacial retreat leaving behind a flat, bare surface. Limestone is slightly soluble in water and especially in acid rain, so corrosive drainage along joints and cracks in the limestone can produce slabs called clints isolated by deep fissures called grikes or grykes (terms derived from a northern English dialect). If the grykes are fairly straight and the clints are uniform in size, the resemblance to man-made paving stones is striking, but they are not necessarily so regular. Limestone pavements that develop beneath a mantle of topsoil usually exhibit more rounded forms.

== Notable examples ==
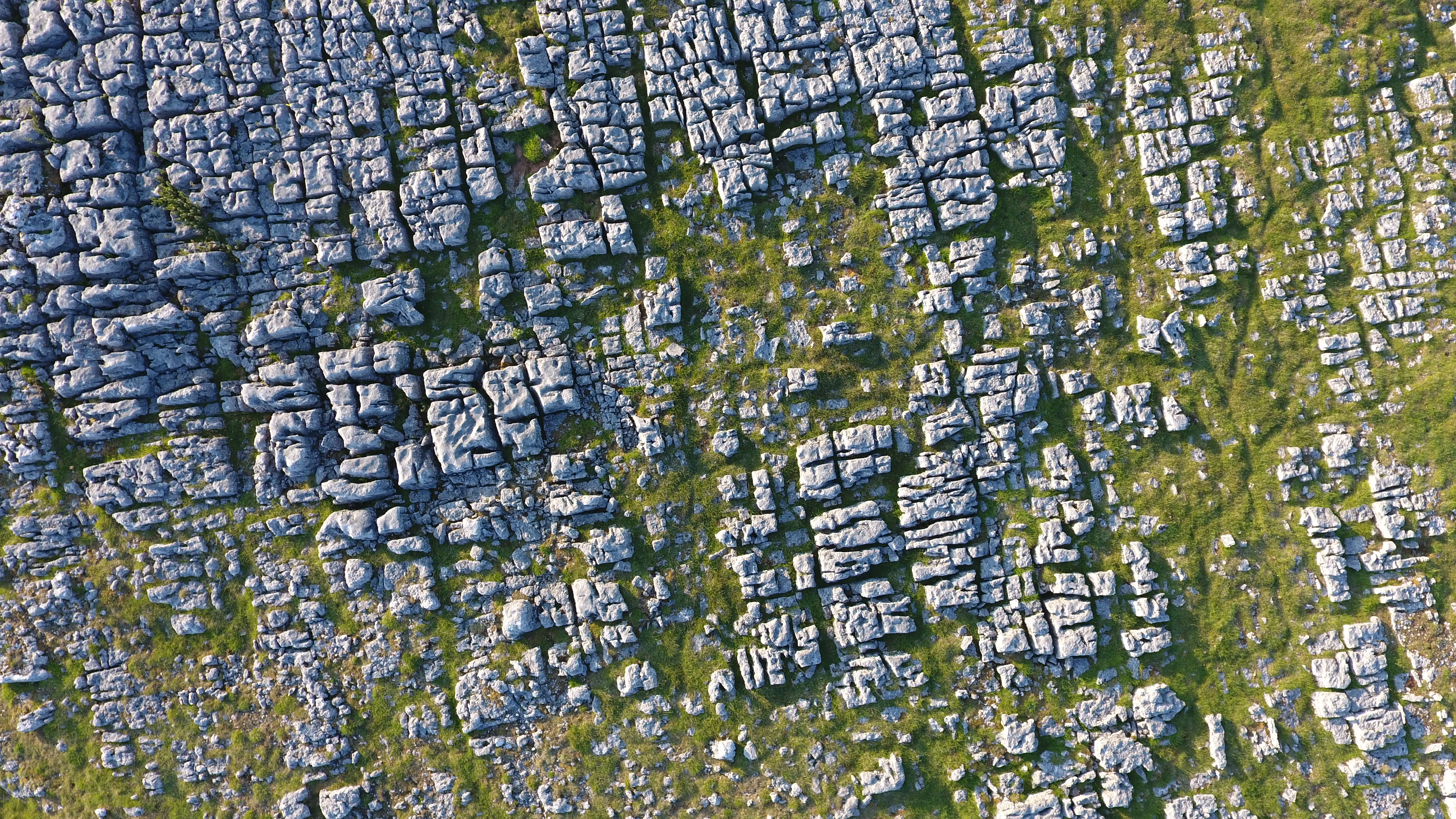
Limestone pavement on Orton Scar, Cumbria, England

Limestone pavements can be found in many previously glaciated limestone environments around the world. Notable examples are found in the Yorkshire Dales and Cumbria in Northern England, such as those above Malham Cove, on the side of Ingleborough, and above Grange-over-Sands. They are also found in the Stora Alvaret in Öland, Sweden; in the Burren, County Clare, Ireland, the Great Northern Peninsula on Newfoundland, and in the Désert de Platé, in the French Alps.

== See also ==
- Alvar – Limestone-based biological environment
- Calcareous glade – Type of ecological community found in the US
- Karst – Topography from dissolved soluble rocks
