= Eas Mòr =

Eas Mòr (Gaelic for "big waterfall") is the name of a number of waterfalls in Scotland:

- Eas Mòr, Arran
- Eas Mòr, Auchness
- Eas Mòr, Bernera
- Eas Mòr, Duirinish
- Eas Mòr, Glen Brittle
- Eas Mòr, Kames River
- Eas Mòr, Minginish
- Eas Mòr, Mull
- Eas Mòr burn, Puck's Glen, Cowal
- Eas Mòr, River Torridon
- Eas Mòr (lower)
- Eas Mòr (upper)
