= List of waterfalls in Scotland =

Much of Scotland is mountainous; western areas of the Highlands enjoy a wet climate. The more steeply plunging west coast highland rivers in particular are home to countless waterfalls. Scotland has over 150 waterfalls, most are situated in the Highlands due to the landscape

== Names of falls ==
The term ‘linn’ is found throughout southern and eastern Scotland (and in the northern English county of Northumberland). Confusingly 'linn' can denote either a fall or the plunge pool or indeed a confined stretch of water. ‘Spout’ is another common word found throughout England and Scotland for particular types of fall though it is usually replaced by ‘sput’ in the formerly Gaelic-speaking parts of the latter.

The Gaelic word ‘eas’ is by far the most common term for a waterfall in the Scottish Highlands where the majority of place names are of Gaelic origin.

== Highest waterfalls in Scotland ==
The list of highest waterfalls is sometimes debatable, due to the ambiguity of whether to measure the single largest fall or the sum of a series of falls, and many falls make false claims to the record. This table measures waterfalls by tallest single drop.

Waterfall	Location	Height (metres)
1	Eas a' Chual Aluinn	200
2	Steall waterfall	120
3	Falls of Glomach	113

== Alphabetical tables of named waterfalls ==
=== A ===
Waterfall name	River or stream	OS Grid ref.	General location
Achness Falls	River Cassley	NC468029	near Invercassley
Allalith Linn	Allalith Burn	NJ403589	near Fochabers
Steall Waterfall	Allt Coire a’ Mhail	NN180682	Glen Nevis
Auchinlinnylinn Spout	River Carron	NS755843	near Denny
Avich Falls	River Avich	NM965140	west of Loch Awe

=== B ===
Waterfall name	River or stream	OS Grid ref.	General location
Badger Fall	River Affric	NH299286	Glen Affric
Bearreraig Waterfall	Bearreraig River	NG515524	Trotternish, Skye
Bells Linn	Bells Burn	NY612948	near Kielder (on English border)
Black Linn Falls	River Braan		near Dunkeld
Black Linn of Blairvaich	Duchray Water	NS452997	near Aberfoyle
Black Spout	tributary of Cooper's Burn	NS610863	near Fintry
Black Spout	Finglen Burn	NS601797	near Lennoxtown
The Black Spout	Edradour Burn	NN953577	near Pitlochry
Bonnington Linn	River Clyde	NS8855041550	New Lanark
Bracklinn Falls	Keltie Water	NN645085	near Callander
Buchan Waterfall	Buchan Burn	NX417807	Glen Trool
Buck Loup	Grey Mare's Tail Burn	NX490722	near Newton Stewart
Bucks Linn	Craigshinnie Burn	NX608797	near Dalry

=== C ===
Waterfall name	River or stream	OS Grid ref.	General location
Caldron Linn	Annet Burn, tributary of River Teith	NN700048	near Doune
Cauldron Linn (River Devon)	River Devon	NT004988	near Crook of Devon
Carsindarroch Steps	River Bladnoch	NX304707	Galloway
Chest of Dee	River Dee	NO013886	Glen Dee
Corra Linn	River Clyde	NS8855041550	New Lanark
Corrie Spout	Corrie Burn	NS675789	Kilsyth Hills
Corrimony Falls	River Enrick	NH373292	Glen Urquhart
Craigie Linn	Little Water of Fleet	NX583652	Galloway
Clugie Linn	Palnure Burn	NX487713	near Newton Stewart
Culachy Falls	Connachie Burn off River Tarff	NH376058	near Fort Augustus
Culligran Falls	River Farrar	NH378401	Glen Strathfarrar
Culnaskiach Falls	on tributary of Bruiach Burn	NH487361	near Beauly
Cushat Linn	Boghead Burn	NS639244	near Muirkirk

=== D ===
Waterfall name	River or stream	OS Grid ref.	General location
Deil’s Caldron	River Lednock	NN768236	near Comrie
Derrygown Linn	Derrygown Burn	NX623631	Gatehouse of Fleet
Dog Falls	Burn of Agie	NN372898	near to Glen Roy
Dog Falls, Glen Affric	River Affric	NH286283	Glen Affric
Downie's Loup	Gargunnock Burn	NS707931	near Gargunnock
Drunmore Linn	Baing Burn	NS401020	near Straiton
Dualt Spout	Dualt Burn	NS501842	near Dumgoyne
Dundaff Linn	River Clyde	NS881423	New Lanark

=== E ===
Waterfall name	River or stream	OS Grid ref.	General location
Eagle's Fall	Eas an Tuirc	NN226143	Glen Fyne
Eas a’ Bhradain	Allt Coire nam Bruadaran	NG533265	in Red Cuillin, Skye
Eas a’ Chait	Allt Eas a’ Chait	NH580305	east of Loch Ness
Eas a’ Chaorainn	unnamed stream	NM817109	near Kilmelford
Eas a’ Chaorainn	Abhainn Bheag	NG792039	Knoydart
Eas a’ Chathaidh	River Orchy	NN247330	Glen Orchy
Eas a’ Chobhainn Duibh	Wester Fearn Burn	NH609865	near Ardgay
Eas a’ Chrannaig or Glenashdale Falls	Allt Dhepin or Glenashdale Burn	NS02982500	near Whiting Bay, Isle of Arran
Eas a Chraosain	unnamed stream	NH198956	north of Loch Achall, Ullapool
Eas a’ Mhuillidh	Allt Coire Mhuillidh	NH280389	Glen Strathfarrar
Eas a' Chual Aluinn	on tributary of Abhainn a’ Loch Bhig	NC280277	south of Loch Glencoul
Eas Aboist	Allt Mios an Airigh	NG157517	Duirinish, Skye
Eas Allt a’ Chaise	Allt a’ Chaise	NG865730	west of Loch Maree
Eas Allt a’ Mheil	Allt a’ Mheil	NH042023	north of Loch Quoich
Eas Allt an Tairbh	Allt an Tairbh	NR543889	Jura
Eas Allt Horn	Allt Horn	NC315426	near Loch Stack
Eas an Aighe	Allt a’ Chuilinn	NC317401	near Loch Stack
Eas an Dubhaidh	Fionn Lighe	NM959800	near Glenfinnan
Eas an Fhamhair	Lussa River	NR646875	Jura
Eas an Fhir Mhoir	River Etive	NN207512	Glen Etive
Eas an Fhithich	River Cannich	NH327322	Glen Cannich
Eas an Inbhire	Allt an Inbhire	NN027697	near Inverscaddle
Eas an Stocair	Allt an Lon Biolaireich	NM507447	Isle of Mull
Eas an Torre Mhoir	Abhainn Duibhe	NN461558	near Bridge of Gaur
Eas Bad a’ Chrotha	Abhainn Bad a’ Chrotha	NG782736	Badachro
Eas Bàn, Arran	on tributary of Machrie Water	NR942364	Arran
Eas Bàn, Bruichladdich	Bruichladdich	NR255612	Bruichladdich, Islay
Eas Bàn, Glen Elchaig (west)	Allt Mor	NG942279	Glen Elchaig
Eas Bàn, Glen Elchaig (east)	Allt Ban an Li-ruighe	NG983262	Glen Elchaig
Eas Bàn, Grey Corries	Allt Coire a’ Mhadaidh	NN239746	The Grey Corries
Eas Bàn, Kishorn	Russel Burn	NG815410	near Kishorn
Eas Bàn, Dundonnell	Allt Eighidh	NH096773	Dundonnell Forest
Eas Breac-achaidh	Abhainn Inbhir Ghuisierein	NG764042	Knoydart
Eas Buidhe	Allt na Leth Bheinn	NN062787	near Corpach
Eas Charron	Alladale River	NH459888	Glen Alladale
Eas Chia-aig	Abhainn Chia-aig	NN176889	east of Loch Arkaig
Eas Chlianaig	Allt Beinn Chlianaig	NN277799	near to Roybridge
Eas Choul	Allt a Chuaille	NH312832	Inverlael Forest
Eas Chuil	Allt Blarghour	NM998132	east of Loch Awe
Eas Cnoc na Morrar	Allt a’ Ghlinne Mhoir	NH401860	Glencalvie Forest
Eas Coire nan Choire	Allt Coire nan Cnamh	NG975045	near Kinlochhourn
Eas Creag an Luchda	Abhainn a’ Ghlinne Duibhe	NC311330	near Loch Glendhu
Eas Dhomhnuill Dhuibh	Allt Eas Dhomhnuill Duibh	NH096777	Dundonnell Forest
Eas Druim Dubh Thollaidh	River Shiel	NH002133	Glen Shiel
Eas Dubh, River Lonan	on tributary of River Lonan	NM942281	near Oban
Eas Dubh, Menteith Hills	unnamed tributary of Cos Burn	NN552033	south of Loch Venachar
Eas Dubh, Mull	Allt an Fhir	NM445194	Brolass, Isle of Mull
Eas Dubh, Glenaffric	Allt Coulavie	NH117238	Glenaffric
Eas Dubh, Glen Urquhart	Allt Luirg nam Broc	NH468286	Glen Urquhart
Eas Dubh, Ullapool	Ullapool River	NH151955	near Ullapool
Eas Dubh Uidh a’ Chlaigeil	Abhainn Mhor	NC210122	near Elphin
Eas Dubh a’Ghlinne Ghairbh	Inverianvie River	NG959887	Inchgavre Forest
Eas Dubh Gleann Tanagaidh	Abhainn Gleann Tanagaidh	NH085665	Fannichs
Eas Fionn	River Lael	NH232835	Inverlael Forest
Eas Fors	Ardow Burn	NM423497	near Dervaig, Isle of Mull
Eas Forsa	below Loch Allan	NR429676	Islay
Eas Geal	Benlister Burn	NR990310	near Lamlash, Arran
Eas Gluta	Glutt Water	NC987341	Flow Country
Eas Lathan	Doodilmore River	NR343748	Islay
Eas Maol Mhairi	River Cannich	NH319323	Glen Cannich
Eas Mhic Gorraidh	Allt Easan Mhic Gorraidh	NG844225	near Glenelg
Eas Mòr, Arran	Allt Mor	NS019223	near Auchenhew, (Arran)
Eas Mòr (lower)	Abhainn Ghil	NR275436	Islay
Eas Mòr (upper)	Abhainn Ghil	NR288433	Islay
Eas Mòr, Glen Brittle	Allt Coire na Banachdich	NG409214	Glen Brittle, Skye
Eas Mòr, Kames River	Kames River	NM982103	east of Loch Awe
Eas Mòr, Minginish	Huisgill Burn	NG325311	Minginish, Skye
Eas Mòr, Mull	Abhainn an Easa’ Mhoir	NM466230	Brolass, isle of Mull
Eas Mòr, Bernera	Abhainn Eilg	NG814217	near Glenelg
Eas Mòr, Auchness	Burn of Auchness	NJ105483	Glen Lossie
Eas Mòr, Durinish	Dibidal River	NG211413	Duirinish, Skye
Eas Mòr, River Torridon	River Torridon	NG929561	Glen Torridon
Eas na Baintighearna	Allt Pollain Riabhaich	NH238929	Glen Achall
Eas na Bo Raibhaich	unnamed tributary of River Aray	NN084125	near Inveraray
Eas na Braiste	Feith an Leothaid	NC210198	south of Loch Assynt
Eas na Ciste	Allt na Caillich	NG976440	Strathcarron
Eas na Dabhaich	unnamed stream	NM540219	near Carsaig, Isle of Mull
Eas na Gaibhre	River Kerry	NG838720	near Gairloch
Eas na Muic	unnamed stream	NM877329	near Dunbeg, Oban
Eas na Saighe Caime	Allt Poll an Droighim	NC264221	Inchnadamph Forest
Eas na Speireig	Allt Eas na Speirieg	NH087703	Fannichs
Eas nam Beatach	Allt Coralan	NN350348	near Tyndrum
Eas nan Clag	River Nant	NN012265	near Taynuilt
Eas nan Coireachan	unnamed tributary of Glengarrisdale River	NR644953	Jura
Eas na Glutachan	Allt Leacach	NC279549	near Rhiconich
Eas nan Liathanach	Allt nan Liathanach	NM809688	Sunart
Eas nan Long	River Lochy	NN135790	near Fort William
Eas nan Lub	Allt Strath a’ Ghlinne	NN679170	Glen Artney
Eas of Auchness	Burn of Auchness	NJ115489	Glen Lossie
Eas Ruigh an t-Sagairt	Allt na Glaic Moire	NC085665	Inchnadamph Forest
Eas Tardil	Allt Achaidh Bhig	NG311571	Waternish, Skye
Eas Torran a’ Chompanaich	Allt Coire Sheilich	NH510895	Strathcarron
Eas Uisge Toll a' Mhadaidh	Inverianvie River	NG965873	Inchgarve Forest
Eas Urchaidh	River Orchy	NN243321	Glen Orchy
Easa Cumhang	Levencorroch Burn	NS011219	near Auchenhew, Arran
Easan Ban	Allt an Eoin	NH252105	Glen Moriston
Easan Bana, Gairloch	Abhainn Ghlas	NG828749	near Gairloch
Easan Bana, Kishorn	Allt Loch Gaineamhach	NG836442	near Kishorn
Easan Bhunachain	River Roy	NN322900	Glen Roy
Easan Buidhe	Abhainn Inbhir Ghuiserein	NG788035	Knoydart
Easan Choineas	Glen Golly River	NC409446	Glen Golly
Easan Dubh, Knapdale	Allt Cam a’ Phuirt	NR741805	Knapdale
Easan Dubh, Loch Treig	Allt na Lairige	NN307695	near Loch Treig
Easan Dubh	Allt Easain Duibh	NH387912	east of Freevater Forest
Easan Dubha	River Orchy	NN266356	Glen Orchy
Easan Garbh	Allt an Easain Ghairbh	NC268528	near Rhiconich
Easan Labhar	Allt an Easain Labhair	NM531419	near Salen, Isle of Mull
Easan Laogh,	Allt Coire Laogh	NN078503	Glen Creran
Easan Mor	Allt Coire Easain Mor	NN317715	west of Loch Treig
Easan na Gaibhre	River Cassley	NC395135	Glen Cassley
Easan nan Son	Gruinard River	NG975890	Inchgarve Forest
Easan nan Toll Dubha	Alladale River	NH445894	Glen Alladale
Easann Dhonnchaidh	unnamed stream	NG788117	near Arnisdale
Enarg Falls	River Einig	NH381999	near Oykel Bridge
Enoch Linn	Dunwan Burn	NS579498	near Eaglesham
Ess of Glenlatterach	Leanoch Burn	NJ194534	near Elgin
Euchan Fall	Euchan Water	NS772088	near Sanquhar

=== F ===
Waterfall name	River or stream	OS Grid ref.	General location
Fairy Loup	Byre Burn	NY395782	near Canonbie
Falls of Acharn	Acharn Burn	NN757432	near Kenmore
Falls of Balgy	River Balgy	NG849538	south of Upper Loch Torridon
Falls of Balnaguard	Balnaguard Burn	NN939510	near Grandtully
Falls of Barvick	Barvick Burn	NN850245	near Crieff
Falls of Bruar	Bruar Water	NN820666	Glen Garry
Falls of Camserney	Camserney Burn	NN815498	near Aberfeldy
Falls of Clyde (waterfalls)	River Clyde	NS882413	near Lanark
Falls of Cruachan	Allt Cruachan	NN079269	Pass of Brander
Falls of Damff	Water of Unich	NO385791	Glen Lee
Falls of Dee	Allt a Gharbh-choire (River Dee)	NN943911	southwest of Braeriach
Falls of Dess	Dess Burn	NJ566004	near Aboyne
Falls of Divach	Divach Burn	NH494274	near Drumnadrochit
Falls of Dochart	River Dochart	NN571323	at Killin
Falls of Drumly Harry	Nora Water	NO452624	Glen Ogil
Falls of Edinample	Burn of Ample	NN602224	near Lochearnhead
Falls of Falloch	River Falloch	NN338208	Glen Falloch
Falls of Feakirk	River Divie	NJ037447	south of Forres
Falls of Fender	Fender Burn	NN878667	near Blair Atholl
Falls of Foyers (upper and lower sections)	River Foyers	NH498203	Foyers
Falls of Glomach	Abhainn Gaorsaic	NH018257	Glen Elchaig
Falls of Keltney	Keltney Burn	NN772496	Appin of Dull
Falls of Kirkaig	River Kirkaig	NC112178	near Inverkirkaig
Falls of Leny	Garbh Uisge	NN592087	near Callander
Falls of Lochay	River Lochay	NN543351	near Killin
Falls of Measach	Abhainn Droma	NH203778	near Ullapool
Falls of Moness	Moness Burn	NN852473	near Aberfeldy
Falls of Monzie	Shaggie Burn	NN884263	near Crieff
Falls of Ness	Machany Water	NN884157	near Muthill
Falls of Orrin	River Orrin	NH468517	near Muir of Ord
Falls of Pattack	River Pattack	NN557883	east of Loch Laggan
Falls of Rogie or Rogie Falls	River Blackwater	NH444584	near Contin
Falls of Roy	River Roy	NN360922	Glen Roy
Falls of Tarf	Tarf Water	NN983797	Glen Tilt
Falls of the Braan	River Braan	NO003415	near Dunkeld
Falls of the Glasallt	Glas Allt	NO270830	Glen Muick
Falls of Turret	Turret Burn	NN839243	near Crieff
Falls of Unich	Water of Unich	NO386802	Glen Lee
Foot Loup	Grey Mare's Tail Burn	NX490723	near Newton Stewart
Forsan, Shetland	Burn of Mail	HU407291	Cunningsburgh, Shetland

=== G ===
Waterfall name	River or stream	OS Grid ref.	General location
Garnock Spout or Spout of Garnock	River Garnock	NS287608	near Lochwinnoch
Garpel Linn	Whitehaugh Water	NS619276	near Muirkirk
Gillwham	Kinharvie Burn	NX928653	near New Abbey
Glenashdale Falls or Eas a’ Chrannaig	Glenashdale Burn or Allt Dhepin	NR029250	near Whiting Bay, Isle of Arran
Glencoe Waterfall	Allt Lairig Eidle into Coe	NN183562	A82 west of Altnafeadh
Goat Linn	Cauldwell Sike	NY455888	near Newcastleton
Gotter Linn	Gotter Water	NS345661	near Kilmacolm
Grey Mare's Tail, Moffat Hills	Tail Burn	NT183149	near Moffat
Grey Mare's Tail, Galloway	Grey Mare's Tail Burn	NX491726	near Newton Stewart
Grey Mare's Tail, Kinlochmore	Allt Coire na Ba	NN187625	Kinlochmore
Greymare's Tail, Kirkconnel	Churn Burn	NS727153	near Kirkconnel
Grey Mare's Tail, Monreith	unnamed stream	NX374390	near Monreith
Grey Mare's Tail, Kilpatrick Hills	Jaw Burn	NS500752	near Duntocher
Guisachan Fall	Allt na Sidhean	NH290249	near Tomich

=== H, I, J, K ===
Waterfall name	River or stream	OS Grid ref.	General location
Hespies Linn	Penkiln Burn	NX451724	near Newton Stewart
Hilly Linn	Shaw Burn	NT662097	near Chesters
Hog Gill Spout	Hog Gill	NY462892	near Newcastleton
Inverlair Falls	River Spean	NN339807	Glen Spean
Inversnaid Falls	Arklet Water	NN337087	east of Loch Lomond
Ishneich	Gallangad Burn	NS453815	near Alexandria
Kettle Caldron	Auchmantle Burn	NX167627	near New Luce
Kidd's Linn	Staneshiel Burn	NY544914	in Liddesdale
Kilfinnan Fall	Kilfinnan Burn	NN271967	north of Loch Lochy

=== L ===
Waterfall name	River or stream	OS Grid ref.	General location
Lady's Linn	Penkiln Burn	NX447699	near Newton Stewart
Laggan Linn	White Laggan Burn	NX467770	near Newton Stewart
The Linn, Rothes	Burn of Garbity	NJ308521	near Rothes
The Linn, Ochils	Back Burn	NO037090	Ochil Hills
The Linn, River Lossie	River Lossie	NJ117457	Glen Lossie
Linn of Avon	River Avon	NJ175073	Glen Avon
Linn of Barhoise	River Bladnoch	NX338623	near Kirkcowan
Linn of Dee	River Dee	NO062897	near Inverey
Linn of Muick	River Muick	NO332895	Glen Muick
Linn of Quoich	Quoich Water	NO115913	near Braemar
Linn of Tanar	River Tanar	NO387890	Glen Tanar
Linn of Tummel	River Tummel	NN909599	near Pitlochry
Linne Chumhann	Innerhadden Burn	NN670568	near Kinloch Rannoch
Linnford	Glen Burn	NS209524	near Fairlie
Loup of Fintry	Endrick Water	NS662862	near Fintry
Loup of Kilfeddar	Main Water of Luce	NX152675	near New Luce
Loup of Penwhirn	Penwhirn Burn	NX130695	near New Luce
Loups of Barnshangan	Cross Water of Luce	NX193650	near New Luce
Loups of Dalnigap	Main Water of Luce	NX134708	near New Luce
Lynn Spout	Caaf Water	NS283484	near Dalry

=== M – R ===
Waterfall name	River or stream	OS Grid ref.	General location
Murnoch Spout	Murchan Burn	NS290609	near Lochwinnoch
Na h-Easain	Water of Nevis	NN203686	Glen Nevis
Ness Waterfall	Water of Coyle	NS411214	near Coylton
Oykel Falls	River Oykel	NC382012	near Oykel Bridge
Peggie’s Spout	Bin Burn	NS678821	Kilsyth Hills
Puck's Glen	Eas Mòr burn, off River Eachaig	NS147843	near Benmore Botanic Garden
Plodda Falls	Allt na Bodachan	NH277238	near Tomich
Reekie Linn	River Isla	NO253537	Glen Isla
Rogie Falls (or Falls of Rogie)	Black Water	NH444584	near Contin

=== S ===
Waterfall name	River or stream	OS Grid ref.	General location
Shepherd's Linn	Ballintomb Burn	NJ208428	Strathspey
Shin Falls	River Shin	NH576994	near Invershin
Spectacle E’e Falls	Kype Water	NS716433	near Strathaven
Spout of Achentallach	Spout Burn	NX666567	near Twynholm
Spout of Balbowie	Cammal Burn	NS643870	Fintry Hills
Spout of Ballaggan	Ballaggan Burn	NS572802	near Strathblane
Spout of Ballochleam	Boquhan Burn	NS652898	Gargunnock Hills
Spout of Garnock or Garnock Spout	River Garnock	NS287608	near Lochwinnoch
Spout Linn	Waterhead Burn	NY190948	near Eskdalemuir
Sput a’ Chleibh	Water of Ruchill	NN732178	Glen Artney
Sput Beag	Allt Mor	NN555135	near Loch Lubnaig
Sput Dubh, Loch Katrine	tributary stream to Loch Katrine	NN385140	north of Loch Katrine
Sput Dubh, Glen Ogle	Allt an Sput Dhuibh	NN584262	near Lochearnhead
Sput Dubh, Glen Ample	Allt a Choire Fhuadaraich	NN604194	near Lochearnhead
Sput Dubh, Loch Ard	tributary stream to Loch Ard	NN481024	near Aberfoyle
Sput Dubh, Brora	Allt na Cuile	NC940092	near Brora
Sput Leacach	on tributary of Brackland Burn	NN657088	near Callander
Sput Mor	Allt Mor	NN557136	near Loch Lubnaig
Sput Rolla	River Lednock	NN728284	Glen Lednock
Sputan Ban	Allt Coulavie	NH135227	Glen Affric
Steall Waterfall	Allt Coire a’ Mhail	NN180682	Glen Nevis
Steall Abhainn na Cloich	Abhainn na Cloich	NB536508	near Tolsta, Isle of Lewis
Steallair Eunaich	Eas Eunaich	NN140309	near Dalmally
Steallaire Ban	tributary of Allt Riabhachan	NN072091	near Inveraray
Stinchar Falls	River Stinchar	NX371963	Galloway
Stonebyres Falls	River Clyde	NS853440	near Lanark
Stuck Chapel Spout	Stuck Chapel Burn	NN783338	Glen Almond
The Stulan	The Stulan Burn	NO256824	Glen Muick
Suie Linn	Water of Minnoch	NX365857	Galloway
Swallow Craig	Black Devon	NT047947	near Saline

=== T – Z ===
Waterfall name	River or stream	OS Grid ref.	General location
Tairlaw Linn	Water of Girvan	NS408010	near Straiton
Tommore Linn	Ballintomb Burn	NJ209429	Strathspey
Torboll Fall	Abhainn an t-Sratha Charnaig	NH744985	near Rogart
Victoria Falls, Wester Ross	Abhainn Garbhaig	NG895711	south of Loch Maree
Waukers Linn	Polharrow Burn	NX585853	near Dalry
White Falls	River Roy	NN397933	Glen Roy
White Spout	Finglen Burn	NS599799	near Lennoxtown
Whitespout Linn	Whitespout Lane	NX453933	Galloway

== See also ==
- List of waterfalls
- List of waterfalls in the United Kingdom
