= Guisachan Fall =

Waterfall in the Scottish Highlands

Coordinates: 57.28262°N 4.83849°W

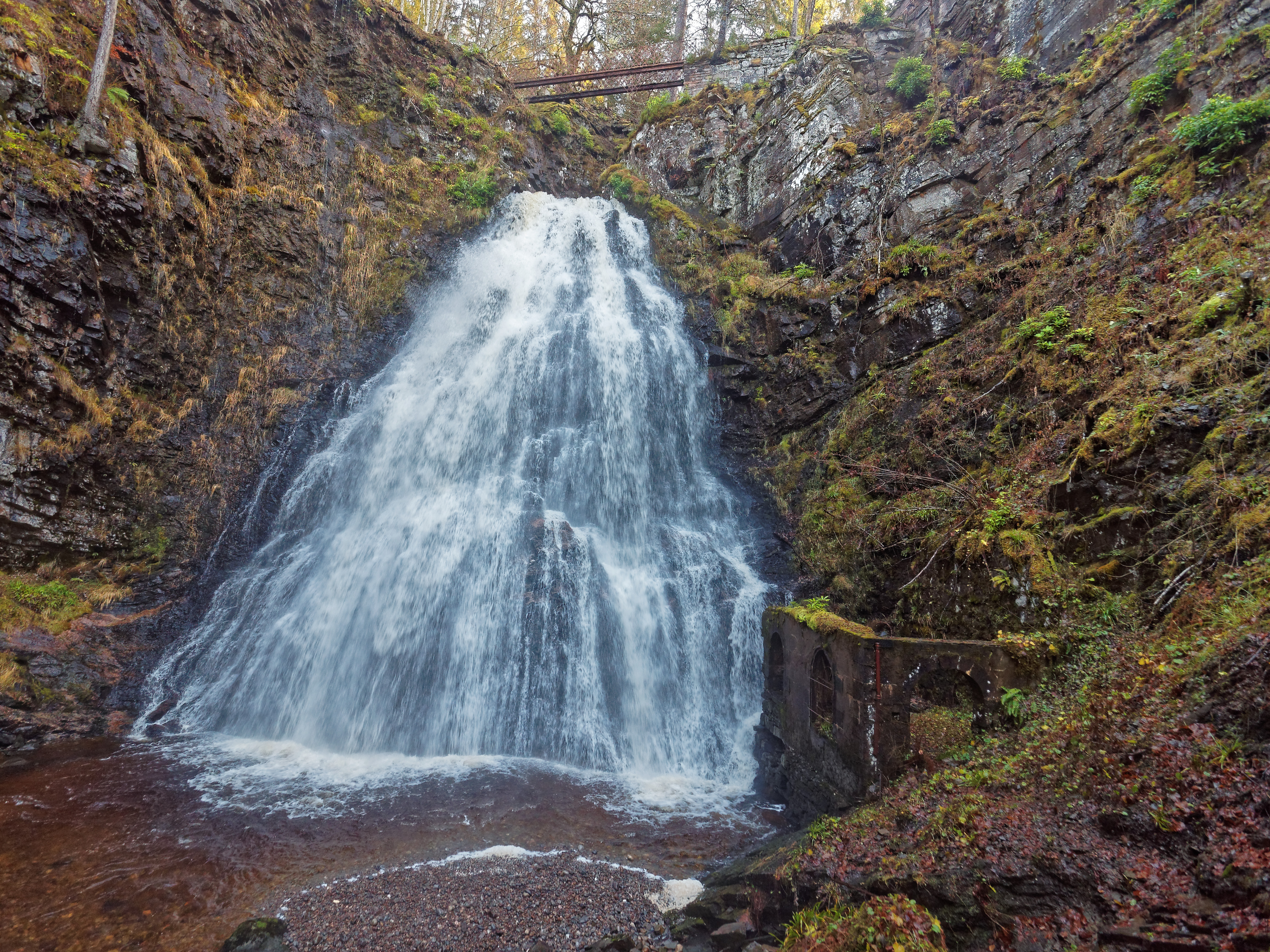
Guisachan Fall

Guisachan Fall is a waterfall in the Highlands of Scotland, south of Glen Affric. It is located in Srath Allt na Sìdean about 2.5 km (1.6 mi) south west of the village of Tomich, in The waterfall is formed by the Allt na Sìdean, a right-bank tributary of the Abhainn Deabhag, which in turn is a right-bank tributary of the River Affric. The waterfall is variously claimed to be about 80 to 90 feet (24 to 27 m) high, and is located at an altitude of about 130 m (430 ft) above sea level.

Known locally as Home Falls or Silver Falls, they are located near to the ruins of Guisachan House, approximately 25 chains (1,600 ft; 500 m) south east of Guisachan House. They can be accessed by a path which runs next to the Allt na Sidhean river. The remains of a hydro system which once powered the Guisichan House are found at the base of the falls, and the iron rings which once held the water pipe can still be seen in the rock face.

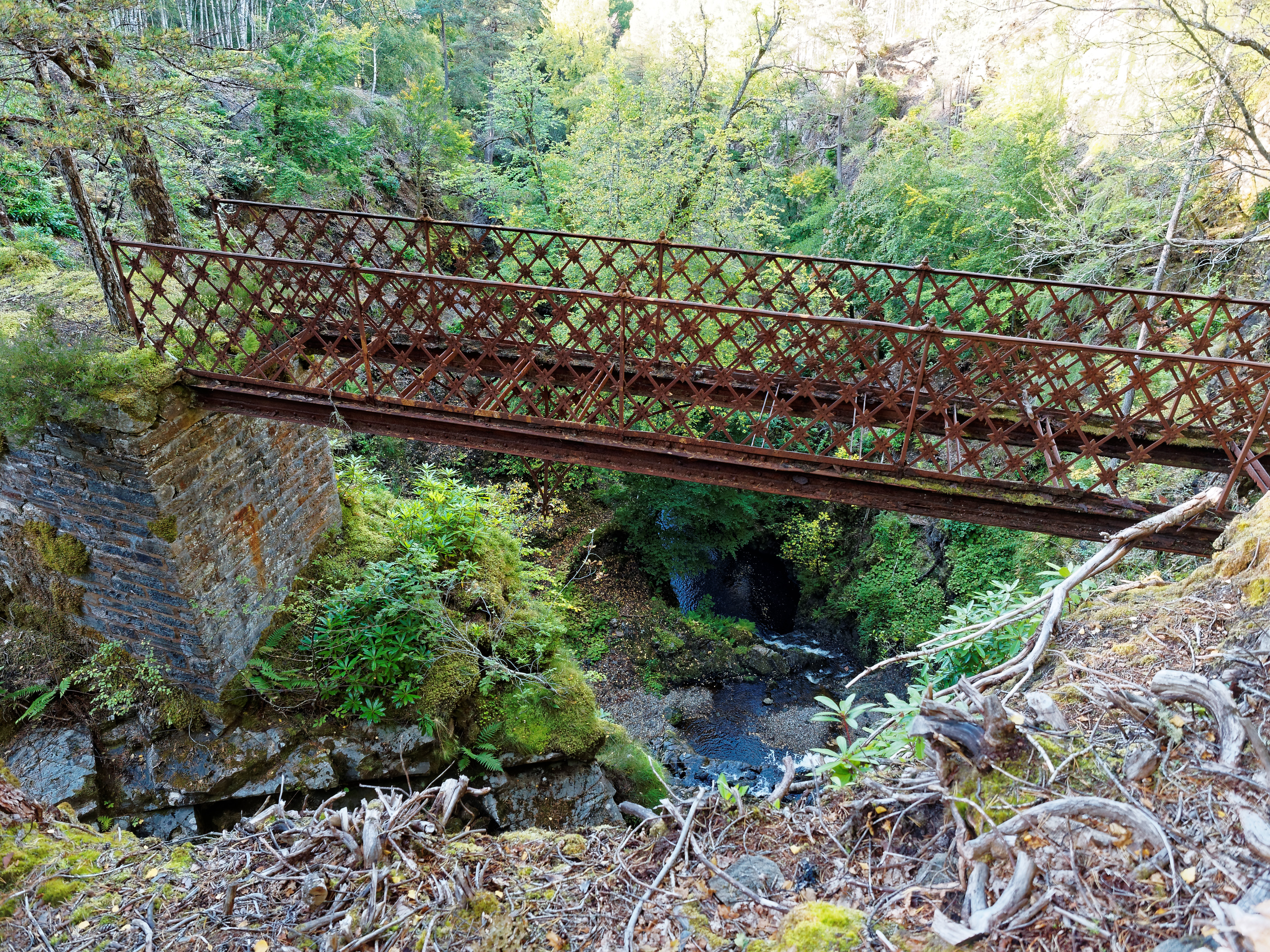
Derelict footbridge over the fall

Spanning the top of the falls are the remains of a wrought iron footbridge. This is very similar to the one which previously stood at the top of Plodda Falls, but more ornate. A sluice system which would have been used to divert water from Plodda can still be seen just behind the top of the falls.

During very cold spells, the waterfall can freeze over, and has been used as an ice climbing route. The north-facing Guisichan Fall reportedly freezes more readily than the nearby Plodda Falls.

In the 1860s, at nearby Guisachan House, the first Golden Retriever dogs were bred by Sir Dudley Marjoribanks.

== See also ==
- Waterfalls of Scotland
