= Linn of Muick =

Coordinates: 56.99183°N 3.10101°W

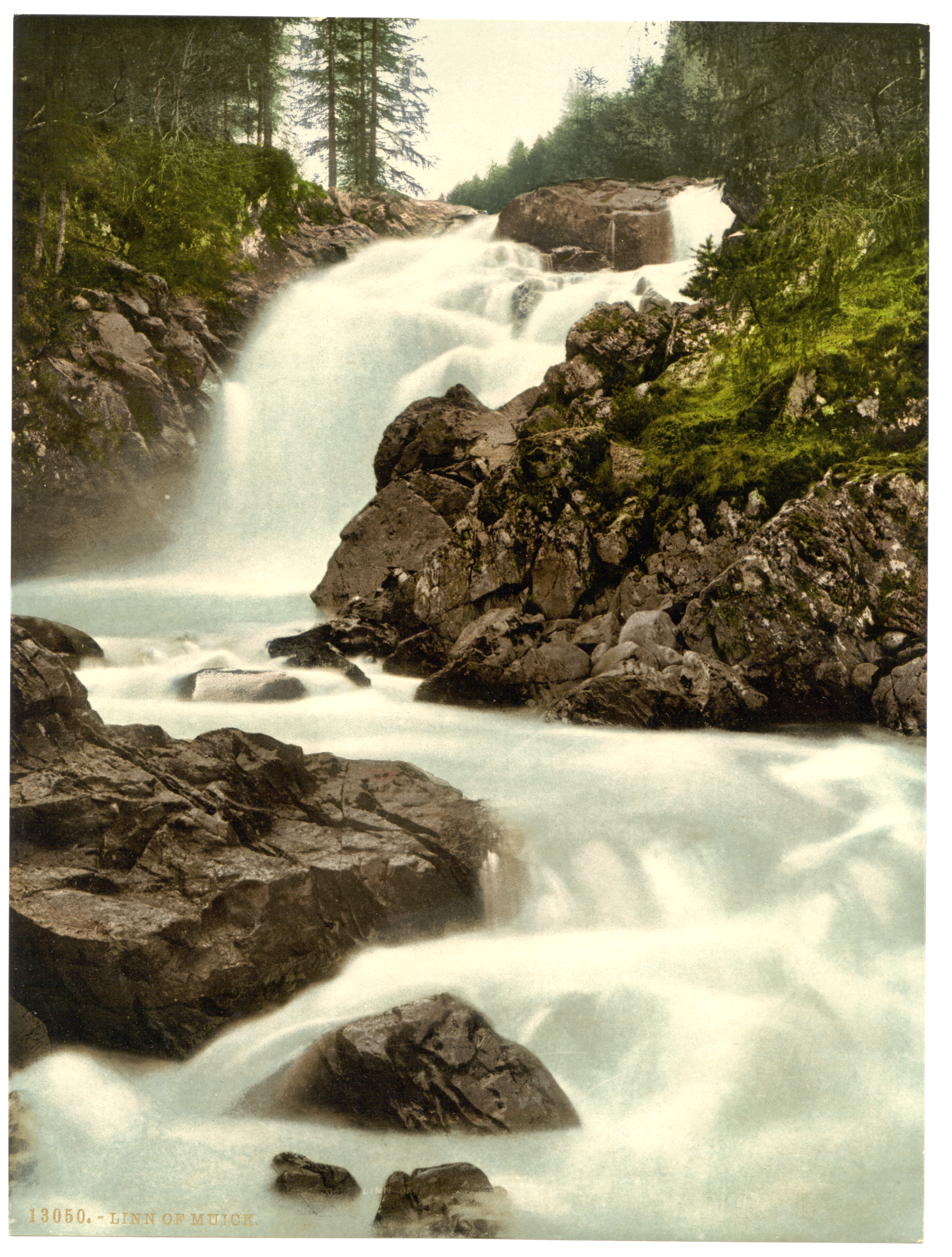
General view, Linn of Muick, Scotland in 19th century

Linn of Muick is a waterfall on the river Muick, Aberdeenshire, Scotland.

== See also ==
- Waterfalls of Scotland

Media related to Linn of Muick at Wikimedia Commons
