= Falls of Divach =

Waterfall in Scotland, ending in the northern shore of Loch Ness

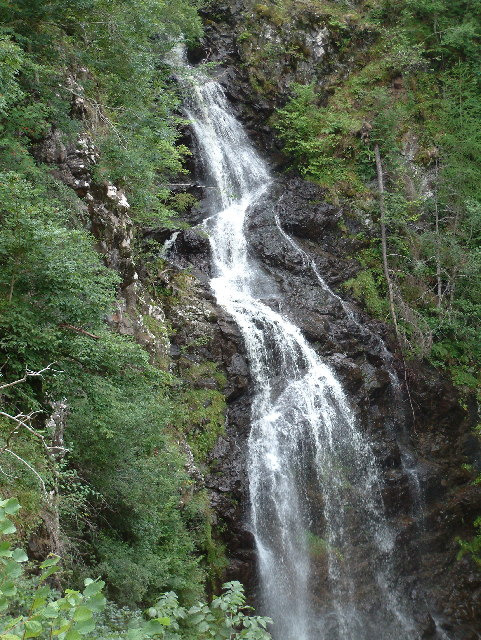
- Falls of Divach in August

- Location within Scotland
- Location: Lewiston village, Scotland
- Coordinates: 57.31224°N 4.50198°W
- Watercourse: River Coiltie

Falls of Divach is a waterfall of Scotland. Pronounced 'Jeevach', the Divach Burn falls 100 feet to the River Coiltie, which continues its course through Lewiston village, the "Cover", then into Urquhart Bay, half way along the northern shore of Loch Ness.

== See also ==
- Waterfalls of Scotland
