= Victoria Falls (disambiguation) =

Victoria Falls is a waterfall in southern Africa on the Zambezi River.

Victoria Falls may also refer to:

- Victoria Falls, Zimbabwe, a town on the Zambezi River in Zimbabwe
  - Victoria Falls Airport, an international airport near the town
- Victoria Falls, Wester Ross, a waterfall in Scotland
