= Lynn Spout =

Coordinates: 55.69857°N 4.73366°W

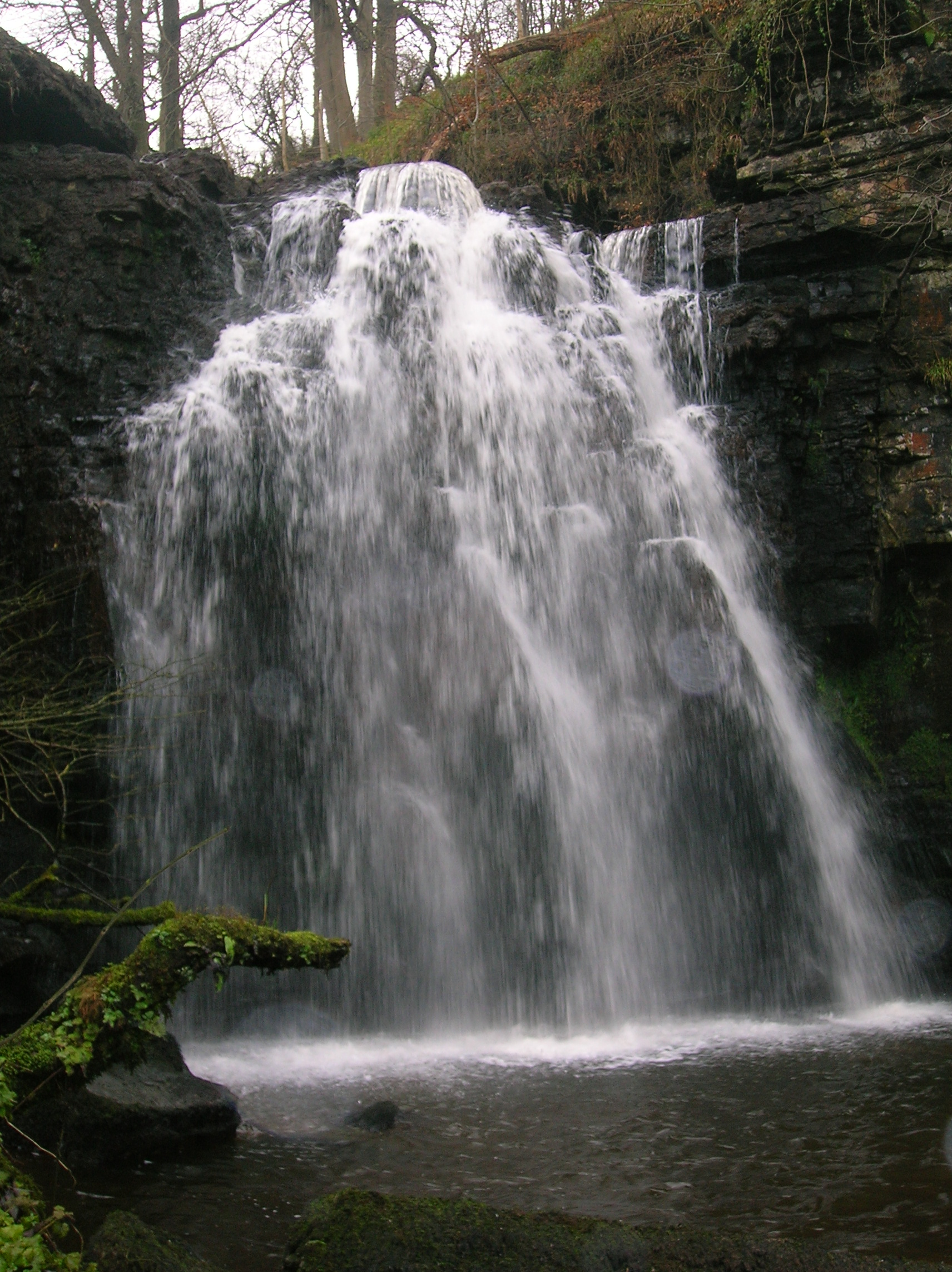

Lynn Spout is a waterfall on the Caaf Water near Dalry in Ayrshire in Scotland.

== See also ==
- Waterfalls of Scotland
