= Garpel Linn =

Coordinates: 55.52255°N 4.18908°W

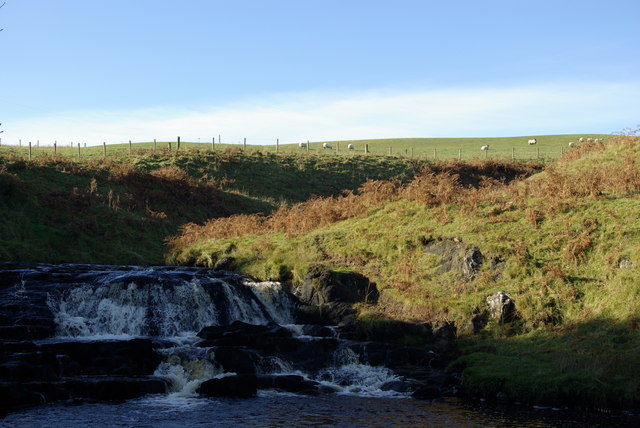
Garpel Linn in November 2008

Garpel Linn is a waterfall of Scotland.

== See also ==
- Waterfalls of Scotland
