= Chest of Dee =

Coordinates: 56.97802°N 3.62546°W

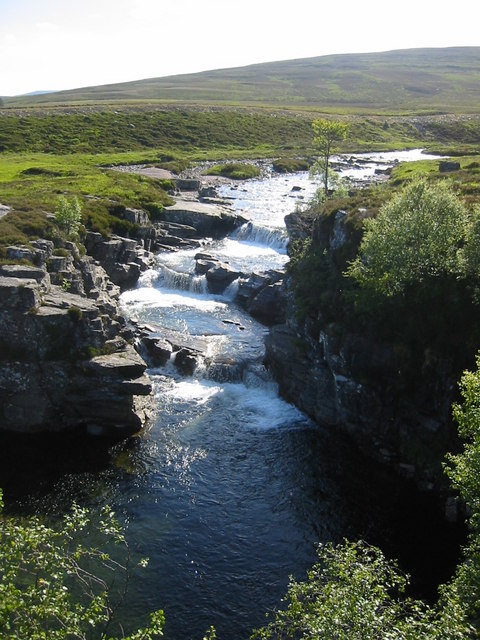
Chest of Dee in July 2006

Chest of Dee is a waterfall of Scotland.

== See also ==
- Waterfalls of Scotland
