= Easan Labhar =

Coordinates: 56.50418°N 6.01392°W

Easan Labhar is a series of waterfalls on the island of Mull, Scotland. It lies on the Allt an Easain Labhair near Gruline west of Salen. There are also unnamed waterfalls on the Allt na Linne burn just to the east.

The Allt an Easain Labhar is a minor tributary of the Allt Glac an Lin, which itself joins the River Ba on the beach at Killiechronan just before it flows into Loch na Keal.

The name Easan Labhar is from the Gaelic language and means "the talkative waterfalls".

== See also ==
- Waterfalls of Scotland
