= Eas Fionn =

Waterfall in Scotland

Coordinates: 57.80608°N 4.97717°W

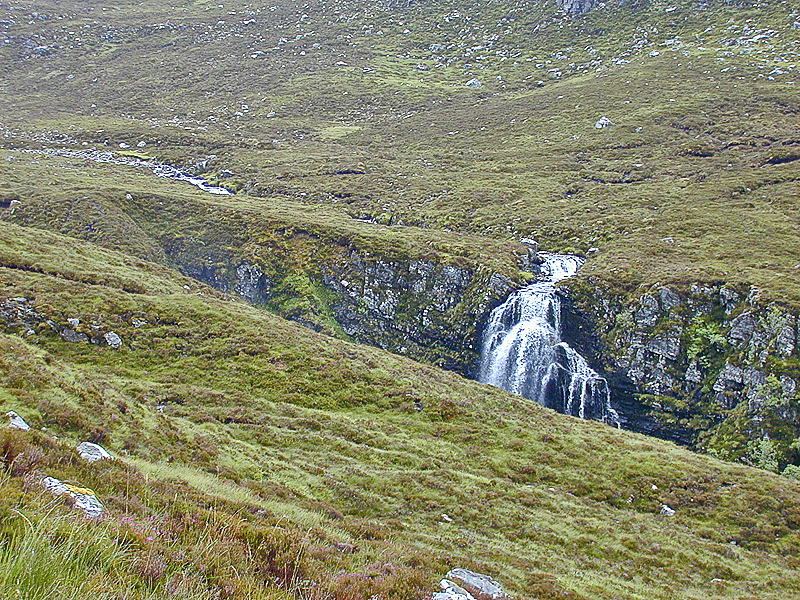
Eas Fionn

Eas Fionn is a waterfall of Scotland.

== See also ==
- Waterfalls of Scotland
