= Grey Mare's Tail, Kinlochmore =

Coordinates: 56.71886°N 4.96422°W

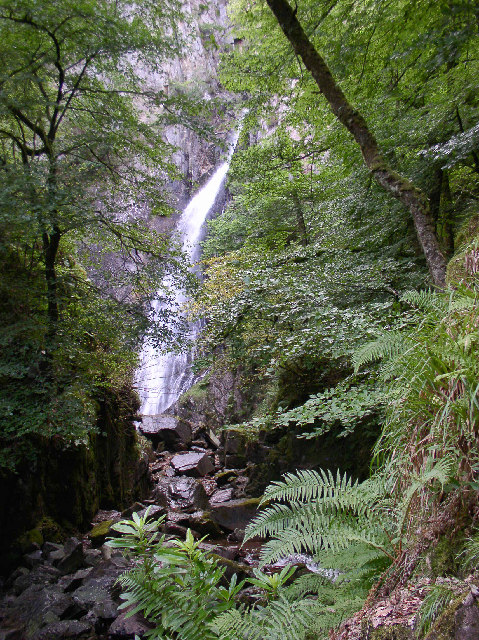
Grey Mare's Tail

Grey Mare's Tail, Kinlochmore, is a waterfall of Scotland.

== See also ==
- List of waterfalls
- Waterfalls of Scotland
