= Bearreraig Waterfall =

Waterfall of Scotland

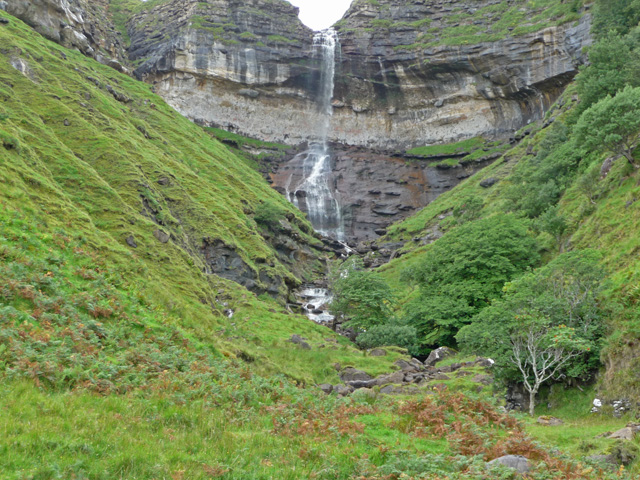
- Bearreraig waterfall

- Location within Scotland
- Location: Skye, Scotland
- Coordinates: 57.49345°N 6.14877°W

Bearreraig Waterfall is a waterfall of Scotland.

It is located on the Trotternish peninsula of the island of Skye, on the Bearreraig River which runs from Loch Leathan to Bearreraig Bay. The valley provides hydro-electric power from a 2.4 MW system.

== See also ==
- Waterfalls of Scotland
