= Downie's Loup =

Coordinates: 56.11309°N 4.08096°W

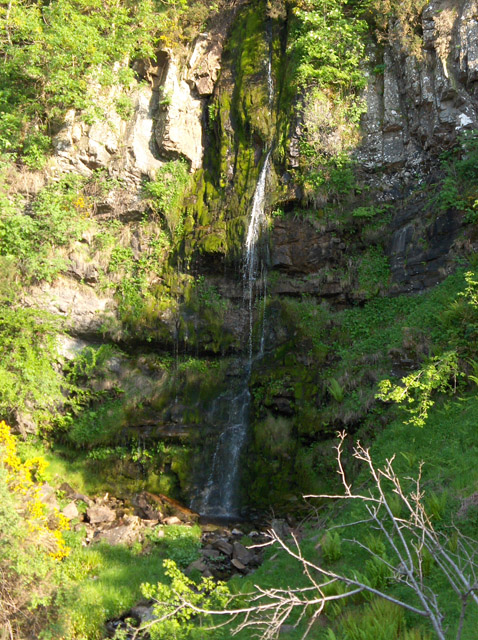
Downie's Loup waterfall

Downie's Loup is a waterfall of Scotland located near the village of Gargunnock.

== See also ==
- Waterfalls of Scotland
