= Falls of Cruachan =

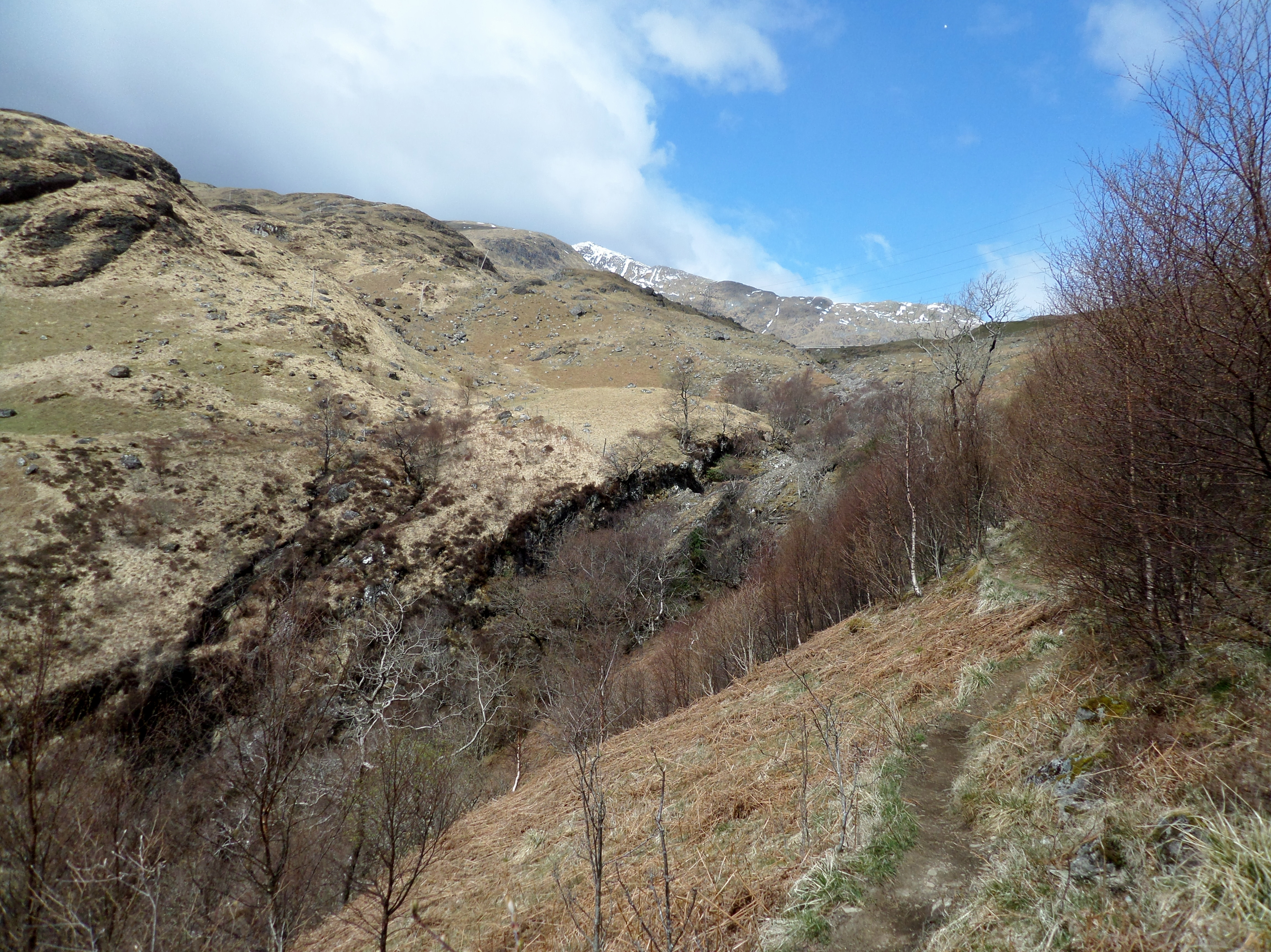

- Location within Scotland
- Location: Scotland
- Coordinates: 56.39519°N 5.11404°W

Falls of Cruachan is a waterfall of Scotland.

== See also ==
- Waterfalls of Scotland
