= Peggie's Spout =

Coordinates: 56.01354°N 4.12212°W

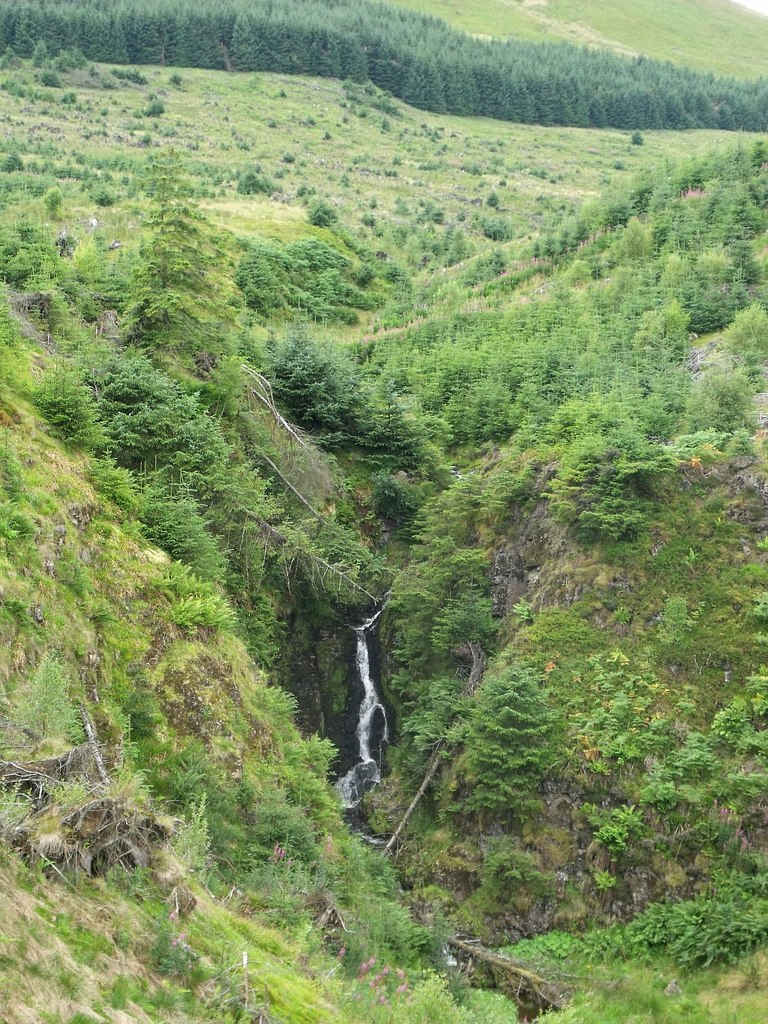
The Bin Burn falls over the lady's rocks.

Peggie's Spout is a waterfall of Scotland.

== See also ==
- Waterfalls of Scotland
