= Eas Chia-aig =

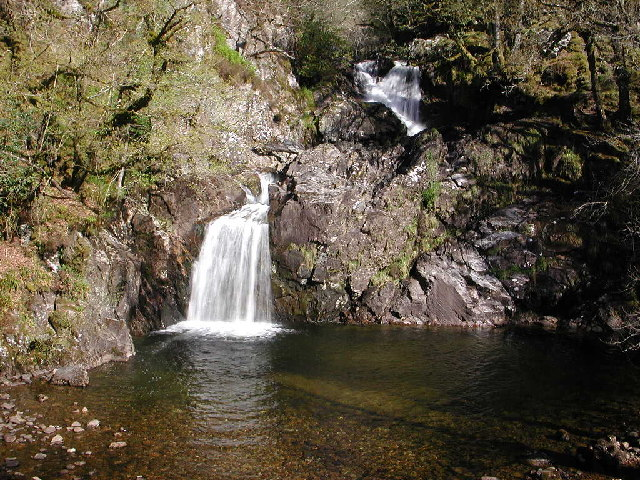
- Eas Chia-aig

- Location within Scotland
- Location: Achnacarry/Clunes, Scotland
- Coordinates: 56.95527°N 5.00107°W

Eas Chia-aig is a waterfall on the Abhainn Chia-aig, in the Highlands of Scotland. The falls are located between Loch Lochy and Loch Arkaig, near Achnacarry and Clunes.

== See also ==
- Waterfalls of Scotland
