= Falls of Unich =

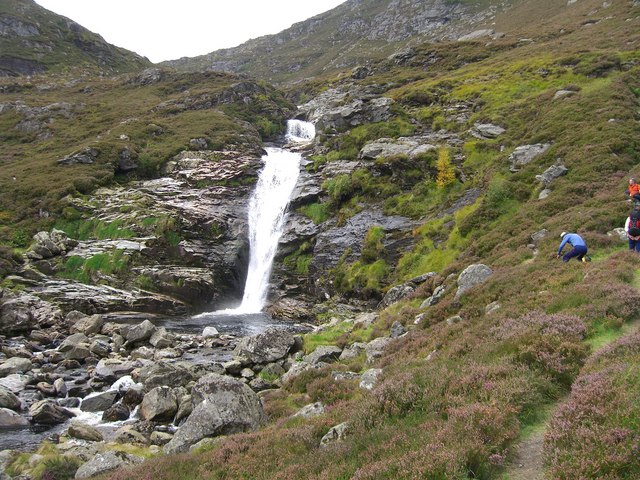
- Falls of Unich

- Location within Scotland
- Location: Angus, Scotland
- Coordinates: 56.90904°N 3.00989°W

Falls of Unich is a waterfall of Scotland.

== See also ==
- Waterfalls of Scotland
