= Falls of Balgy =

Coordinates: 57.52309°N 5.59395°W

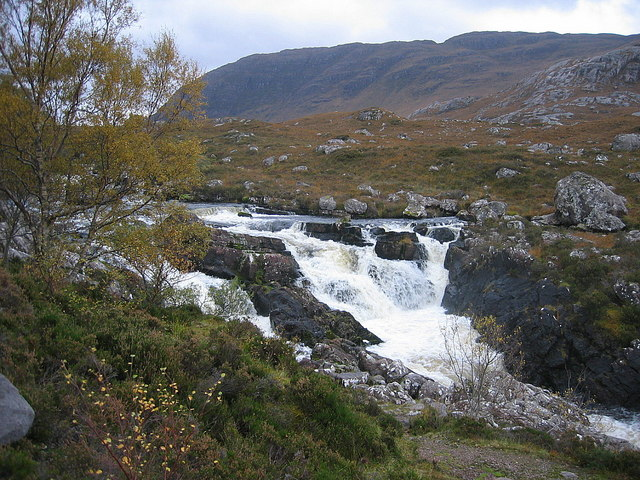
Balgy Falls in November

Falls of Balgy is a waterfall near Torridon in Scotland.

== See also ==
- Waterfalls of Scotland
