= Eas a' Chrannaig =

Coordinates: 55.479053°N 5.119133°W

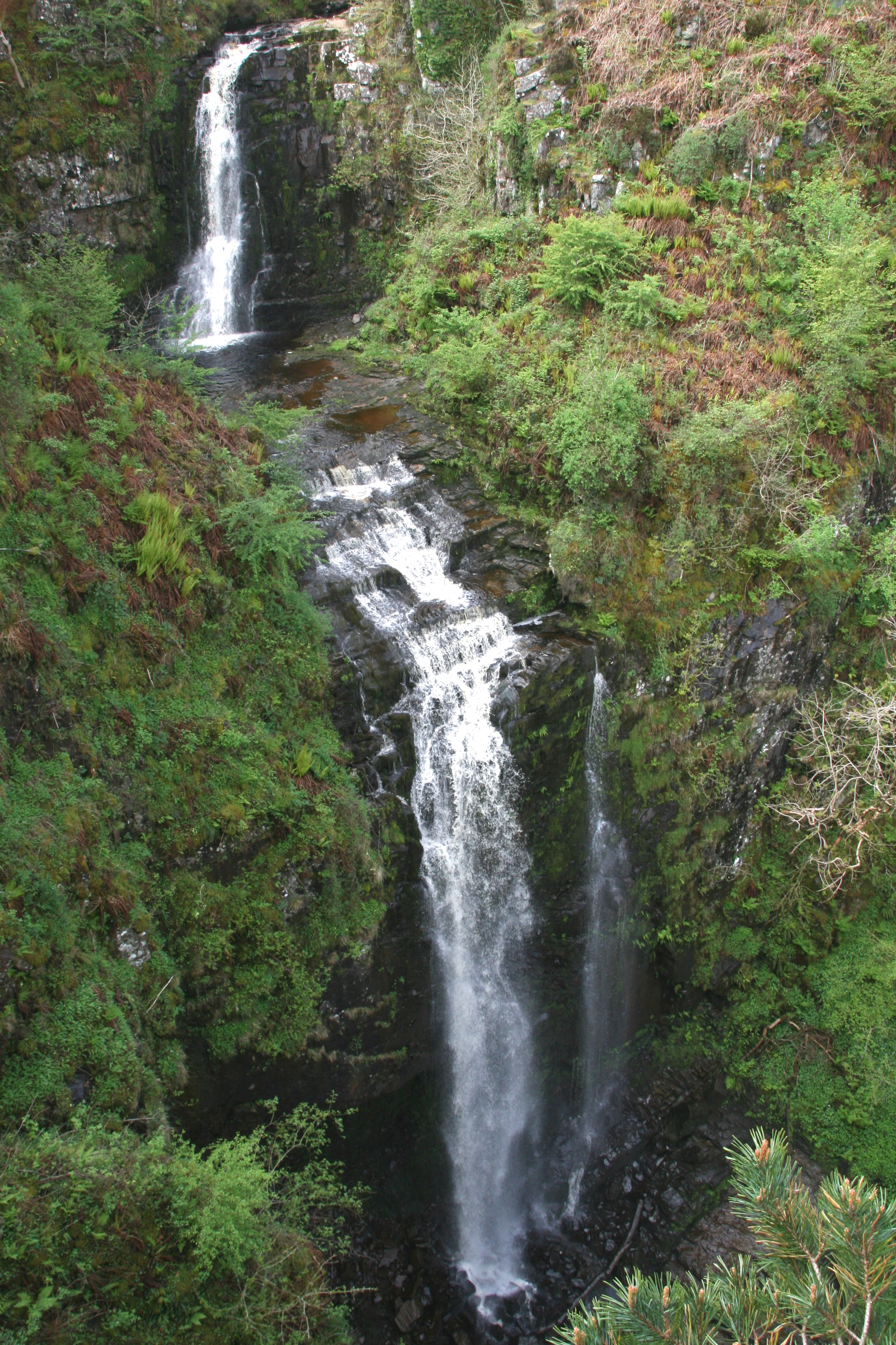
Glenashdale Falls

Eas a' Chrannaig also known as the Glenashdale Falls is a waterfall on the island of Arran, Scotland. There are a series of falls on the Glenashdale Burn, which flows from moorland near the summit of Tighvein eastwards towards Whiting Bay, from which there is a tourist trail leading some 4 kilometres (2.5 mi) up Glenashdale.

== See also ==
- Waterfalls of Scotland
