= Falls of Edinample =

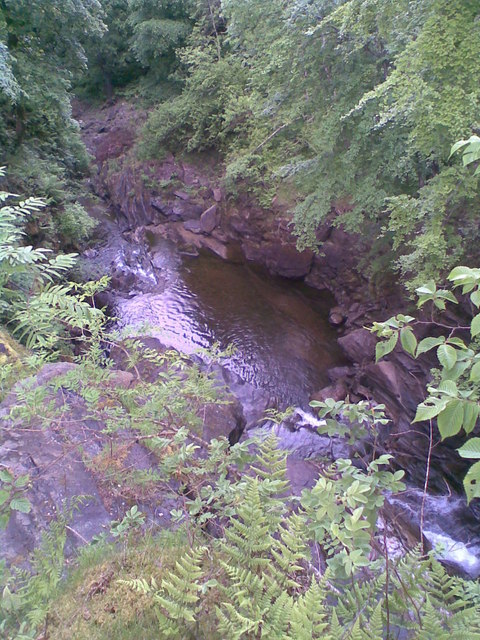
- The pool at the bottom of the falls of Edinample

- Location within Scotland
- Location: Craggan, Stirling, Scotland
- Coordinates: 56.37317°N 4.26516°W

The falls of Edinample is a waterfall near the village of Craggan in the district of Stirling in Scotland.

== See also ==
- Waterfalls of Scotland
