= Fairy Loup =

Waterfall in Dumfries and Galloway, Scotland

Coordinates: 55.09452°N 2.94953°W

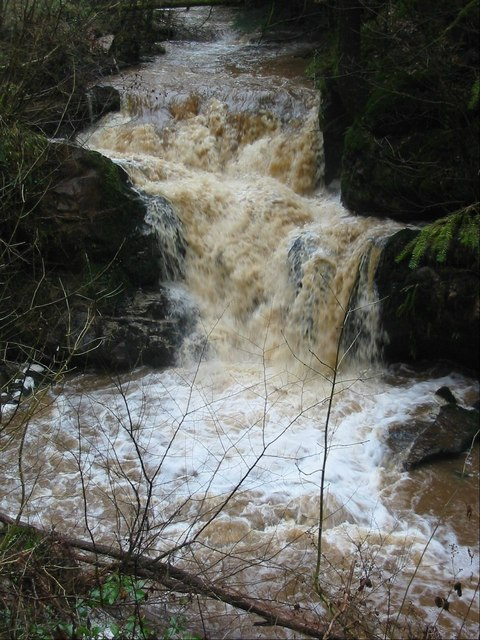
Fairy Loup in flood

Fairy Loup is a waterfall located on Byre Burn, a tributary of River Esk, in Dumfries and Galloway, Scotland.

The waterfall's name originates in a local legend of "a fairy having leaped from one side to the other", and is an example of a regional tradition of associating small streams with fairies. This waterfall was one of several features near Langholm described in the poetry of Hugh MacDiarmid.

A 14.5-kilometre (9.0 mi) loop trail passing through Canonbie and Rowanburn gives access to the waterfall. Fly-tipping has been a problem in the area.

== See also ==
- List of waterfalls of Scotland

== Bibliography ==
- Bold, Alan (1990). MacDiarmid: A Critical Biography. University of Massachusetts Press. ISBN 978-0-87023-714-0.
- Ordnance Survey Name Books. Vol. Dumfriesshire Volume 4. Ordnance Survey. 1848–1858.
- Hyslop, John; Hyslop, Robert (1912). Langholm as It Was: A History of Langholm and Eskdale From the Earliest Times. Hills and Company. OCLC 25402682.
