= Kilfinnan Fall =

Waterfall in Scotland

Coordinates: 57.02890°N 4.85042°W

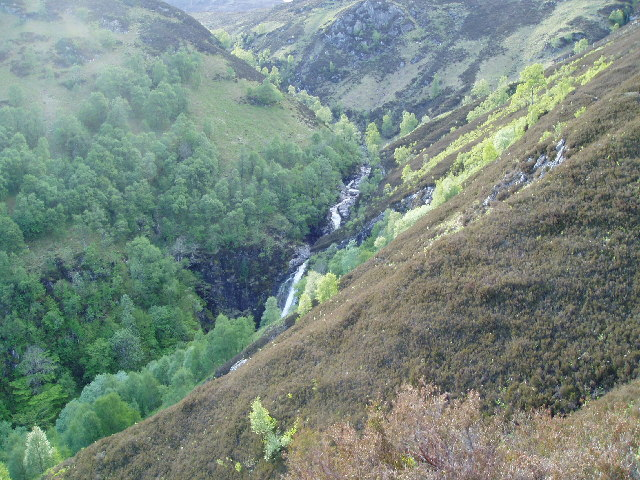
Kilfinnan Fall

Kilfinnan Fall is a waterfall of Scotland.

== See also ==
- Waterfalls of Scotland
