= Falls of Moness =

Waterfall in Perth and Kinross, Scotland

Coordinates: 56.60348°N 3.87162°W

Falls of Moness is a waterfall of Scotland. The Falls of Moness located in Aberfeldy, Perthshire, Scotland is a 150m high waterfall tucked away in the Birks of Aberfeldy.

== See also ==
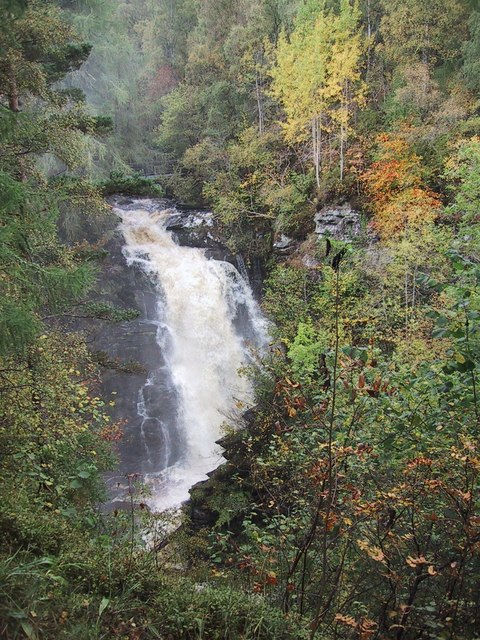
- Falls Of Moness
  Waterfalls of Scotland
