= Falls of Damff =

Waterfall in Angus, Scotland

Coordinates: 56.89915°N 3.01127°W

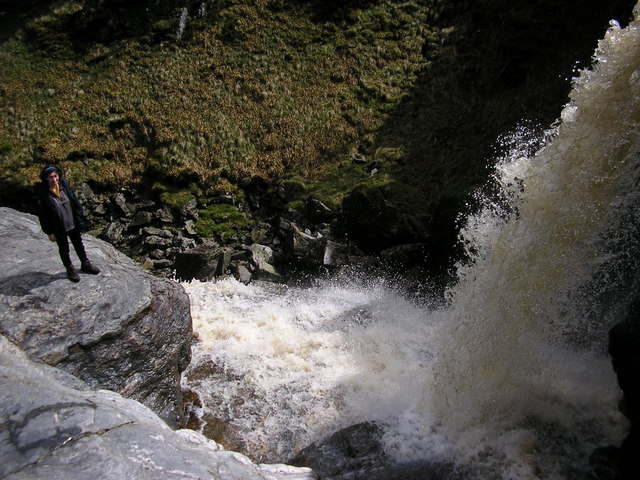
The Falls of Damff in May

Falls of Damff is a waterfall in Cairngorms National Park in Scotland.

== See also ==
- Waterfalls of Scotland
