= Drunmore Linn =

Coordinates: 55.28609°N 4.51937°W

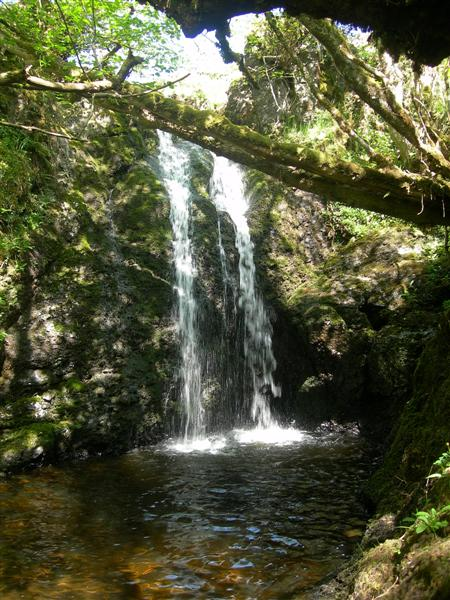
Drunmore Linn waterfall on Baing Burn

Drunmore Linn is a waterfall of Scotland, near Straiton, South Ayrshire.

== See also ==
- Waterfalls of Scotland
