= Eas Fors =

Coordinates: 56.56828°N 6.19664°W

Eas Fors is a waterfall on the island of Mull in Scotland. It is situated on the Ardow Burn south of Dervaig. There is another Eas Fors on the Allt an Eas Fors (Eas Fors Burn) on the west coast of Mull north of Ulva Ferry.

The name is tautologous: eas is Gaelic for waterfall, and fors or foss is also Norse for waterfall, so "Eas Fors" means "waterfall waterfall."

== See also ==
- Waterfalls of Scotland
