= Stinchar Falls =

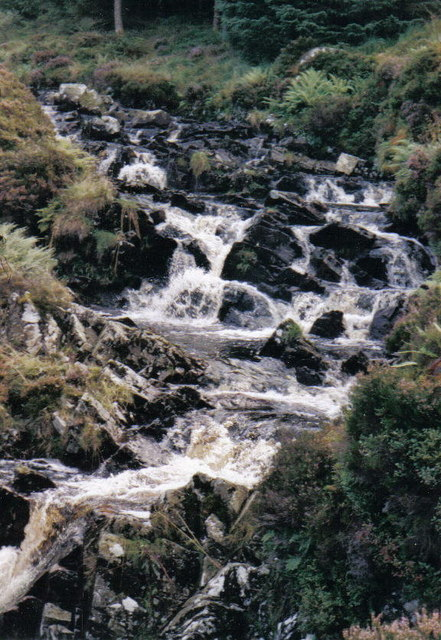
- Stinchar Falls, Stinchar Bridge; Autumn 2004

- Location within Scotland
- Location: Stinchar Burn, South Ayrshire, Scotland
- Coordinates: 55.23394°N 4.56326°W

Stinchar Falls is a waterfall of Scotland. It is located on the Stinchar Burn, east of Barr in Ayrshire.

== See also ==
- Waterfalls of Scotland
