= Falls of Dee =

Coordinates: 56.99892°N 3.74161°W

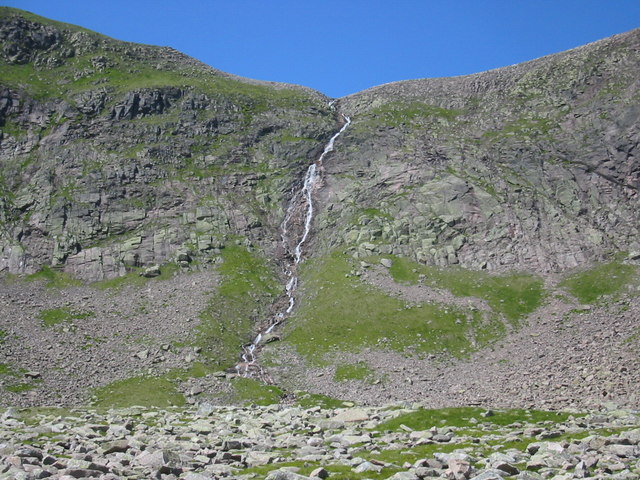
Falls of Dee in July

Falls of Dee is a waterfall on Braeriach in the Cairngorms, Scotland.

It is the highest waterfall in the country by altitude, falling from an altitude of approximately 1200 m to 1000 m above sea level. It marks the source of the River Dee, Scotland's fifth longest river. The waterfall can be accessed at its base by following the Dee up from the Corrour Bothy, but there is no clear path there, and the ridge walk from Cairn Toul to Braeriach - which passes by the lip of the falls - is more commonly used.

The waterfall is one of the highest in Scotland, but due to its remoteness is less quoted.

== See also ==
- Waterfalls of Scotland
