= Eas Creag an Luchda =

Waterfall in Highland, Scotland

Coordinates: 58.25317°N 4.87991°W

Eas Creag an Luchda is a waterfall of Scotland.

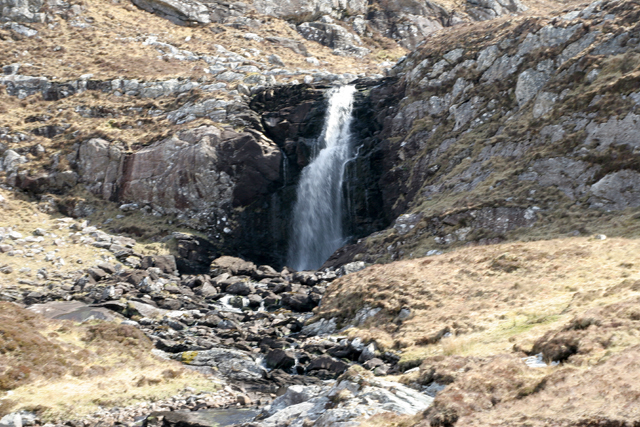
The Eas Creag an Luchda - geograph.org.uk - 166934

== See also ==
- Waterfalls of Scotland
