= Inverlair Falls =

Waterfall in Scotland

Coordinates: 56.88783°N 4.72801°W

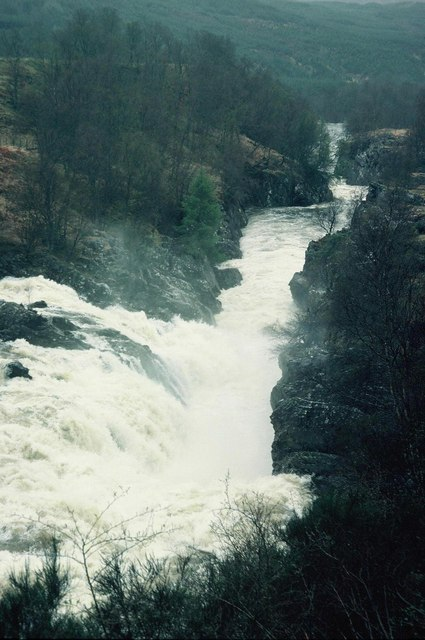
Inverlair Falls

Inverlair Falls is a waterfall of Scotland.

== See also ==
- Waterfalls of Scotland
