= Spout of Garnock =

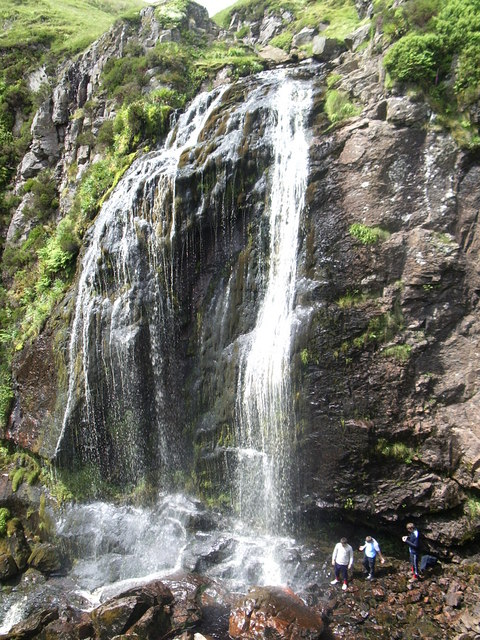
- The Spout of Garnock

- Location within Scotland
- Location: Ayrshire, Scotland
- Coordinates: 55°48′40″N 4°44′06.5″W
- Watercourse: River Garnock

The Spout of Garnock (or Garnock Spout) is a waterfall in Ayrshire, Scotland. At approximately 60–70 ft high, it is the county's highest waterfall. It is not the source of the River Garnock, as is sometimes said, but is located about a mile and a half from the river's birth.

== See also ==
- Waterfalls of Scotland
