= Falls of Roy =

Coordinates: 56.99177°N 4.70104°W

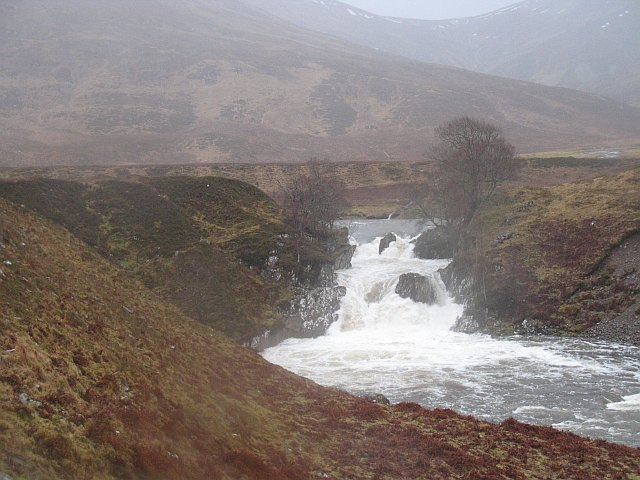
Falls of Roy

Falls of Roy is a waterfall of Scotland.

== See also ==
- Waterfalls of Scotland
