= Ishneich =

Coordinates: 56.00142°N 4.48233°W

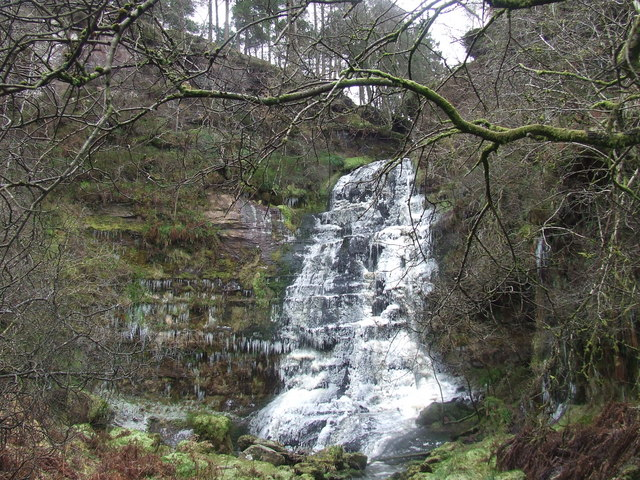
January 2009, frozen falls

Ishneich is a waterfall of Scotland.

This stunning waterfall can be reached by following the John Muir trail past the Burncrooks reservoir and through the forest. Venture off the John Muir trail along a red coloured forest path on the left just before you reach trees on either side of the path. At the bottom of this path is the burn that feeds the falls. Follow the fence line until you reach a style, cross over the style and the falls are at the bottom of the hill. GPS location for google maps 56°00'05.1"N 4°28'56.4"W

== See also ==
- Waterfalls of Scotland
