= Falls of Barvick =

Coordinates: 56.39871°N 3.86480°W

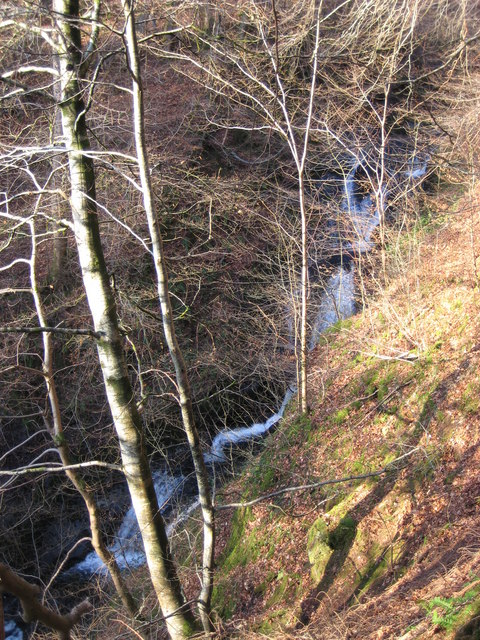
Falls of Barvick in February

Falls of Barvick is a waterfall in Scotland. It is 492 feet (150 m) at its highest point and has an average width of 20 feet (6.1 m). It is a cascades type waterfall.

== See also ==
- Waterfalls of Scotland
