= Falls of Falloch =

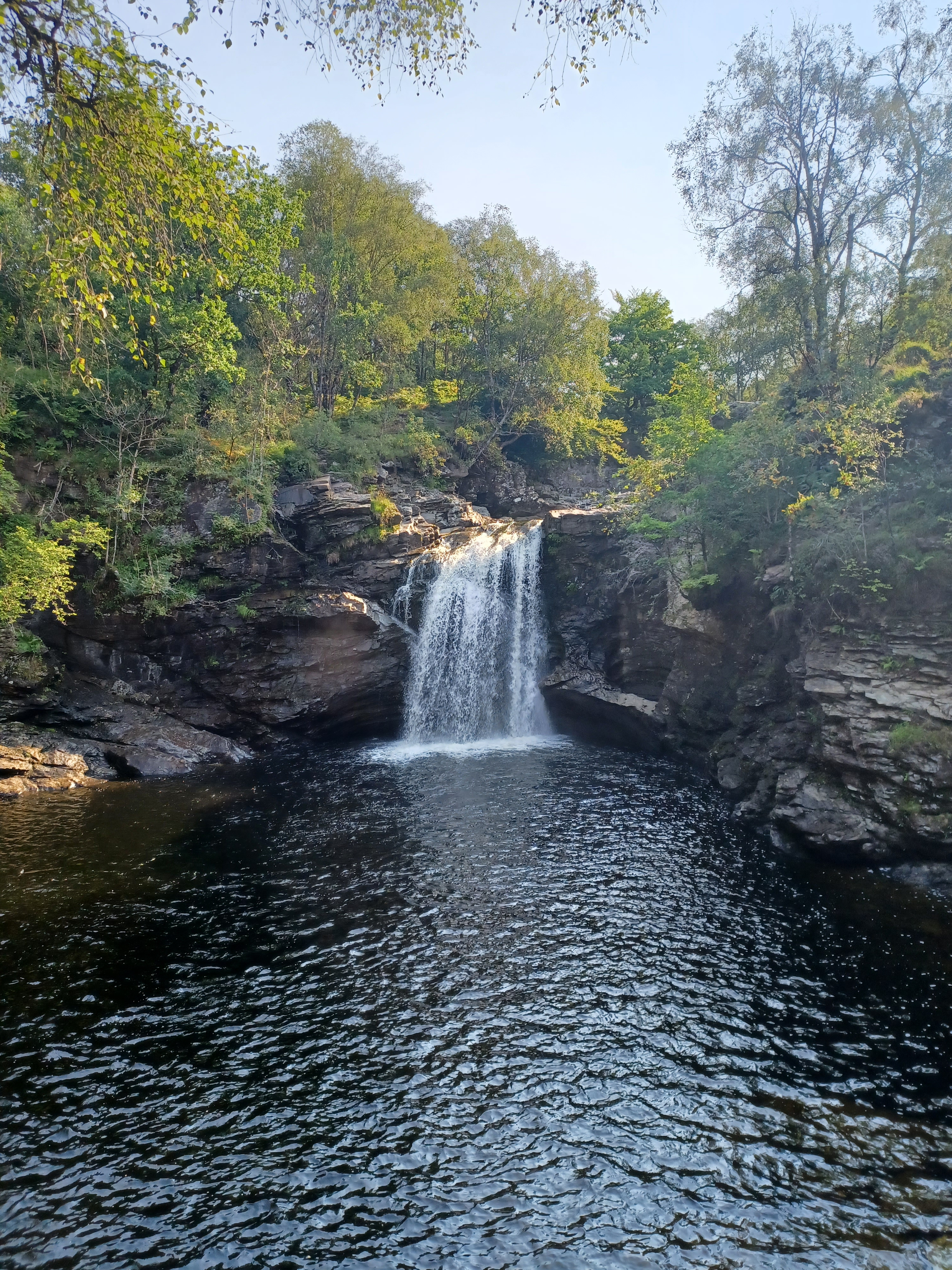
- Falls of Falloch

- Location within Scotland
- Location: Crianlarich, Stirling, Scotland
- Coordinates: 56.35027°N 4.69111°W
- Total height: 9 metres or 30 feet
- Watercourse: Falloch

Falls of Falloch (Gaelic: Eas Falach, means waterfall of the river Falloch) is a waterfall and local beauty spot on the river Falloch off the A82. It is 7 km (4 mi) south-west of the village of Crianlarich in the county of Stirling in Scotland. It is also on the West Highland Way.

== History ==
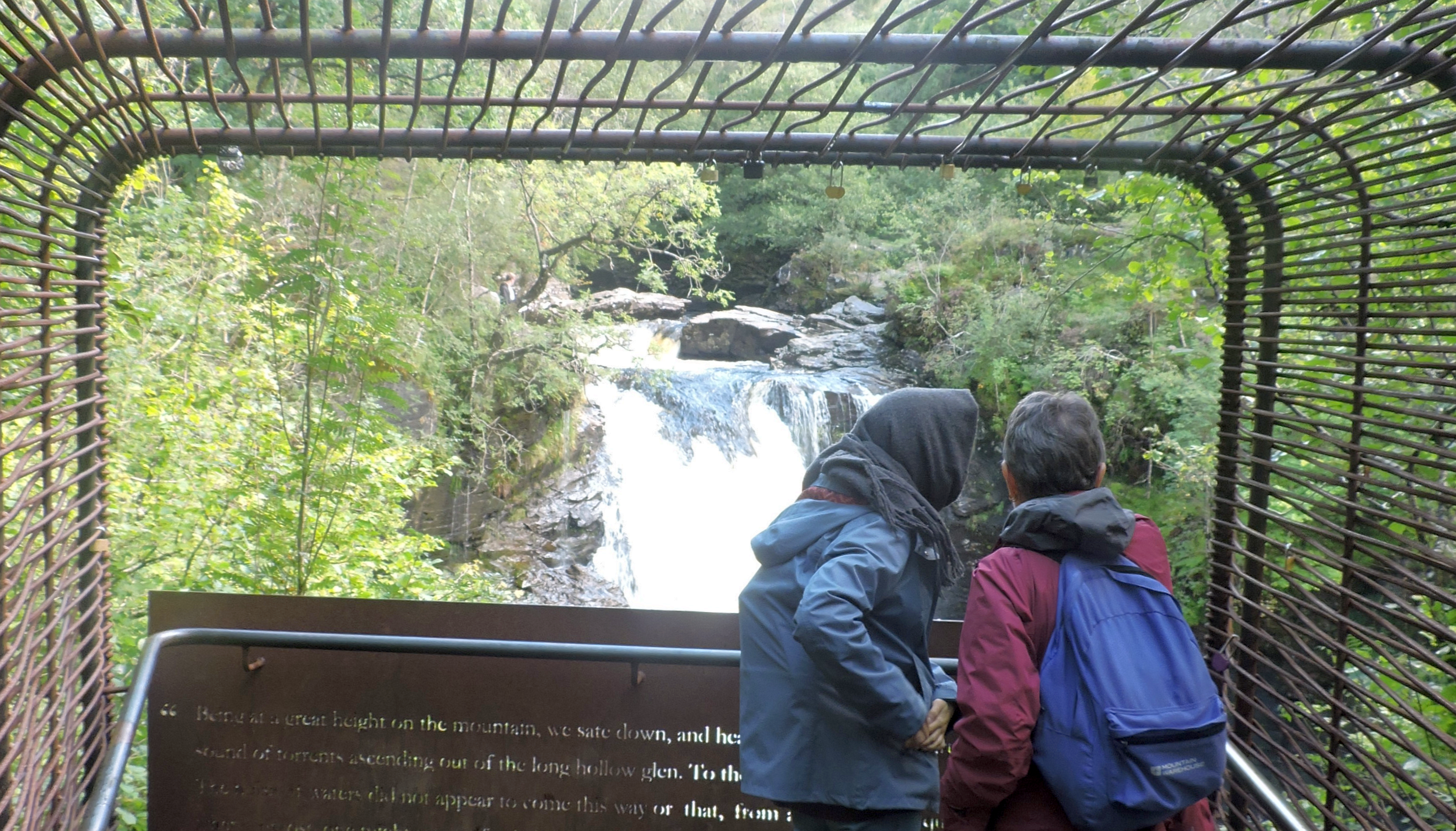
The viewpoint in 2018

Dorothy Wordsworth, the sister of William Wordsworth visited here on their famous tour of Scotland along with Samuel Coleridge. She, along with other writers and painters appreciated the view of the falls as far as early 19th century. The huge pool down the waterfall is known as the Rob Roy's Bathtub; in the same pool the Scottish mountaineer W. H. Murray was about to drown after falling by accident into the Falloch in the gorge upstream the waterfall. In 2013 was built the Woven Sound, a viewpoint built in order to enable visitors to safely observe the waterfall without disturbing the natural beauty of the spot.

== Nature conservation ==
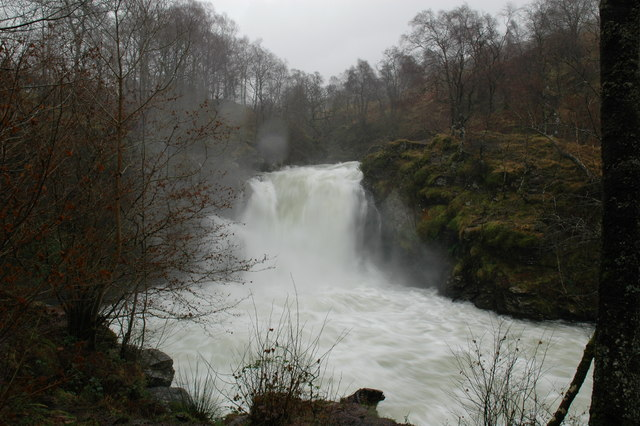
Winter view

The waterfall and its surrounding area belong to the Loch Lomond and The Trossachs National Park.

== See also ==
- Waterfalls of Scotland
