= Falls of Lochay =

Waterfall in Scotland

Coordinates: 56.48539°N 4.36767°W

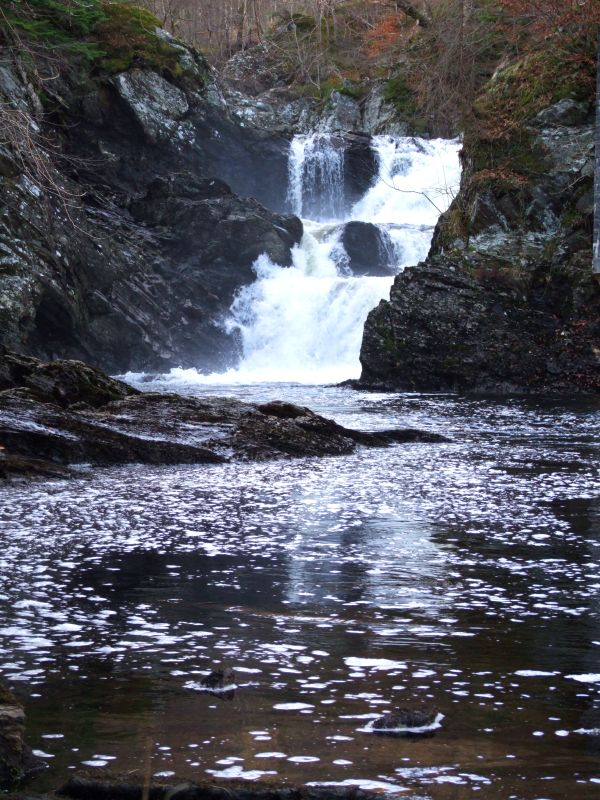
Falls of Lochay

Falls of Lochay is a waterfall in Scotland, near Killin.

== See also ==
- Waterfalls of Scotland
