= Eas Maol Mhairi =

Waterfall in Scotland

Coordinates: 57.35009°N 4.79548°W

Eas Maol Mhairi is a waterfall of Scotland. Just east of this waterfall is the River Cannich.

== See also ==
- Waterfalls of Scotland
