= Plodda Falls =

Waterfall near Glen Affric, Scotland

Coordinates: 57.27226°N 4.85926°W

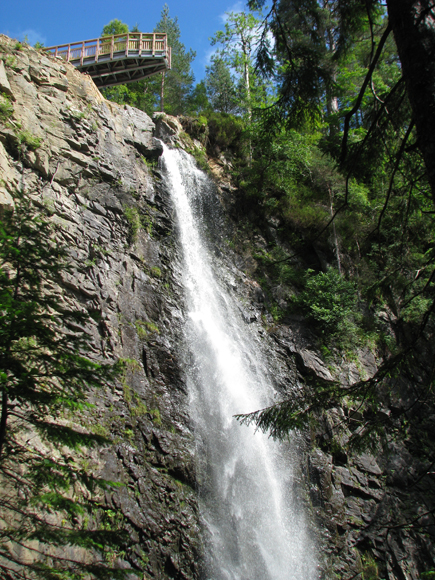
Plodda Falls

Plodda Falls (Gaelic: Eas Ploda) is a waterfall, situated 5 km south-west of the village of Tomich, near Glen Affric, in the Highlands of Scotland. The falls are 46 m high, and are on the Allt na Bodachan, near where it flows into the Abhainn Deabhag, which in turn joins with the River Affric to form the River Glass.

Plodda Falls are a popular tourist attraction. In 1880, a footbridge was built across the top of the falls, by Lord Tweedmouth, who owned the Guisachan estate. In 2005, the Forestry Commission found this bridge to be dangerous, and it was closed. It was replaced by a new viewing platform in 2009.

== See also ==
- Waterfalls of Scotland
