= Eas a' Bhradain =

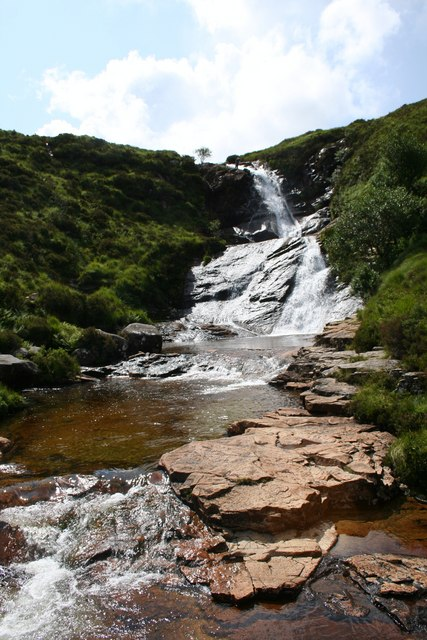
- Eas a’ Bhradain

- Location within Scotland
- Location: Skye, Scotland
- Coordinates: 57.26238°N 6.09284°W

Eas a' Bhradain is a waterfall of Scotland.

It is located between Marsco and Loch Ainort on the Allt Coire nam Bruadaran of the island of Skye at grid reference NG531262

== See also ==
- Waterfalls of Scotland
