= Culnaskiach Falls =

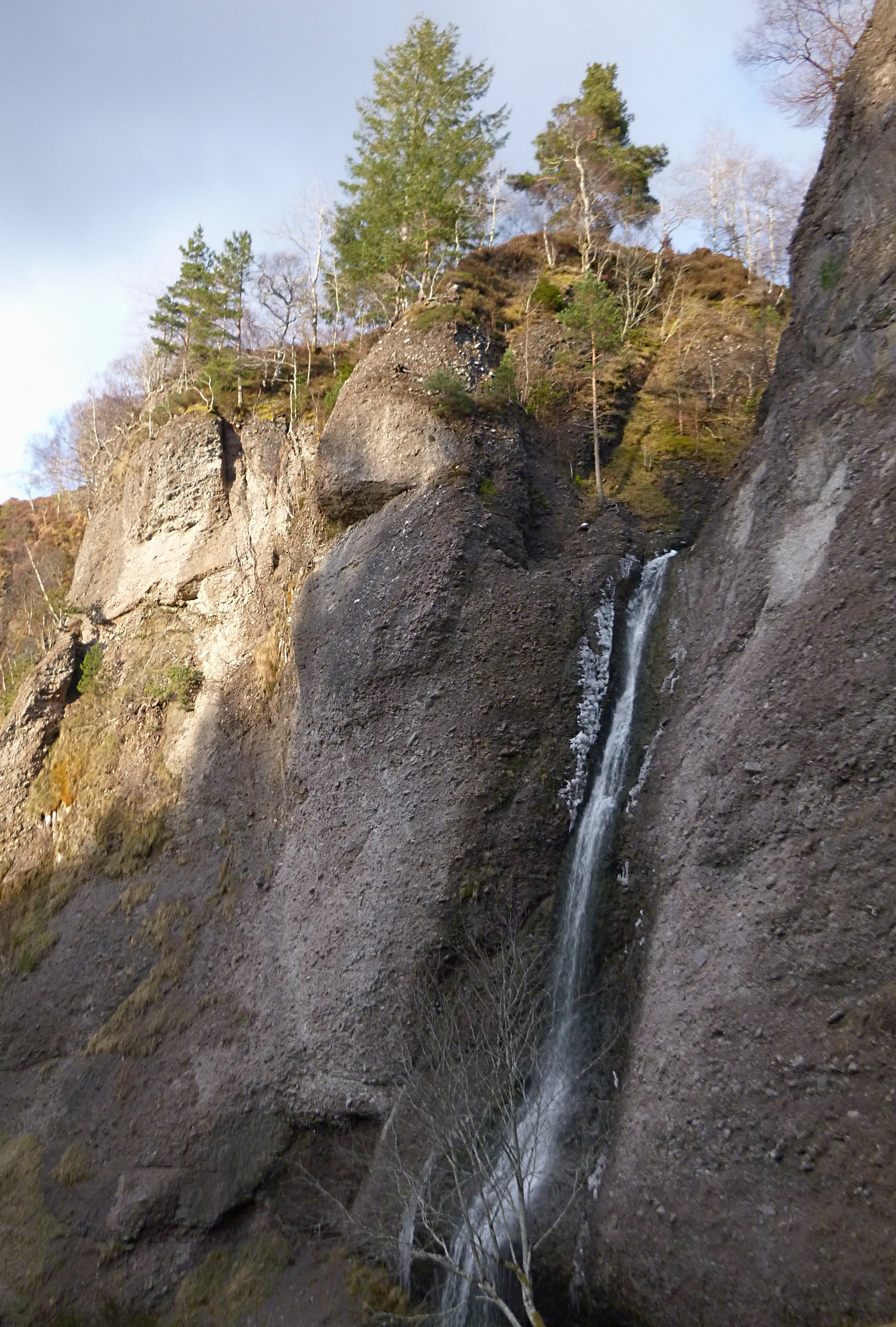
- Culnaskiach Falls

- Location within Scotland
- Location: Kiltarlity, Scotland
- Coordinates: 57.39008°N 4.51893°W

Culnaskiach Falls is a waterfall in Boblainy Forest, to the south of the village of Kiltarlity, in the Highland council area of Scotland. It is on a small stream which flows into the Bruiach Burn.

== See also ==
- Waterfalls of Scotland
