= Waukers Linn =

Waterfall in Dumfries and Galloway, Scotland

Coordinates: 55.14222°N 4.22083°W

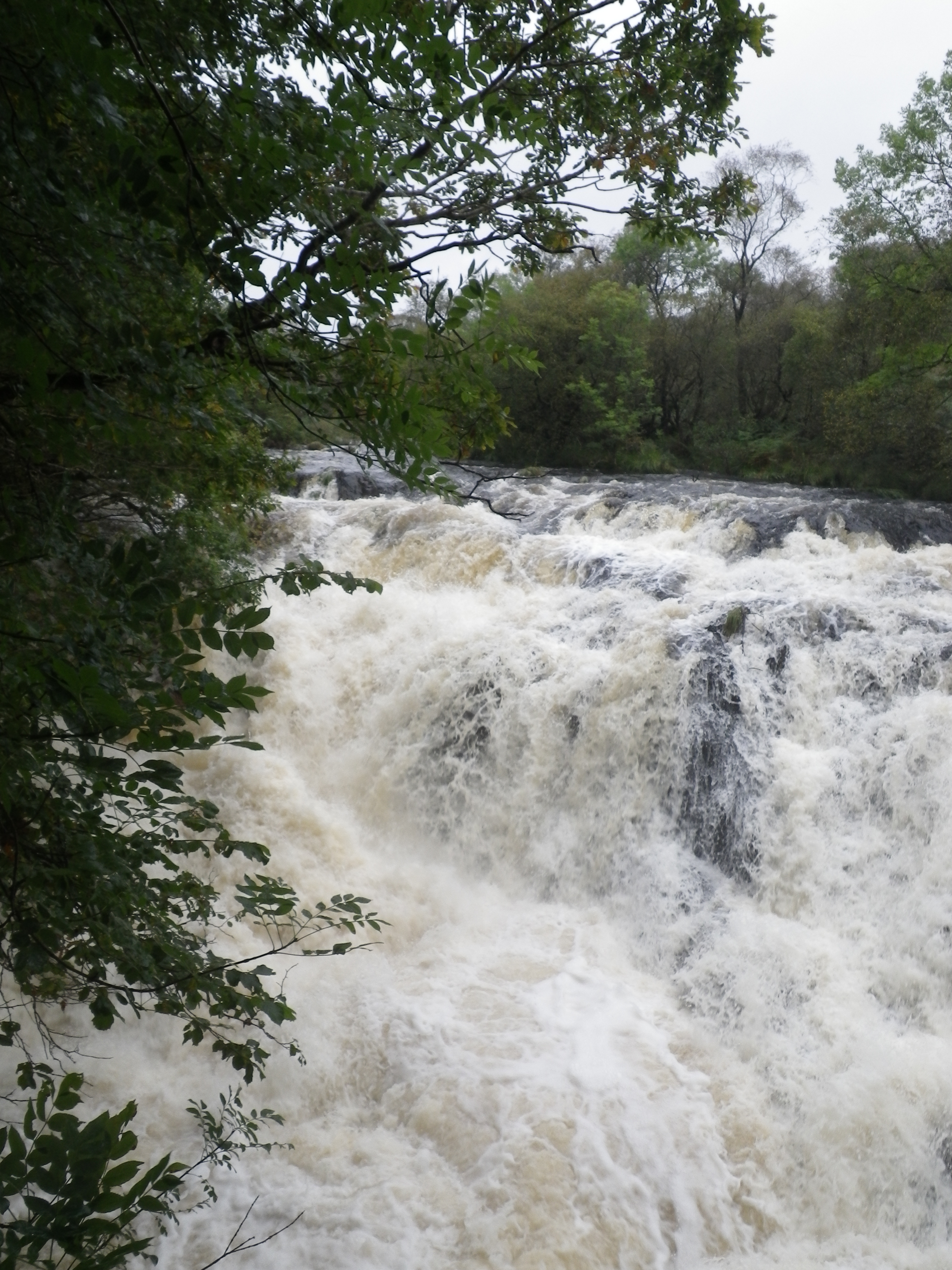
Waukers Linn in spate

Waukers Linn is a waterfall on Polharrow Burn in Dumfries and Galloway, Scotland.

== See also ==
- Waterfalls of Scotland
