= Hespies Linn =

Coordinates: 55.02194°N 4.42454°W

Hespies Linn is a waterfall of Scotland located in the south-west of the country, near the village of Cairnryan in the county of Dumfries and Galloway.

== See also ==
- Waterfalls of Scotland
