= Inversnaid Falls =

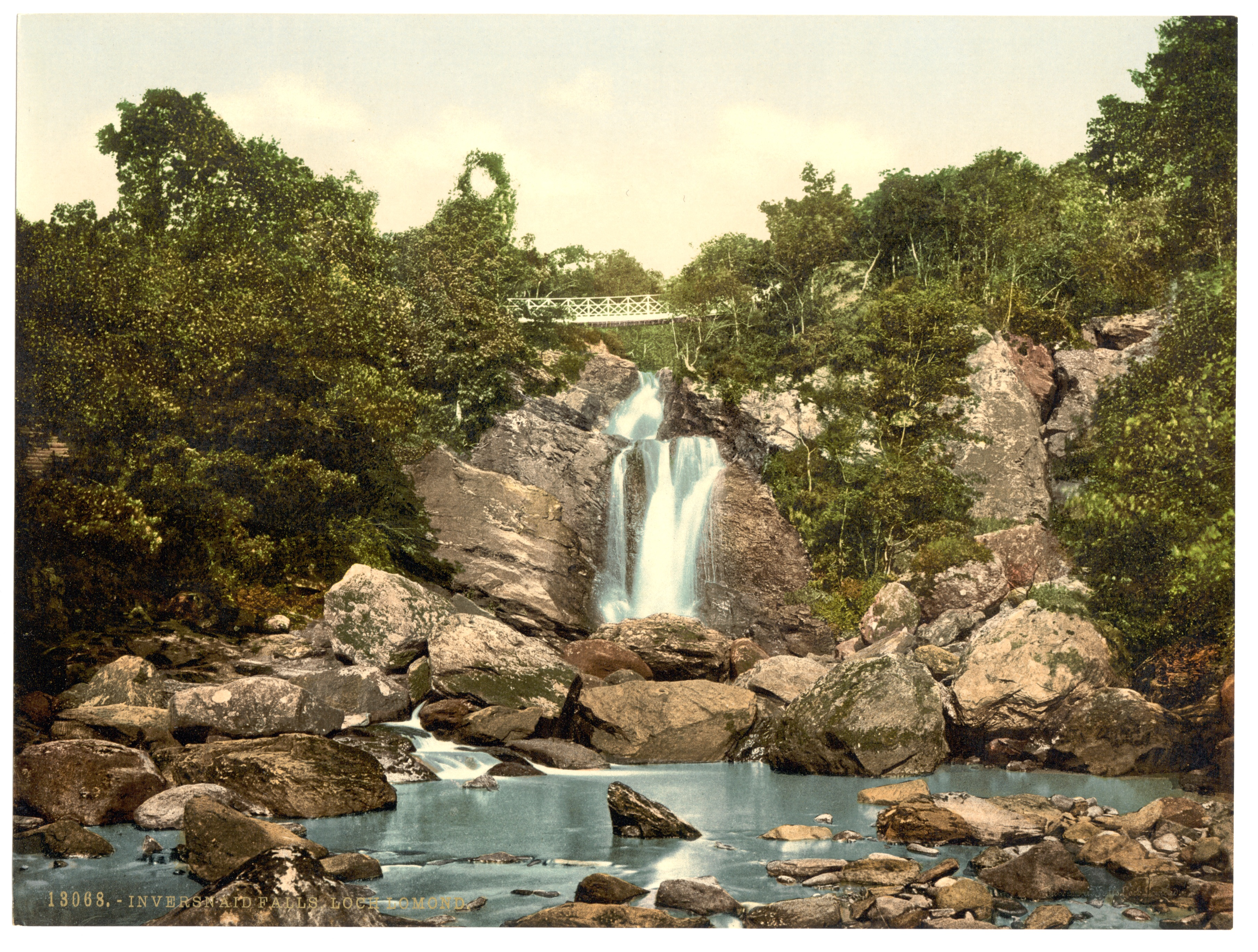
- Inversnaid Falls, Loch Lomond, Scotland

- Location within Scotland
- Location: Stirling, Scotland
- Coordinates: 56.242461°N 4.683856°W

Inversnaid Falls is a waterfall of Scotland.

== See also ==
- Waterfalls of Scotland
