= Falls of Turret =

Coordinates: 56.39665°N 3.88252°W

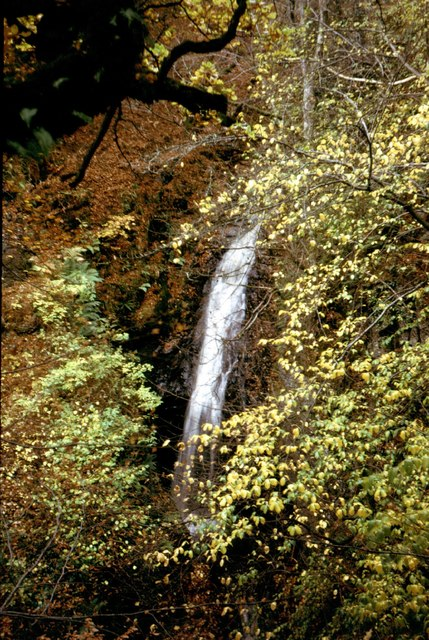
Falls of Turret in Autumn

Falls of Turret is a waterfall of Scotland.

== See also ==
- Waterfalls of Scotland
