= Linn of Quoich =

Coordinates: 57.00434°N 3.45866°W

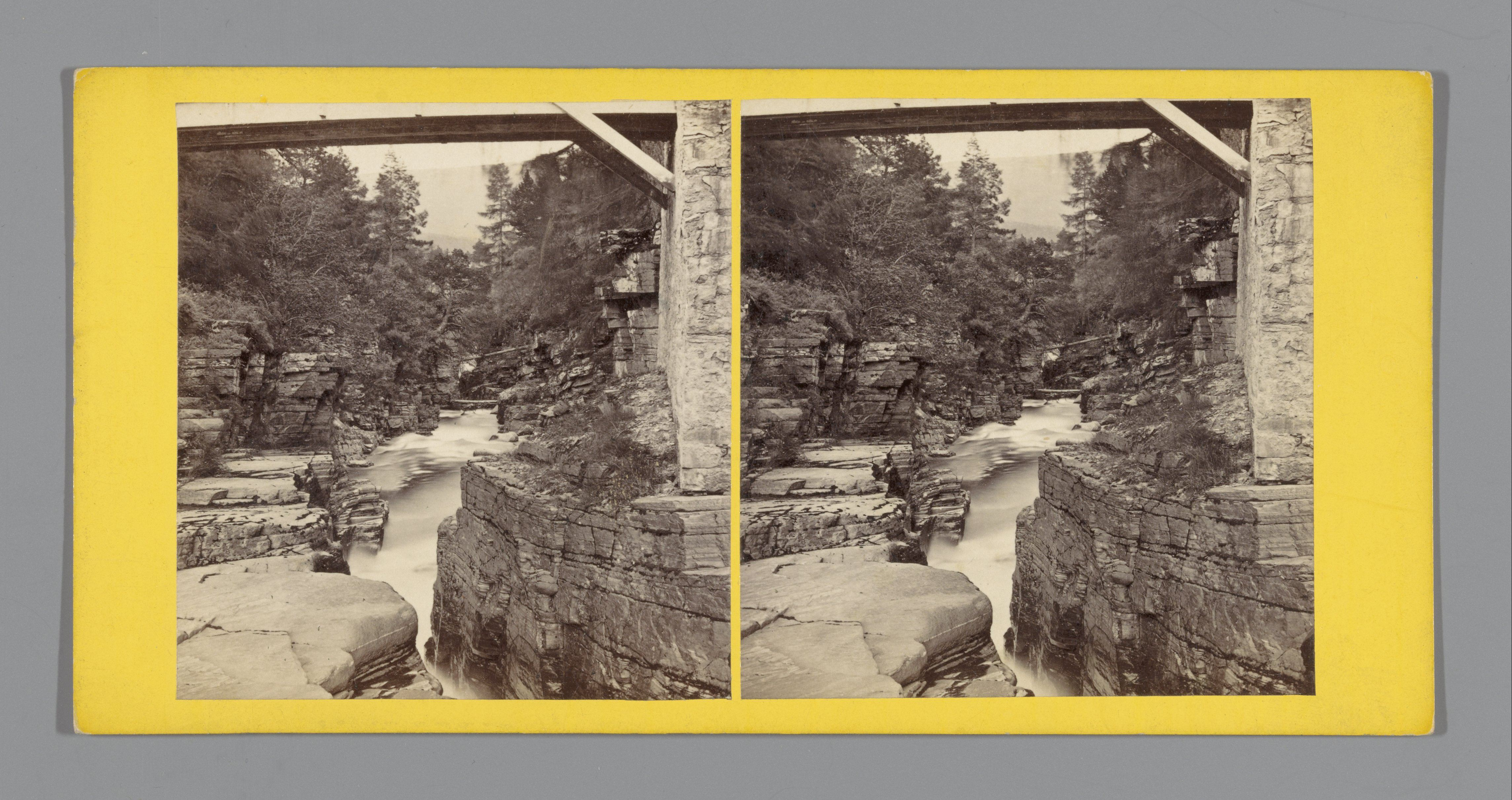
Stereo card of the waterfall, taken between ca. 1850 and ca. 1880 by George Washington Wilson

Linn of Quoich is a waterfall of Scotland.

== See also ==
- Waterfalls of Scotland
