= Lewiston, Highland =

Coordinates: 57.32212°N 4.4777°W

Lewiston: Scottish Gaelic: Blàr na Maigh
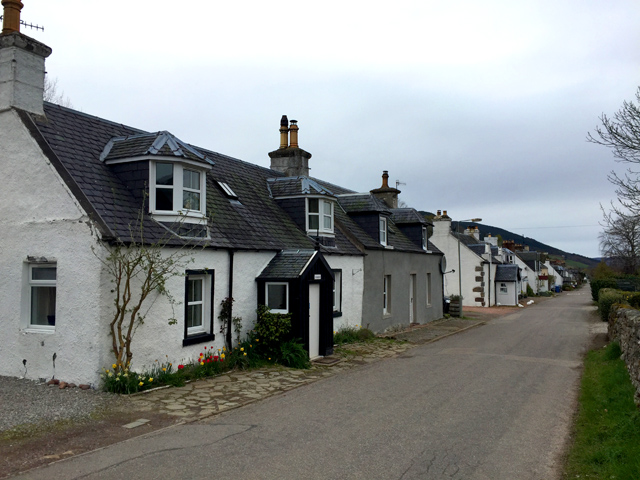
- Linear cottages

- Location within the Inverness area
- OS grid reference: NH509284
- Council area: Highland
- Country: Scotland
- Sovereign state: United Kingdom
- Post town: Drumnadrochit
- Postcode district: IV63 6
- Police: Scotland
- Fire: Scottish
- Ambulance: Scottish

Lewiston is a small linear village, situated less than 1 mile southeast of Drumnadrochit, in Inverness-shire, Scottish Highlands and is in the Scottish council area of Highland.

== History ==
=== Balmacaan Estate ===
Much of Glenurquhart was part of the Balmacaan Estate (AKA: The Glen Urquhart Estate), owned by the Grant family of Seafield between 1509 and 1946. The estate It was rented to the wealthy American industrialist and local benefactor Bradley Martin late 19th and early 20th century and flourished in the 1880s and 1890s, but went into decline after the 1920s. The estate then changed hands frequently enough that the issue was raised in parliament The best forestry wood had been felled during World War 2 and the estate was dissolved in 1946. Balmacaan House, near Drumnadrochit, was abandoned soon afterwards set on fire by vandals in the 1960s and demolished in 1972.

In 1946 Bunloit Farm was separated from Balmacaan Estate and Bunloit Estate was formed round it. near the small settlement of Balbeg, located on the north west shore of Loch Ness, about 4 miles south of Drumnadrochit.

=== The village ===
In 1767 Sir James Grant provided house stances for a new village called Lewiston after his eldest son, Lewis, the future 5th Earl of Seafield. In 1803, because of water supply problems and the unsightly appearance of the 30 houses, school and smiddy, it was decided to relocate the village to its present site by the river Coilty.
