= Eas Mòr, lower =

Coordinates: 55.60946°N 6.32864°W

Eas Mor (lower) is a waterfall on the Abhainn Ghil on the island of Islay, in Scotland. It lies on the west coast of The Oa peninsula north of Lower Killeyan.

== See also ==
- Waterfalls of Scotland
