= Eas Mòr, Glen Brittle =

Coordinates: 57.20984°N 6.29251°W

Eas Mòr
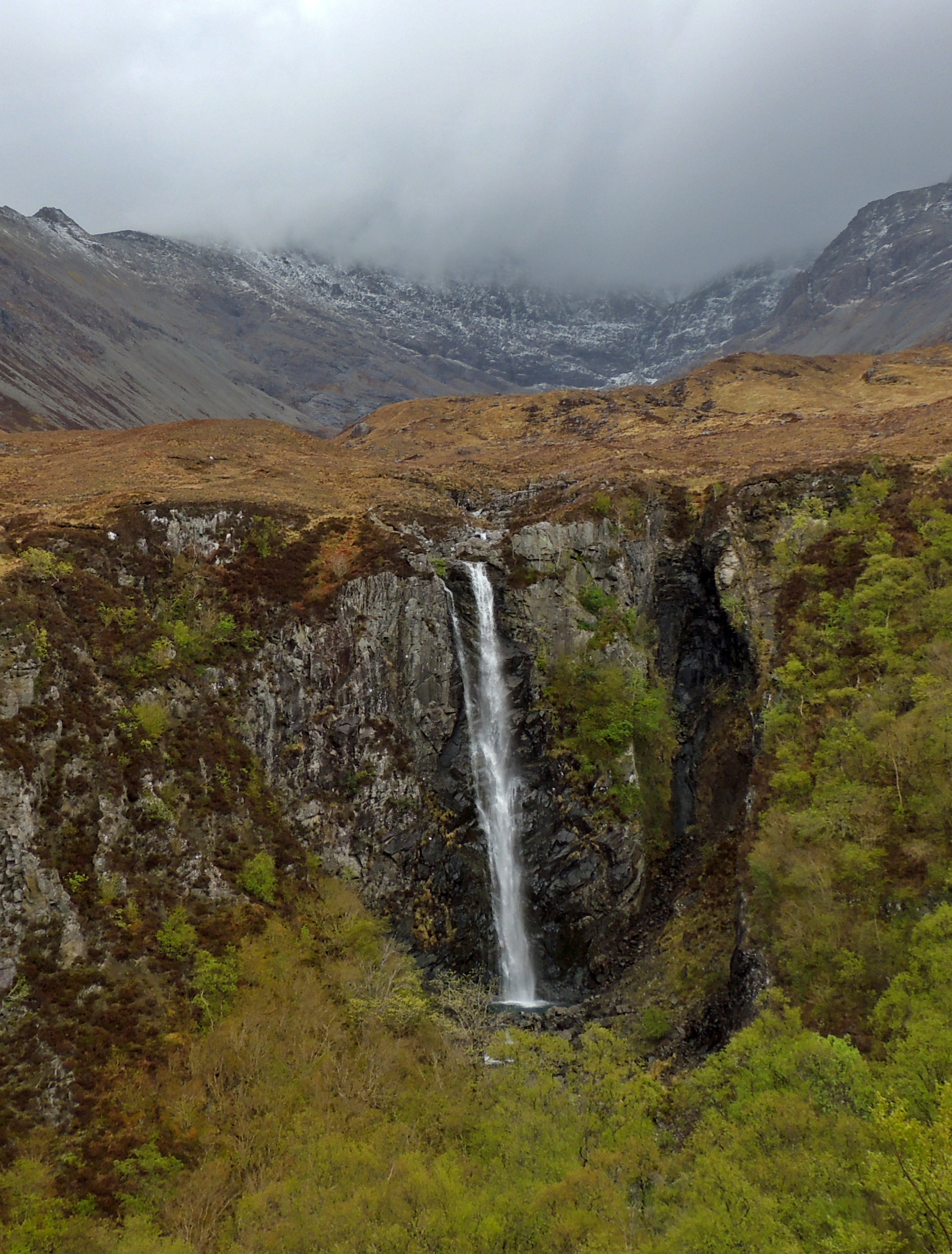
- Eas Mòr
- Interactive map of Eas Mòr
- Location: Glen Brittle, Scotland
- Total height: 47 metres (154 ft)
- Watercourse: Allt Coire na Bannachdich

Eas Mòr is a waterfall in Glen Brittle on the island of Skye in Scotland. It lies on the Allt Coire na Bannachdich in a small gorge east of Glenbrittle House.

== See also ==
- Waterfalls of Scotland
