= Glenartney =

Coordinates: 56°20′N 4°4′W

Glen Artney or Glenartney is a valley in Perthshire, Scotland.

Several ships have been named Glenartney:

- SS Glenartney (1869), an iron-hulled steamship launched in 1869 and wrecked in 1881
- SS Glenartney (1873), an iron-hulled steamship launched in 1874 and scrapped in 1893
- SS Glenartney (1911), a steel-hulled steamship launched in 1911 and sunk by enemy action in 1915
- MV Glenartney (1915), a steel-hulled motor ship launched in 1915 and sunk by enemy action in 1918
- MV Glenartney (1939), a steel-hulled motor ship launched in 1939 and scrapped in 1967
