= Eas Mòr, upper =

Coordinates: 55.60750°N 6.30777°W

Eas Mor is a waterfall is a waterfall on the Abhainn Ghil on the island of Islay in Scotland. It lies on The Oa peninsula south of Giol and west of Lenavore.

== See also ==
- Waterfalls of Scotland
