= Torboll Fall =

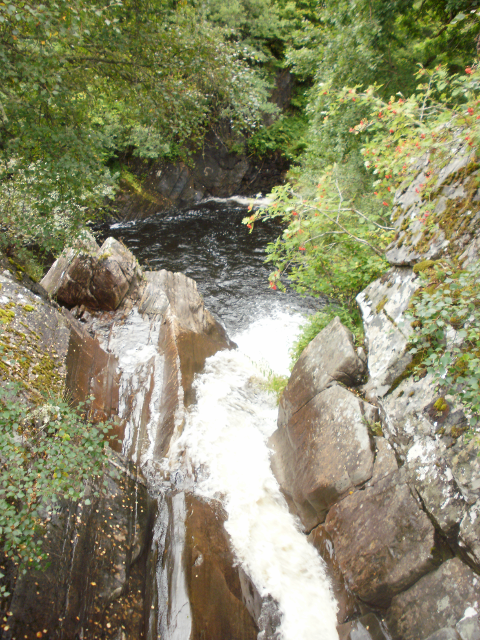
- Torboll Fall
- Interactive map of Torboll Fall
- Location: Golspie, Highland, Scotland
- Type: Ledge
- Watercourse: Abhainn an t-Sratha Charnaig

Torboll Fall is a waterfall near Golspie in the Scottish Highlands. It is also located in species-rich deciduous woodland known as the Torboll Woods Site of Special Scientific Interest. Its grid reference number is NH744985. A fish ladder is parallel to the waterfall to allow for the migration of fish. The waterfall may be viewed from the bottom of the fish ladder or from a bridge that runs over the top of the waterfall.

== Gallery ==
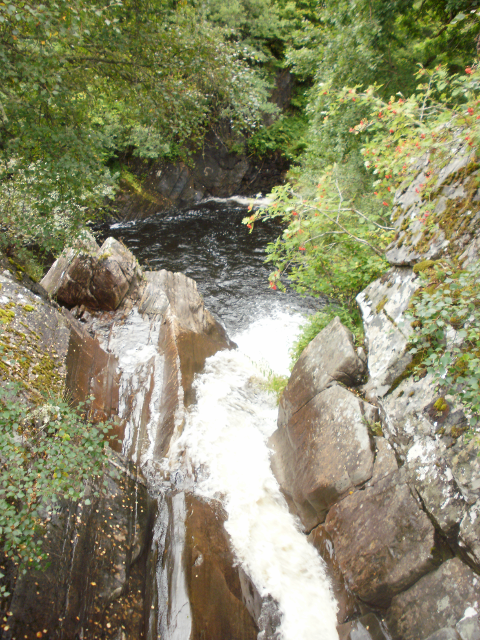
Torboll Fall

== See also ==
- List of waterfalls
