= Eas Mòr, Duirinish =

Eas Mòr
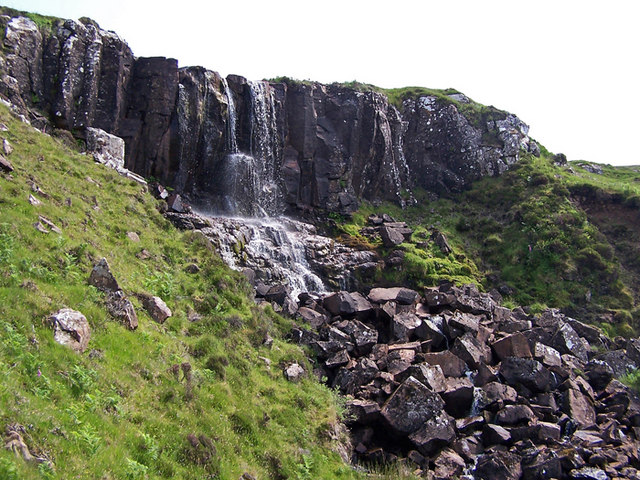
- Eas Mòr

- Location within Scotland
- Location: Skye, Scotland
- Coordinates: 57.37640°N 6.64167°W
- Watercourse: Allt Mhicheil

Eas Mòr is a waterfall on the Duirinish peninsula of the island of Skye in Scotland. It lies on the Allt Mhicheil, a tributary of the Dibidal River below Healabhal Bheag. The area is uninhabited and there is a second fall where the Dibidal River flows into the sea at Geodha Mòr north of MacLeod's Maidens.

The name Eas Mòr is from the Gaelic language and means simply "big waterfall".

== See also ==
- Waterfalls of Scotland
