= Victoria Falls, Wester Ross =

Coordinates: 57.68035°N 5.53232°W

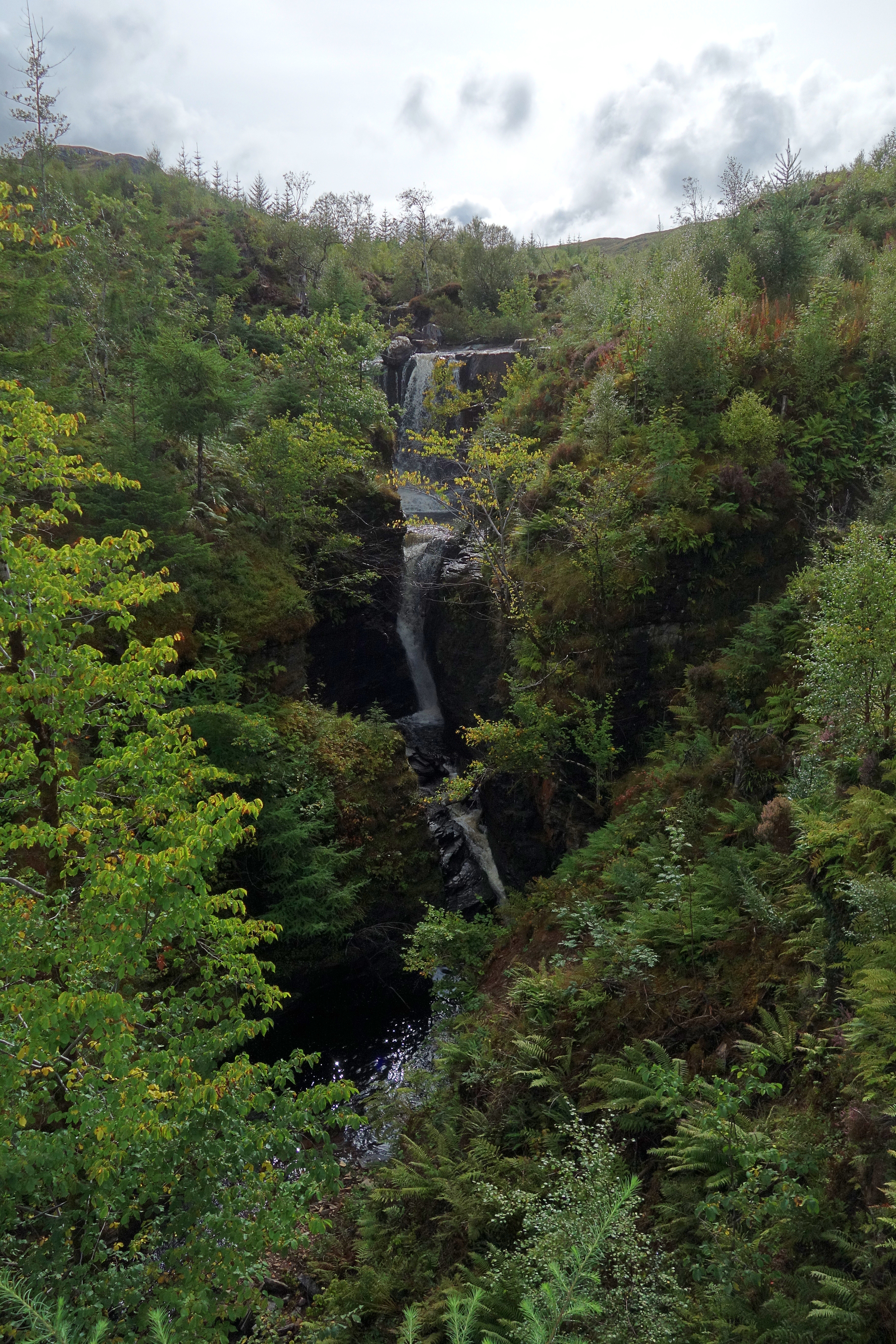
Victoria Falls

Victoria Falls is a waterfall on the southern side of Loch Maree in Wester Ross in the north-west of Scotland. It is on the Abhainn Garbhaig, a short river that flows from Loch Garbhaig to Loch Maree. The falls are within Slattadale Forest, owned by Forestry and Land Scotland. There is a waymarked path to the falls.

The falls are named after Queen Victoria, who visited the area in 1877.

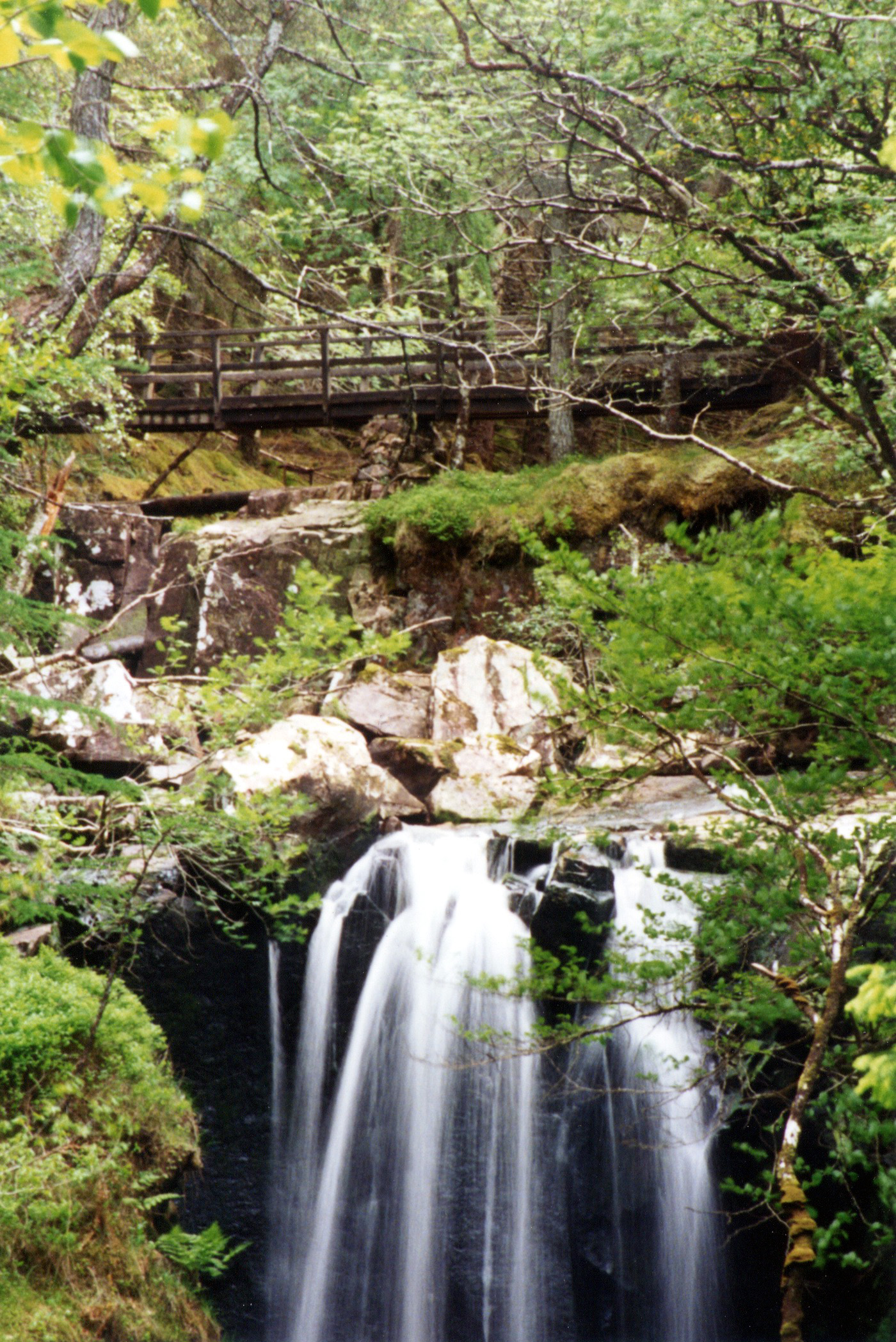
Footbridge above the falls

== See also ==
- Waterfalls of Scotland
