= River Muick =

River in Aberdeenshire, Scotland

Coordinates: 57°02′N 3°03′W

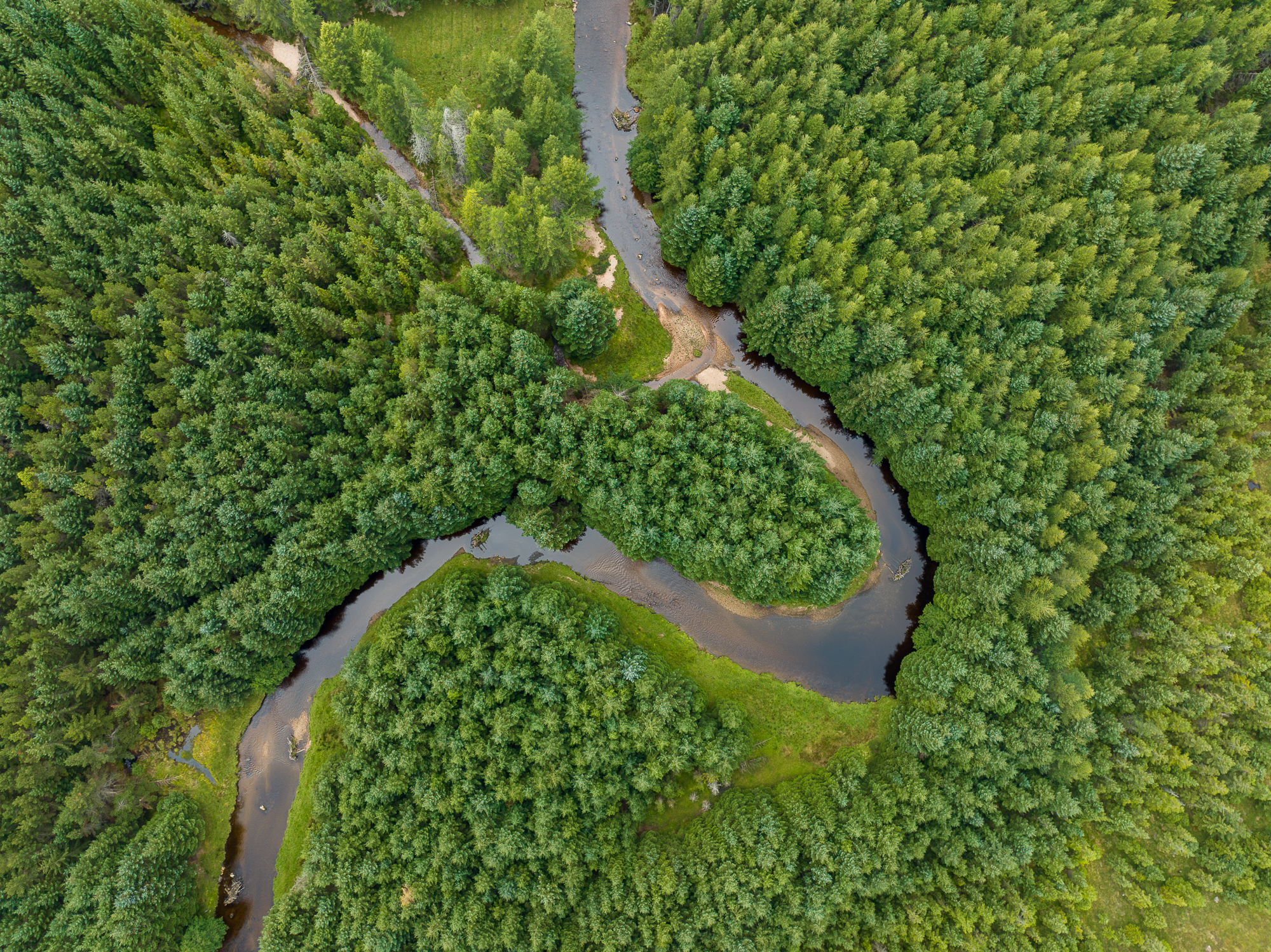
View of the River Muick in the Cairngorms National Park.

River Muick (/mɪk/) is a river of the Grampian Mountains of Aberdeenshire, Scotland. A tributary of the River Dee, it flows for about 6 kilometres (3.7 mi) from the southeastern hill area around Lochnagar into Loch Muick on Balmoral Estate.

It has a catchment area of 110 square kilometres (42 sq mi). The river is described as meandering "tightly across the wide valley floor, filled with glacial deposit which has been partly worked flat by the river".

The river is inhabited by salmon. In the mid 19th century specimens of Melampyrum sylvaticum and Hieracium boreale were collected along the banks.
