= Tomich (village) =

Model village in Highland, Scotland

Coordinates: 57°18′N 4°48′W

Tomich (Scottish Gaelic: Tomaich) is a Victorian model village and is a conservation area situated in the Highlands at the western end of Strathglass, approximately 30 miles from Inverness.

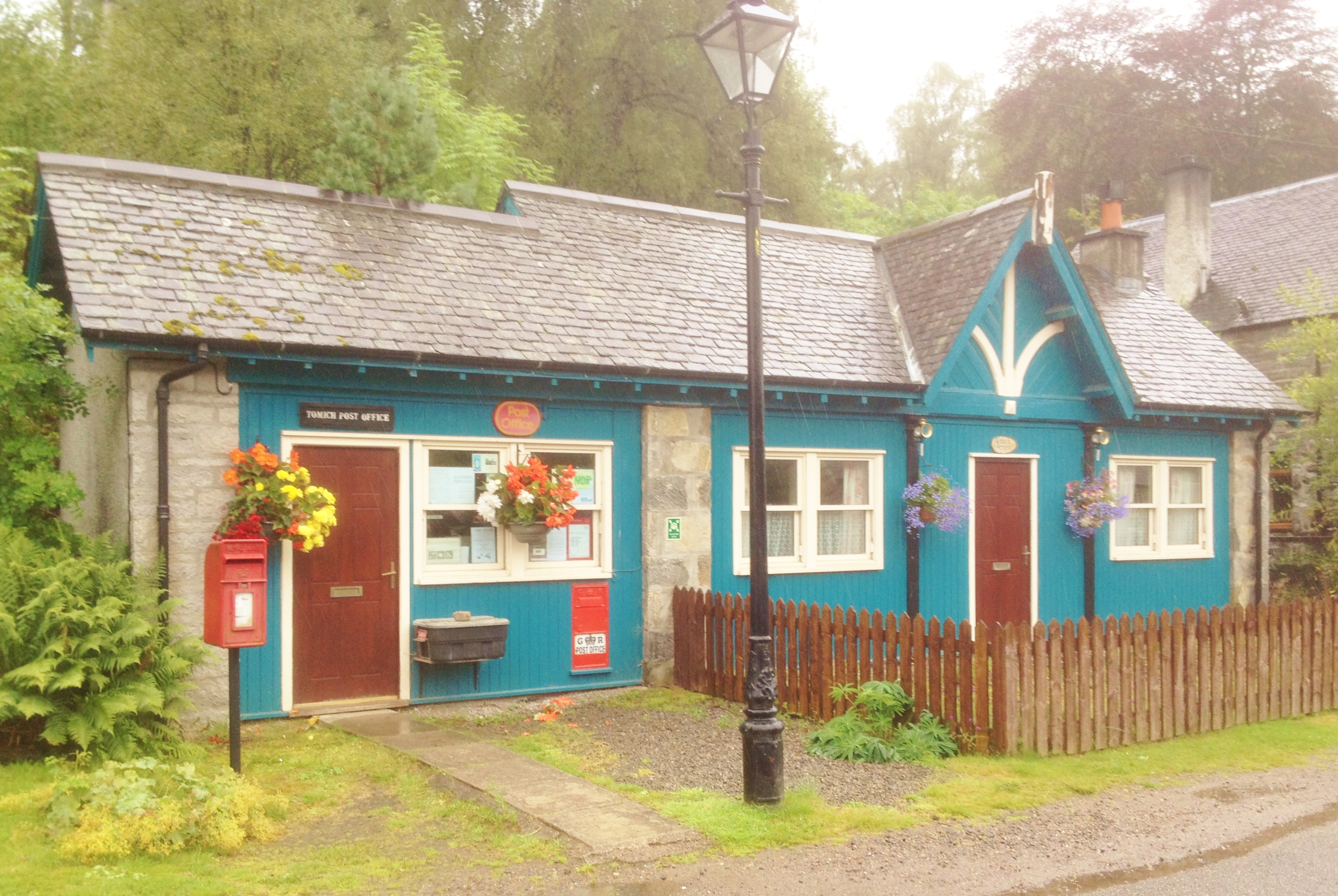
Tomich post office in 2014

The village of Tomich consists of privately owned properties that were originally created to serve Guisachan House, which is now derelict but under stabilization. Much of the history and rare flora and fauna of the area remains and is very much enjoyed still today.

Because of its inspiring scenery and history, the area is used for worldwide recognised events. These include worldwide Retriever gatherings, World Orienteering Championships and others.

The Golden Retriever was first bred in Guisachan, an historic settlement adjacent to the village of Tomich, near the now ruinous mansion by Dudley Marjoribanks, 1st Baron Tweedmouth. A statue to commemorate the breed's founding was erected in August 2014 by Friends of Guisachan, a US-based organisation of golden retriever lovers.

Tomich and the surrounding area are a popular holiday destination, being located in what is considered to be one of the most beautiful parts of the Highlands. Amenities in Tomich include a small country house hotel and a post office.
