= London Borough of Richmond upon Thames =

- London borough
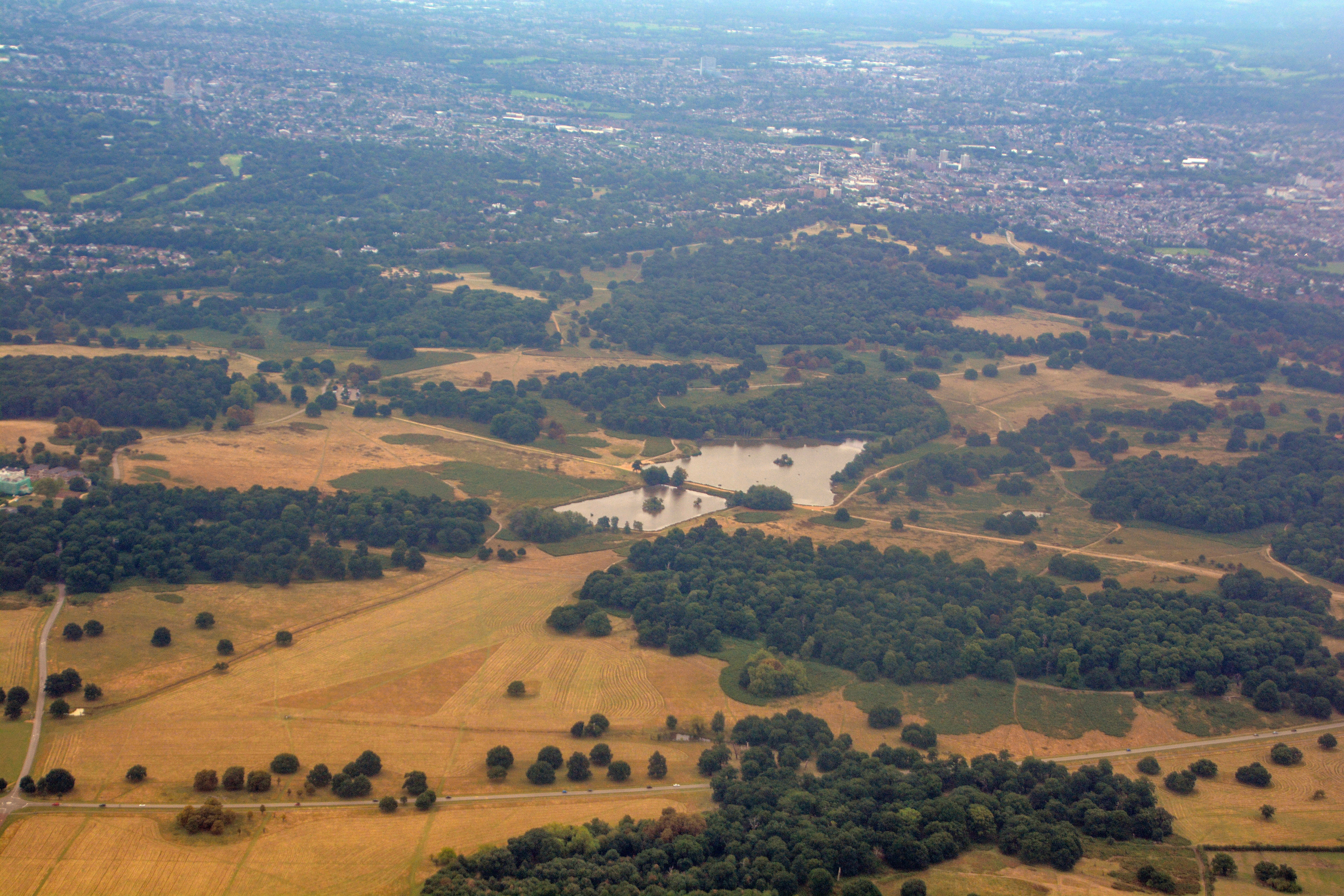
- Richmond Park and the wider Richmond upon Thames area, from above

- Coat of arms Council logo

- Richmond upon Thames shown within Greater London
- Coordinates: 51°25′N 0°20′W
- Sovereign state: United Kingdom
- Constituent country: England
- Region: London
- Ceremonial county: Greater London
- Created: 1 April 1965
- Admin HQ: Twickenham

Government
  - Type: London borough council
  - Body: Richmond upon Thames London Borough Council
  - London Assembly: Gareth Roberts (LD)
  - MPs: Munira Wilson (LD); Sarah Olney (LD); Ruth Cadbury (L)

Area
  - Total: 22.17 sq mi (57.41 km^{2})
  - Rank: 235th (of 296)

Population (2025)
  - Total: 196,713
  - Rank: 104th (of 296)
  - Density: 8,874/sq mi (3,426/km^{2})

Ethnicity (2021)
  - Ethnic groups: List: 80.5% White; 63.0% White British; 8.9% Asian; 5.5% Mixed; 3.3% Other; 1.9% Black

Religion (2021)
  - Religion: List: 45.3% Christianity; 37.9 no religion; 7.1% not stated; 4.3% Muslim; 2.1% Hinduism; 1.0% Sikhism; 0.8% Buddhism; 0.7% other; 0.6% Judaism
- Time zone: UTC (GMT)
  - Summer (DST): UTC+1 (BST)
- Postcodes: TW, SW, KT
- ISO 3166 code: GB-RIC
- ONS code: 00BD
- GSS code: E09000027
- Police: Metropolitan Police
- Website: www.richmond.gov.uk

The London Borough of Richmond upon Thames is an Outer London borough formed in 1965 from the merger of three older boroughs. These were the Municipal Borough of Richmond and the Municipal Borough of Barnes, situated south of the Thames which was, until 1965, part of Surrey, and the Municipal Borough of Twickenham on the northern, Middlesex bank of the Thames. In this way it is the only London borough to straddle the River Thames.

The population is 198,019 and the major communities are Barnes, East Sheen, Mortlake, Kew, Richmond, Twickenham, Teddington and Hampton.

The borough includes Richmond Park, the largest park in London, along with the National Physical Laboratory and The National Archives. Kew Gardens, Hampton Court Palace, Twickenham Stadium and the WWT London Wetlands Centre are within its boundaries and draw domestic and international tourism. In 2023 the borough was ranked first in Rightmove's Happy at Home index, making it the "happiest place to live in Great Britain"; the first time a London borough had taken the top spot. In 2026, it returned to first place in the rankings.

== History ==
The London Borough of Richmond upon Thames was established in 1965 as a result of the London Government Act 1963. The new borough was created by the merger of three boroughs. These were the Municipal Borough of Richmond and the Municipal Borough of Barnes, situated south of the Thames which was, until 1965, part of Surrey; and the Municipal Borough of Twickenham on the northern, Middlesex bank of the Thames. In this way it is the only London borough to straddle the River Thames.

The Municipal Borough of Richmond was created in 1890. It was enlarged in 1892 to include Kew, Petersham and North Sheen, and again in 1933 to include Ham. The Municipal Borough of Barnes was established in 1894 and the Municipal Borough of Twickenham in 1926.

The area of these three boroughs was transferred to the new Greater London, to become one of its 32 London boroughs. The larger new borough was named "Richmond upon Thames" rather than just Richmond as the old borough had been. Minor boundary changes have occurred since its creation. The most significant amendments were made in 1994 and 1995, when areas of Richmond Park were transferred from the London Borough of Wandsworth and the Royal Borough of Kingston upon Thames.

== Geography ==
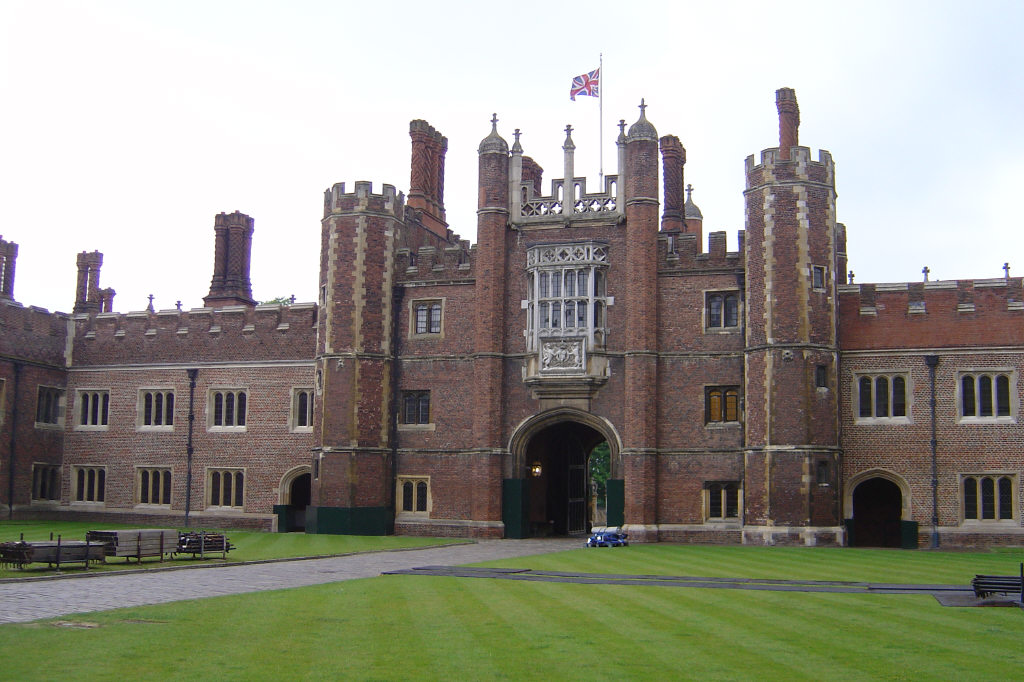
Hampton Court Palace

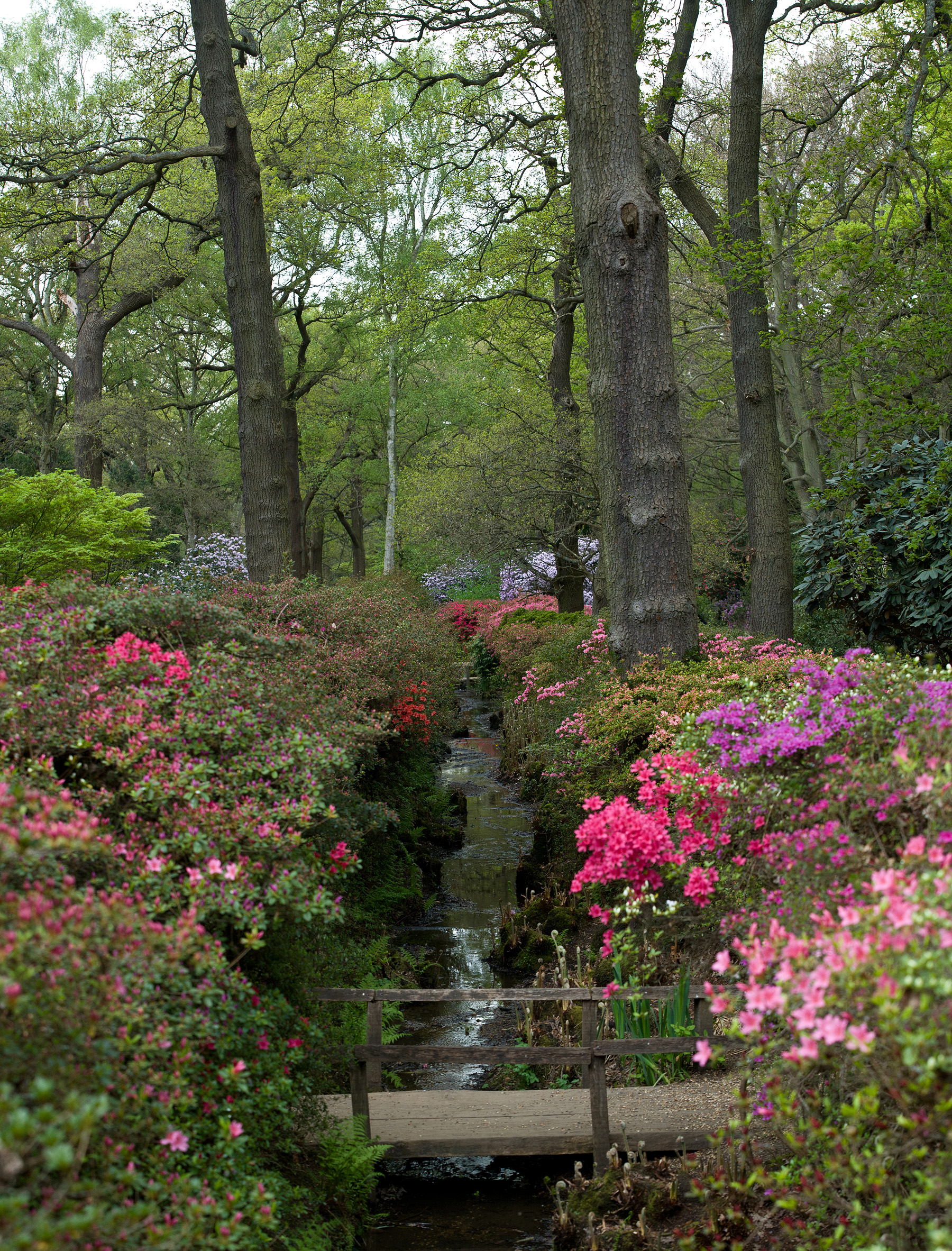
Isabella Plantation, Richmond Park

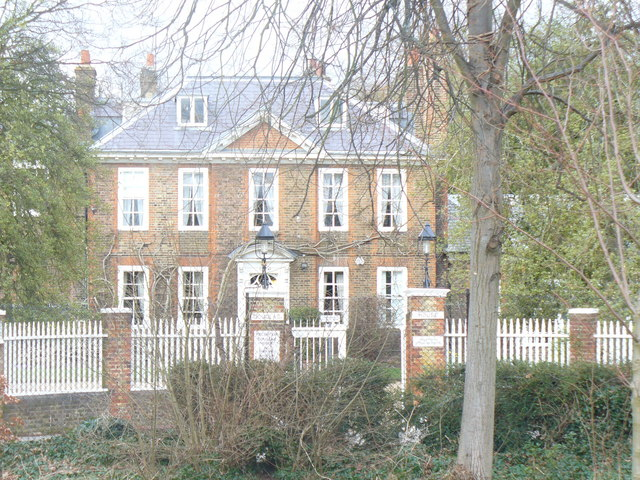
Douglas House in Petersham, which houses the German School London

The borough is approximately half parkland, with notable parks including Richmond Park, Bushy Park, Kew Gardens, Old Deer Park and Hampton Court Park. There are over 100 parks and open spaces in the borough and 21 miles (34 km) of river frontage. 140 hectares within the borough are designated as part of the Metropolitan Green Belt.

The predominant other land use is residential, with most businesses within the borough consisting of retail, property improvement/development and professional services. Parts of the borough, including Barnes, Richmond, St Margarets, Cambridge Park and Marble Hill, some areas of Twickenham and much of East Sheen, rival Stanmore Hill and Kenley as the highest house-price districts and neighbourhoods in Outer London.

The borough is home to the National Physical Laboratory and to Hampton Court Palace, Twickenham Stadium and the WWT London Wetlands Centre, which draw domestic and international tourism.

The River Thames becomes narrower than at any part of Inner London towards its flow into the borough and becomes tidal at Teddington Lock in the borough; it flows generally south to north, rather than west to east through more than half of the borough.

London's German business and expatriate community is centred on this borough, which houses the German School London (DSL) and most of the capital's German expatriates.

=== Climate ===
Climate data for Kew Gardens (1991–2020)
Month	Jan	Feb	Mar	Apr	May	Jun	Jul	Aug	Sep	Oct	Nov	Dec	Year
Mean daily maximum °C (°F)	8.6 (47.5)	9.2 (48.6)	11.9 (53.4)	15.1 (59.2)	18.4 (65.1)	21.4 (70.5)	23.8 (74.8)	23.4 (74.1)	20.3 (68.5)	16.0 (60.8)	11.6 (52.9)	8.9 (48.0)	15.7 (60.3)
Mean daily minimum °C (°F)	2.0 (35.6)	2.0 (35.6)	3.5 (38.3)	5.1 (41.2)	8.2 (46.8)	11.0 (51.8)	13.2 (55.8)	13.0 (55.4)	10.5 (50.9)	7.8 (46.0)	4.3 (39.7)	2.3 (36.1)	6.9 (44.4)
Average rainfall mm (inches)	59.9 (2.36)	45.4 (1.79)	39.0 (1.54)	43.6 (1.72)	44.6 (1.76)	49.7 (1.96)	45.2 (1.78)	55.1 (2.17)	51.9 (2.04)	67.9 (2.67)	66.0 (2.60)	59.2 (2.33)	627.5 (24.70)
Average rainy days (≥ 1 mm)	11.8	9.9	8.9	8.6	8.3	8.5	7.6	8.4	8.4	10.9	11.3	11.2	113.8
Mean monthly sunshine hours	60.2	80.7	128.0	181.0	213.4	209.8	221.9	206.5	152.0	117.4	69.7	52.7	1,693.2
Source: Met Office

=== List of neighbourhoods ===
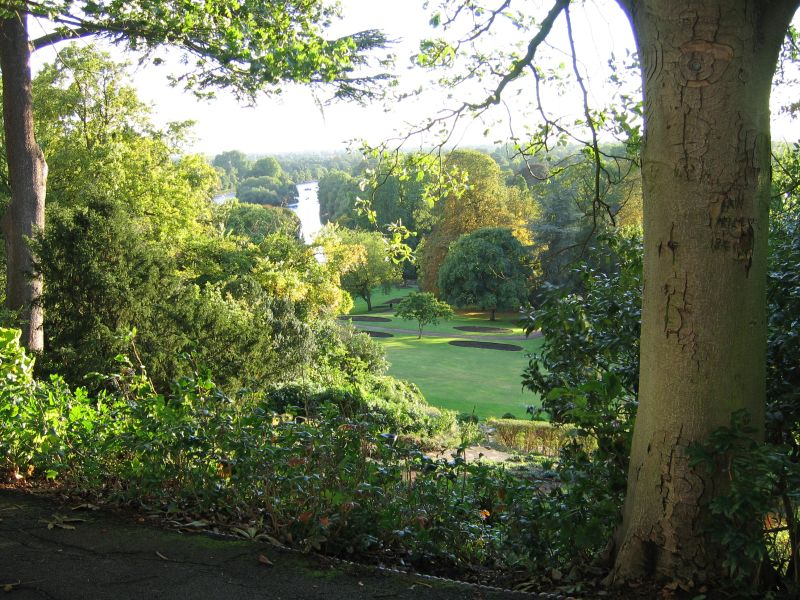
A view from Richmond Hill over the Terrace Gardens

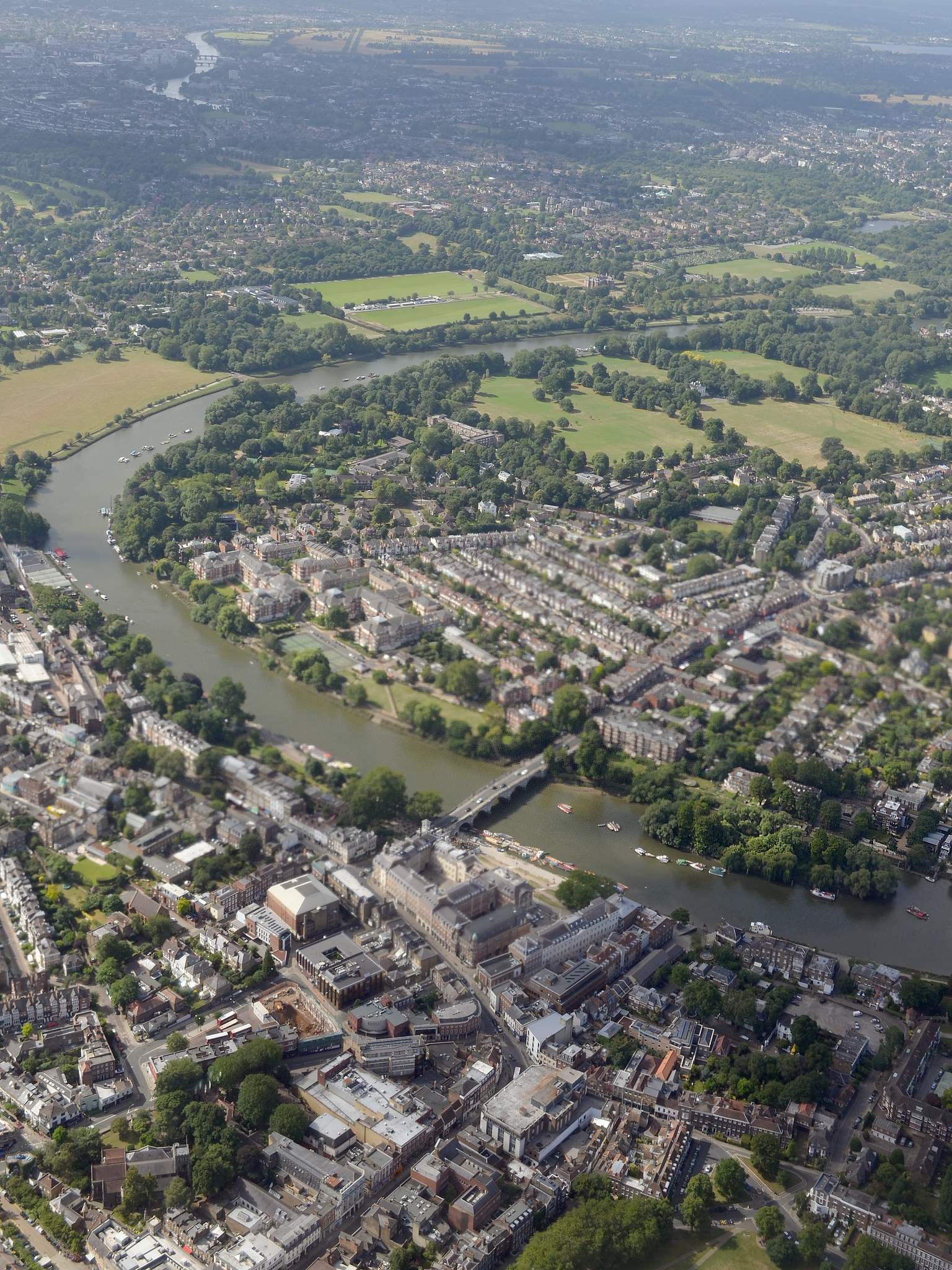
Aerial view of Richmond and East Twickenham from the north, August 2015

The local authority divides the borough into fourteen loosely bounded neighbourhoods, or "villages". Some neighbourhoods have the same name as their associated borough council ward, but the boundaries are not officially aligned. There is also no direct alignment between these areas and postcode districts, which tend to cover much broader areas, crossing the borough boundaries. There are four post towns based in the borough: Hampton, Richmond, Teddington and Twickenham. Parts of the borough come under the London post town, including Barnes and Mortlake, and there are several other peripheral parts of post towns based in neighbouring boroughs which straddle the administrative boundary. Although most addresses in the borough have TW postcodes, some have SW and KT postcodes.

Neighbourhood or "village"	Associated postal districts	Associated council wards	Sub-areas
Barnes	London SW13	Barnes; Mortlake and Barnes Common	Castelnau, Barnes Common, Barnes Bridge, Barnes Village
East Sheen	London SW14, London SW15, Richmond TW10	East Sheen	Richmond Park
Ham and Petersham	Kingston KT2, Richmond TW10	Ham, Petersham and Richmond Riverside	Ham, Petersham
Hampton	Hampton TW12, East Molesey KT8	Hampton; Hampton North	
Hampton Hill	Teddington TW11, Hampton TW12	Fulwell and Hampton Hill	Fulwell
Hampton Wick	Kingston KT1, Teddington TW11	Hampton Wick	
Kew	Richmond TW9, Richmond TW10, London SW14	Kew	Kew Green, Kew Bridge
Mortlake	London SW15, London SW14	Mortlake and Barnes Common	Chiswick Bridge
North Twickenham and East Whitton	Twickenham TW1, Twickenham TW2, Hounslow TW3	St Margarets and North Twickenham; Whitton	Cole Park, Stadium Village
Richmond and Richmond Hill	Richmond TW9, Richmond TW10	South Richmond; North Richmond	
Strawberry Hill	Twickenham TW1	South Twickenham; Teddington	
St Margarets and East Twickenham	Twickenham TW1, Twickenham TW2, Isleworth TW7	St Margarets	St Margarets
Teddington	Teddington, TW11	Teddington	Fulwell
Twickenham	Twickenham TW1, Twickenham TW2	Twickenham Riverside; South Twickenham; West Twickenham	Twickenham Green, Fulwell
Whitton and Heathfield	Twickenham TW2, Whitton, Hounslow TW3 & TW4, Isleworth TW7	Whitton; Heathfield	Whitton, Heathfield

== Governance ==
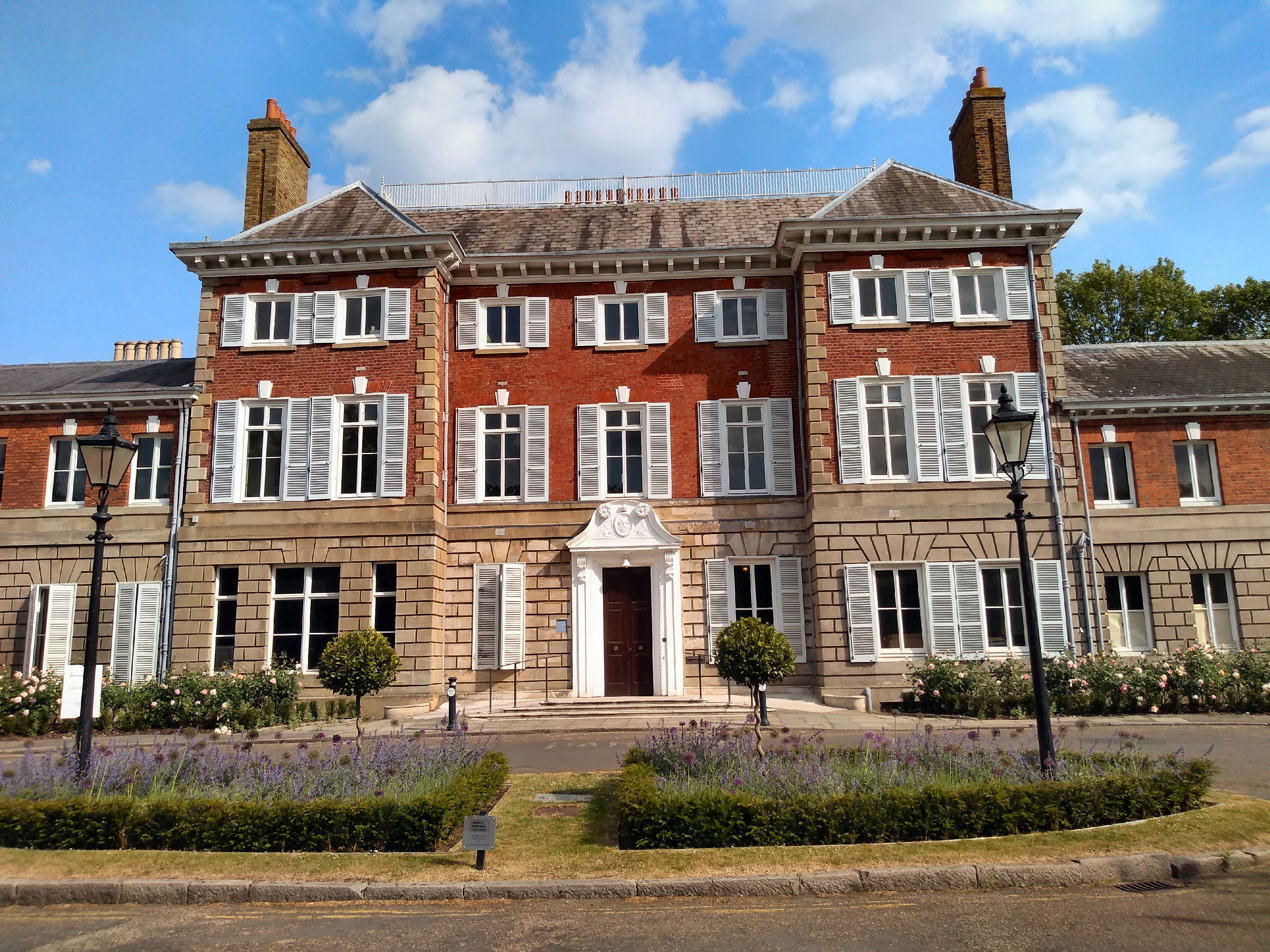
York House, Twickenham: the Council's meeting place

The council meets at York House in Twickenham; its main offices are at the adjoining Civic Centre at 44 York Street.

=== Greater London representation ===
Since 2000, for elections to the London Assembly, the borough forms part of the South West constituency, represented since 2024 by the AM Gareth Roberts.

=== Parliamentary representation ===
The borough is split between three constituencies. The entire portion of the borough south of the River Thames is included in the Richmond Park constituency, which also contains some of the northern wards of the borough of Kingston.

Most of the portion of the borough north of the river forms the constituency of Twickenham, which does not contain wards from any other borough. However, since the 2024 general election, the borough's northernmost ward on this side of the Thames, Whitton, has instead been included in the constituency of Brentford and Isleworth, the remainder of which consists of wards from the London Borough of Hounslow.

Prior to the 2024 election, all of the borough north of the Thames had formed the entirety of the Twickenham constituency since 1997.

Constituency	Member of Parliament	Political affiliation	Elected
Richmond Park	Sarah Olney	Liberal Democrats	2019
Twickenham	Munira Wilson	Liberal Democrats	2019
Brentford and Isleworth	Ruth Cadbury	Labour Party	2015

== Demography ==
Population pyramid of the Borough of Richmond upon Thames

Population census
Year	Pop.	±%
1801	14,560	—
1811	16,748	+15.0%
1821	19,908	+18.9%
1831	22,752	+14.3%
1841	25,224	+10.9%
1851	28,769	+14.1%
1861	40,194	+39.7%
1871	51,619	+28.4%
1881	63,045	+22.1%
1891	79,854	+26.7%
1901	103,720	+29.9%
1911	134,729	+29.9%
1921	152,968	+13.5%
1931	173,683	+13.5%
1941	187,420	+7.9%
1951	202,246	+7.9%
1961	187,923	−7.1%
1971	174,640	−7.1%
1981	157,298	−9.9%
1991	164,235	+4.4%
2001	172,327	+4.9%
2011	186,990	+8.5%
2021	195,200	+4.4%
2024 estimate	196,678	+0.8%
Note: 2024 estimate

In 2006, research commissioned by a major mortgage lender found that, on the quantitative statistical indices used, the borough had the best quality of life in London and was in the top quarter of local authorities nationwide. A neighbouring authority in Surrey achieved the best quality of life in that report.

Richmond is one of London's wealthiest boroughs on many measures. It has the lowest rates of poverty, child poverty, low pay, child obesity and adults without level 3 qualifications of any London borough, according to a 2017 research project by Trust for London and the New Policy Institute.

Demography is a diverse picture as in all of London: each district should be looked at separately and even those do not reflect all neighbourhoods. Whatever generalisations are used, "the fine-grained texture of London poverty" by its minutely localised geography must always be taken into account according to an influential poverty report of 2010. Richmond upon Thames has the lowest child poverty rates in London at 20% and contains at least one ward with an above-average level (for London) of working-age adults receiving out-of-work benefits but even this borough – reflecting the best result – has two standard poverty indices of sixteen in which it is placed in the worst quarter of boroughs.

=== Ethnicity ===
Ethnic group	Year											
Ethnic group	1971 estimations		1981 estimations		1991 census		2001 census		2011 census		2021 census	
Ethnic group	Number	%	Number	%	Number	%	Number	%	Number	%	Number	%
White: Total	–	97.8%	148,135	95.5%	151,919	94.5%	156,785	91%	160,725	85.5%	157,111	80.4%
White: British	–	–	–	–	–	–	135,665	78.8%	133,582	71.4%	123,093	63.0%
White: Irish	–	–	–	–	–	–	4,805	%	4,766	2.5%	4,866	2.5%
White: Gypsy or Irish Traveller	–	–	–	–	–	–	–	–	95	0.05%	85	0.0%
White: Roma	–	–	–	–	–	–	–	–	–	–	400	0.2%
White: Other	–	–	–	–	–	–	16,325	9.5%	22,282	11.9%	28,667	14.7%
Black or Black British: Total	–	–	–	–	1,221	0.75%	1,614	0.93%	2,816	1.3%	3,687	2%
Black or Black British: African	–	–	–	–	355		829	%	1,643	0.8%	2,260	1.2%
Black or Black British: Caribbean	–	–	–	–	553		643	%	840	0.4%	936	0.5%
Black or Black British: Other Black	–	–	–	–	313		124	%	333	0.1%	491	0.3%
Asian or Asian British: Total	–	–	–	–	5,711	3.5%	7,968	4.6%	13,607	7.0%	17,467	9%
Asian or Asian British: Indian	–	–	–	–	2622	1.63%	4,232	%	5,202	2.7%	7236	3.7%
Asian or Asian British: Pakistani	–	–	–	–	353		664	%	1,163	0.6%	1749	0.9%
Asian or Asian British: Bangladeshi	–	–	–	–	322		662	%	867	0.4%	916	0.5%
Asian or Asian British: Chinese	–	–	–	–	866		1,299	%	1,753	0.9%	2777	1.4%
Asian or Asian British: Other Asian	–	–	–	–	1548	0.96%	1,151	%	4,622	2.4%	4789	2.5%
Mixed or British Mixed: Total	–	–	–	–	–	–	3,797	2.2%	6,780	3.4%	10,662	5.4%
Mixed: White and Black Caribbean	–	–	–	–	–	–	670	%	1,250	0.6%	1654	0.8%
Mixed: White and Black African	–	–	–	–	–	–	443	%	731	0.3%	1205	0.6%
Mixed: White and Asian	–	–	–	–	–	–	1,530	%	2,857	1.5%	4238	2.2%
Mixed: Other Mixed	–	–	–	–	–	–	1,154	%	1,942	1.0%	3565	1.8%
Other: Total	–	–	–	–	1881	1.17%	2,171	1.25%	3,062	1.6%	6,350	3.3%
Other: Arab	–	–	–	–	–	–	–	–	1,172	0.6%	1,721	0.9%
Other: Any other ethnic group	–	–	–	–	1881	1.17%	2,171	1.25%	1,890	1.0%	4,629	2.4%
Ethnic minority: Total	–	2.2%	7,026	4.5%	8,813	5.42%	15,550	9%	26,265	14.2%	38,166	19.6%
Total	–	100%	155,161	100%	160,732	100%	172,335	100.00%	186,990	100.00%	195,277	100%

=== Immigration ===
This list includes top-15 sources of immigration to Borough of Richmond upon Thames for the 2021 Census:

#	Country	Number
1	India	3,292
2	United States	2,841
3	Ireland	2,832
4	South Africa	2,618
5	Poland	2,485
6	Germany	2,106
7	Italy	2,042
8	Australia	1,892
9	Turkey	1,831
10	France	1,440
11	Iran	1,389
12	Spain	1,292
13	Brazil	1,180
14	China	1,025
15	Hong Kong	985

== Coat of arms ==
The borough's history is reflected in the coat of arms, which was officially granted on 7 May 1966. It is: Ermine a portcullis or within a bordure gules charged with eight fleurs-de-lis or. The crest is: On a wreath argent and gules out of a mural crown gules a swan rousant argent in beak a branch of climbing red roses leaved and entwined about the neck proper. The supporters are: On either side a griffin gules, armed and beaked azure, each supporting an oar proper, the blade of the dexter dark blue and that of the sinister light blue.

The portcullis was taken from the arms of the Municipal Borough of Richmond; the swan crest, from the arms of the Municipal Borough of Twickenham; and the griffin supporters and shield from the arms of the Municipal Borough of Barnes. Red, gold and ermine are the royal livery colours, reflecting Richmond's royal history. The swan represents the River Thames, which flows through the borough. The oars are from the Oxford University Boat Club and the Cambridge University Boat Club, reflecting the fact that the Boat Race between the two universities ends at Mortlake in the borough.

== Transport ==
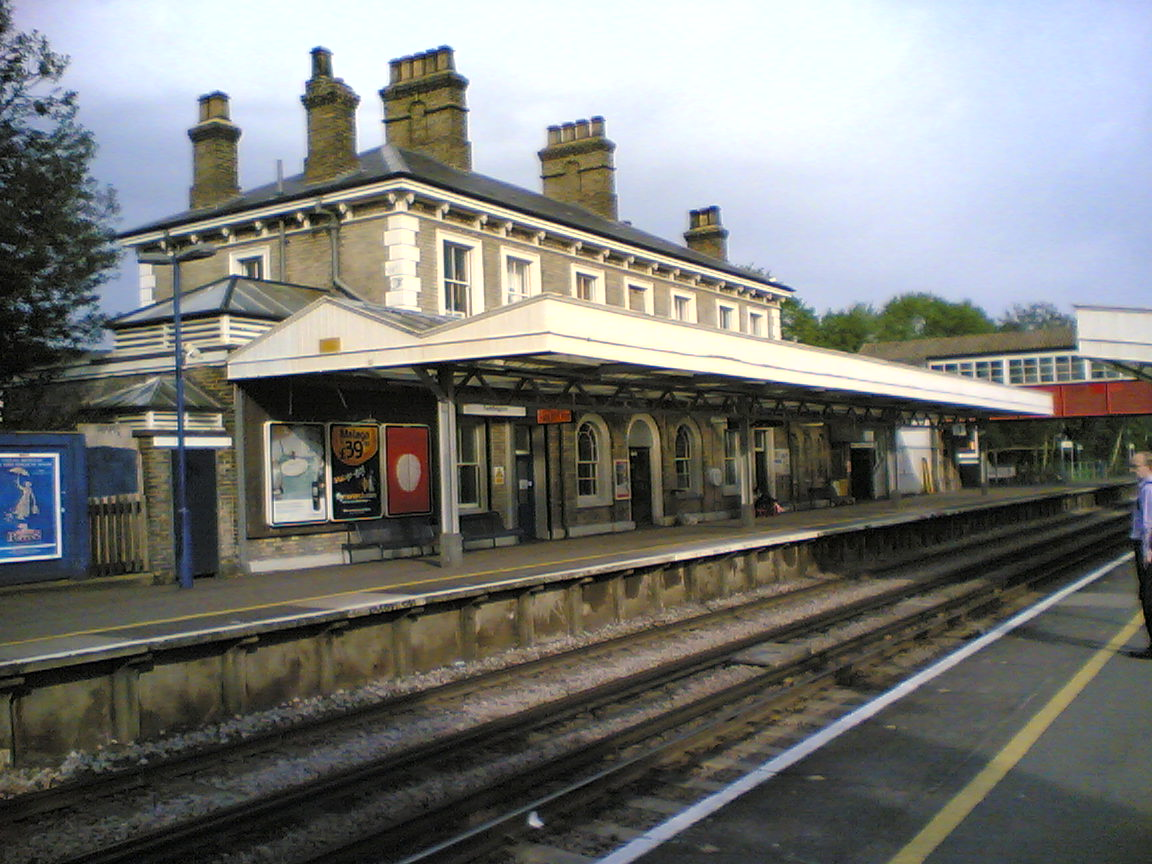
Teddington railway station

=== Aviation ===
London Heathrow Airport is located a short distance west, in the London Borough of Hillingdon.

=== Buses ===
The borough is served by many Transport for London bus routes.

=== Rail services ===
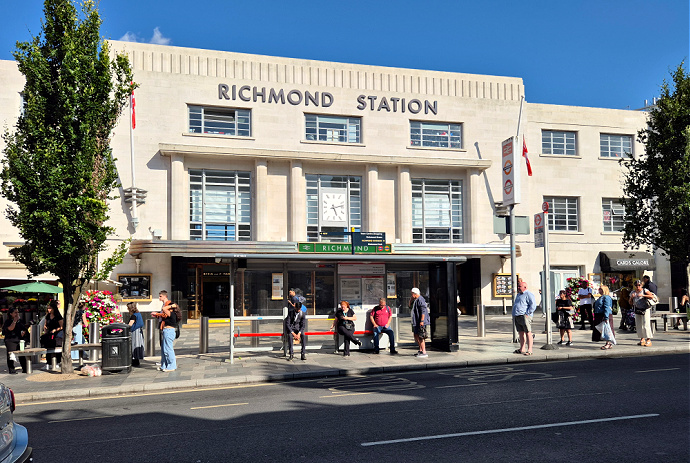
Richmond is a National Rail station on the Waterloo to Reading line. It is also served by the District line of the London Underground and London Overground's Mildmay line.

The borough is connected to central London and Reading by the National Rail services of the South Western Railway.

Richmond upon Thames is not very well served by the London Underground compared with other boroughs in West London. Two stations, served by the District line, are located towards the borough's northeastern end: Richmond and Kew Gardens. Both are also served by London Overground trains on the Mildmay line, which connects Richmond with inner North London before terminating in Stratford. The south-western end of the district, encompassing areas such as Twickenham, is served instead by suburban railway services.

The other stations are: Barnes; Barnes Bridge; Fulwell; Hampton; Hampton Wick; Mortlake; North Sheen; St Margarets; Strawberry Hill; Teddington; Twickenham and Whitton.

== Education ==
Richmond upon Thames is the local education authority for the borough. Richmond upon Thames College opened in 1977 and was the first tertiary college in Greater London. The borough adopted a tertiary post-16 provision with virtually all 16-19 studies taking place at this college. This system lasted until 2012 when the council approved the creation of sixth forms in schools. Additionally the council approved the creation of a new Catholic secondary school in the borough.

== Sport and leisure ==
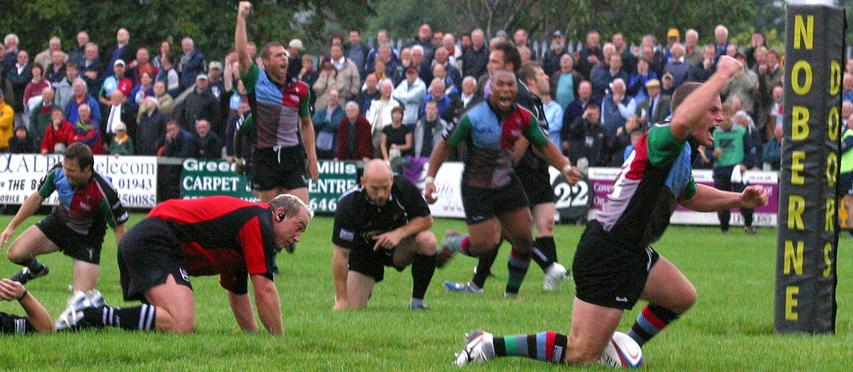
Harlequins during the 2005–2006 season

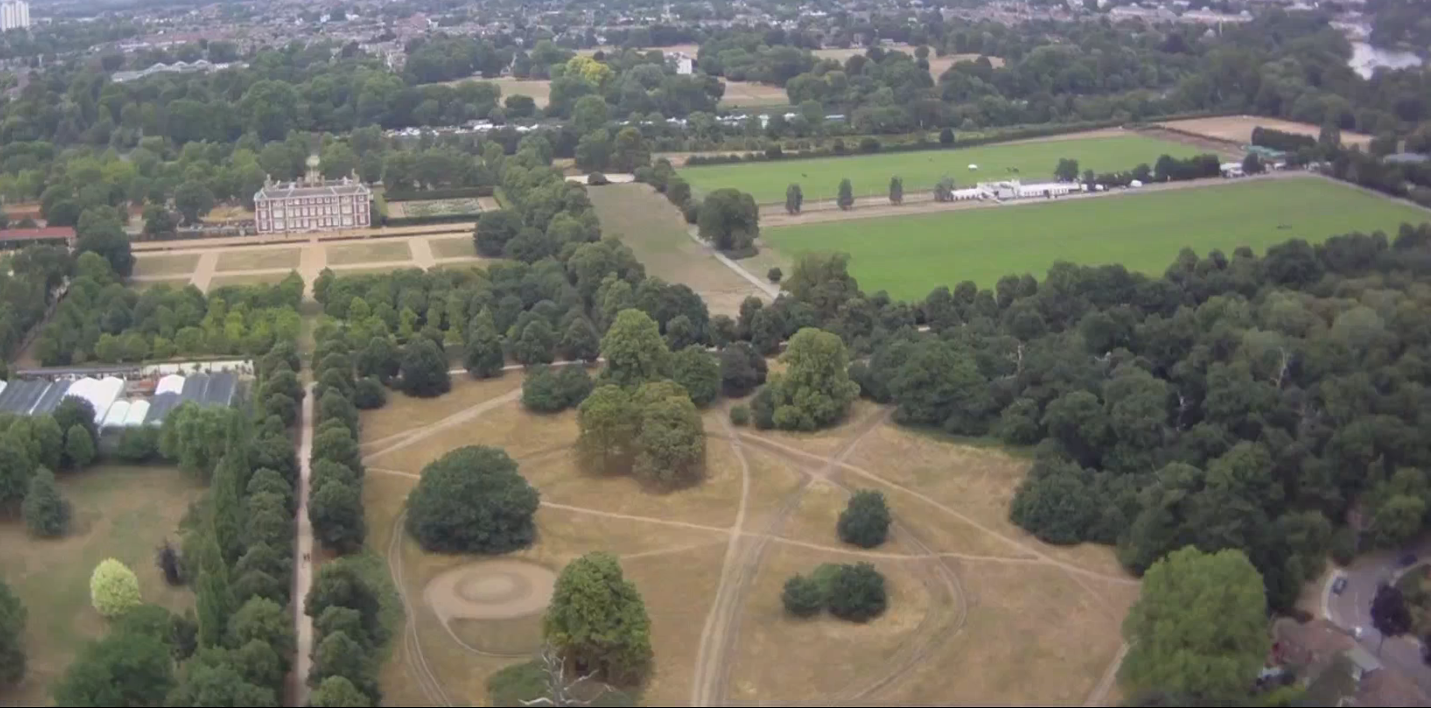
View from a helicopter of Ham House, the River Thames and Ham Polo Club

A.F.C. Richmond, the soccer club that features in Ted Lasso, is fictional but the borough does have a non-League football club, Hampton & Richmond Borough F.C., who play at Beveree Stadium in Hampton.

Twickenham Stadium hosts rugby internationals and the Twickenham Stoop is home to the Harlequins Rugby Team. Richmond Rugby Club is also active and shares its ground with London Scottish F.C. The Richmond Minis is a large youth rugby organisation, whilst the Richmond Heavies organise games for more veteran players.

Cricket is played in many locations around the borough, including Ham Common, Richmond Green and Kew Green.

The River Thames flows through the borough, and a number of sailing and rowing clubs are located along it. Richmond Canoe Club is based a short distance up river from Richmond Bridge

The borough has a large amount of equestrian activity; this includes the Horse Rangers Association and Ham Polo Club.

Richmond's swimming pools, Pools on the Park, are located in Old Deer Park close to the town centre. The outdoor pool is open in the summer months only. There is also a heated outdoor pool in Hampton.

== Arts and culture ==
The Twickenham Museum is a volunteer-run museum opposite St Mary's parish church.

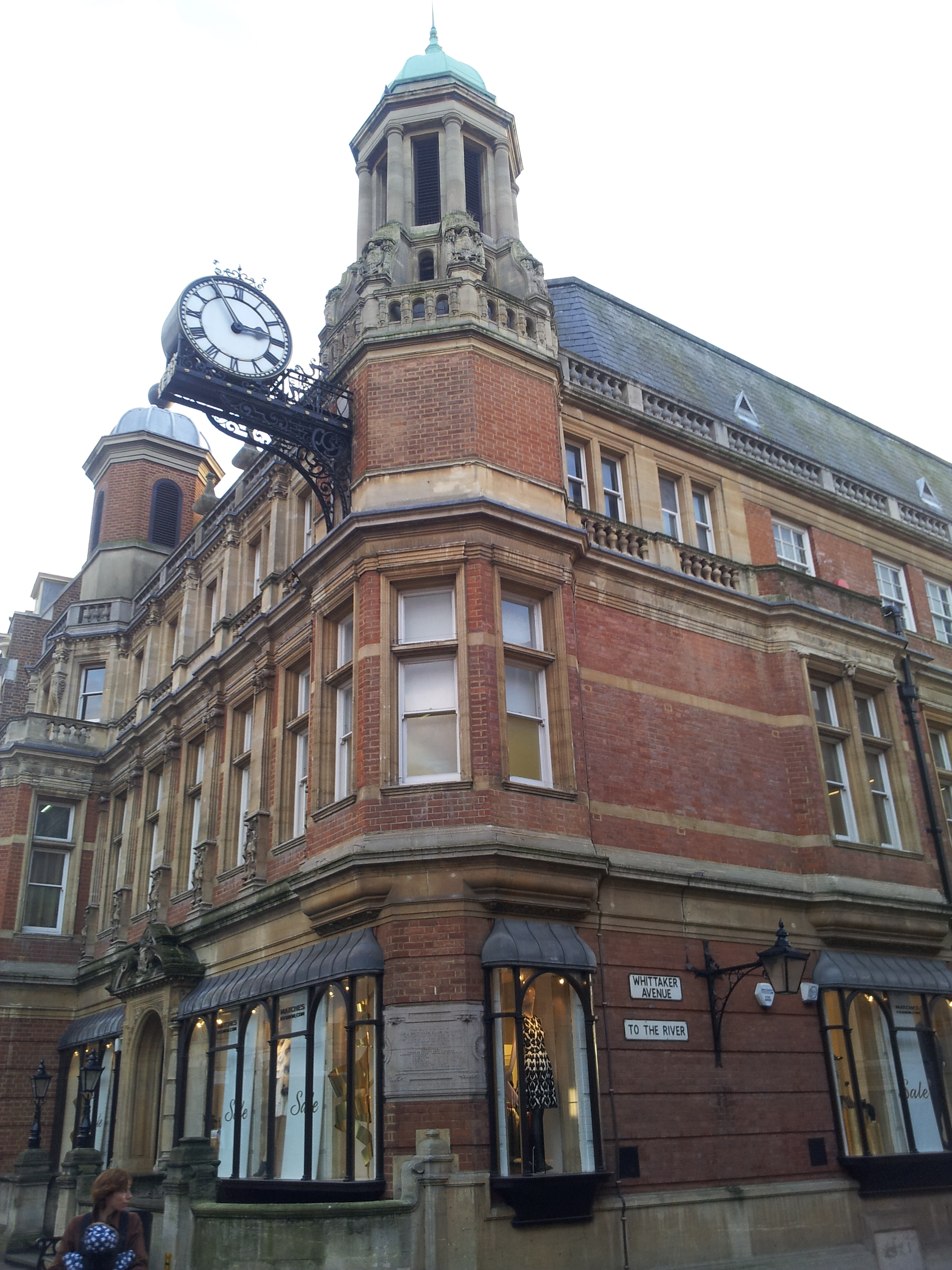
The Old Town Hall, which now houses Richmond Reference Library, The Museum of Richmond and the Riverside Gallery

The Museum of Richmond, in Richmond's Old Town Hall, close to Richmond Bridge, has displays relating to the history of Richmond, Ham, Petersham and Kew. Its rotating exhibitions, education activities and a programme of events cover the whole of the modern borough. The museum's highlights include 16th-century glass from Richmond Palace and a painting, The Terrace and View from Richmond Hill, Surrey by Dutch draughtsman and painter Leonard Knyff (1650–1722), which is part of the Richmond upon Thames Borough Art Collection.

Orleans House Gallery in Twickenham displays material from the borough's art collection. This includes a portrait of James Johnston by Thomas Gibson, paintings of Orleans House by Arthur Vickers and several other artists, and the Burton Collection, which includes artwork, personal effects and photographs of the explorer Richard Francis Burton. The gallery is also the site of the borough's arts service and provides educational workshops for a wide variety of ages, using the converted stables and coach house as educational spaces.

Garrick's Temple to Shakespeare in Hampton hosts a free Sunday afternoon Shakespeare exhibition from April to October and a series of summer drama, music and exhibitions.

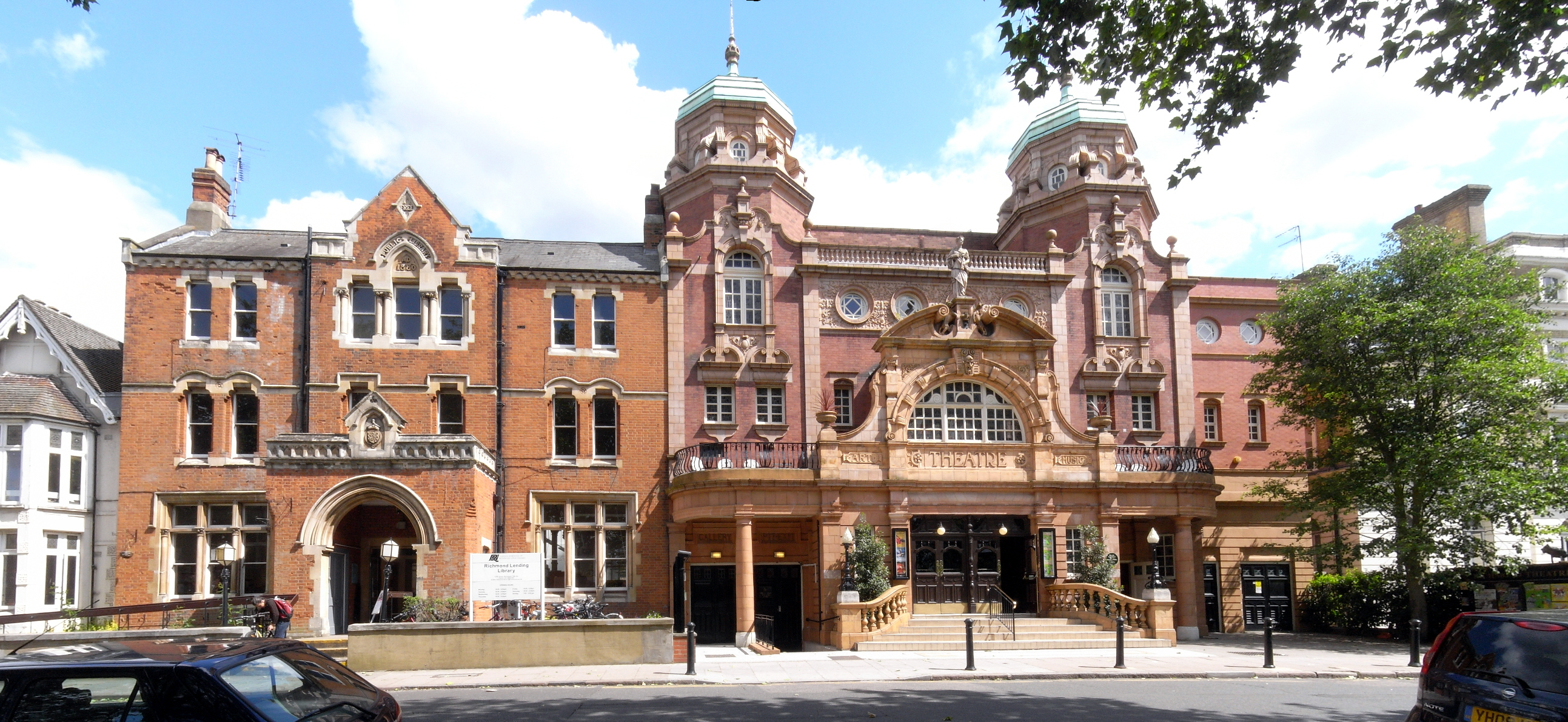
Richmond Lending Library and Richmond Theatre

Richmond town has two theatres. The Richmond Theatre at the side of Little Green is a Victorian structure designed by Frank Matcham and restored and extended by Carl Toms in 1990. The theatre has a weekly schedule of plays and musicals, usually given by professional touring companies, and pre-West End shows can sometimes be seen. There is a Christmas and New Year pantomime tradition and many of Britain's greatest music hall and pantomime performers have appeared here.

Close to Richmond railway station is the Orange Tree Theatre which was founded in 1971 in a room above the Orange Tree pub. As audience numbers increased there was pressure to find a more accommodating space and, in 1991, the company moved to current premises within a converted primary school. The 172-seat theatre was built specifically as a theatre-in-the-round. It has acquired a national reputation for the quality of its work for staging new plays, and for discovering undeservedly forgotten old plays and neglected classics.

Performance group Richmond Opera rehearse regularly at The Vineyard Centre.

The Cabbage Patch pub on London Road near Twickenham railway station has, since 1983, been a regular venue for live music on Sunday nights, organised by TwickFolk.

In 2015, Barnes became home to London's largest dedicated children's book event, the Barnes Children's Literature Festival, which is now the second largest in Europe.

== Twin towns and sister cities ==
Richmond upon Thames is twinned with Fontainebleau, France (since 1977), Konstanz, Germany (since 1983) and Richmond, Virginia, United States (since 1980).

== Freedom of the Borough ==
The following individuals and organisations have been awarded the Freedom of the London Borough of Richmond upon Thames:

Year	Recipient	Notes
2025	Sir Vince Cable	Cable was MP for Twickenham 1997–2015 and 2017–2019, Cabinet minister from 2010 to 2015 and Leader of the Liberal Democrats 2017–2019.
2022	Alan Benson	Benson, who died in 2023, was a local disability rights activist and a campaigner for accessible travel.
2018	The Poppy Factory	The award was presented in 2018, the 100th anniversary of the ending of the First World War.
2017	Gillian Norton	Norton was Chief Executive of Richmond Council from 1999 to 2016.
2017	Sir David Williams	Williams was a councillor for forty years, and Leader of the Council from 1983 to 2001.
2014	Sir David Attenborough	David Attenborough, broadcaster, natural historian, conservationist and writer, has lived in the borough since 1952.
2014	Auriol Smith and Sam Walters	Smith, and her husband Sam Walters, co-founded Richmond's Orange Tree Theatre and stepped down from their posts at the theatre in June 2014.
2004	Lawrence Dallaglio, Jason Leonard and Joe Worsley	Dallaglio, Leonard and Worsley were given the freedom of the borough in recognition of their contribution to England's victory in the 2003 Rugby World Cup.
1990	M S Hebron	Hebron was the borough's Director of Technical Services in the 1970s and 1980s.
1986	Keith Morell	Morell was Leader of the Council from 1980 to 1983.
1980	A W B Goode	Goode was Chief Executive of Richmond Council.
1978	Harry Hall	Hall was the Council's first Leader, from 1964 to 1978.
1975	Montague William ("Monty") Garrett	Garrett was the first mayor of the London Borough of Richmond upon Thames, from 1965 to 1966.
1970	W H Jones	Jones was the borough's first Town Clerk.
1965	Edward Stanley Bolton	Bolton was the mayor of the Municipal Borough of Barnes, from 1943 to 1945.
1965	James Henry Knaggs	Knaggs was mayor of the Municipal Borough of Twickenham in 1933 and Chairman of Middlesex County Council.
1965	H M Lane	
1965	Hyman Appleby Leon	Leon was the second mayor of the London Borough of Richmond upon Thames, from 1966 to 1967. He had been Mayor of the pre-1965 Municipal Borough of Richmond from 1959 to 1961.
1965	W J Slade	
1965	Calvert H E Smith	Smith was mayor of the Municipal Borough of Richmond from 1934 to 1935.
1965	Thomas Raymond Starr	Starr, a Labour councillor, was mayor of the Municipal Borough of Richmond from 1945 to 1946.
1965	E S Stevens	
1965	Francis George Sutton-Mattocks	Sutton-Mattocks was an alderman of Barnes Borough Council and Barnes' mayor from 1946 to 1947.
1965	A J H Thomas	
1965	P J Young	
1965	W Young	

== See also ==
- List of people from the London Borough of Richmond upon Thames
- Richmond upon Thames London Borough Council
