= Seathwaite Fell =

Fell in the Lake District, Cumbria, England

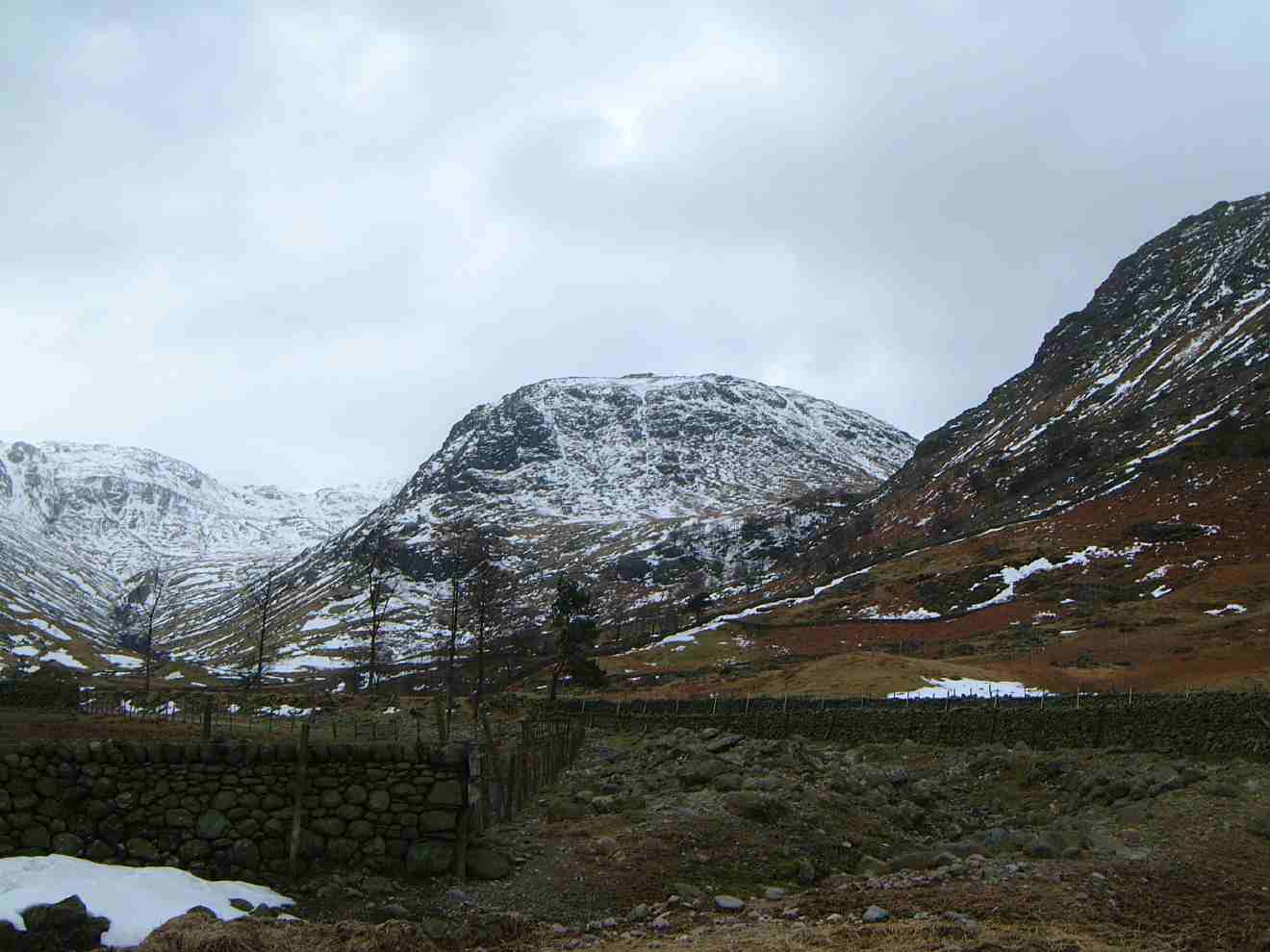
- Seathwaite Fell from Seathwaite.

Highest point
- Elevation: 632 m (2,073 ft)
- Prominence: 31 m (102 ft)
- Parent peak: Great End
- Listing: Hewitt, Nuttall, Wainwright (see below)
- Coordinates: 54°28′41″N 3°11′31″W

Geography
- Location within the Lake District Location within the former Allerdale Borough
- Location: Cumbria, England
- Parent range: Lake District, Southern Fells
- OS grid: NY227097
- Topo map: OS Landrangers 89, 90, Explorers OL4, OL6

Listed summits of Seathwaite Fell
Name	Grid ref	Height	Status
Seathwaite Fell South Top	NY227094	631 m (2,070 ft)	Nuttall
Seathwaite Fell 'Traditional' Top	NY229102	601 m (1,972 ft)	Wainwright

Seathwaite Fell is an area of the Lake District in Cumbria, England. It stands above the hamlet of the same name at the head of Borrowdale.

== Position of the summit ==
The fell is very rugged with several small tops along the summit of the ridge. At the northern end is a peaked summit at 1,971 feet (601 m), very prominent from the valley below. Alfred Wainwright took this as the summit of the fell in his influential Pictorial Guide to the Lakeland Fells, even though he readily acknowledged that it wasn't the highest point. This is one of many subjective decisions which differentiate Wainwrights from more modern (and logical) hill lists such as Nuttalls and Hewitts. Wainwright stated that the 1,971 feet (601 m) top was generally regarded as the summit of the fell, although he cited no references. Other guidebooks have taken Wainwright's lead, Mark Richards stating Stand upon that (northern) pike and you know why tradition has ordained this to be the summit. The view down Borrowdale is peerless. A new generation of fellwalkers may arrive seeking to overthrow the traditional perception and feeling no compunction at adopting the highest ground as a summit. Richards does at least acknowledge the highest point as a top, as does Birkett, who gives equal status to both.

To provide ease of identification, the highest point 2,073 feet (632 m) is immediately east of Great Slack on Ordnance Survey maps. Great Slack being the name of the broad rake on the SW of the fell. Point 632 stands near the centre of the fell and is listed as a Nuttall and a Hewitt, but not of course as a Wainwright. The situation is further complicated by a third top to the south 2,070 feet (630 m). This has been of little interest to guidebook writers, but of great significance to the authors of modern hill lists based purely upon height and prominence. Thus Seathwaite Fell South Top, unnamed on maps, is a Nuttall, reducing the 'traditional' summit to third place.

== Topography ==
Seathwaite Fell is a northern ridge of Great End in the Scafells. It projects out from beneath the great northern cliff of its parent, occupying a tongue of land between two tributaries of the River Derwent. These are Styhead Gill to the west and Grains Gill to the east, the streams meeting at Stockley Bridge below the nose of the fell. Sty Head Gill falls from the walkers' pass at Sty Head, the main pedestrian route from Borrowdale to Wasdale. Near the head of the pass is Styhead Tarn. This in turn is fed by the outflow of Sprinkling Tarn, a beautiful indented pool lying between Seathwaite Fell and Great End. Sprinkling Tarn lies very close to the course of Grains Gill, ensuring that Seathwaite Fell is almost surrounded by water.

The prow of the fell above Stockley Bridge has two tiers of crag, with Aaron Crags standing above Black Waugh. A long line of crags also stands above Grains Gill on the eastern side, looming above the popular path from Seathwaite to Esk Hause. The western face, although rough, drops more gently down to Styhead Gill. In addition to a number of rocky knolls, the summit ridge also carries numerous small tarns. None are named on Ordnance Survey maps, although the one below the south top is of a reasonable size.

The 'traditional' northern top and point 632 have small cairns. The view northward is good from both, but only the traditional top shows the foreground of upper Borrowdale. To the south is an intimate view of the cliffs of Great End.

== Geology ==
The summit plateau is composed of volcaniclastic sandstone of the Seathwaite Fell Formation, with a dyke of andesite and hybridized andesite porphyry running due north from Sprinkling Tarn. The coarse grained sandstone and breccia of the Cam Crag Member is exposed further down the northern slope.

== Precipitation ==
Seathwaite is listed as having 3,552 mm (139.8 in) of rainfall annually; this figure makes it the wettest place with rainfall statistics in England. The rain gauge used for this measurement is on the slope of Seathwaite Fell above the hamlet.

Provisionally, the 24-hour total rainfall at Seathwaite (ending 0045 on Friday 20 November 2009) of 314.4 mm (12.38 in) is a UK record for a single location in any given 24-hour period. Records going back to 1914.

== Ascents ==
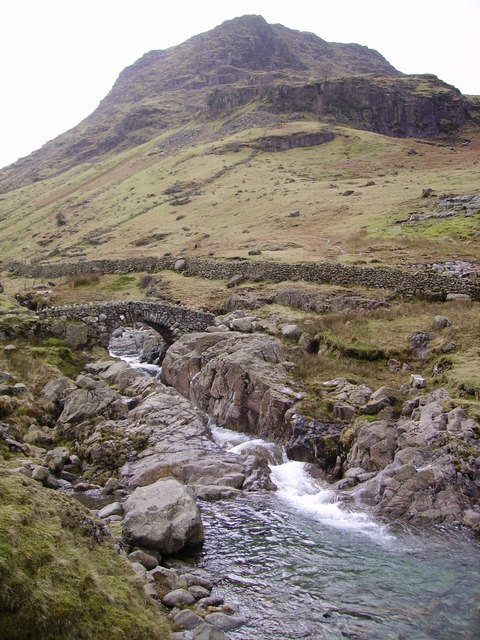
Seathwaite Fell and Stockley Bridge

The fell is most frequently climbed from Seathwaite, taking the bridleway from Stockley Bridge which goes to Styhead Tarn for a kilometre, passing the waterfall of Taylorgill Force, before striking south westerly over rocky terrain to reach the cairned northern summit. A ridge path works its way south from here although it bypasses both Great Slack and the south top and a short detour is needed to reach them. An alternative is to make for Sprinkling Tarn from either Esk Hause or Sty Head and then work back along the ridge.

== Popular culture ==
Auntie Mabel and Pippin visit Seathwaite Fell in the second episode of the third series of Come Outside, as they learnt about how graphite was discovered and how pencils are made.
