= Seven Wonders of Nature =

Seven Wonders of Nature may refer to:

- Seven Natural Wonders, a BBC Two television series which showed 'natural wonders' from areas around England
- New Seven Wonders of Nature, an initiative to create a list of seven natural wonders chosen through a global poll

== See also ==
- Wonders of the World#Seven Natural Wonders of the World
