= Alan Benson =

Al, Allen, Allan or Alan Benson may refer to:

- Alan Benson (activist) (1969–2023), British disability rights activist
- Allan L. Benson (1871–1940), American newspaper editor and author
- Allen Benson (Allen Wilbert Benson, 1905–1999), American baseball pitcher
- Al Benson (1908–1978), American radio DJ and music promoter
- Al Benson (basketball) (1914–?), American center in NBL
