= Angela Strank =

Chief Scientist at BP

Dame Angela Strank DBE FRS FREng FIChemE
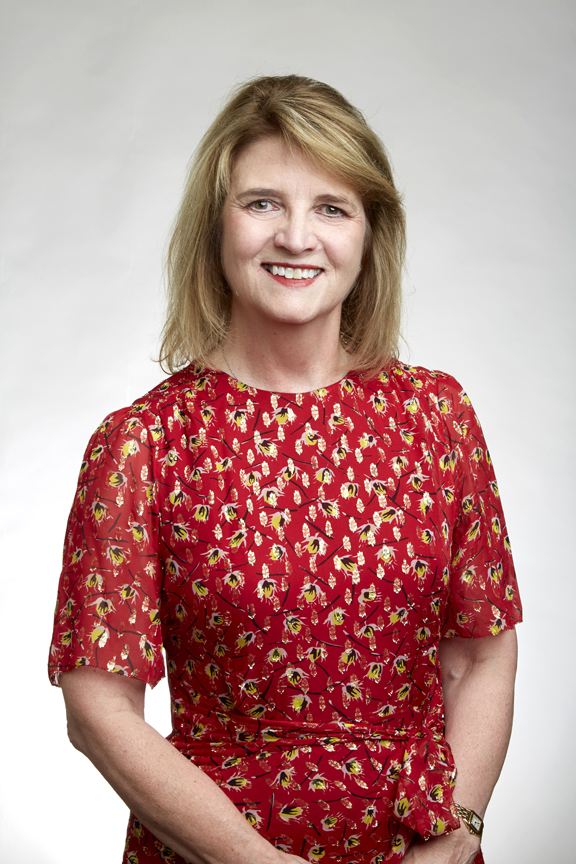
- Strank in 2018
- Born: Angela Rosemary Emily Strank; October 1952 (age 73)
- Education: University of Manchester
- Children: 2
- Scientific career
- Workplaces: BP; British Geological Survey; University of Manchester
- Thesis: Foraminiferal biostratigraphy of the Holkerian, Asbian and Brigantian stages of the British lower carboniferous
- Doctoral advisor: Fred M. Broadhurst
- Website: www.manchester.ac.uk/discover/governance/structure/board-governors/members/angela-strank/

Dame Angela Rosemary Emily Strank (born October 1952) is a British engineer who is head of downstream technology and chief scientist of BP, responsible for technology across all the refining, petrochemicals, lubricants and fuels businesses.

== Education ==
Strank was educated at the University of Manchester where she received a Bachelor of Science degree in geology in 1975 followed by a PhD in micropalaeontology in 1981. Her doctoral research investigated the foraminiferal stratigraphy of the Holkerian, Asbian and Brigantian stages of the British lower carboniferous and was supervised by Fred M. Broadhurst.

== Career ==
In 1980, Strank joined the British Geological Survey by what she says was becoming a geologist "by accident". In 1982, she joined BP as a geologist. In 2013, she joined the University of Manchester's board of governors. In April 2014, she was appointed chief scientist. She also serves as a non-executive director at Severn Trent Water plc.

=== Honours and awards ===
In 2010, she won the UK First Women's Award in Science and Technology, an award sponsored by the UK Government (CBI) in recognition of pioneering UK women in business and industry.

In the 2017 Birthday Honours, Strank was appointed Dame Commander of the Most Excellent Order of the British Empire (DBE). In the same year she was elected a Fellow of the Royal Academy of Engineering (FREng). She was elected a Fellow of the Royal Society (FRS) in 2018 for substantial contributions to the improvement of natural knowledge. She was awarded an honorary Doctor of Science (DSc) by Royal Holloway, University of London in 2018.

==== Coat of arms ====
By Letters Patent of Garter and Clarenceux Kings of Arms dated 1 July 2019, from the College of Arms, Strank was granted arms:

Coat of arms of Angela Strank
Escutcheon Barry wavy of six Gules and Azure on a Pile reversed throughout Argent fimbriated Or between two Escallops Or three Bees volant one and two proper. Motto Ne Cede Umquam Badge Two Seaxes in saltire Gules hilts and pommels in base Or surmounted by a geological Hammer palewise Azure the head Or the whole surmounted at the centre by a May Flower proper.

== Personal life ==
Strank has two children.
