= Holkerian =

The Holkerian is a sub-stage of the Viséan stage of the International Commission on Stratigraphy (ICS) geological timescale. It is one of five sub-stages commonly used in the Viséan stage within stratigraphy by British, Irish and other geologists outside the US and Asia.

As part of the Viséan, Holkerian rocks were formed about 339 to 335 million years ago, in the Early Carboniferous subperiod. Rock formations laid down in this time were frequently different types of fossiliferous limestone. The material for all these rocks was laid down in warm, sub-tropical marine conditions of the time when north-western Europe was close to the equator.

== Definition ==
In 1976, the Viséan and Tournaisian were divided into six stages (now substages) by George et al. (the substages underwent some redefinition by Waters et al. in 2011). The Holkerian base was defined at the boundary between the Dalton Beds and the Park Limestone Formation at Barker Scar, Cumbria. The boundary was supposed to be below the appearance of certain sea organisms, including Pojarkovella nibelis; this organism is found elsewhere below this lithological boundary definition. The upper limit of the Holkerian (at the Asbian) was defined at Little Asby Scar, Cumbria. This boundary was supposed to be below the appearance of three organisms, Dibunophyllum bourtonense, Siphonodendron pauciradiale and S. junceum. Similar organisms are found elsewhere in Holkerian rocks.

== Holkerian sub-stage rocks ==
The Park Limestone Formation of south Cumbria, in the north west of England, is an example of rock from the Holkerian. The name of the sub-stage actually comes from Holker in Cumbria where part of Holker Hall estates lie on the limestone.

East of Cumbria lie the Yorkshire Dales which contain large areas of Holkerian limestone, sometimes forming dramatic landscapes such as Scaleber Force and Gordale Scar, some of which are quarried commercially.

Further south, another area associated with the sub-stage is south Wales, where Holkerian limestone of the Hunts Bay Oolite Subgroup forms bedrock ranging from the western Gower peninsula to the Wye valley and quarried at locations such as Creigiau, north-west of Cardiff.

The Tubber Formation of the extensive and substantial Burren limestone region of Co.Clare, Ireland, consists of rocks that were deposited in a time beginning in the Arundian and finishing in the Holkerian substages.

== Gallery ==
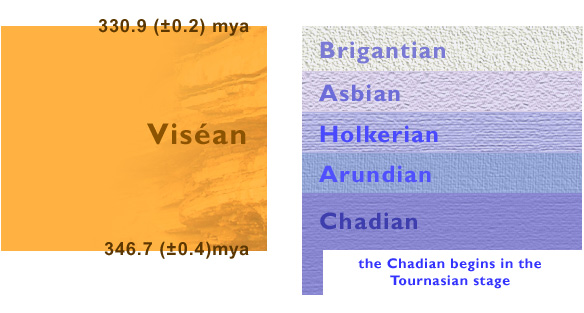
The Viséan stage of the stratigraphic column, with start and end dates, showing the sub-stages with the Holkerian in the middle. The dates for the sub-stages are not yet available.

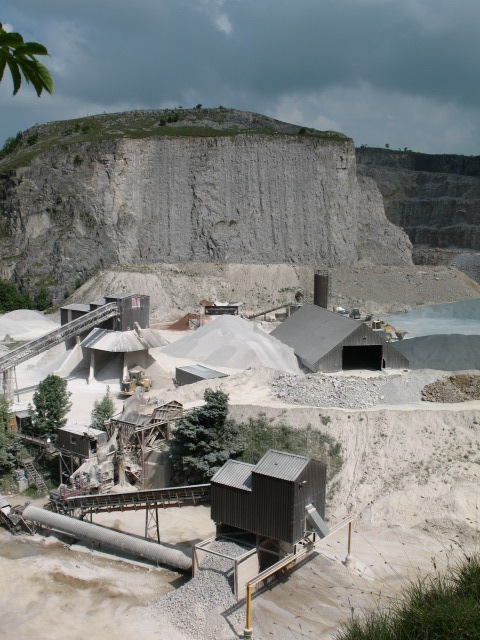
Excavation of Holkerian limestone from Giggleswick Quarry in the Yorkshire Dales, northern England.

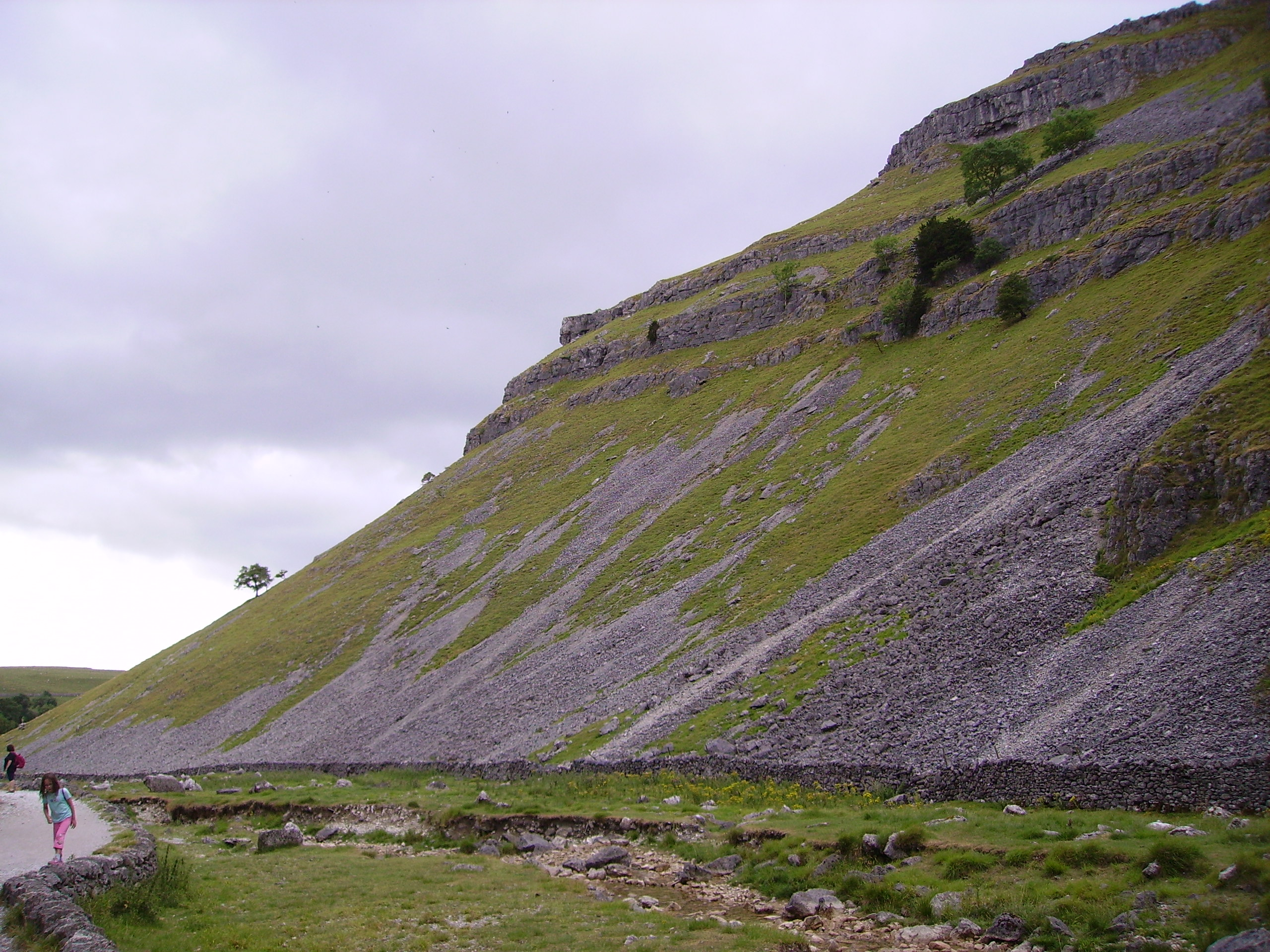
The rocks of Gordale Scar, in the Yorkshire Dales of England. The bottom part from the grassy slope up to the top of the first scar is Holkerian limestone.

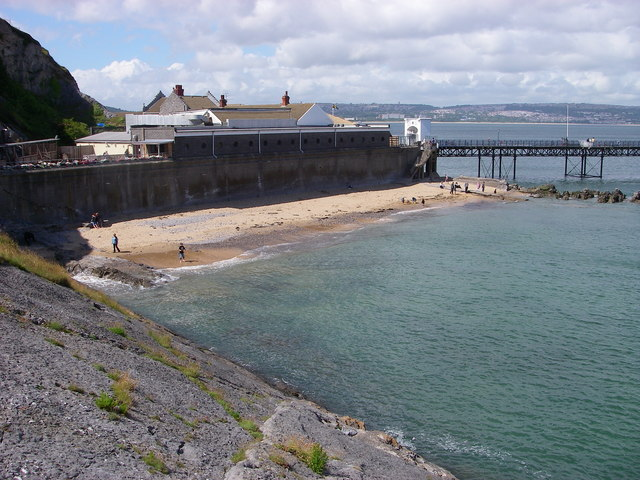
Holkerian Hunts Bay oolite makes up the rocks by Mumbles pier, eastern Gower, south Wales, dipping into the Bristol Channel.

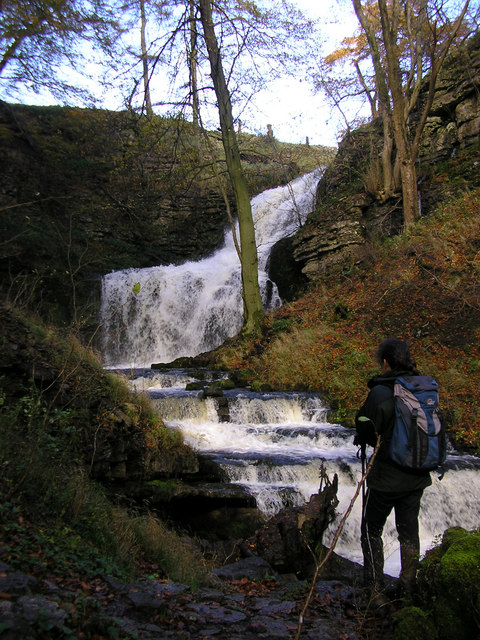
Scaleber Force (North Yorkshire) where the Scaleber Beck flows over the edge of a limestone escarpment.
