= Richmond Falls =

Waterfalls in North Yorkshire, England

Coordinates: 54.401025°N 1.734254°W

Richmond Falls are a series of waterfalls along the River Swale, they are situated at grid reference NZ173006 near to the town centre of Richmond, North Yorkshire. They are one of, if not the last waterfalls on the Swale before the river reaches the lower country grounds of the Vale of Mowbray, their normally medial size can be affected easily, much like the rest of the Swale, by heavy rain and flooding, making for dramatic viewing. Because of the steep nature of the rocks, the falls are a barrier to fish passage upstream.

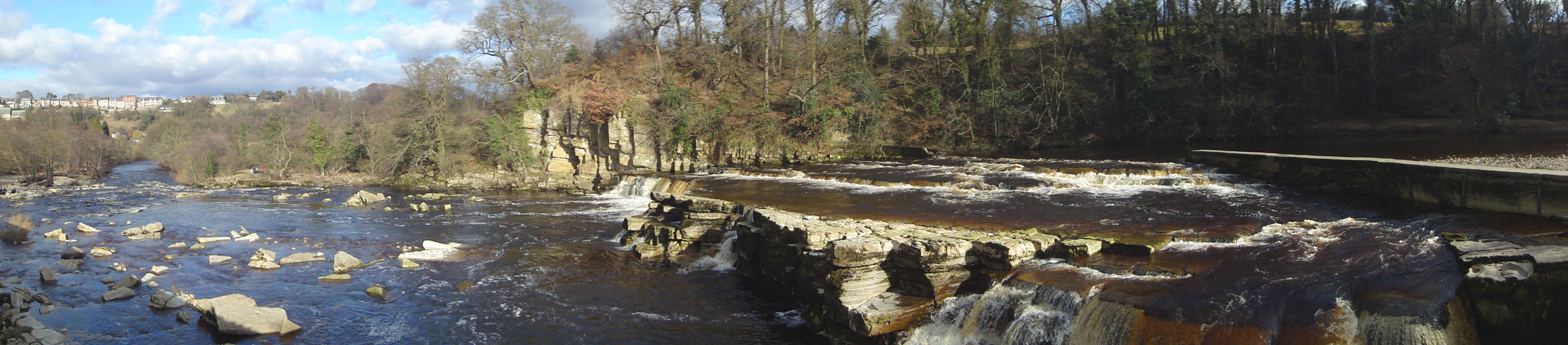
Panorama of Richmond Falls

== See also ==
- List of waterfalls
- List of waterfalls in England
