= Horse Rangers Association =

The Horse Rangers Association
- Formation: 1954
- Founder: Raymond Gordon
- Legal status: charity
- Headquarters: London
- Location: Hampton Court, London
- Official language: English
- Director: Laura Griffith
- Main organ: The Horse Rangers Association’s Newsletter
- Website: www.horserangers.org.uk

The Horse Rangers Association is a registered charity which teaches horsemanship and management of horses so that youngsters of all backgrounds and abilities, from the age of 8 years, can benefit in their own personal development. It is not a riding school.

The Association is based at The Royal Mews, Hampton Court in the London Borough of Richmond upon Thames. A member group of the Riding for the Disabled Association (RDA), it is registered with the British Horse Society (BHS).

== History ==
The Horse Rangers Association was founded in Shepperton, Surrey in 1954 by Raymond Gordon. The charity relocated to the Royal Mews, Hampton Court during the 1960s. Raymond Gordon’s vision was to enable young people, who would not otherwise have the opportunity, to manage horses and ride; from early in the charity’s existence this included young people with special needs.

== Activities ==
More than 400 children and young people attend classes at the Association each week. The Association's special needs classes operate at its indoor school, located at the Stockyard, Bushy Park.

== Organisation ==
The board of trustees is chaired by Gemma Ractliffe.
