= WWT London Wetland Centre =

Wetland reserve in London

Coordinates: 51.4786°N 0.2331°W

- Site of Special Scientific Interest
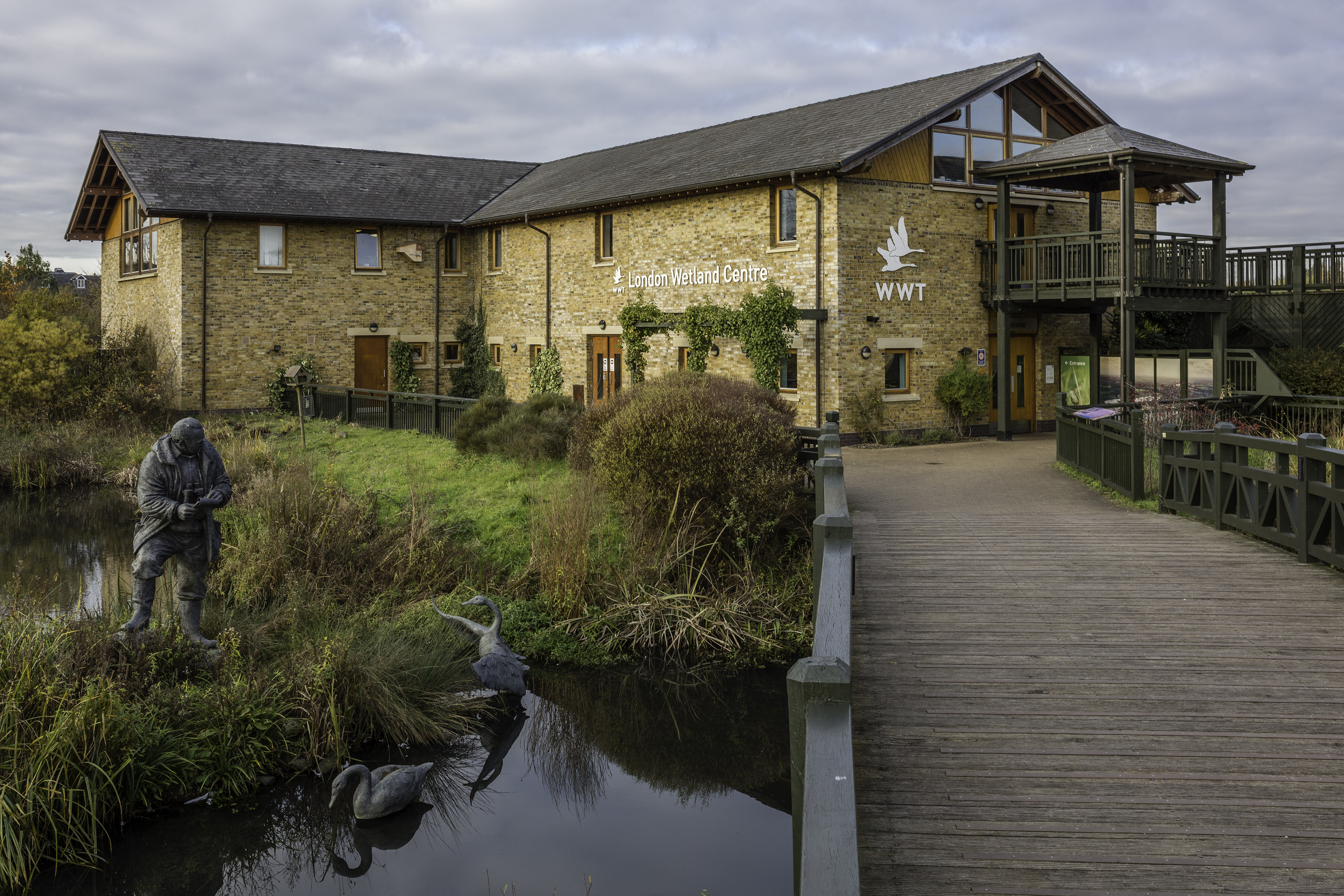
- The entrance to the London Wetland Centre Visitors Centre and the statue of Peter Scott by Nicola Godden on the left
- Location of WWT London Wetland Centre.
- Area of search: Greater London
- Grid reference: TQ 228770
- Interest: Biological
- Area: 29.9 ha (74 acres)
- Notification date: 2002
- Location map: Magic Map

WWT London Wetland Centre is a wetland reserve managed by the Wildfowl and Wetlands Trust in the Barnes area of the London Borough of Richmond upon Thames, southwest London, England, by Barn Elms. The site is formed of four disused Victorian reservoirs tucked into a loop in the Thames.

The centre first opened in 2000, and in 2002 an area of 29.9 hectares was designated a Site of Special Scientific Interest as the Barn Elms Wetland Centre.

The centre occupies more than 100 acres (40 hectares) of land which was formerly occupied by several small reservoirs. These were converted into a wide range of wetland features and habitats before the centre opened in May 2000. It was the first urban project of its kind in the United Kingdom.

Many wild birds which have now made their home in the centre cannot be found anywhere else in London, and there are nationally significant numbers of gadwall and northern shoveler. Other wild birds include Eurasian bittern, northern pintail, northern lapwing, water rail, ring-necked parakeet, Eurasian sparrowhawk, sand martin, common kingfisher, little grebe and great crested grebe. The centre also holds a collection of captive wildfowl.

It is host to regular lectures and events concerned with preserving Britain's wetland animals and was featured on the BBC television programme Seven Natural Wonders in 2005 as one of the wonders of the London area, with a focus on the region's parakeets, in an episode presented by Bill Oddie. The site contains a large visitors' building which is occasionally used as a wedding venue.

In 2012 WWT London Wetland Centre was voted Britain's Favourite Nature Reserve in the BBC Countryfile Magazine Awards. The site received 190,206 visitors during 2019.

== Image gallery ==
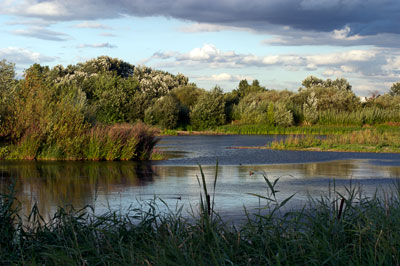
Sheltered Lagoon at the London Wetland Centre

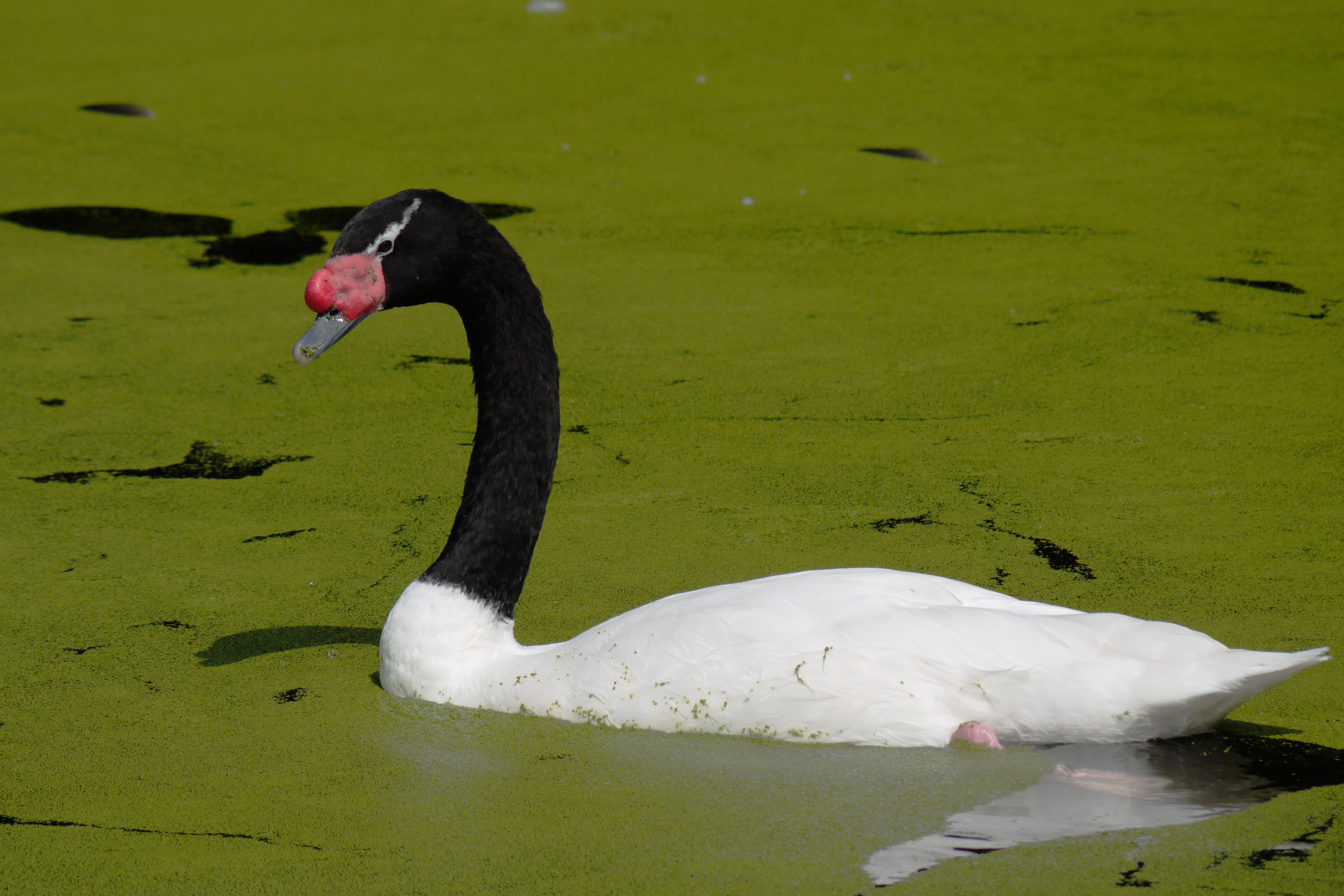
Black-necked swan at the Centre

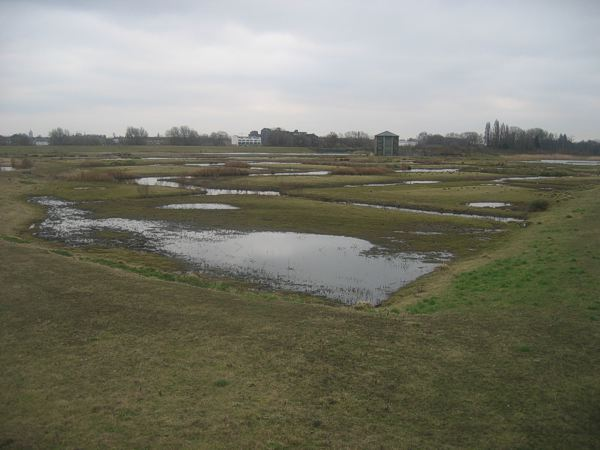
Wildfowl and Wetlands Trust London Wetland Centre

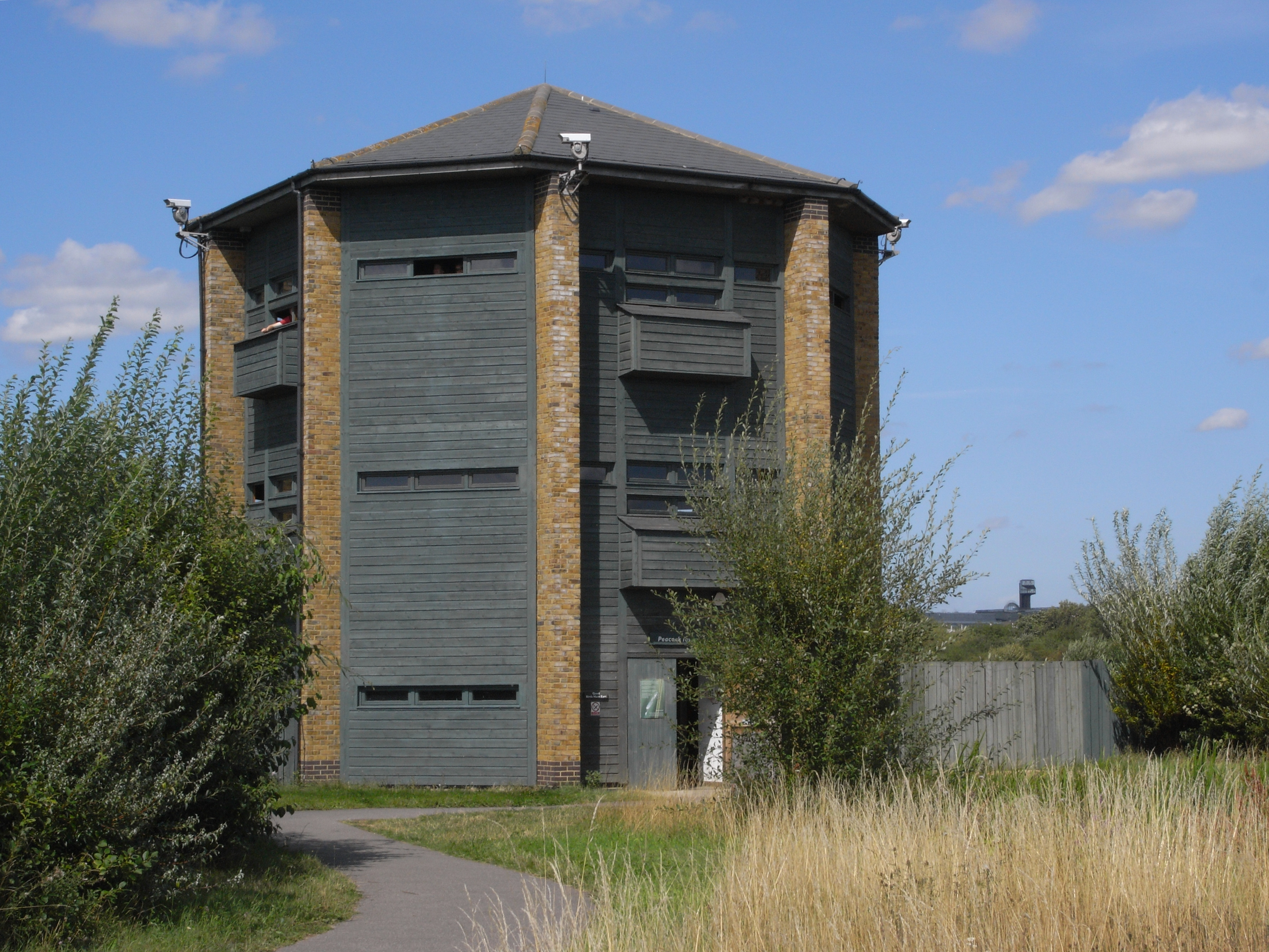
London Wetland Centre Peacock Tower

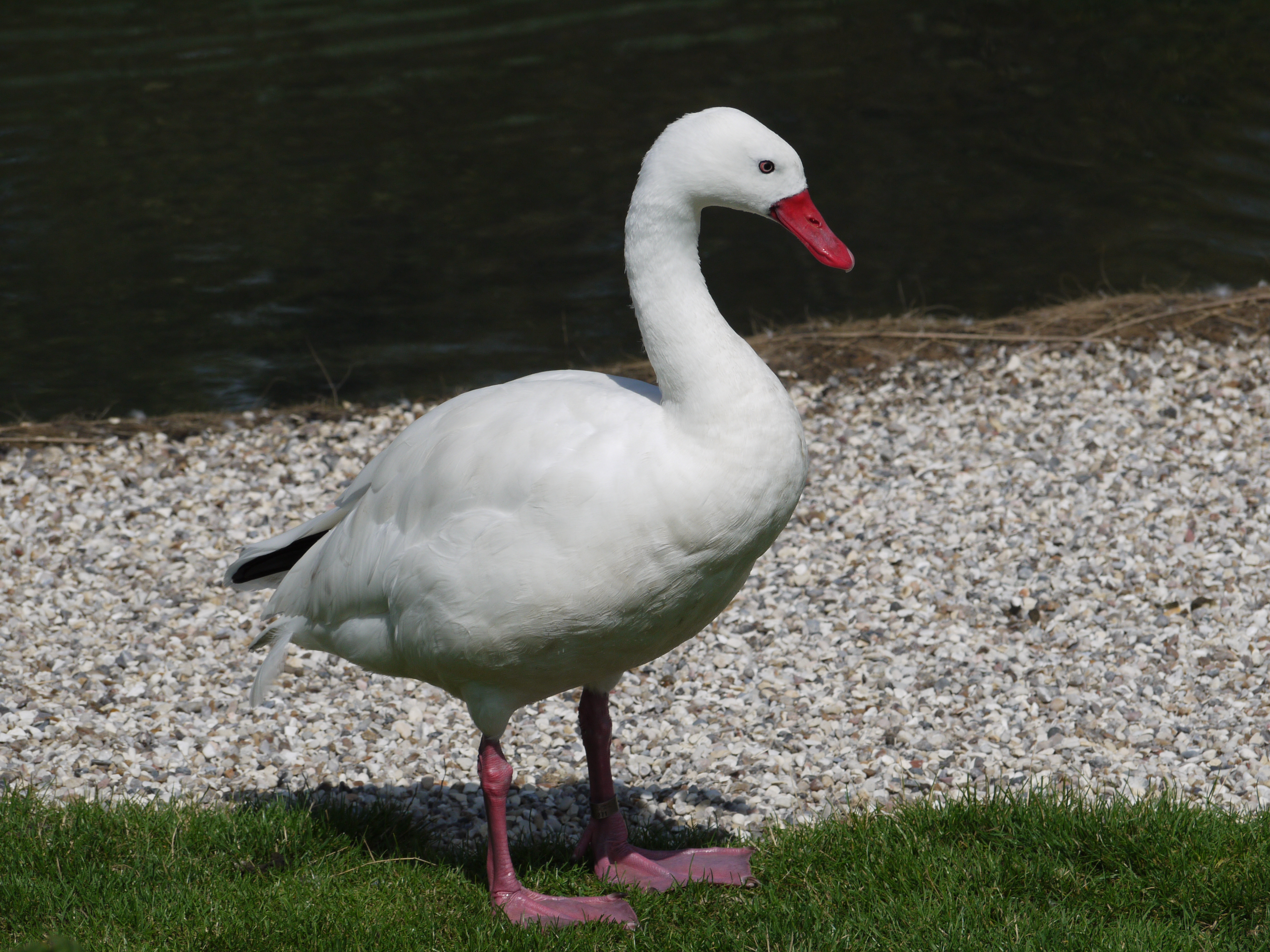
Coscoroba swan at the London Wetland Centre

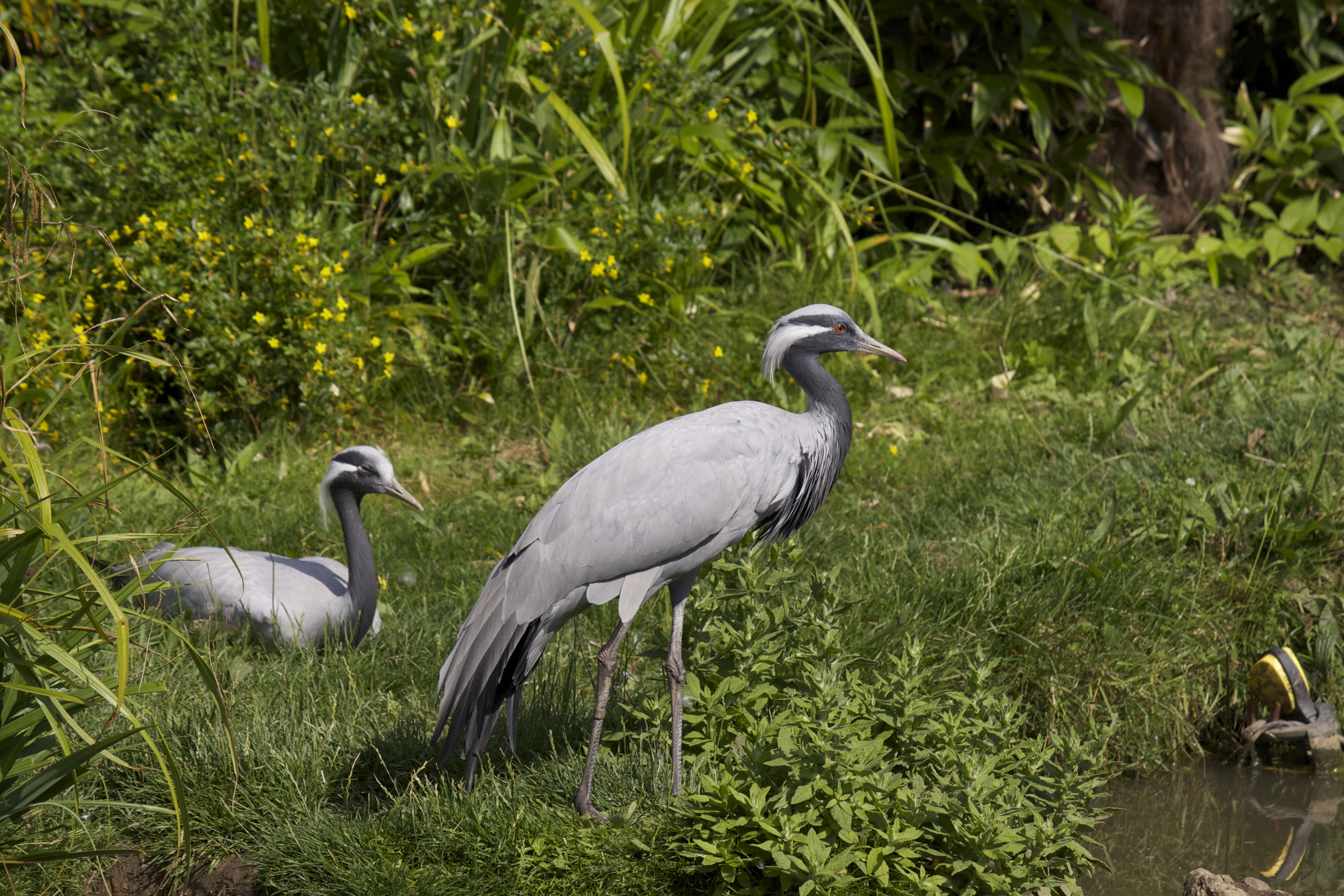
Demoiselle Cranes in WWT London Wetland Centre

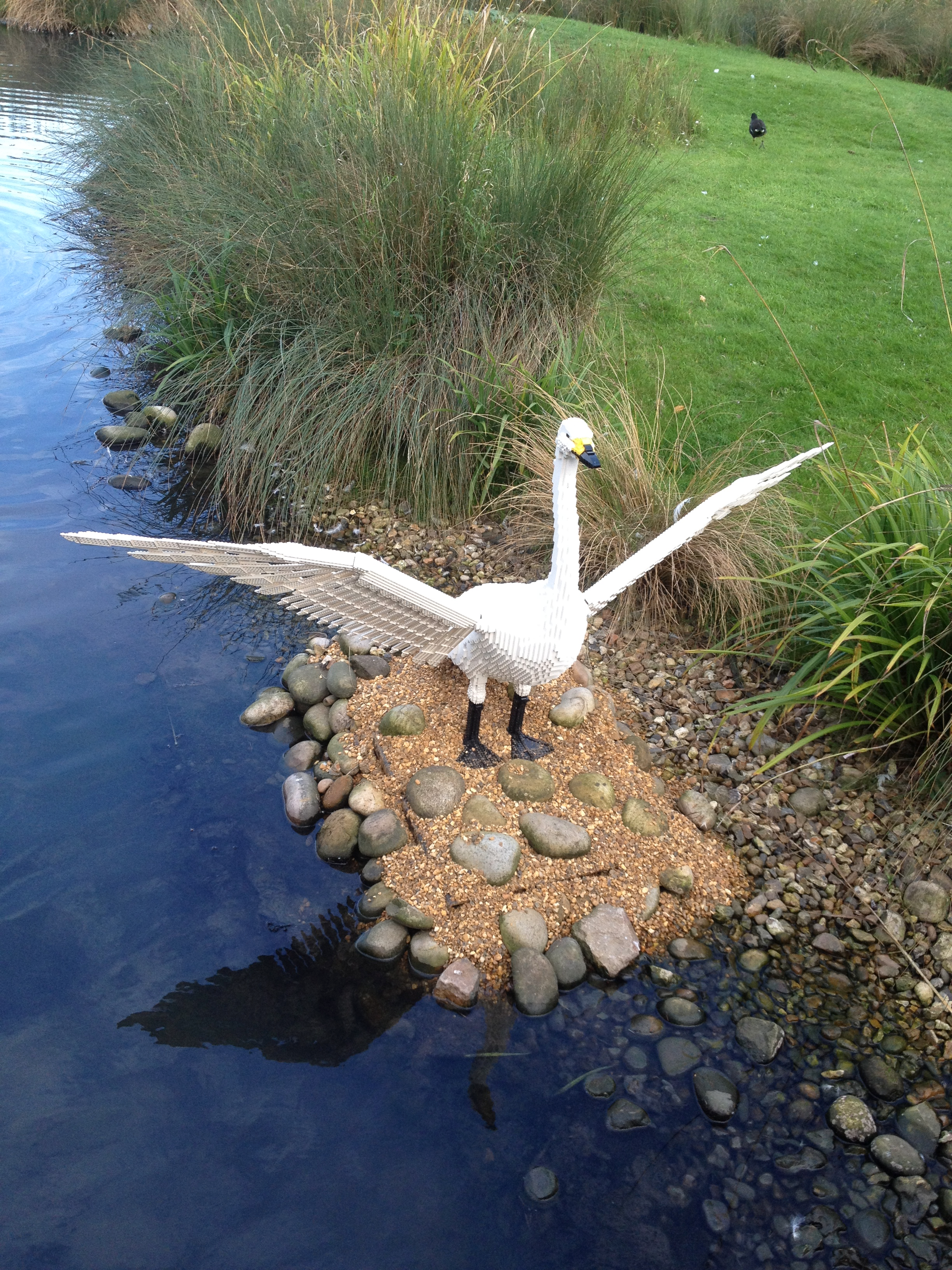
Lego swan sculpture on display in 2015

== See also ==
- List of Sites of Special Scientific Interest in London
