= Aysgarth Falls =

Waterfall in North Yorkshire, England

Coordinates: 54°17′37.09″N 1°58′56.00″W

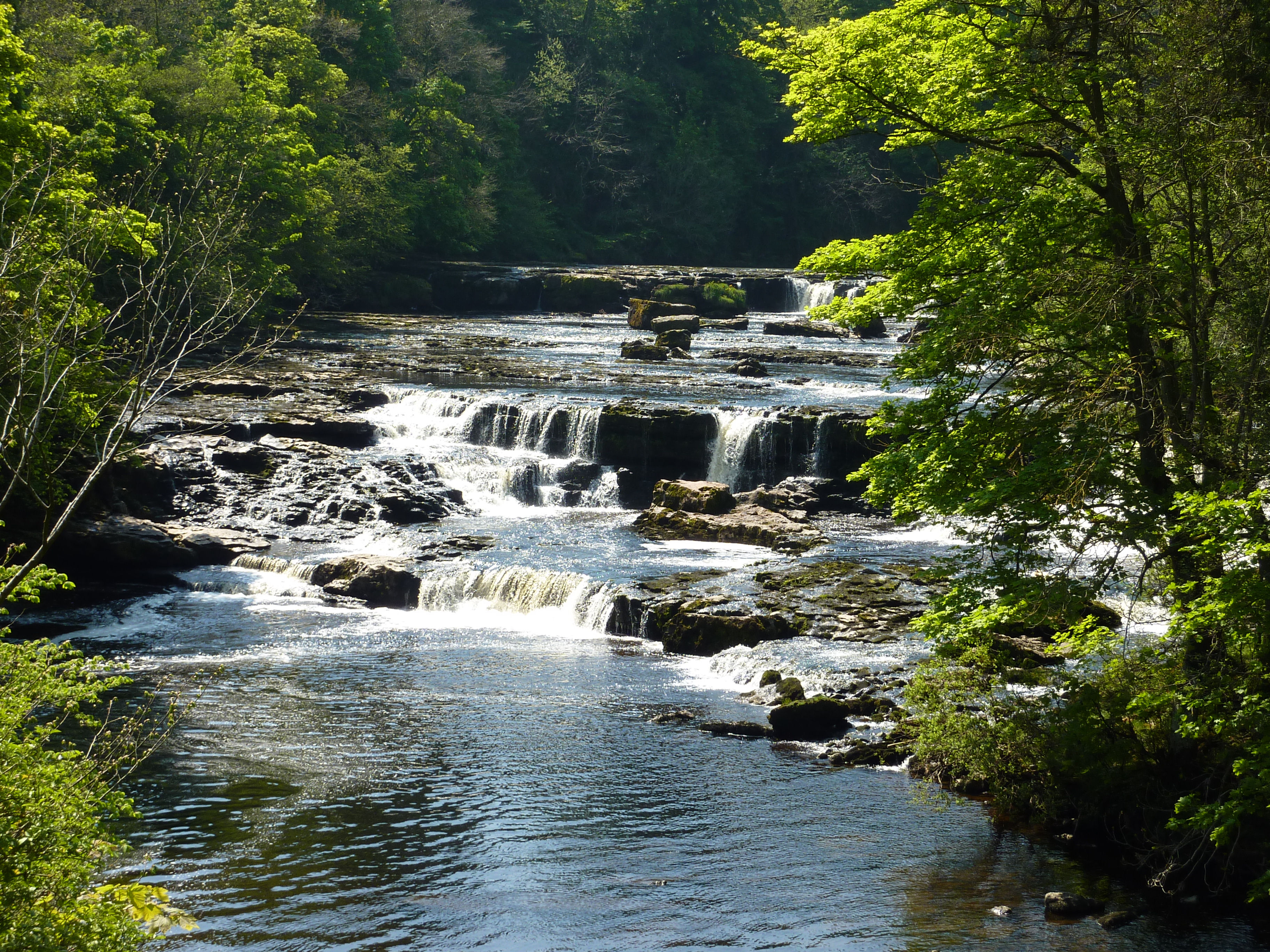
- The Upper Falls seen from the bridge
- Location: Aysgarth, North Yorkshire
- Number of drops: 3
- Run: 200 feet (61 m)
- Watercourse: River Ure

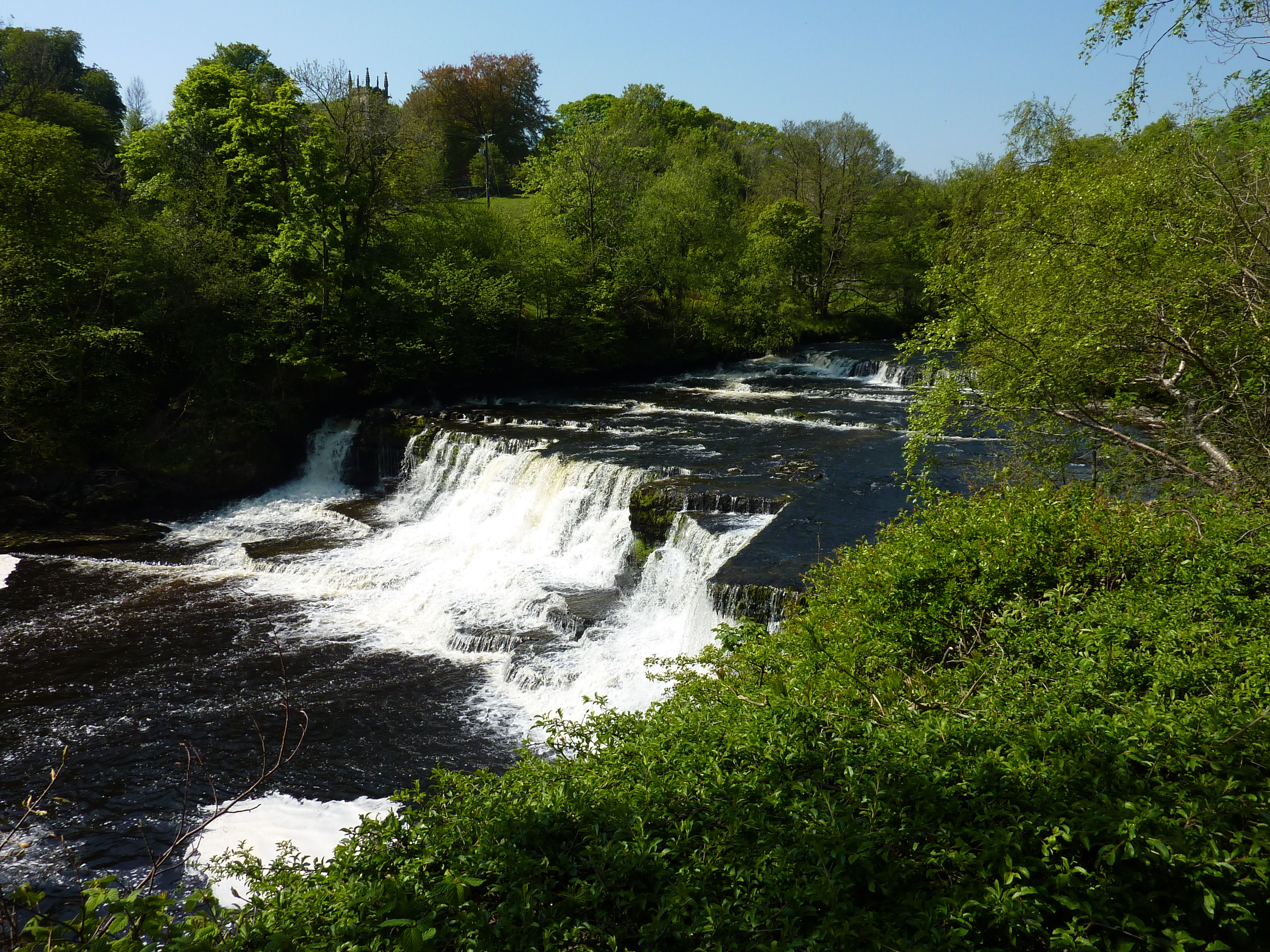
The Middle Falls from the North bank

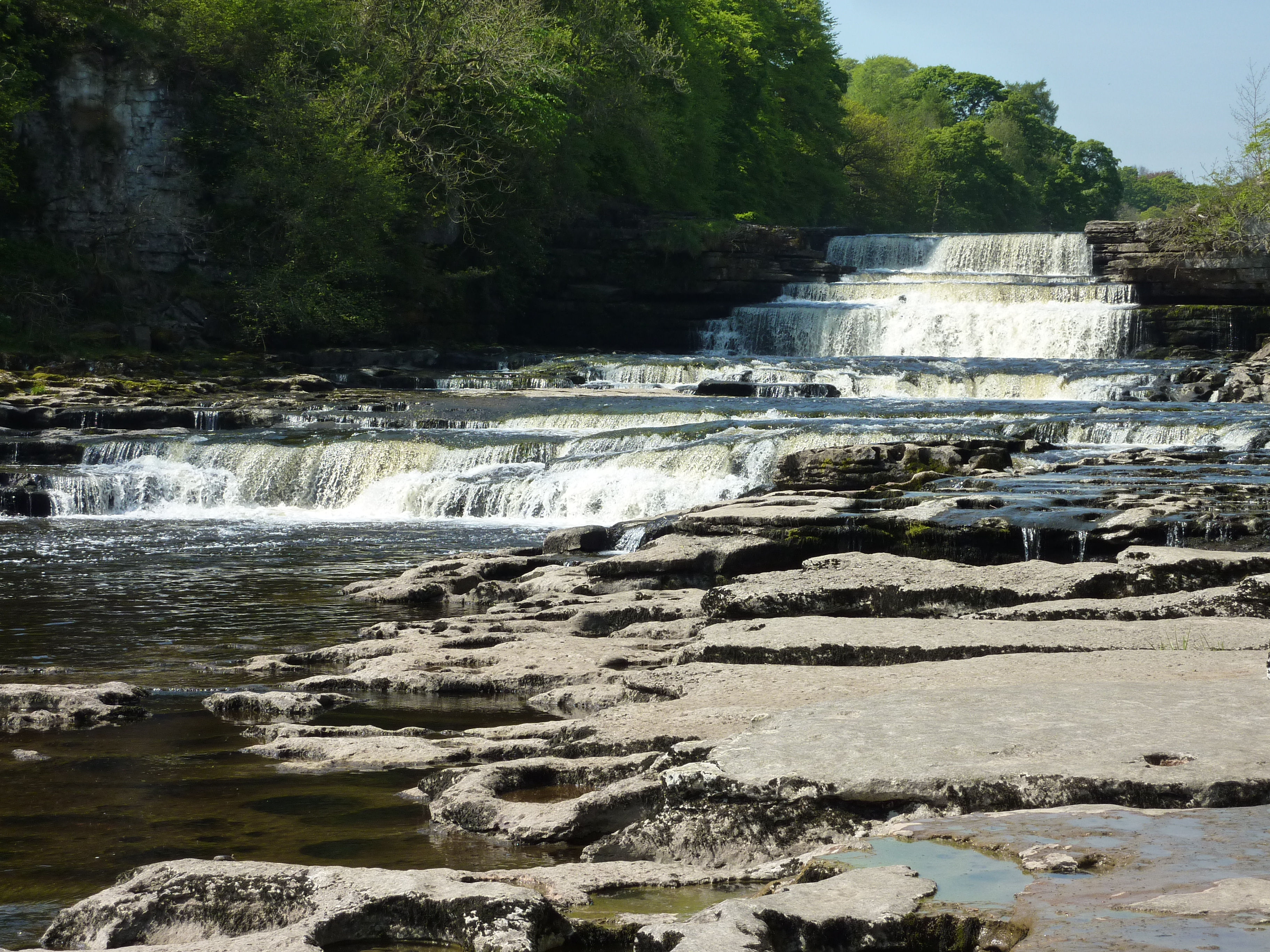
The Lower Falls from the riverside

Aysgarth Falls are a triple flight of waterfalls, surrounded by woodland and farmland, carved out by the River Ure over an almost one-mile (two-kilometre) stretch on its descent to mid-Wensleydale in the Yorkshire Dales of England, near the village Aysgarth. The falls are quite spectacular after heavy rainfall as thousands of gallons of water cascade over the series of broad limestone steps, which are divided into three stages: Upper Force, Middle Force and Lower Force.

The falls are an SSSI.

== Description ==
Aysgarth Falls have attracted visitors for more than 200 years, including John Ruskin, J. M. W. Turner and William Wordsworth, all of whom enthused about the falls' outstanding beauty. The falls were created when meltwater from the Ice Age that had been held back by a terminal moraine spilled down over the area and eroded the boulder clay and the bedrock limestone underneath. The falls drop 200 feet (61 m) over a half-mile section of the river.

The Falls are situated in the Yorkshire Dales National Park. There is a visitors' centre with an exhibition, information, items for sale, a café, toilets and a pay-and-display car park.

There are public footpaths through the wooded valley, offering views of the river and falls. Wild flowers appear in the spring and summer, for example snowdrops in January and February, primroses in April and bluebells in May, and birds, squirrels and deer may also be seen. Occasionally salmon can be seen leaping up the falls in autumn. Nearby is St Andrew's Church, which reputedly has the largest churchyard in England. The church has a medieval painted wooden screen rescued from the destroyed Jervaulx Abbey.

The name originates from Old Norse and means the open space in the oak trees.

== Popular culture ==
All three falls were featured in the films Robin Hood: Prince of Thieves and Emily Brontë's Wuthering Heights, and they were featured on the television programme Seven Natural Wonders as one of the wonders of the North.

== See also ==
- List of waterfalls
- List of waterfalls of England
