= Barker Scar =

Protected area in Cumbria, England

Coordinates: 54°11′40″N 3°1′22″W

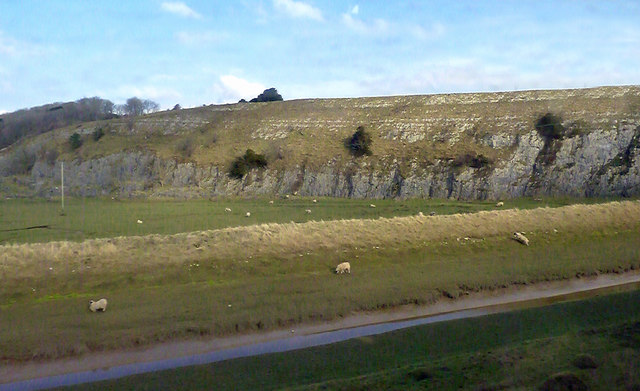
Barker Scar

Barker Scar is a 17.562 ha (43.40 acres) Site of Special Scientific Interest (SSSI) in Cumbria, England. It is located at SD335778, 3 km (1.9 mi) west of Cark and Holker Hall, and is situated on the eastern bank of the River Leven south of the Old Park Wood Holiday Park. The borders of this protected area are contiguous with the boundaries of Morecambe Bay SSSI, and so is part of a wider area of nature protection. Part of this protected area was previously known as Old Park Wood SSSI. Barker Scar is protected because of the species rich grassland on top of cliffs and also because of the Carboniferous fossils contained within its limestone cliffs.

== Biology ==
Herbaceous plant species within the cliff top grassland include common knapweed, burnet saxifrage, dropwort, restharrow, salad burnet, wild thyme, common rock rose, squinancywort, common centaury, limestone bedstraw, common gromwell, green-winged orchid, and spring cinquefoil.

== Geology ==
The site is situated on cliffs of Carboniferous Limestone overlooking the surrounding saltmarsh. Fossils recorded in the Carboniferous limestone include brachipods (from the genera: Linoprotonia, Composita, and Megachonetes), corals (from the genera: Clisiophyllum, Haplolasma, Palaeosmilia, and Siphonodendron), foraminifera and conodonts ('jawless fish' from the genera: Apatognathus, Ligonodina, Spathognathodus, Neoprioniodus, and Hindeodella).
