= Seven Natural Wonders =

2005 BBC television series

- Country of origin: United Kingdom
- Original language: English

Original release
- Release: 3 May – 20 June 2005

Seven Natural Wonders is a television series that was broadcast on BBC Two from 3 May to 20 June 2005. The programme takes an area of England each week and, from votes by the people living in that area, shows the 'seven natural wonders' of that area in a programme.

== Episodes and locations ==
Rank	Area	Date	Presenter	Seven wonders covered
1	South West	3 May	Samantha Smith	Dartmoor, Jurassic Coast, St Michael's Mount, Exmoor, Isles of Scilly, The Lizard, Newquay Coast
2	Yorkshire & Lincolnshire	9 May	Paul Hudson	Malham Cove, the Three Peaks, Flamborough Head, Hornsea Mere, The Wash, Thorne and Hatfield Moors, Spurn Head
3	London	16 May	Bill Oddie	Islands in the River Thames, the London Plane, City Gardens, Hampstead Heath, London Wetland Centre, Epping Forest, Chislehurst Caves
4	The North	23 May	Chris Jackson	Lake District, River Wear, Whin Sill, Aysgarth Falls, River Tees, Holy Island, Morecambe Bay
5	The South	30 May	Aubrey Manning	The Needles, Lulworth Cove, Devil's Punch Bowl, The Ridgeway, Stokenchurch Gap, Finchampstead Ridges, Cuckmere Haven
6	The Midlands	6 June	Dominic Heale	Kinder Scout, Dovedale, Blue John Cavern, Creswell Crags, Sherwood Forest, Beacon Hill, Wenlock Edge
7	The West Country	17 June	Amanda Parr	Avebury, Symonds Yat, Cheddar Gorge, Bath Hot Springs, River Severn, Glastonbury Tor, Exmoor
8	South East	22 June	Kaddy Lee-Preston	White Cliffs of Dover, Seven Sisters, North Downs, Dungeness, Romney Marsh, Ecclesbourne Glen, Pegwell Bay

The series covered eight regions of England, having originated as a 'local' television project.

There was also a series, looking at a similar selection of 'man-made' wonders for each of eleven regions of England.
