= Scaleber Force =

Waterfall in North Yorkshire, England

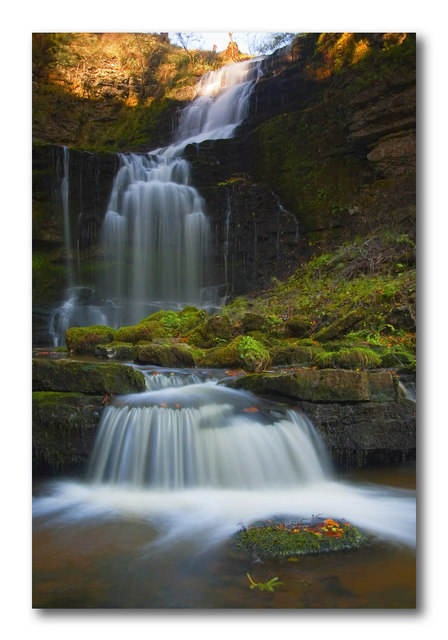
- Scaleber Force
- Interactive map of Scaleber Force
- Location: Settle, North Yorkshire, England
- Coordinates: 54°03′32″N 2°14′41″W
- Type: Cascade
- Total height: 40 feet (12 m) (Note: Some sources state height differently. Chrystal lists the waterfall as being 49 feet (15 m), and Speight suggests that the drops are 20 feet (6.1 m) and 30 feet (9.1 m).)
- Number of drops: 2
- Watercourse: Stockdale Beck; Long Preston Beck

Scaleber Force (also known as Scaleber Foss and Scaleber Waterfall), is a 40-foot (12 m) high waterfall on Stockdale Beck, later the Long Preston Beck, that feeds into the River Ribble between Settle and Long Preston in North Yorkshire, England. The waterfall is the result of geological faulting (part of the South Craven Fault) and is a popular tourist attraction.

== Toponymy ==
The waterfall is written variously as Scaleber Waterfall, Scaleber Force and Scaleber Foss. Though Foss is an Old Norse word meaning waterfall, from which Force is derived, the two are interchangeable in some sources. However, Ordnance Survey mapping shows it as Scaleber Force. The local pronunciation of Scaleber is Scallyber, though Scale-ber is often heard.

== Geology ==
Scaleber Force lies in a deep gorge incised into the fault scarp of the South Craven Fault, exposing either Late Arundian stage, or the Holkerian stage of Viséan age limestone. The gorge and the steep-sided valley of Long Preston Beck beyond were likely formed by the action of glacial meltwater carried along the margin of retreating ice sheets.

== Description ==
The waterfall is located on Stockdale Beck, and is part of Scaleber Wood, a 10-acre (4 ha) Woodland Trust site 1.5 miles (2.4 km) south east of Settle, and 2.5 miles (4 km) north of Long Preston. The waterfall is a popular destination and is accessible by walkers and bike-riders; one ride, known as the Settle Loop, has Scaleber Force as a waypoint. Along with Catrigg Force and various natural caverns, the foot access to the site is marketed locally as the Settle Caves and Waterfalls Walk. There is a long held belief that Edward Elgar was inspired by the site (and Catrigg Force), as he walked the Ribblesdale countryside often with his friend, Dr Buck, who lived in Settle. The site is popular with photographers and sightseers as water cascades over two sections with a plunge pool at the bottom.

== See also ==
- List of waterfalls
- List of waterfalls in England
