= Taylor Gill Force =

Waterfall in Cumbria, England, UK

Coordinates: 54°29′17″N 3°11′27″W

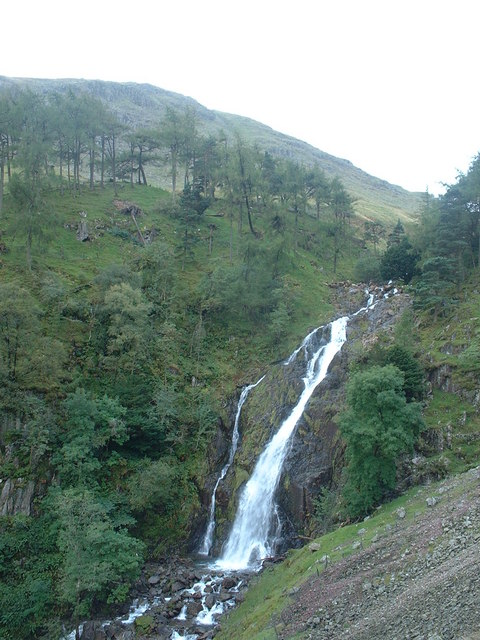
Taylor Gill Force

Taylor Gill Force is one of the highest waterfalls in the Lake District of England. It is situated in Seathwaite, Allerdale, near Seatoller in Cumbria.

== See also ==
- List of waterfalls
- List of waterfalls in England
