= Alan Benson (activist) =

British disability rights activists

Alan Richard Benson MBE (1969-17 December 2023) was a British disability rights activist.

== Biography ==
Born in Harlow to Joe and Marion Benson, both teachers, he grew up in Lincoln. Benson pursued a degree in philosophy, politics, and economics at Preston Polytechnic, which later became the University of Central Lancashire.

His career began in the IT field, transitioning into local government, where he met his wife, Yvonne. Benson also founded a company providing IT support to schools, and worked in various educational institutions across the UK.

Diagnosed with muscular dystrophy at a young age, Benson moved to London in 2012. There, he encountered significant challenges with the city's transportation system, which catalyzed his involvement in disability rights activism. Despite having no prior experience in activism, he became a prominent figure in the field, participating in media interviews and parliamentary discussions about transportation accessibility. Benson also blogged about accessibility in public transportation and shared information about it on social media.

Benson's advocacy in disability rights gained prominence in Richmond, where he began campaigning for improved disabled access. He co-founded the Campaign for Level Boarding in 2019, a group focusing on railway accessibility, and was recognized in the Shaw Trust Disability Power 100 list the same year. His efforts included an extensive survey of London's step-free access stations on the United Nations' International Day of Persons with Disabilities. In 2022, Benson was appointed an MBE for his services to disability rights. He was also awarded the Freedom of the Borough of Richmond.

Benson also served as a board member and chairman of Transport for All, advocating for improved transportation access, including efforts to make the Crossrail project more accessible to disabled individuals. He co-chaired the Department for Transport's inclusive transport stakeholder group, was deputy chair of London TravelWatch, and sat on the board of the South Western Railway.

Benson died in December 2023. Paying tribute, Transport for All called him an "astounding campaigner and ambassador for the disabled community”, London TravelWatch stated he was "held in deep affection by everyone" and managing director of passenger services at the Department for Transport called Benson "a truly committed and passionate champion of passengers". In October 2024, Benson was posthumously awarded the Lifetime Achievement Award at the National Transport Awards.
