= List of crossings of the River Swale =

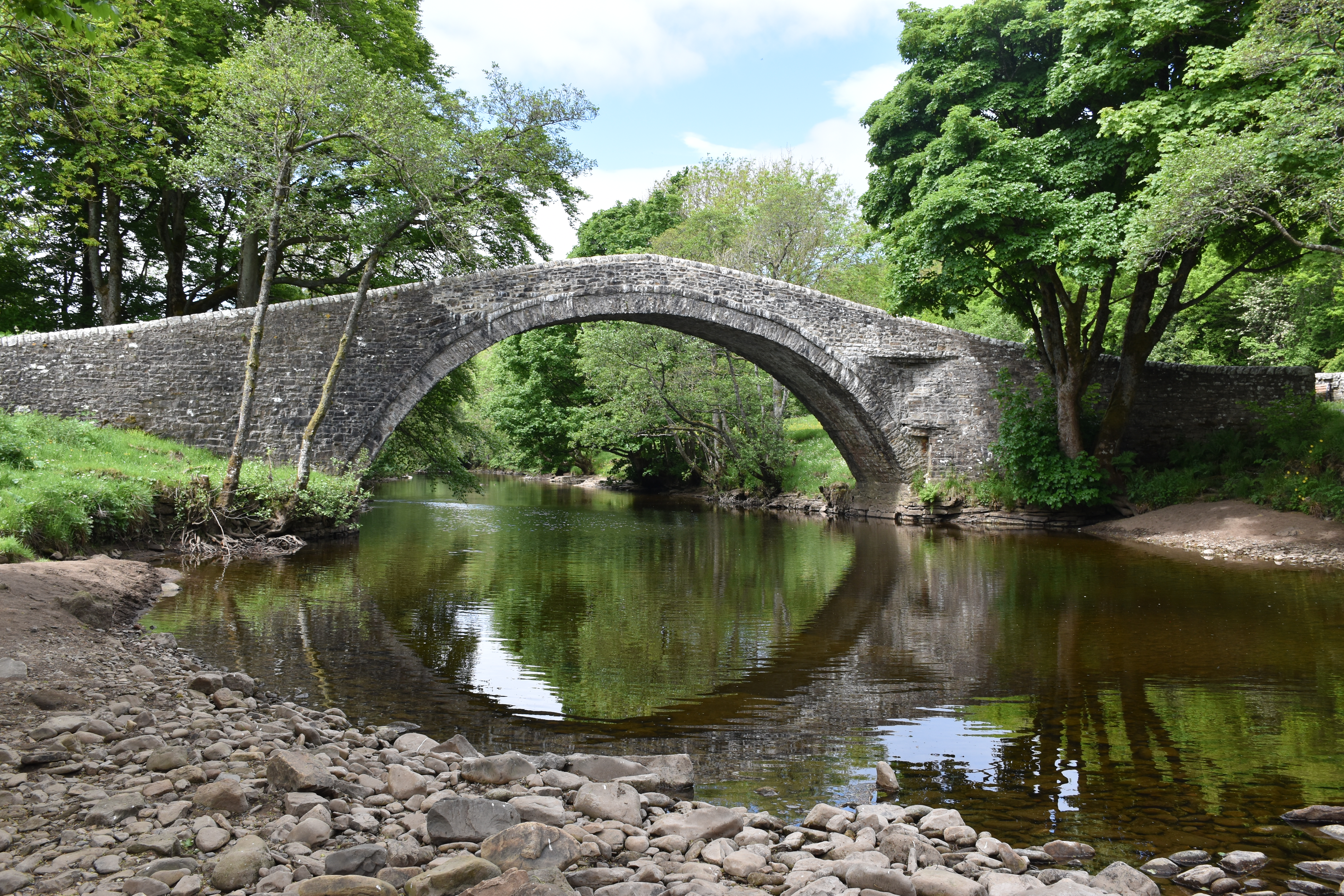
Ivelet Bridge

This is a list of current bridges and other crossings of the River Swale in North Yorkshire, and are listed downstream to the river's mouth. The River Swale is listed on mapping as starting where Birkdale Beck meets Great Sleddale Beck. (SE473604). The river flows for about 70 miles (110 km) before joining the River Ure near Myton-on-Swale, and then later, the Ure becomes the River Ouse. The list below includes permanent bridges and crossings; structures such as the conveyor belt linking the different areas of Killerby Quarry east of Catterick village are not included. Several bridges have been removed, notably railway bridges, such as the one which used to carry the Leeds & Thirsk Railway over the river just to the north of Topcliffe.

Hoggarth's Bridge was a two-arched structure which crossed the River Swale above Wain Wath Force, and it was swept away in 1899; its replacement, High Bridge, was built slightly downstream of the predecessor. The bridge at Gunnerside was swept away in a flood in 1890, and the suspension bridge at Reeth, first installed in 1925, was swept away in flooding in the year 2000. Flash floods are known on the river with the bridge at Grinton sometimes being flooded to a depth of 18 feet (5.5 m) so that only the tops of the bridge parapets can be seen in the floodwater.

As with other river locations in Northern England, especially in the old North Riding of Yorkshire, many bridges were built at the locations of fords across the river. One example of this is Scabba Wath Bridge. Wath comes from the Old Norse vað meaning ford.

== Crossings ==
Crossing	Location	Type	Co-ordinates	Date opened	Listing (Note: Either grade I, II* II, SM (scheduled monument), or N/A - not applicable)	Notes	Photo
Stone House Bridge	Stone House	Track	54.4037°N 2.2184°W	c. 1840	II		Bridge across River Swale
East Firs Bridge	East Firs	Track	54.4058°N 2.2103°W	c. 1840	II		Bridge over the River Swale
High Bridge	Whitsun Dale	Road	54.4074°N 2.2004°W	c. 1900	N/A	Hoggarth's Bridge, built c. 1790 was swept away in a flood in 1899. High Bridge was built a few years later in a position to the east of the old bridge. This is the furthest upstream public bridge on the Swale, the others being private.	High Bridge
Low Bridge	Keld	Road	54.4094°N 2.1899°W		N/A		Low_Bridge_near_Keld_-_geograph.org.uk_-_315307
Park Bridge	Keld	Road	54.4087°N 2.1773°W		N/A		Park Bridge and the River Swale
Pennine Way	Keld	Foot	54.4048°N 2.1618°W		N/A	Up until a flood in 1899, a packhorse bridge stood on this site.	The_footbridge_over_the_Swale_at_Keld_-_geograph.org.uk_-_1862102
Footbridge	Crackpot Hall	Foot	54.4004°N 2.1471°W		N/A		Estate bridge over the Swale below Kisdon Force (geograph 8307596)
Rampsholme Bridge	Ivelet	Foot	54.3828°N 2.1397°W		N/A	The older bridge here was also washed away in the 1899 flood.	Rampsholme_Bridge_over_the_infant_River_Swale_-_geograph.org.uk_-_459236
Ivelet Bridge	Ivelet	Road	54.3757°N 2.1046°W	Late 16th century	II*	Just to the north of the bridge is a coffin stone (a place to rest coffins) as it was on the Corpse Way between Muker and Grinton. Pevsner described it as the "..most romantic of the Swaledale bridges..."	Ivelet Bridge
Gunnerside Bridge	Gunnerside	Road	54.3756°N 2.0787°W	1892	N/A	Several bridges have been built here, the previous bridge washed away in a flood in January 1890.	Gunnerside_Great_Bridge_-_geograph.org.uk_-_6000952
Isles Bridge		Road	54.3728°N 2.0365°W		N/A		Isles_Bridge_-_geograph.org.uk_-_5559097
Scabba Wath Bridge	Low Row	Road	54.3804°N 1.9921°W	Mid 19th century	II		Scabba_Wath_Bridge_-_geograph.org.uk_-_6122119
Reeth Swing Bridge	Reeth	Foot	54.3857°N 1.9524°W	2002	N/A	The original structure was built in 1920; prior to this, the site was the location of stepping stones. The first bridge was swept away in a flood in September 2000, and is also known as Reeth Swing Bridge, though technically it is a suspension bridge.	Reeth_Swing_Bridge_-_geograph.org.uk_-_6090997
Grinton Bridge	Grinton	Road (B6270)	54.3822°N 1.9299°W	c. 1547	II		Grinton Bridge
Downholme Bridge	Downholme	Road	54.3879°N 1.8268°W	1674	II*	Also known as Marske New Bridge.	Downholme Bridge
Lownethwaite Bridge		Road (A6108)	54.4014°N 1.7761°W	1837	N/A		Lownethwaite Bridge
Richmond Howe bridge	Richmond	Foot	54.4027°N 1.7593°W		N/A		Footbridge across the River Swale
Green Bridge	Richmond	Road	54.4005°N 1.7403°W	1789	II*		Richmond Bridge
Mercury Bridge	Richmond	Road (A6136)	54.4040°N 1.7308°W	1846	II		Mercury Bridge, Richmond
Railway bridge	Easby	Railway	54.3941°N 1.7186°W	1846	N/A		Disused_railway_bridge_over_the_river_Swale_-_geograph.org.uk_-_447215
Unnamed bridge	Colburn	Foot	54.3922°N 1.6821°W		N/A		Old bridge over the River Swale
Agricola A1(M) bridge	Brompton-on-Swale	Road	54.3883°N 1.6558°W	2018	N/A	Replaced a structure from the original Catterick Bypass of 1959.	Bridge_over_the_River_Swale_-_geograph.org.uk_-_5929972
Catterick Military Railway bridge	Brough with St Giles	Foot	54.3890°N 1.6531°W	1922	N/A	Opened as a railway bridge to serve Catterick Garrison, closed in 1970, but now functions as a foot and pipeline crossing	Catterick Bridge
Catterick Bridge	Catterick	Road (A6136)	54.3892°N 1.6514°W	1422	II*	Before the stone bridge was built, a wooden bridge was in use to the west of the current bridge. Between 1915 and 1922, the bridge carried the Great North Road and the early Catterick Military Railway.	Catterick Bridge playwave
Great Langton Bridge	Great Langton	Road	54.3628°N 1.5541°W		N/A		Great_Langton_bridge_-_geograph.org.uk_-_144046
Morton railway bridge	Morton-on-Swale	Railway	54.3233°N 1.5107°W	1848	N/A	A four-span plate girder bridge on stone piers	Swale Bridge
Morton Bridge	Morton-on-Swale	Road (A684)	54.3207°N 1.5115°W	1803	II		Morton on Swale bridge
Railway bridge	Maunby	Railway	54.2700°N 1.4680°W	1852	N/A	Lattice girder bridge built by the Leeds Northern Railway.	Former railway bridge over the River Swale
Skipton Bridge	Skipton-on-Swale	Road (A61)	54.2125°N 1.4435°W	1781	II		Skipton_bridge_after_repairs_(2)_-_geograph.org.uk_-_2259557
Topcliffe bridge	Topcliffe	Road (A167)	54.1779°N 1.3915°W	1622	SM		Topcliffe Bridge
Bypass bridge	Topcliffe	Road (A168)	54.1742°N 1.3844°W	1977	N/A		A168_bridge_over_the_Swale_-_geograph.org.uk_-_8226570
Thornton Bridge	Thornton Bridge	Road	54.1367°N 1.3389°W	1865	II		Thornton Bridge
River Swale bridge	Brafferton	Railway	54.1270°N 1.3380°W	1847	N/A	Skew bridge of three arches, some 262 feet (80 m) in length. Built wide enough (23 feet 10 inches (7.26 m)) to accommodate two tracks, but only one was ever installed. Last train ran in 1964.	Old Railway Bridge at Brafferton
Footbridge	Brafferton	Foot	54.1236°N 1.3365°W	Unknown	N/A		Brafferton Bridge (geograph 8312331)
Myton Bridge	Myton-on-Swale	Road	54.0947°N 1.3348°W	1868	II	Iron single span bridge, restored in 2002.	Myton Bridge
