= Ivelet Bridge =

Bridge in Ivelet, North Yorkshire, England

Coordinates: 54°22′32″N 2°06′16″W

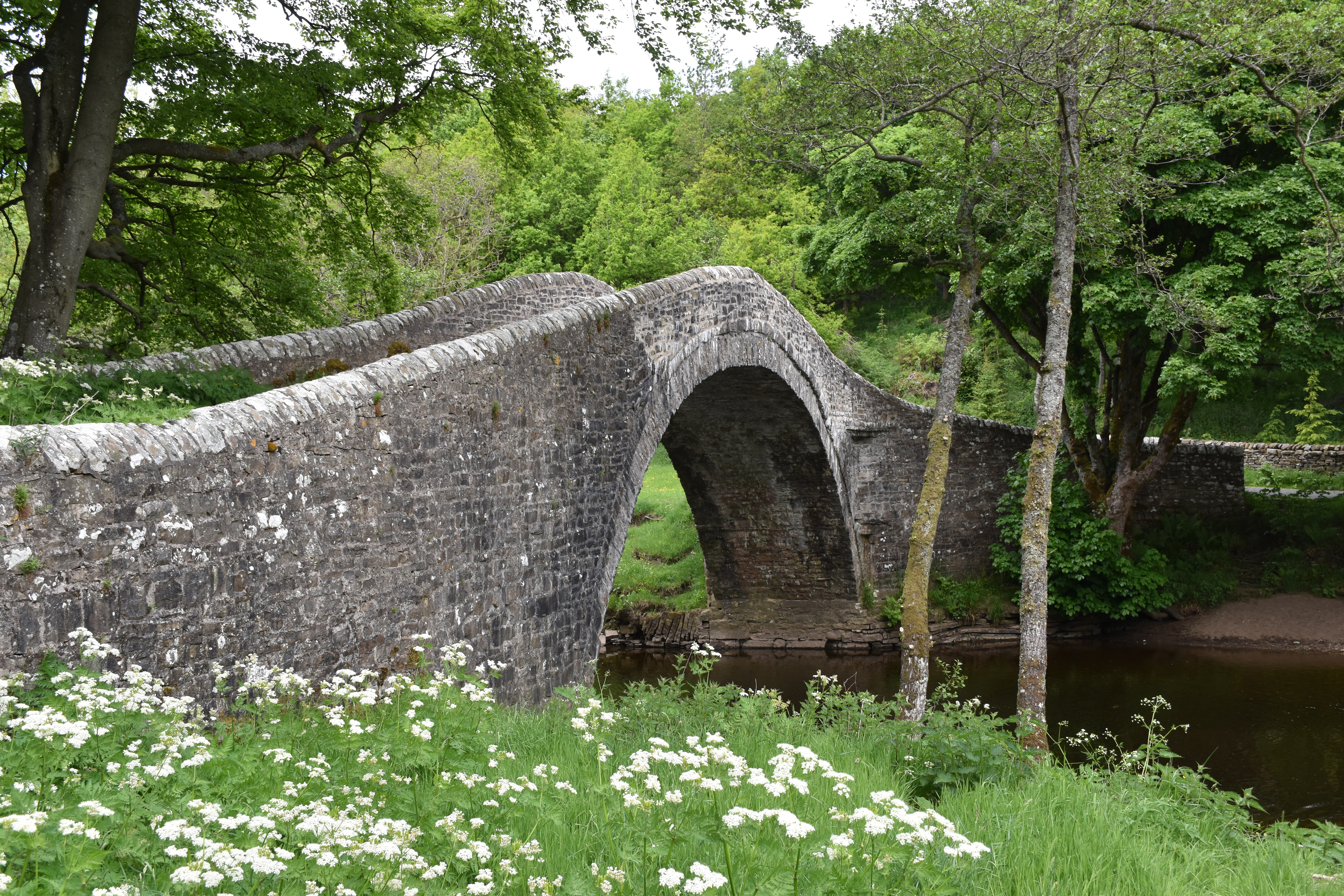
The bridge, in 2021

Ivelet Bridge is a historic structure in Ivelet, a hamlet in North Yorkshire, in England.

The packhorse bridge over the River Swale was constructed in the late 16th century. Nikolaus Pevsner describes it as "the most romantic of the Swaledale bridges. One arch, rising very high and never widened". It was grade II* listed in 1966. The bridge was damaged by a vehicle in 2012, but was repaired ahead of the 2014 Tour de France passing nearby.

The bridge is built of rubble, and consists of a single semicircular arch of voussoirs, surmounted by smaller stones forming a hood mould. The parapets have segmental coping, and they curve round at the northeast corner. Immediately to its northeast is a separately listed Mediaeval stone slab, said to have been used to rest coffins being transported to the Church of St Andrew, Grinton.

== See also ==
- Grade II* listed buildings in North Yorkshire (district)
- Listed buildings in Muker
- List of crossings of the River Swale
