= Corpse road =

Road historically used to transport corpses to cemeteries

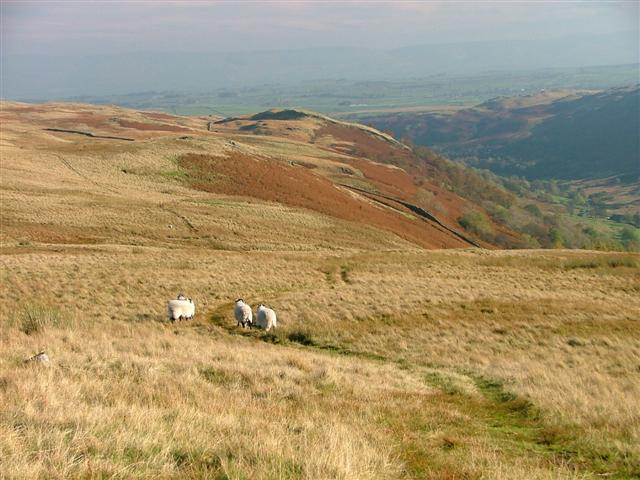
Corpse road in the Lake District

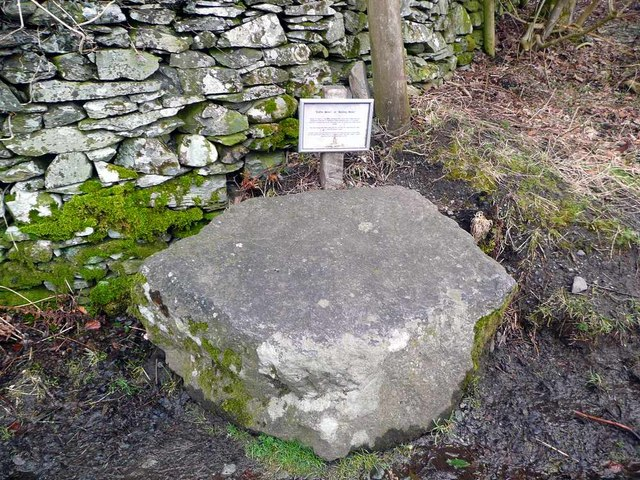
A coffin stone at Town End, in the Lake District

Corpse roads provided a practical means for transporting corpses, often from remote communities, to cemeteries that had burial rights, such as parish churches and chapels of ease. In Britain, such routes can also be known by a number of other names, including bier road, burial road, coffin line, coffin road, coffin walk, corpse way, funeral road, lych way, lyke way, and procession way. Such "church-ways" have developed a great deal of associated folklore regarding ghosts, spirits, wraiths, etc.

== Origins ==
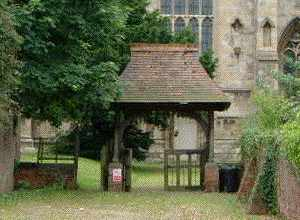
A traditional English lychgate

In late medieval times a population increase and an expansion of church building took place in Great Britain inevitably encroaching on the territories of existing mother churches or minsters. Demands for autonomy from outlying settlements made minster officials feel that their authority was waning, as were their revenues, so they instituted corpse roads connecting outlying locations and their mother churches (at the heart of parishes) that alone held burial rights. For some parishioners, this decision meant that corpses had to be transported long distances, sometimes through difficult terrain: usually a corpse had to be carried unless the departed was a wealthy individual. An example would be the funeral way that runs from Rydal to Ambleside in the Lake District where a coffin stone, on which the coffin was placed while the parishioners rested, still exists. Many of the 'new' churches were eventually granted burial rights and corpse roads ceased to be used as such.

== Church-way paths ==
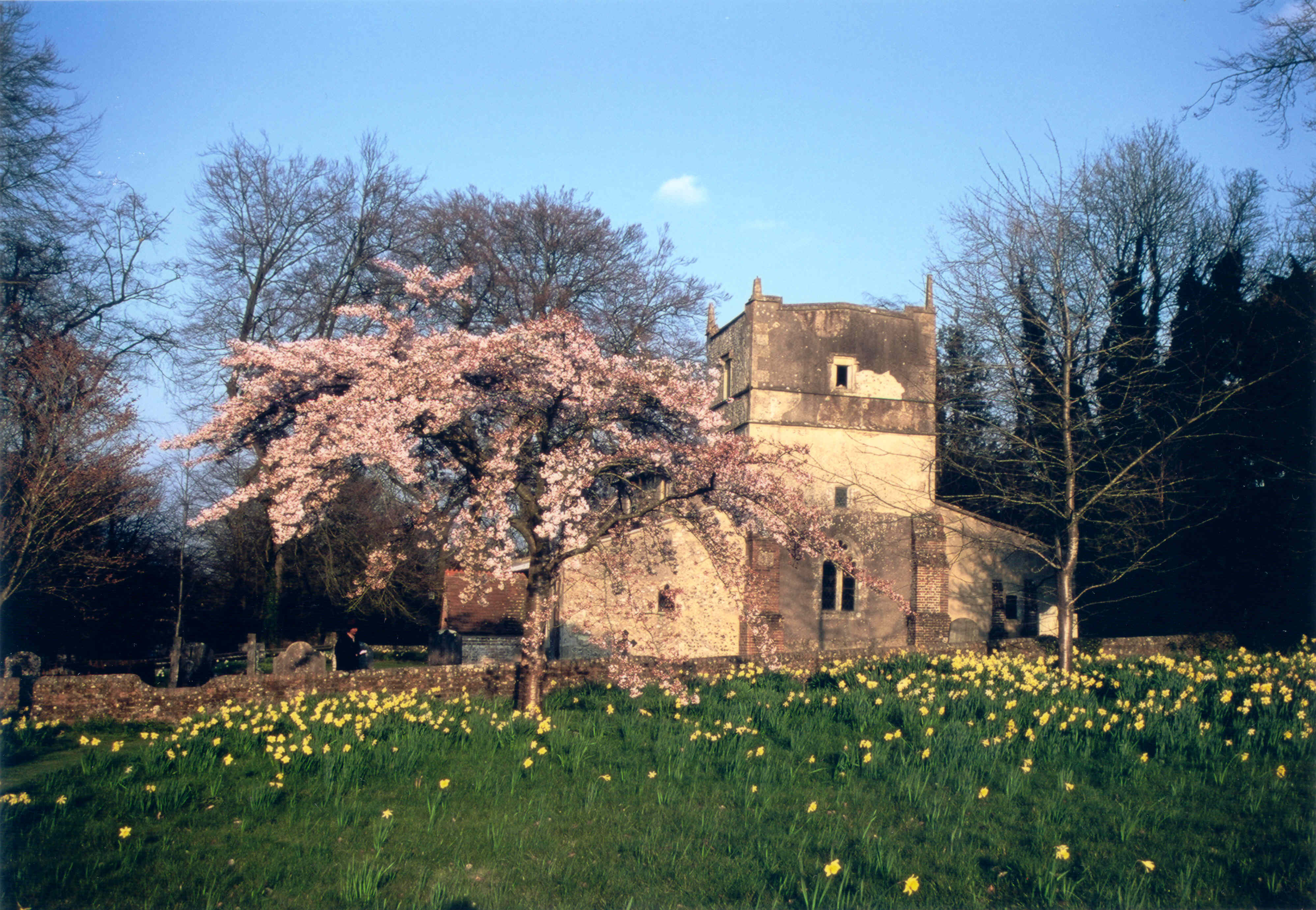
An old church and cemetery in Wiltshire

Many of the corpse roads have long disappeared, while the original purposes of those that still survive as footpaths have been largely forgotten, especially if features such as coffin stones or crosses no longer exist. Fields crossed by church-way paths often had names like "Church-way" or "Kirk-way Field", and today it is sometimes possible to plot the course of some lost church-ways by the sequence of old field names, local knowledge of churches, local legends and lost features of the landscape marked on old maps, etc. One of the oldest superstitions is that any land over which a corpse is carried becomes a public right of way.

An example of a corpse road or way is that of the church of St Peter and Paul at Blockley, in Gloucestershire, which held the burial right to the inhabitants of the hamlets Stretton-on-Fosse in Warwickshire, where there was a chapel which became a rectory in the 12th century, and Aston Magna, where there was a chapel which was merely a chantry. All 'tithes' and 'mortuaries', however, came to the parish church of Blockley, to which church the people of Stretton and Aston were committed to carry their deceased for burial. The corpse road from Aston to Blockley churchyard is over two miles (3 km) long and crosses three small streams en route. The corpse road from Stretton to Blockley runs for some four miles (6 km) and crosses two streams.

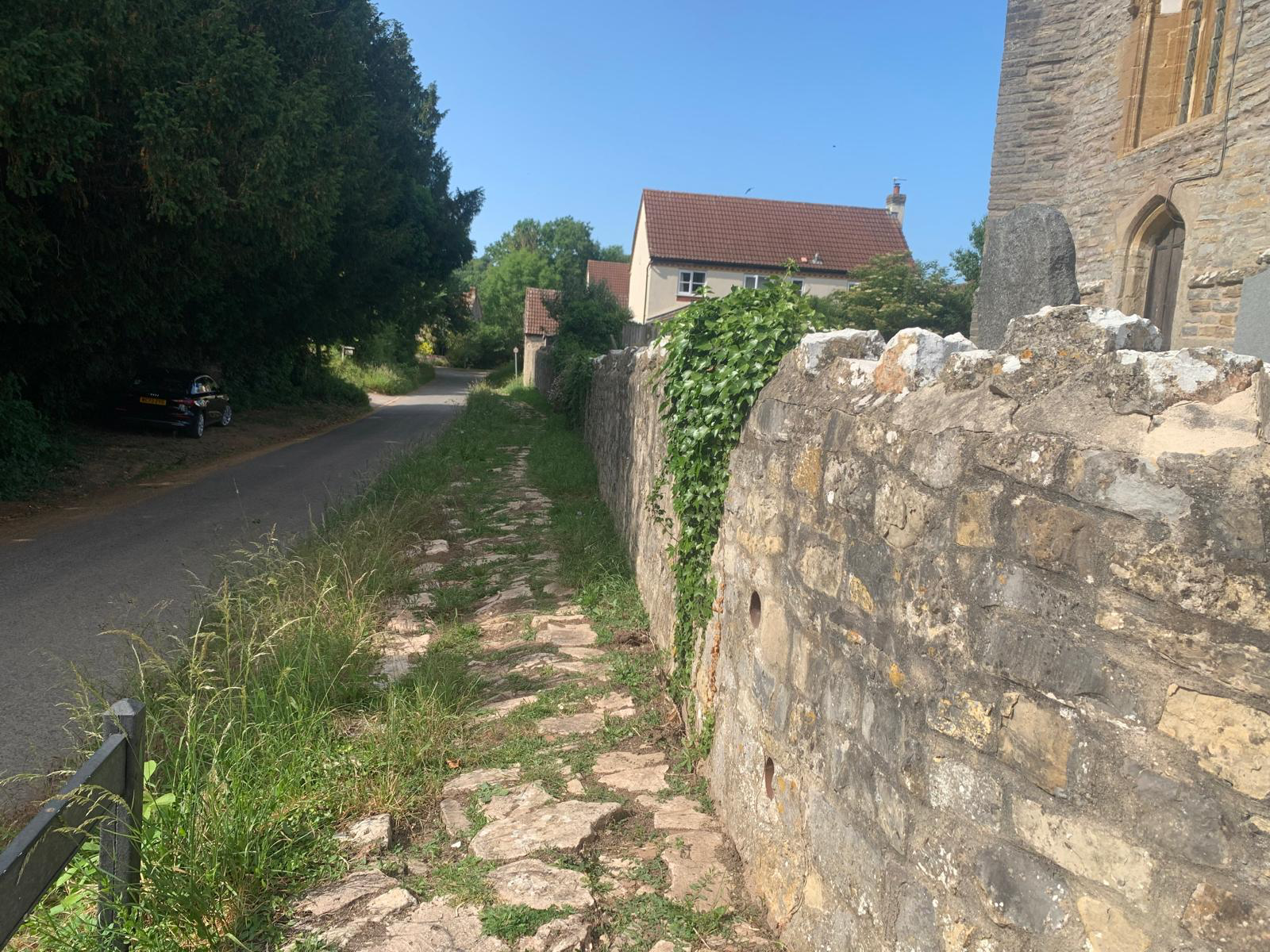
Coffin Walk next to St. Francis church, on Ford Lane, Stawell, Somerset

One of the best preserved coffin walks is in Stawell in Somerset. Although some of the original path is on a private estate, the end of the coffin walk alongside the church of St Francis still links up with a public footpath. This footpath is believed to be the rest of the coffin walk which takes one up to the old Roman Road (A39) between Bridgwater and Street. Many local footpaths to also link up to this old road.

== Characteristics of corpse roads ==
=== The spirits of the dead ===
The essence of deep-rooted spirit lore is that supposed spirits of one kind or another – spirits of the dead, phantasms of the living, wraiths, or nature entities like fairies move through the physical landscape along special routes. In their ideal, pristine form, at least, such routes are conceived of as being straight, having something in common with ley lines. By the same token, convoluted or non-linear features hinder spirit movement i.e. labyrinths and mazes.

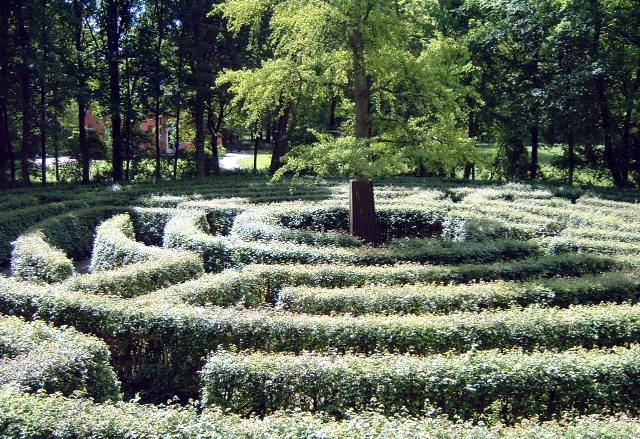
Hedge maze in the "English Garden" at Schönbusch Park, Aschaffenburg, Germany

Spirits or ghosts were said to fly along on a direct course close to the ground, so a straight line connecting two places was kept clear of fences, walls, and buildings to avoid obstructing the flitting spectres. The paths would run in a straight line over mountains and valleys and through marshes. In towns, they would pass the houses closely or go right through them. The paths end or originate at a cemetery; therefore, such a path or road was believed to have the same characteristics as a cemetery, where spirits of the deceased thrive.

The corpse roads or ways were left unploughed and it was considered very bad luck if for any reason a different route had to be taken.

=== Corpse candles and other related phenomena ===
A corpse candle or light is a flame or ball of light, often blue, that is seen to travel just above the ground on the route from the cemetery to the dying person's house and back again, and is particularly associated with Wales. A corpse fire is very similar as the name comes from lights appearing specifically within graveyards where it was believed the lights were an omen of death or coming tragedy and would mark the route of a future funeral, from the victim's house to the graveyard, where it would vanish into the ground at the site of the burial. The appearance was often said to be on the night before a death.

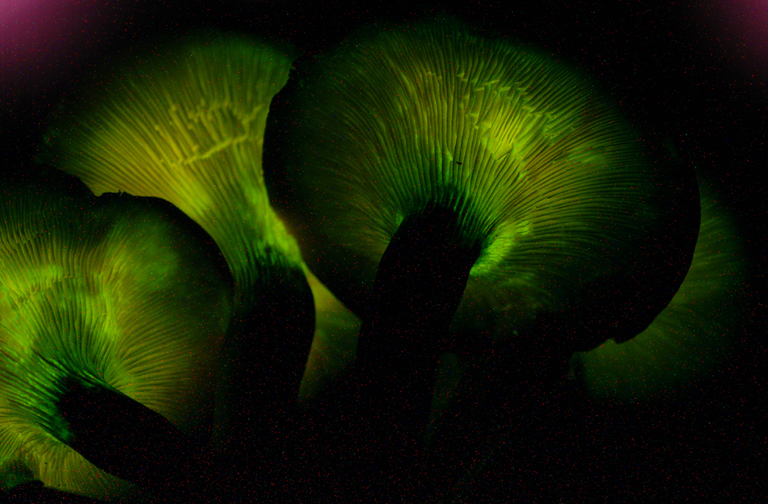
Omphalotus olearius, bioluminescent fungus

Among European rural people, especially in Gaelic, Slavic, and Germanic folklore, the will-o'-the-wisps are held to be mischievous spirits of the dead or other supernatural beings attempting to lead travellers astray (compare Puck). Sometimes they are believed to be the spirits of unbaptized or stillborn children, flitting between heaven and hell. Other names are Jack O' Lantern, or Joan of the Wad, Jenny Burn-tail, Kitty wi' the Whisp, or Spunkie.

Anybody seeing this phenomenon might merely have been seeing, without knowing, fungal bioluminescence (foxfire). It is also possible those who have observed corpse candles may have been witnessing the effect of methane gases produced by decomposing organic material found in swamps, marshlands, and bogs.

=== A Midsummer Night's Dream ===
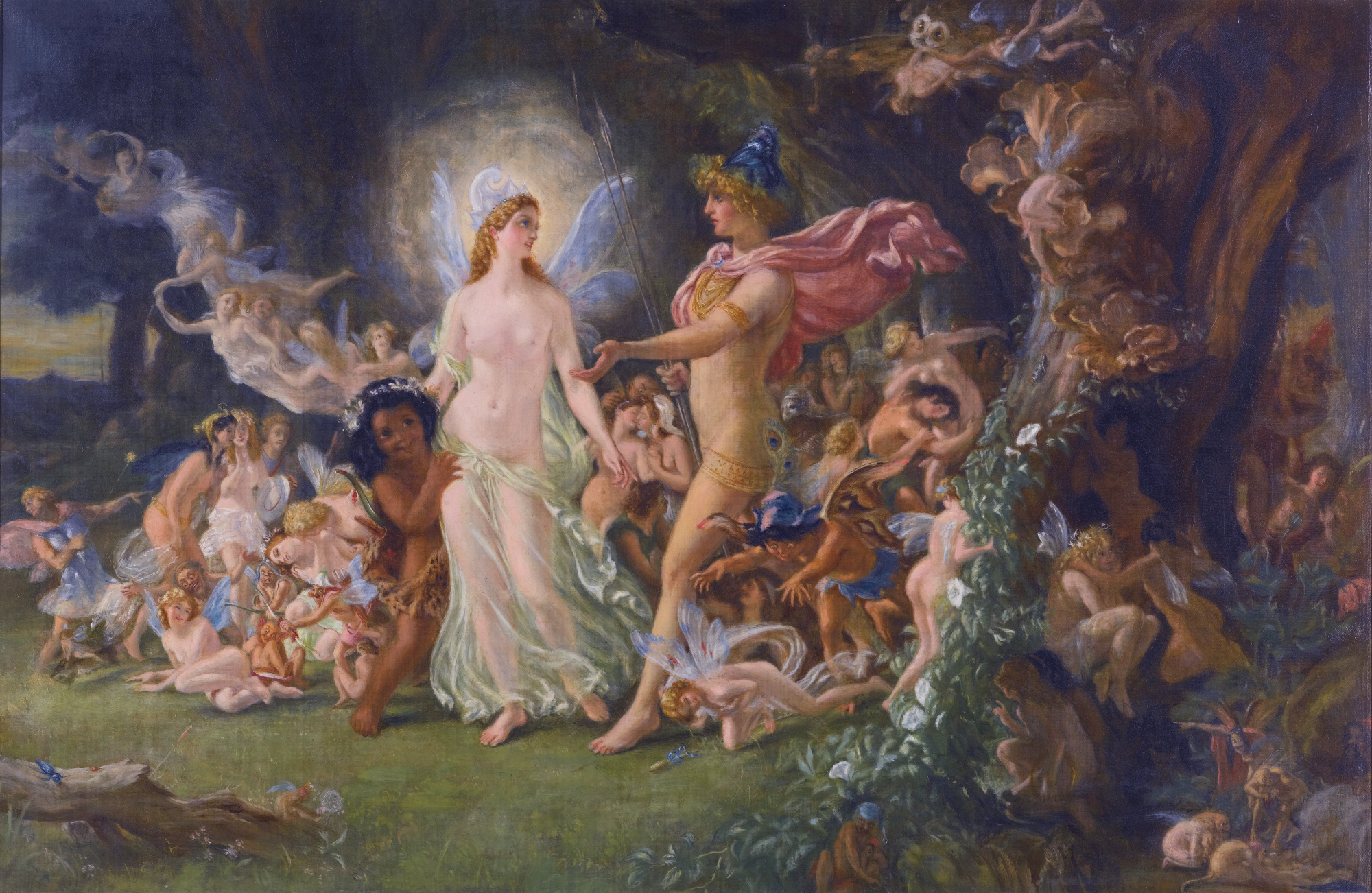
The Quarrel of Oberon and Titania, by Joseph Noel Paton

In Shakespeare's A Midsummer Night's Dream, Puck says:

Now it is the time of night,
That the graves all gaping wide,
Every one lets forth his sprite,
In the church-way paths to glide.

Puck suggests a secret history of these routes, for unsurprisingly they attracted long extant folk lore, running not only through the physical countryside but also through the invisible geography, the 'mental terrain', of pre-industrial country-folk. Shakespeare's lines leave little doubt that the physical corpse roads came to be perceived as being spirit routes, taking on qualities which lingered in the folklore of his age and which he incorporated into his play knowing that it would be a familiar concept.

=== Spirit roads and archaeological features ===
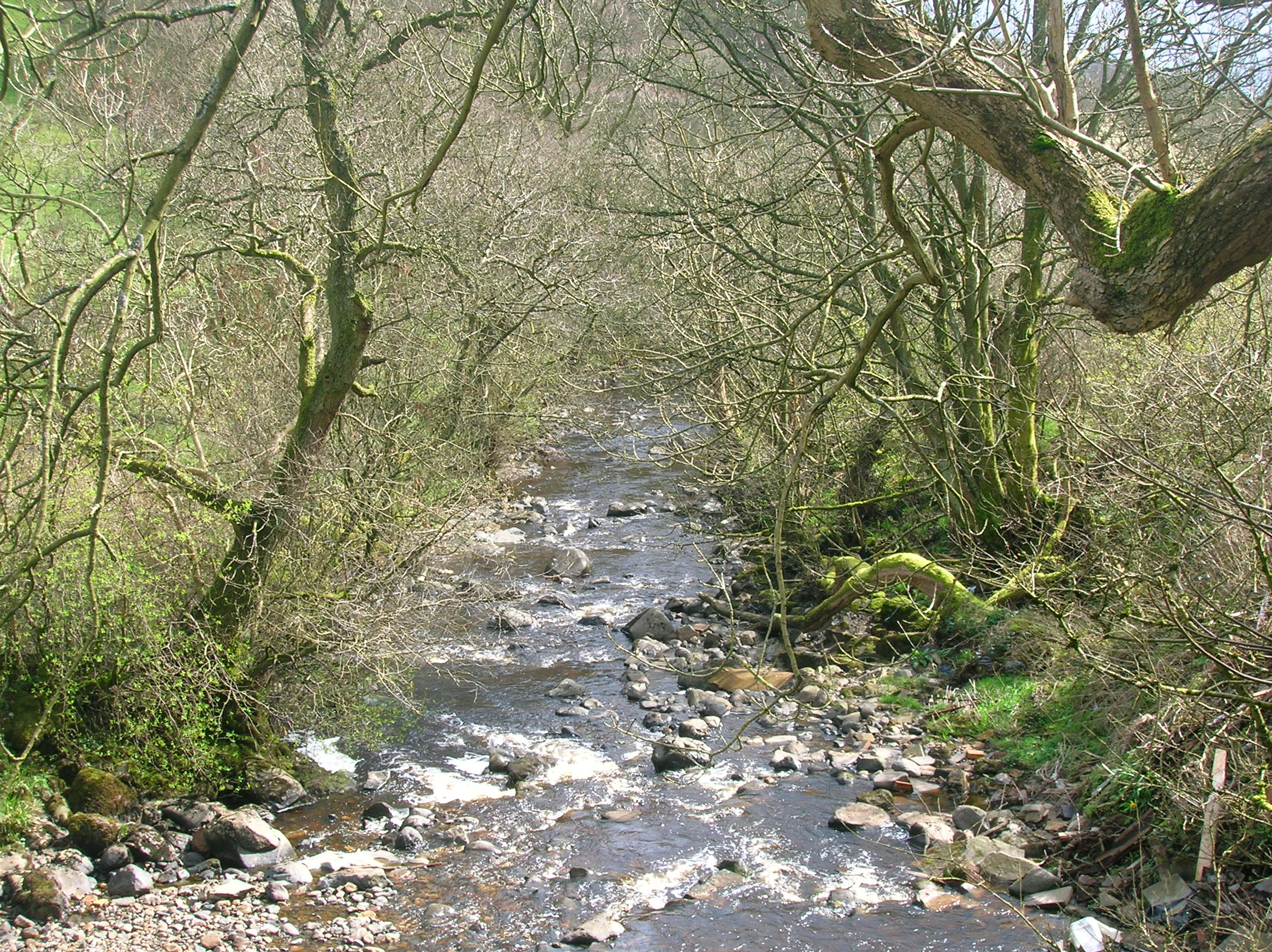
Spirits could reportedly not cross running water such as the Glen Water near Darvel in Scotland.

The spirit roads, such as the church-ways, were always conceived of as being straight, but the physical corpse roads of the United Kingdom vary as much as any other path. Corpses were conveyed along defined corpse roads to avoid their spirits returning to haunt the living. It was a widespread custom, for example, that the feet of the corpse be kept pointing away from the family home on its journey to the cemetery.

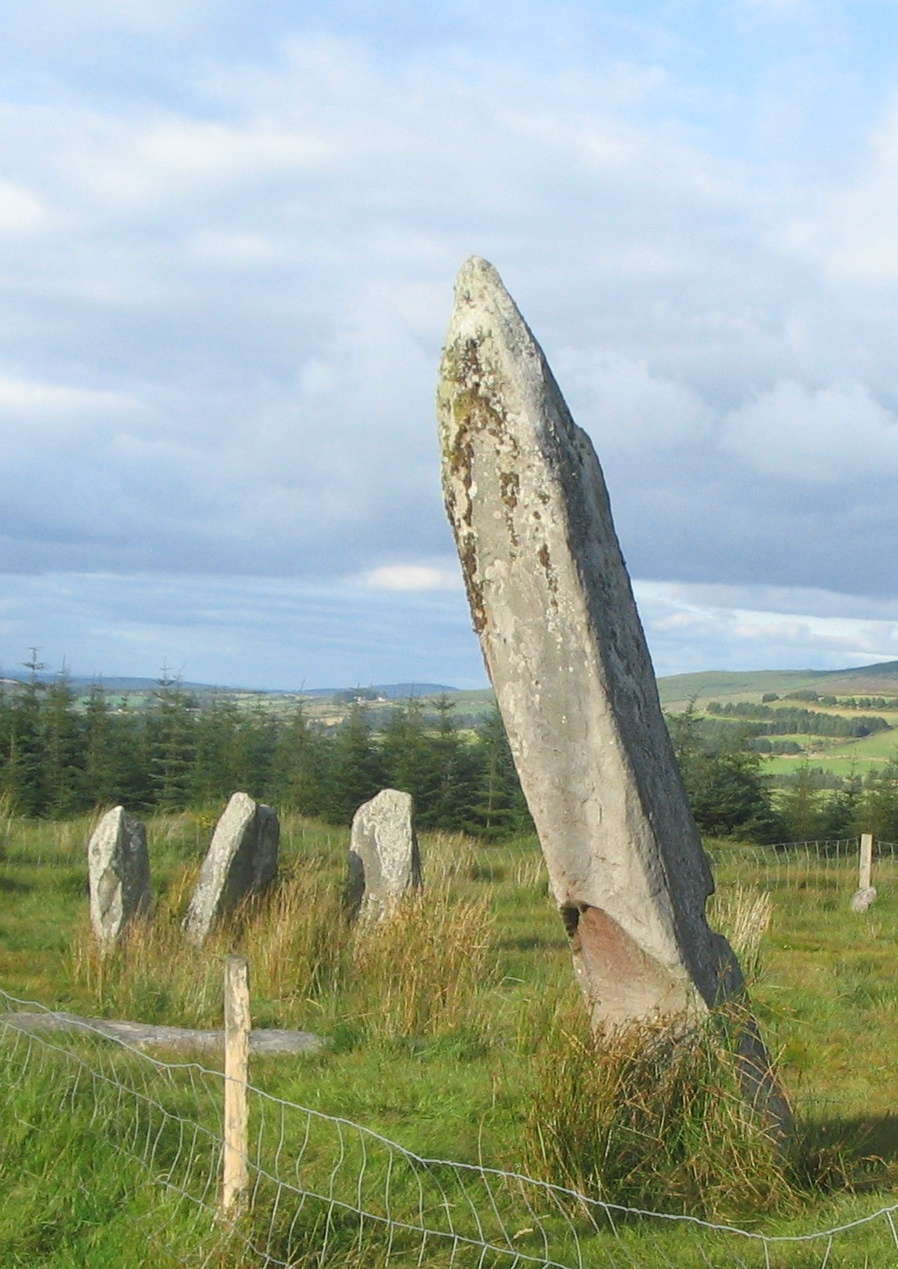
View of the megalithic complex at Knocknakilla in County Cork, with a stone row shown behind a 3.5 m portal stone

Other minor ritualistic means of preventing the return of the dead person included ensuring that the route the corpse took to burial would take it over bridges or stepping stones across running water which spirits could not cross, stiles, and various other 'liminal' ("betwixt and between") locations, all of which had reputations for preventing or hindering the free passage of spirits. The living took pains to prevent the dead from wandering the land as lost souls or animated corpses, for the belief in revenants (ghosts) was widespread in mediæval Europe.

People using the corpse roads assumed that they could be passages for ghosts. The ancient spirit folklore that attached itself to the medieval and later corpse roads also may have informed certain prehistoric features. In Britain, for instance, Neolithic earthen avenues called cursuses link burial mounds: these features can run for considerable distances, even miles, and are largely straight, or straight in segments, connecting funerary sites. The purpose of these avenues is imperfectly understood, but some kind of spirit-way function may be one reasonable explanation. Similarly, some Neolithic and Bronze Age graves, especially in France and Britain, are associated with stone rows, like those at Merrivale on Dartmoor, with intriguing blocking stones at their ends.

Homer Sykes in Mysterious Britain says that the 'holed' Cornish 'Tolvan' stone was used to block a now lost ancient burial chamber, and suggests that the hole allowed a way in for funeral purposes and a passage out for the spirits of the dead.

In Britain, around 4000–6000 years old, bog causeways constructed from timber have been excavated. The "Sweet Track" in Somerset, is one of the oldest and the excavations along this old straight track indicated that one of its uses was for transporting the dead.

== Associated legends and beliefs ==
Some country-folk claim that if a dead body is carried across a field it will thereafter fail to produce good crop yields. Throughout the United Kingdom and Europe it is still believed that touching a corpse in the coffin will allow the departed spirit to go in peace to its rest, and bring good luck to the living.

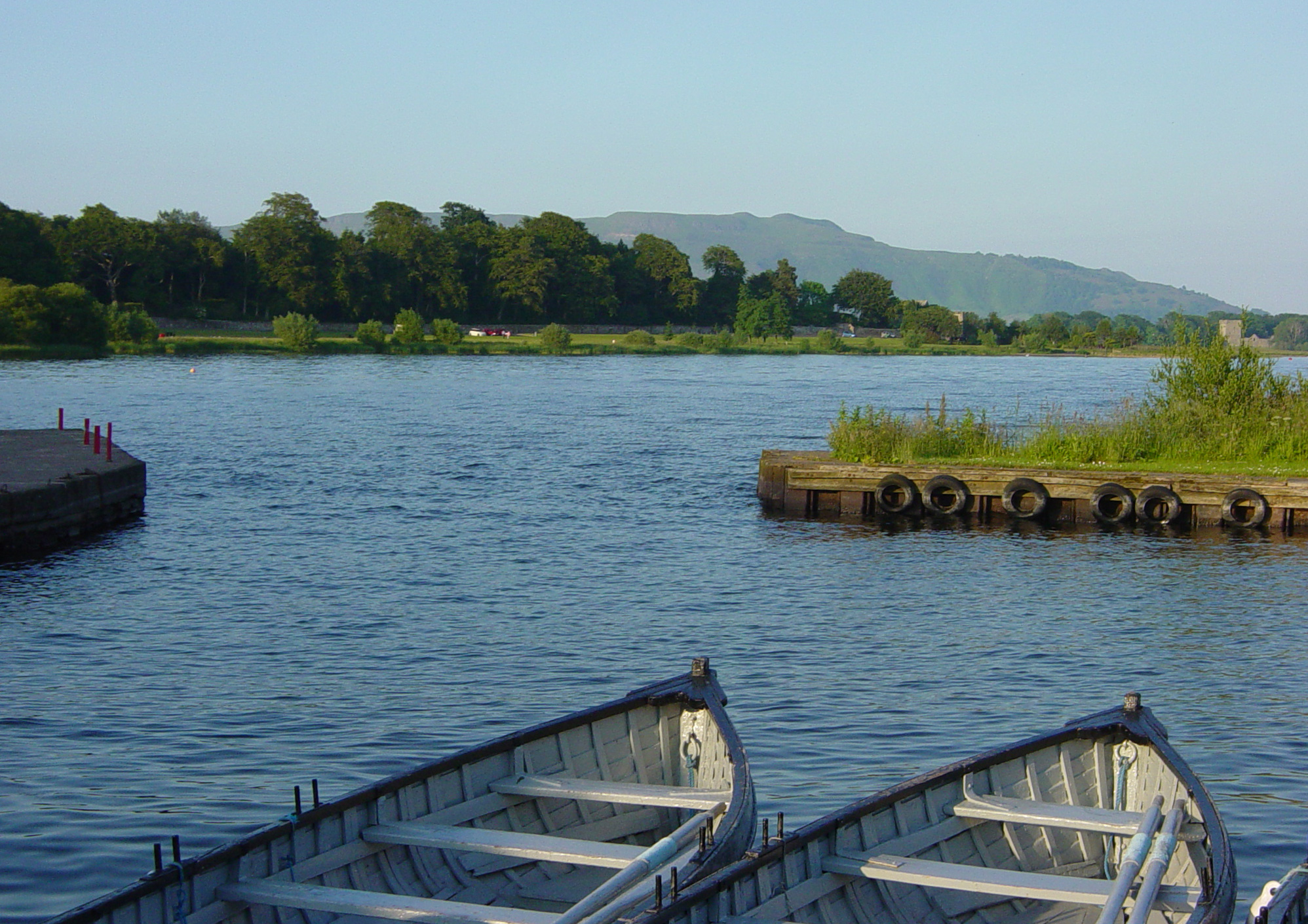
View east across Loch Leven from Kinross

Phantom lights are sometimes seen on the Scottish cemetery-island of Mun in Loch Leven and traditionally such lights were thought to be omens of impending death; the soul also was thought to depart the body in the form of a flame or light.

In Ireland, the féar gortach ("hungry grass"/"violent hunger") is said to grow at a place where an unenclosed corpse was laid on its way to burial. This is thought to be a permanent effect and anyone who stands on such grass is said to develop insatiable hunger. One such place is in Ballinamore and was so notorious that the woman of the nearby house kept a supply of food on hand for victims.

On Aranmore Island off Ireland each passing funeral would stop and erect a memorial pile of stones on the smooth rocky surface on the roadside enclosure.

The existence of specific coffin stones, crosses or lychgates on church-ways, suggests that these may have been specially positioned and sanctified so as to allow the coffin to be placed there temporarily without the chance of the ground becoming in some way tainted or the spirit given an opportunity to escape and haunt its place of death.

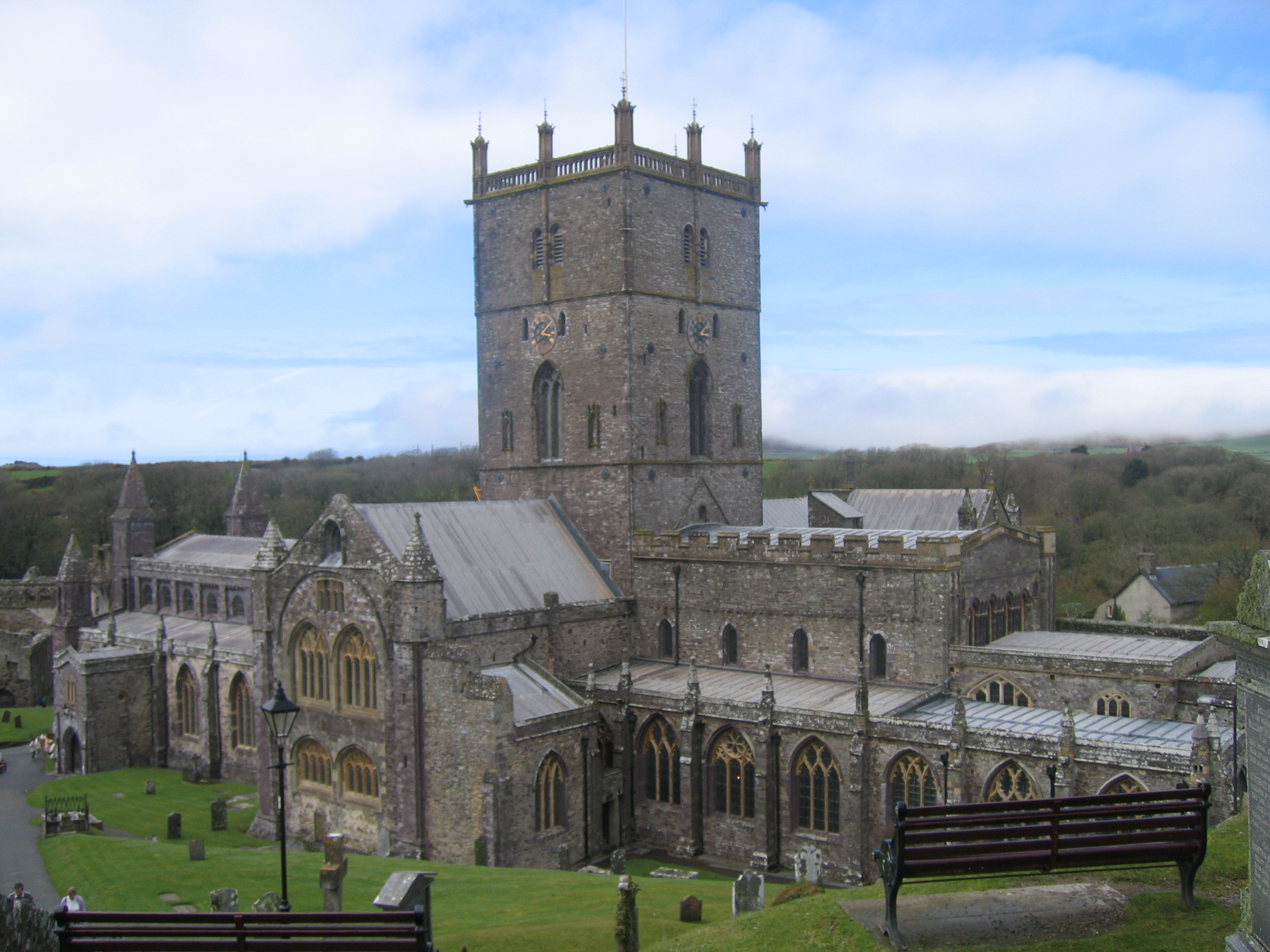
St David's Cathedral from the gatehouse

Gerald of Wales (Giraldus Cambrensis) in the 13th-century relates the strange story of a marble footbridge leading from the church over the Alan rivulet in Saint Davids. The marble stone was called 'Llechllafar' (the talking stone) because it once spoke when a corpse was carried over it to the cemetery for interment. The effort of speech had caused it to break, despite its size of ten feet in length, six in breadth and one in thickness. This bridge was worn smooth due to its age and the thousands of people who had walked over it, however the superstition was so widely held that corpses were no longer carried over it. This ancient bridge was replaced in the 16th century and its present location is not known.

Another legend is that Merlin had prophesied the death on Llechllafar of an English King, conqueror of Ireland, who had been injured by a man with a red hand. King Henry II went on pilgrimage to Saint David's after coming from Ireland, heard of the prophecy and crossed Llechllafar without ill effect. He boasted that Merlin was a liar, to which a bystander replied that the King would not conquer Ireland and was therefore not the king of the prophecy. This turned out to be true, for Henry never did conquer the whole of Ireland.

A Devon legend tells of a funeral procession heading across Dartmoor on its way to Widecombe and the burial ground, carrying a particularly unpopular and evil old man. They reach the coffin stone and place the coffin on it while they rest. A beam of light strikes the coffin, reducing it and its contents to ashes and splitting the coffin stone. The party believes that God did not wish to have such an evil man buried in a cemetery.

The villagers in Manaton in Devon used to carry coffins three times round the churchyard cross, much to the irritation of the vicar, who opposed the superstition. Upon being ignored, he had the cross destroyed.

The 'Lych way' is a track lying to the south-west of Devil's Tor on Dartmoor. The dead from remote moorland homesteads were taken along this track to Lydford church for burial. Many reports have been made of monks in white and phantom funeral processions seen walking along this path.

Childe's Tomb on Dartmoor is the site of the death of Childe who was caught in a snowstorm, killed and disembowelled his horse and climbed inside for shelter, but still froze to death. He left a message to say that the first person to bury him would get his lands at Plymstock. The greedy monks of Tavistock buried him and claimed the lands. The ghosts of monks carrying a bier have been seen at Childe's tomb.

An old woman at Fryup in Yorkshire was well known locally for keeping the "Mark's e’en watch" (24 April), as she lived alongside a corpse road known as the "Old Hell Road". In this 'watch', typically a village seer would hold a vigil between 11 pm and 1 am on St. Mark's Day, in order to look for the wraiths of those who would die in the following year.

The Lyke Wake Walk in North Yorkshire is not a corpse road but takes its name from the Lyke Wake Dirge.

=== Crossroads ===
Places where tracks intersect are considered dangerous and are believed occupied by special spirit-guardians because they are places of transition where the world and the underworld intersect. The Celtic god Lugh indicated the right road at such places and was a guide to the traveler's footsteps. The god of the dead was the divinity of the crossroad and later Christian crosses were erected at such places.

Crossroads divination was conducted in Britain and other parts of Europe, and is associated with the belief that the Devil could be made to manifest at such intersections. Crossroads lore also includes the idea that spirits of the dead could be "bound" (immobilized or rendered powerless) at crossroads, specifically suicides and hanged criminals, but also witches, outlaws and gypsies. The belief was that since straight routes could facilitate the movement of spirits, so contrary features like crossroads and stone or turf labyrinths could hinder it. An example of a crossroad execution-ground was the famous Tyburn, London, which stood on the spot where the Roman road to Edgware crossed the Roman road heading west out of London.

== Excluding the spirits of the dead ==
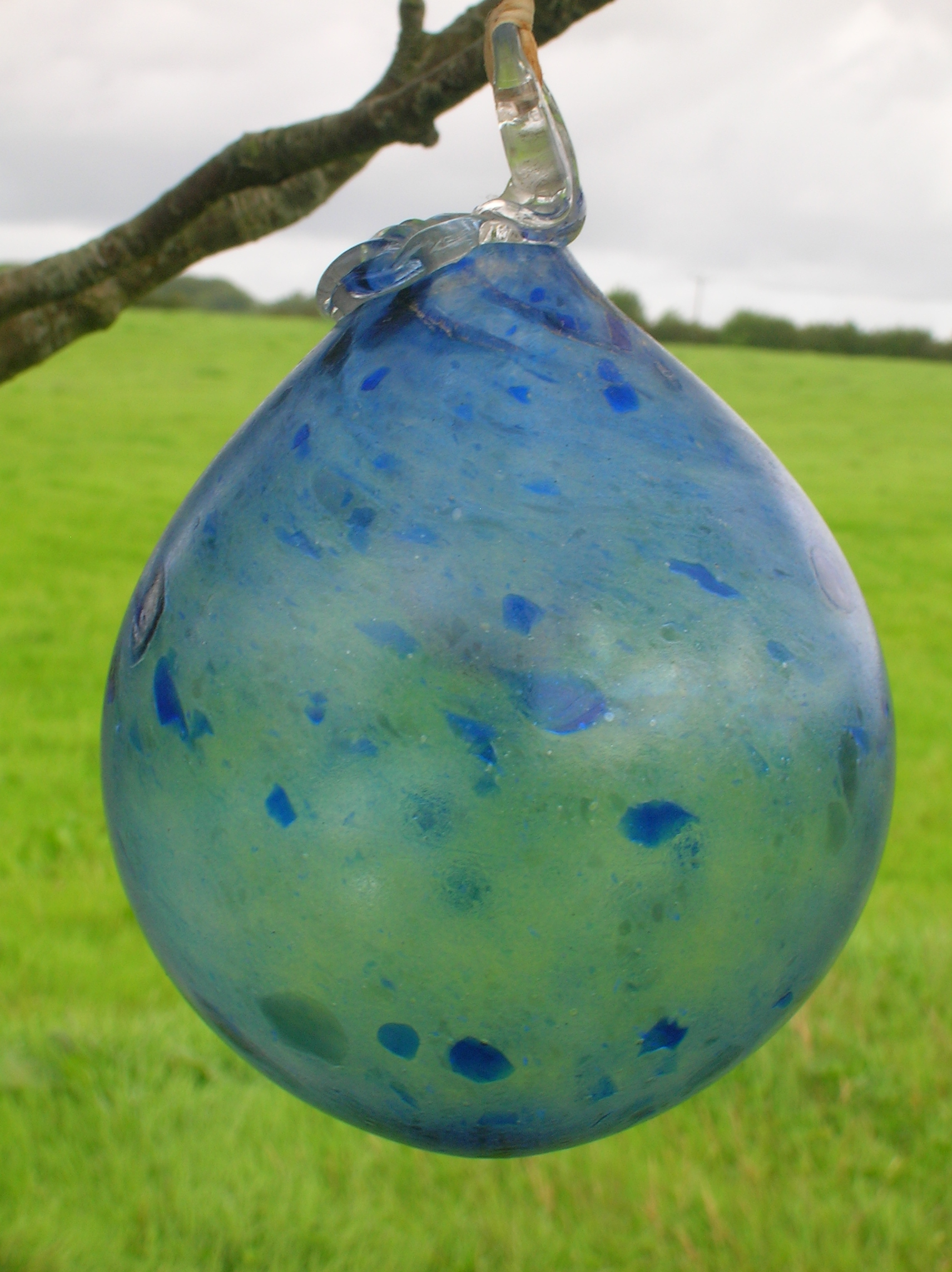
A witch ball on a Rowan tree in Lambroughton, Ayrshire

A labyrinth

This was part of a broader fear of spirits that might flit into dwellings. Witch bottles were common throughout Europe – bottles or glass spheres containing a mass of threads, often with charms entangled in them. Its purpose was to draw in and trap evil and negative energy directed at its owner. Folk magic contends that the witch bottle protects against evil spirits and magical attack, and counteracts spells cast by witches, also forestalling the passage into habitations of witches flying about at night. A witch ball was much the same; however, a more light-hearted belief was that the witch saw her distorted face in the curved glass and was frightened away. The term witch ball is probably a corruption of watch ball because it was used as a guard against evil spirits.

If straight lines did not hinder the passage of spirits, then convoluted or tangled "lines" could ensnare them and ancient stone and turf labyrinths, found in many parts of Europe and Scandinavia, could serve the purpose of capturing evil spirits.

== Corpse paths worldwide ==
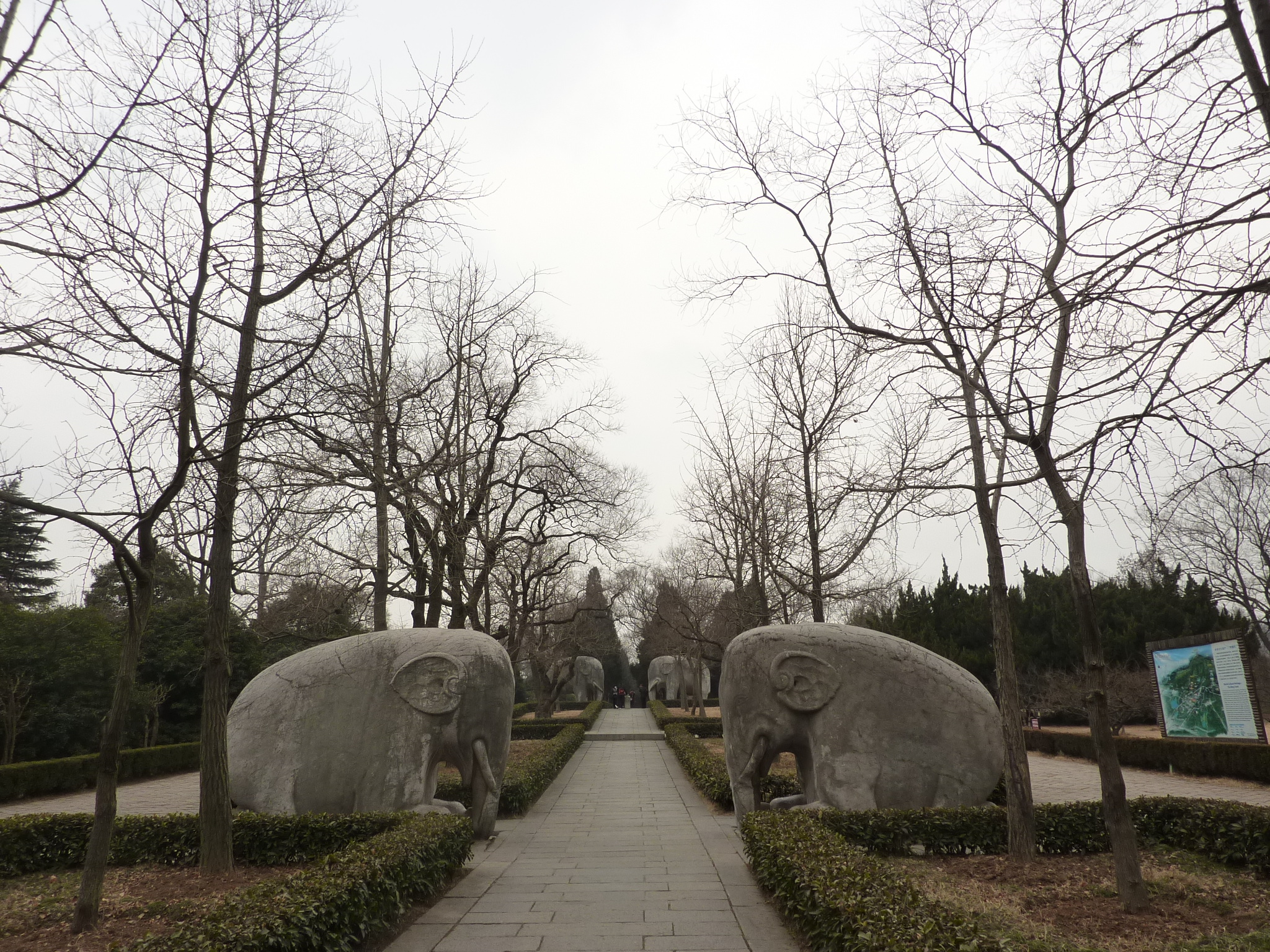
Stone elephants along the spirit way of the Hongwu Emperor at Ming Xiaoling

During several dynasties of imperial China, the pathway to the burial mound of an emperor or a high dignitary would be lined with the statues of real and fantastic animals and of the civil and military officials, and would be known as the shendao (spirit way) At major imperial mausolea, such as Ming Xiaoling in Nanjing or the Ming Dynasty Tombs near Beijing, the spirit way could be several hundreds of meters, sometimes over a kilometer, long.

A straight Viking cult or Corpse road at Rosaring, Uppland, Sweden, was unearthed by archaeologists. The body of the dead Viking chieftains were drawn along it in a ceremonial wagon to the grave site. The Netherlands had the Doodwegen ("deathroads") or Spokenwegen ("ghostroads"), converging on medieval cemeteries, some surviving in straight section fragments to this day.

In the Arenal area of Costa Rica, NASA surveys detected straight paths running considerable distances through the mountainous rainforest. Upon closer examination, these routes were found to date from CE 500–1200 and had been constructed as corpse paths, along which bodies were carried to burial.

== See also ==
- Mass path – Rural track
