= Grinton Bridge =

Historic bridge in North Yorkshire, England

Coordinates: 54.3821°N 1.9299°W

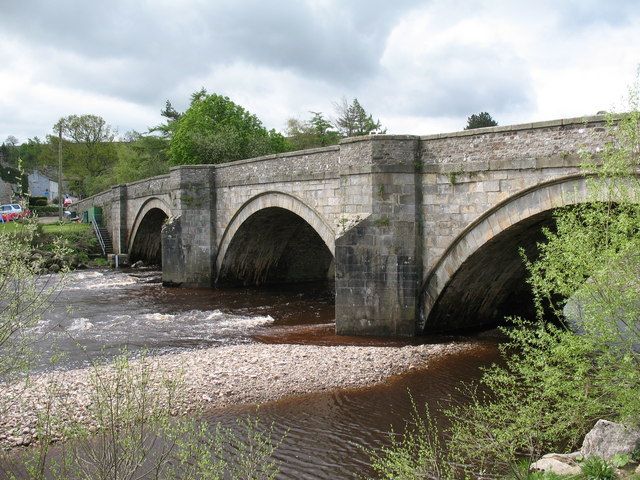
The bridge, in 2007

Grinton Bridge is a historic bridge over the River Swale in Grinton, North Yorkshire, a village in England.

There is a record of a bequest left in 1547, to fund the reconstruction of the bridge, and it is possible that the northern arch survives from this period. However, by 1631 the bridge was in poor repair, and in 1659 £40 was allocated for its repair, followed by a further £30 in 1675, with the remainder of the upstream side dating from this period. In 1797, John Carr widened the bridge to the downstream side, and added voussoirs and cutwaters on the upstream side. The parapets were replaced in the 19th century. The 2014 Tour de France crossed the bridge, but in July 2019 it was largely destroyed in a flood. It was rebuilt, and remains grade II listed.

The bridge carries the B6270 road over the River Swale. It is built of stone and consists of three semicircular arches, the northernmost being more pointed on the upstream side. The bridge has triangular cutwaters rising to canted buttresses containing pedestrian retreats, voussoirs, a string course and parapets.

== See also ==
- Listed buildings in Grinton
- List of crossings of the River Swale
