= Lychgate =

Gateway covered with a roof in a Christian churchyard

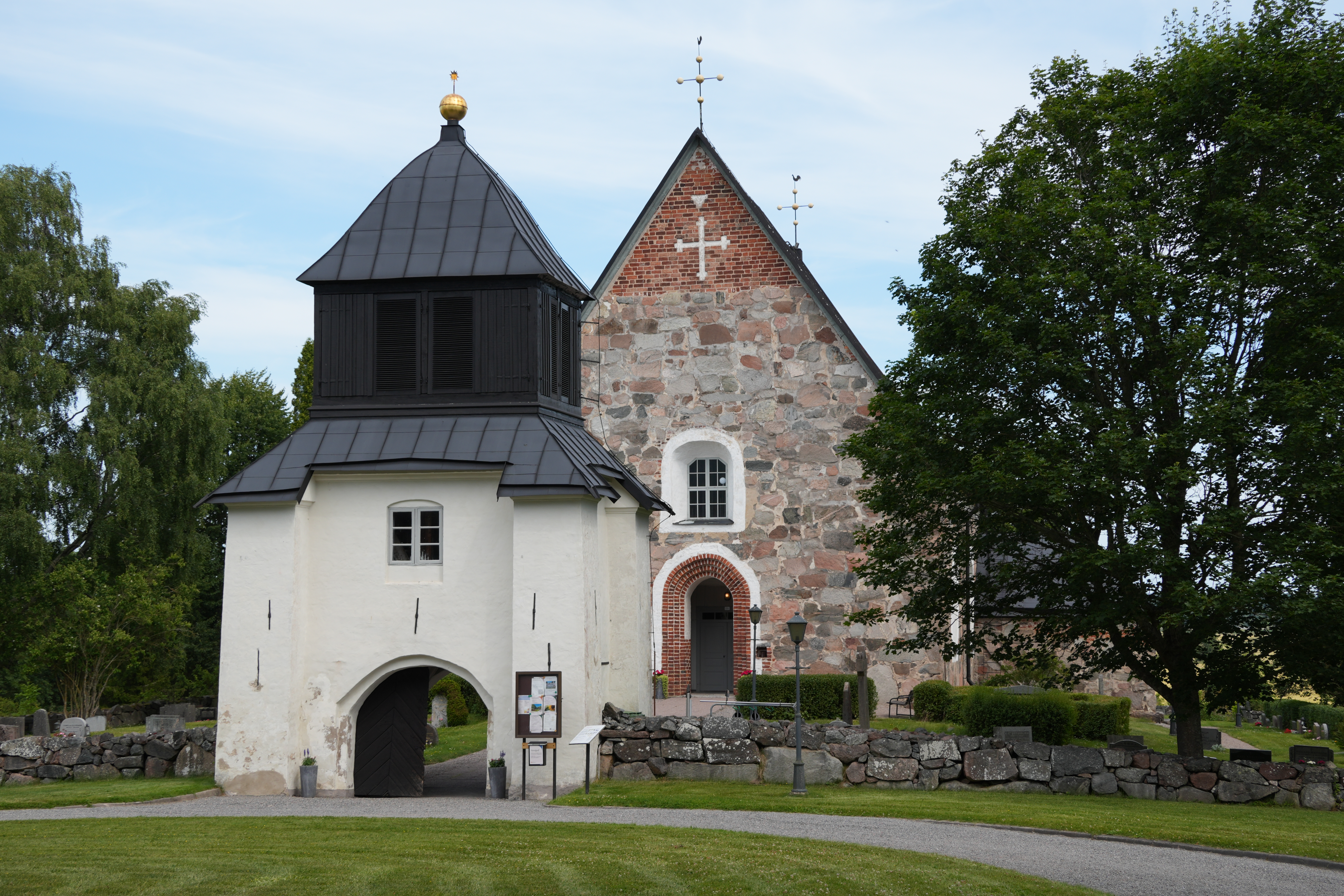
The lychgate of Skederid Church (Evangelical-Lutheran) in Norrtälje, Sweden

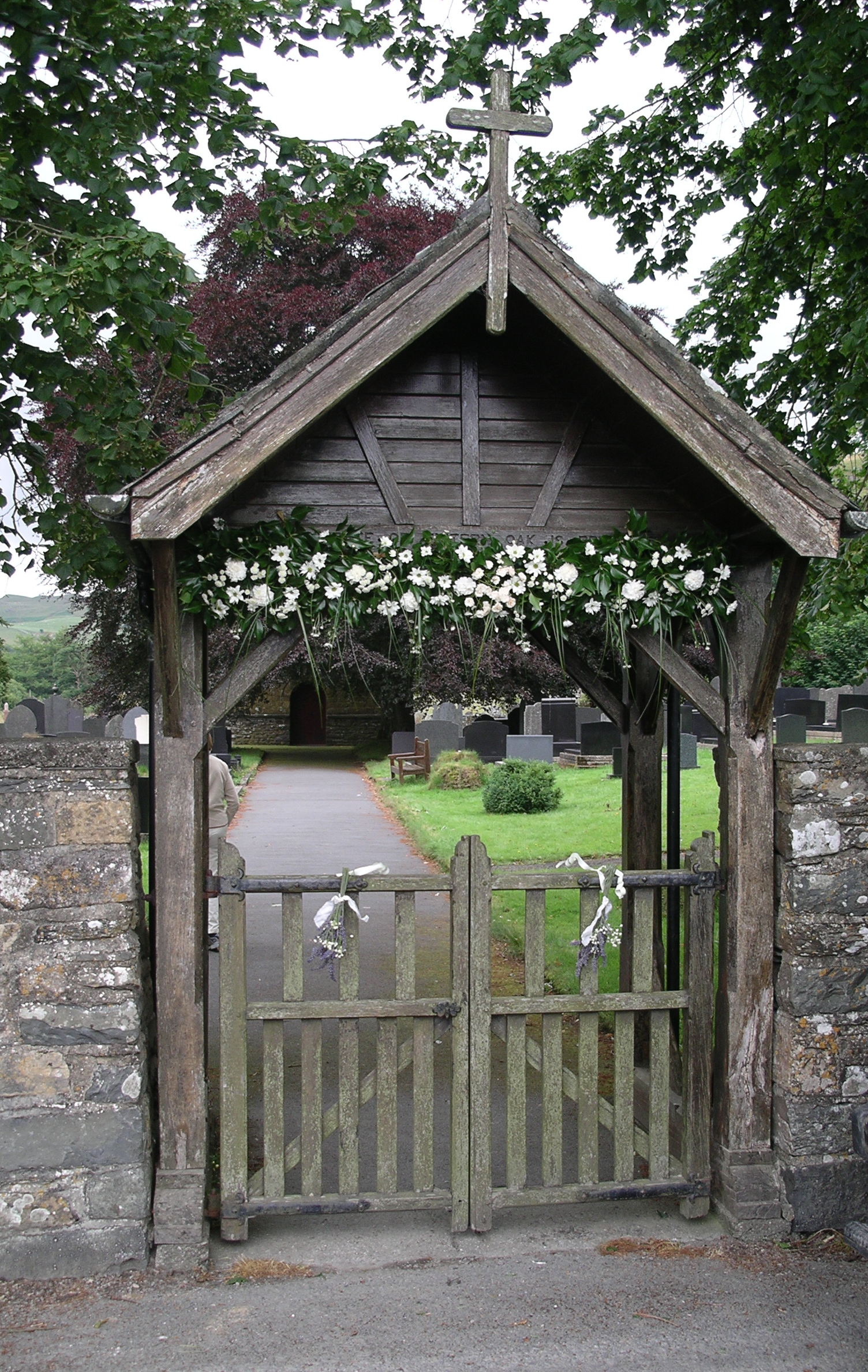
A lychgate in Ceredigion, Wales, decorated for a wedding

A lychgate (from Old English līc, corpse) or resurrection gate is a covered gateway found at the entrance to a traditional Christian church or churchyard. Lychgates are prominent in the British Isles, Canada, the Upland South and Texas in the United States, Australia, New Zealand, South Africa, Norway, and Sweden.

== Etymology ==
The word lych survived into modern English from the Old English or Saxon word for "corpse", mostly as an adjective in particular phrases or names, such as lych bell, the hand-bell rung before a corpse; lych way, the path along which a corpse was carried to burial (this in some districts was supposed to establish a right-of-way); lych owl, the screech owl, because its cry was a portent of death; and lyke-wake, a night watch over a corpse (see Lyke-Wake Dirge).

It is cognate with the modern German Leiche, Dutch lijk and lichaam, West Frisian lyk and Swedish lik, all meaning "corpse".

Lychgate in Swedish is called stiglucka, literally "step hatch". The explanation is that the gate was split horizontally so that you could step over the lower part without having to open it. Therefore, one can also guess another meaning of lych (lyke, luke, lucka "hatch, gap") from the Scandinavian languages.

== Description ==
Lychgates consist of a roofed porch-like structure over a gate, often built of wood. They usually consist of four or six upright wooden posts in a rectangular shape. On top of this are a number of beams to hold a pitched roof covered in thatch or wooden or clay tiles. They can have decorative carvings and in later times were erected as memorials. Under the roof there is a gate, usually with two panels that meet in the middle, and the gate is offset away from the Church so that the bier or coffin rests in the centre of the structure, under cover, and inside the Churchyard, in hallowed ground.

They sometimes have recessed seats on either side of the gate itself, for the use of pall-bearers or vigil watchers.

Lychgates followed a somewhat predictable pattern, though great variations in form could be seen. Typically, they were gable or hipped roofed, often with benches where mourners could sit, or with a lych-stone, coffin-stool or trestle, upon which a coffin could be rested.

The most common form of lychgate is a simple shed composed of a roof with two gabled ends, covered with tiles or thatch. At Berrynarbor, Devon, there is a lychgate in the form of a cross, while at Troutbeck, Westmorland, there are three lychgates to one churchyard. Some elaborate gates have chambers over them. In Texas and the South of the US, lychgates are simpler in construction, usually consisting of a steel or wooden span with a sign showing the name of the burial space.

=== Dates of surviving lychgates ===
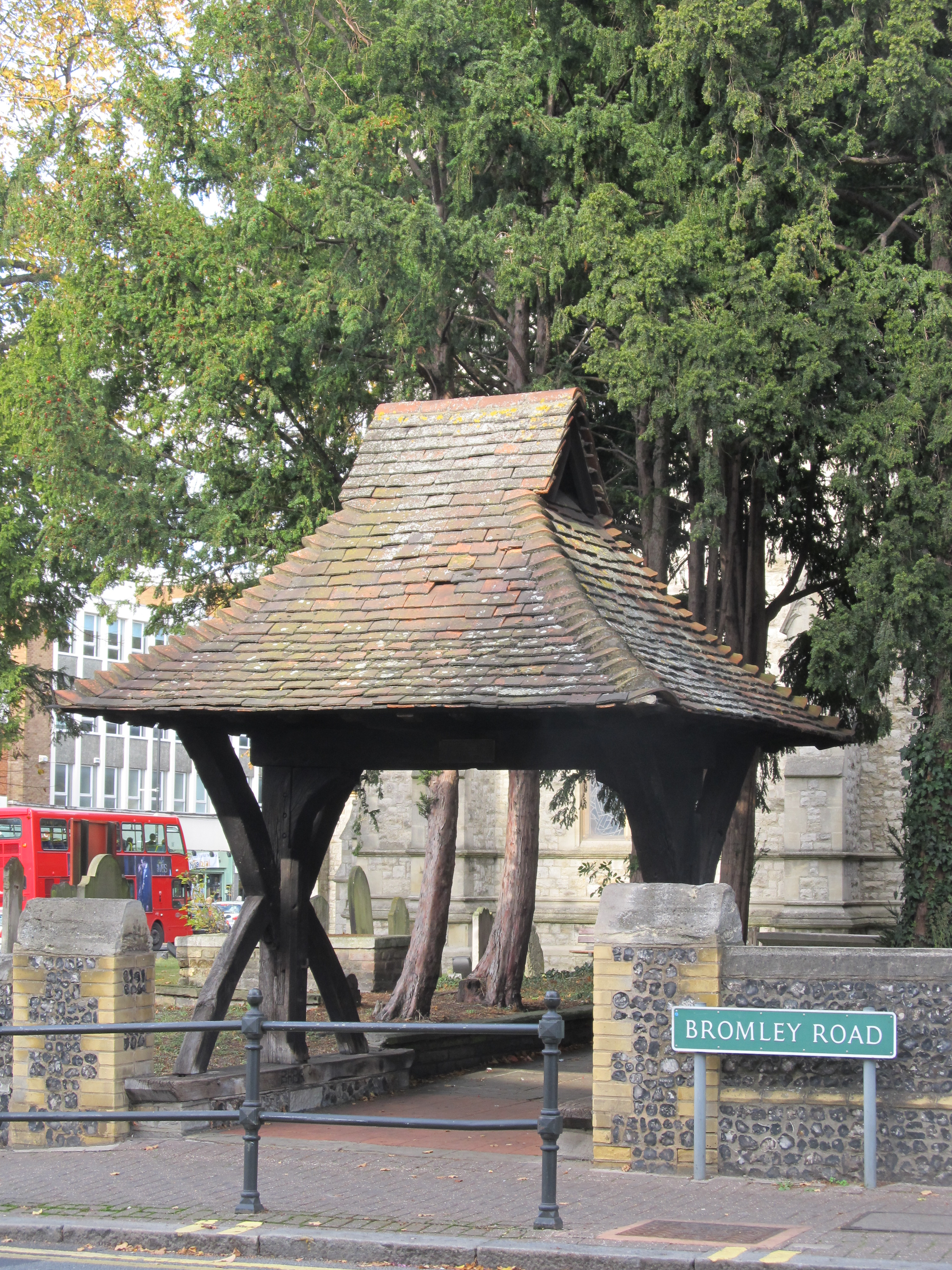
Lychgate, St George's church, Beckenham, south London, said to be the oldest in England

Most were built from around the mid-15th century although some date from earlier, including the 13th-century lychgate of St George's churchyard in Beckenham, South London, claimed to be the oldest in England. After World War I a number of lychgates were built as war memorials, for example that of Sandridge, Hertfordshire. Sandridge lychgate is a Grade II listed building as is that of St Cuthbert's, Allendale, Northumberland. However, many of these memorial lychgates, such as that of St Peter's, Felkirk, Yorkshire, are not listed. Several new examples were built to mark the new millennium, such as that at Lenton, Lincolnshire.

== Use ==
In the Middle Ages, before mortuaries, and at a time when most people died at home, the dead were placed on a bier and taken to the lychgate where they remained, often attended against bodysnatchers, until the funeral service, which may have been a day or two later. The lychgate kept the rain off, and often had seats for the vigil watchers. Bodies at that time were buried in just shrouds rather than coffins. At the funeral, the priest conducted the first part of the service under the shelter of the lychgate.

In traditional usage, the gate was "the sheltered point at which the coffin was set down at a funeral to await the clergyman's arrival." An English commentator, writing in 1899, noted that the lych-gate, "or corpse-gate, with its pent-house roof, is specially provided for the shelter of a funeral while awaiting the priest, but it is only in a few cases that it is exclusively used for that purpose; it is frequently, perhaps, where it exists, commonly, the principal gateway of the churchyard." In some regions of Cornwall and Devon, such gates were called "trim-trams" – the spot where a funeral train (or tram) was brought into the proper order (or trimmed) to be ready for the officiating clergyman. In parts of Scotland, Lykerstanes (lit. "corpse stones") may have served a similar purpose.

Lychgates serve to differentiate consecrated and unconsecrated space, and serve as a liminal space. Stone lychgates may create an increased aural awareness of the transition from one space to another by creating a tangible contrast between sounds inside and outside. In England, there was a folk belief that the spirit of the last person buried stands watch at the gate until the next is buried, leading to funeral fights at the entrance to decide which corpse should be buried first.

=== Wedding traditions ===
Traditionally in some parts of England, particularly parts of Yorkshire, at the end of the wedding as the bride and groom leave the church the gates are closed (or where there is an absence of gates a rope is held across) by the local children and the couple have to pay them to let them pass. Conversely, in Cheshire and Shropshire, wedding parties would never pass through the lychgate, so as to avoid misfortune.

== Examples ==
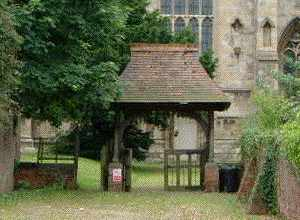
A traditional English lychgate at Patrington, East Yorkshire

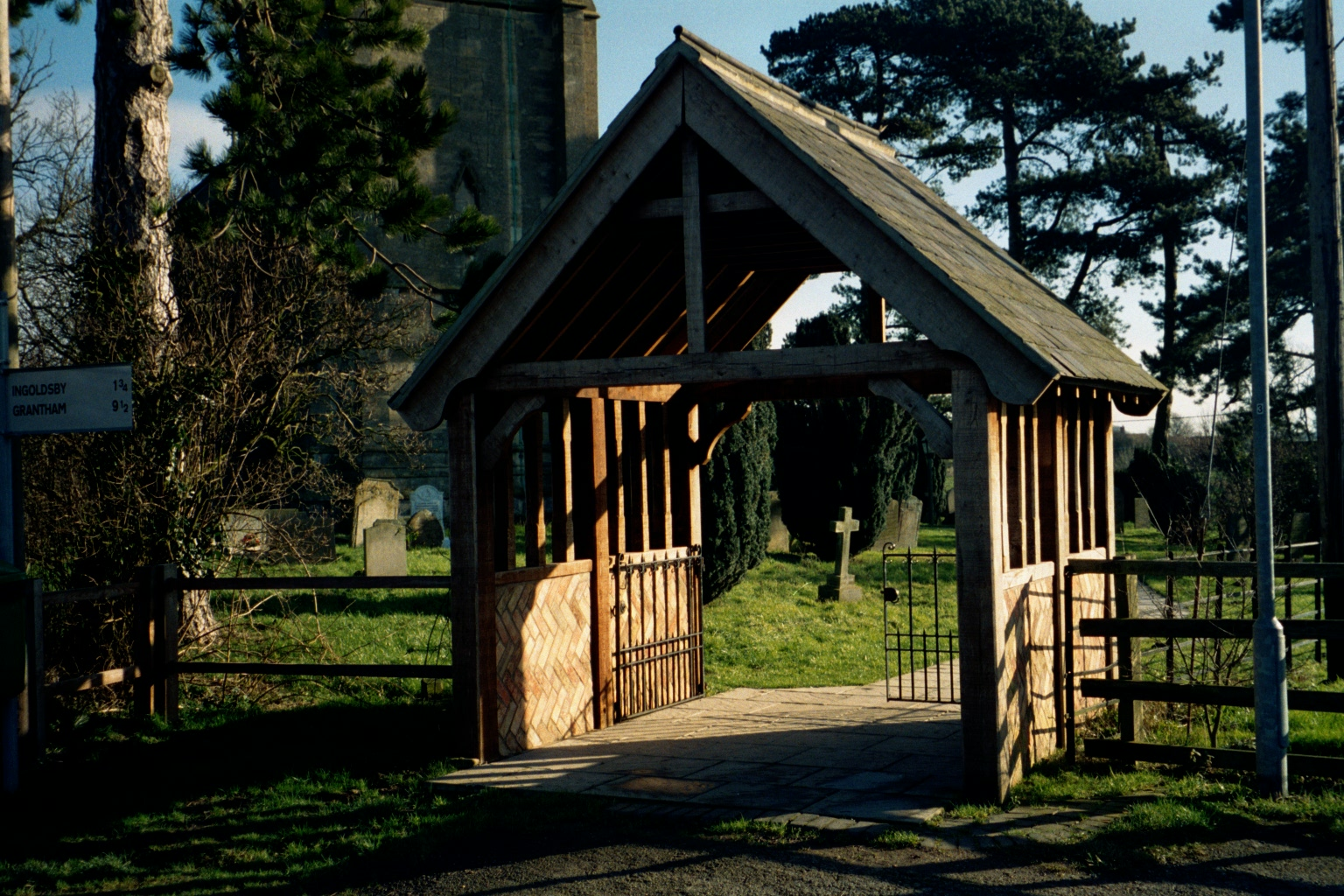
Millennium lychgate at Lenton, Lincolnshire

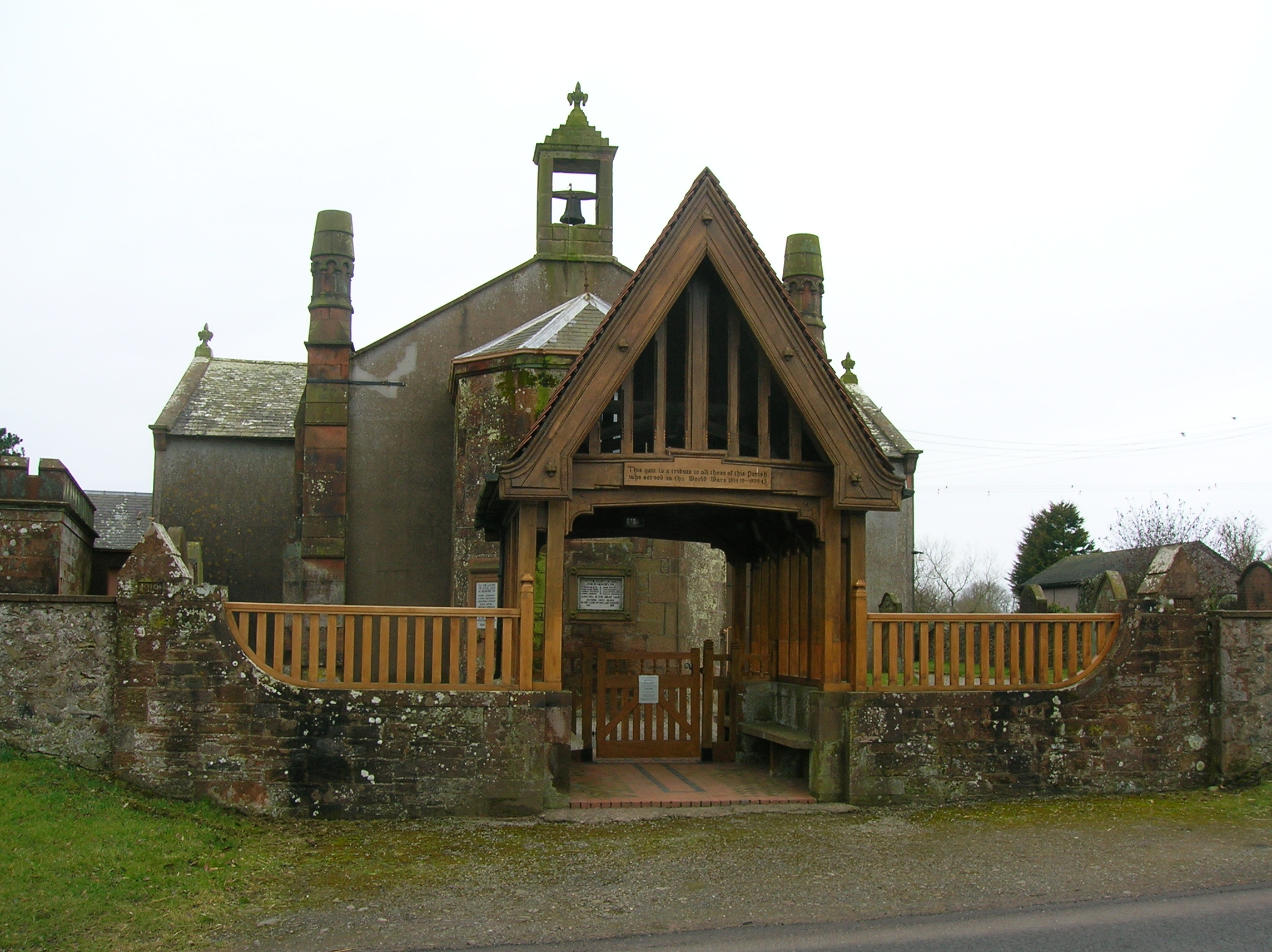
A rare Scottish example at Cummertrees, Dumfries and Galloway

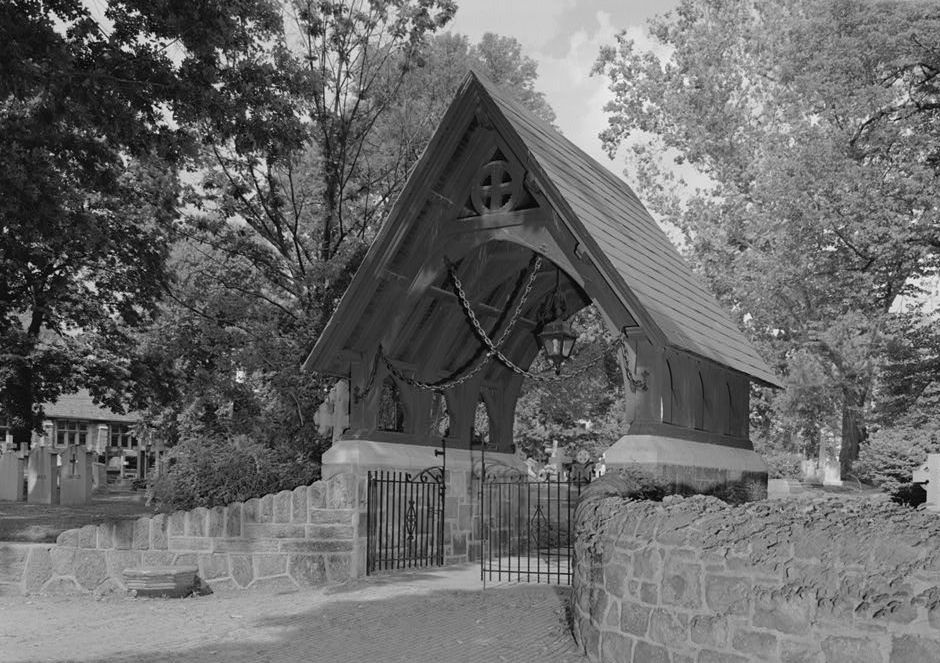
Lychgate at the Church of St. James the Less, Philadelphia

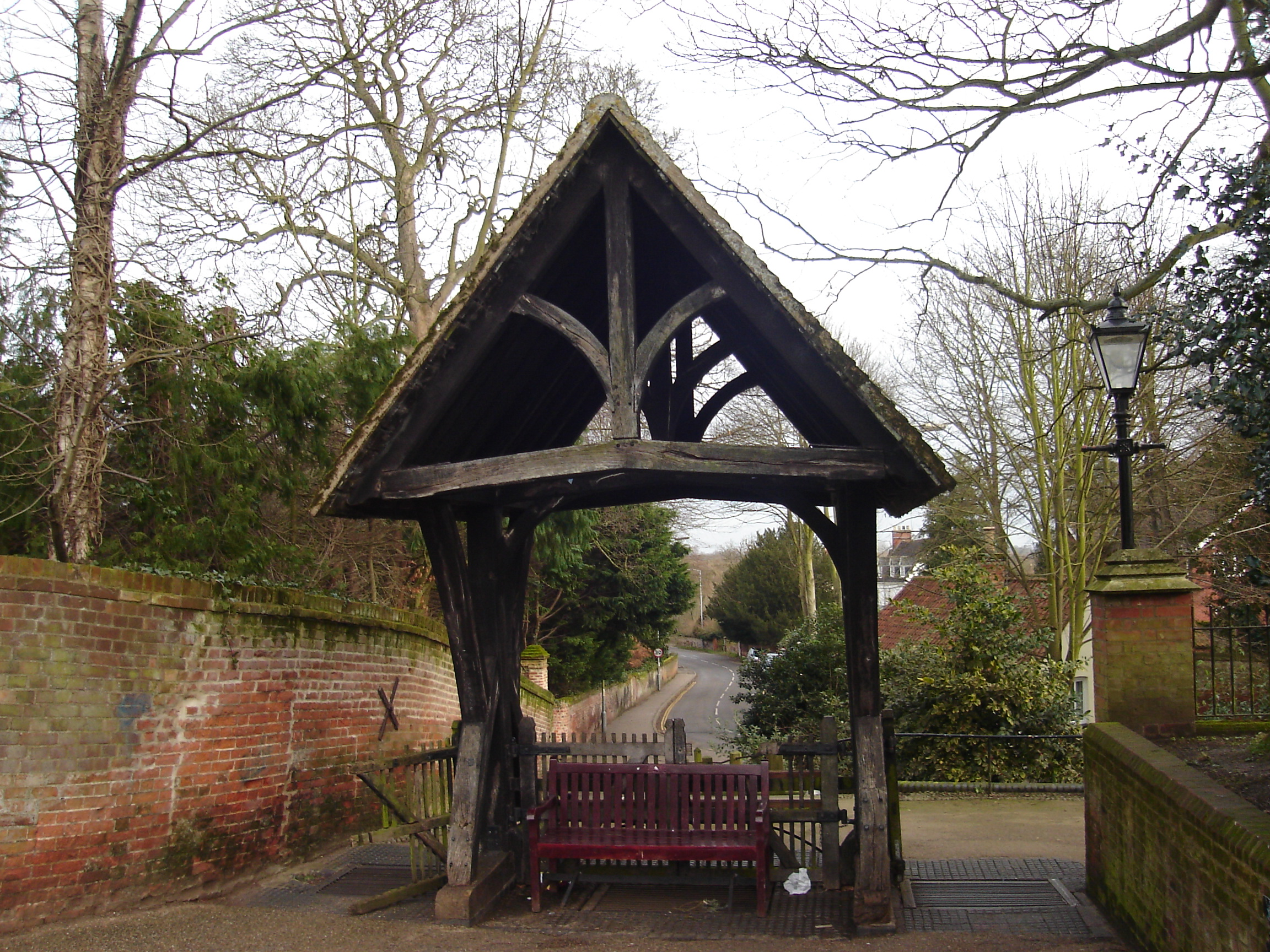
Lychgate at St. Michael's church, Aylsham, Norfolk

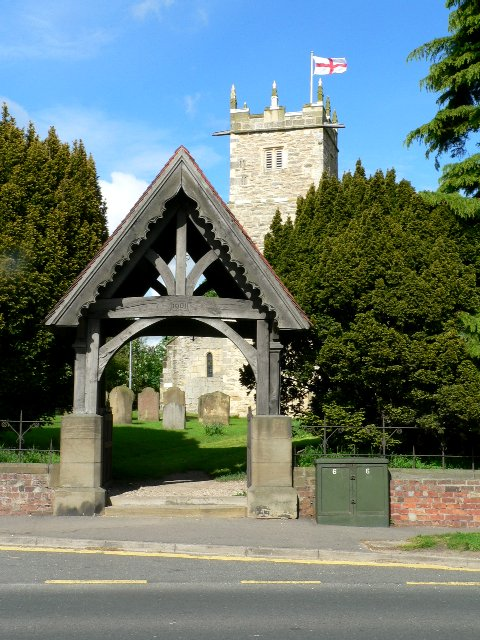
Lychgate of All Saints Parish Church, Shiptonthorpe, East Yorkshire

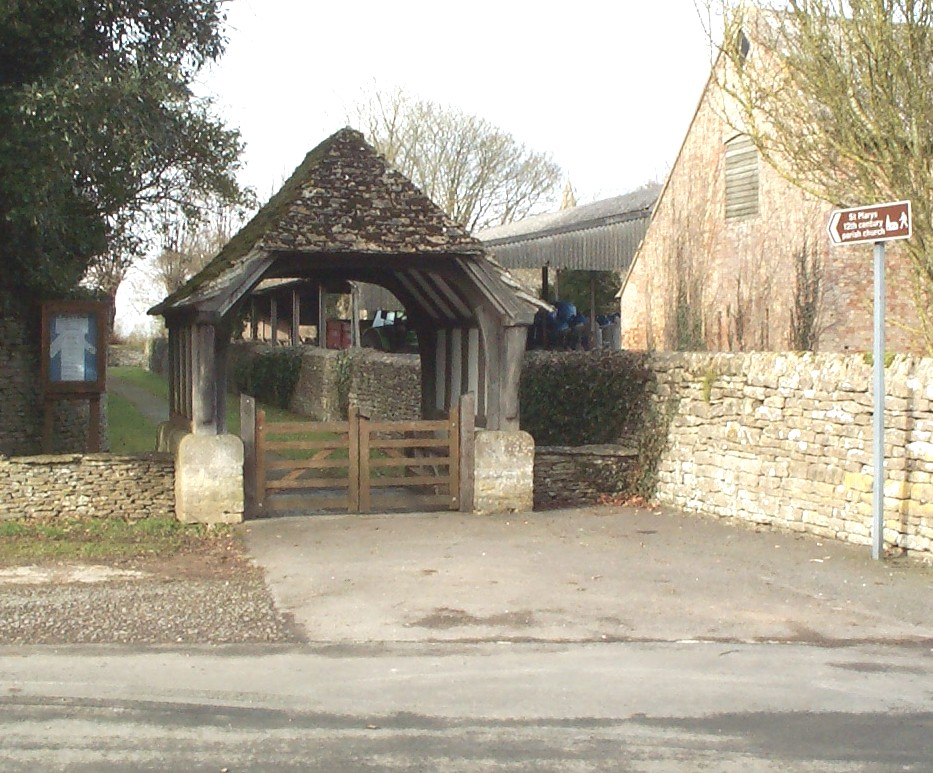
Lychgate at St.Mary's parish church, Castle Eaton, Wiltshire

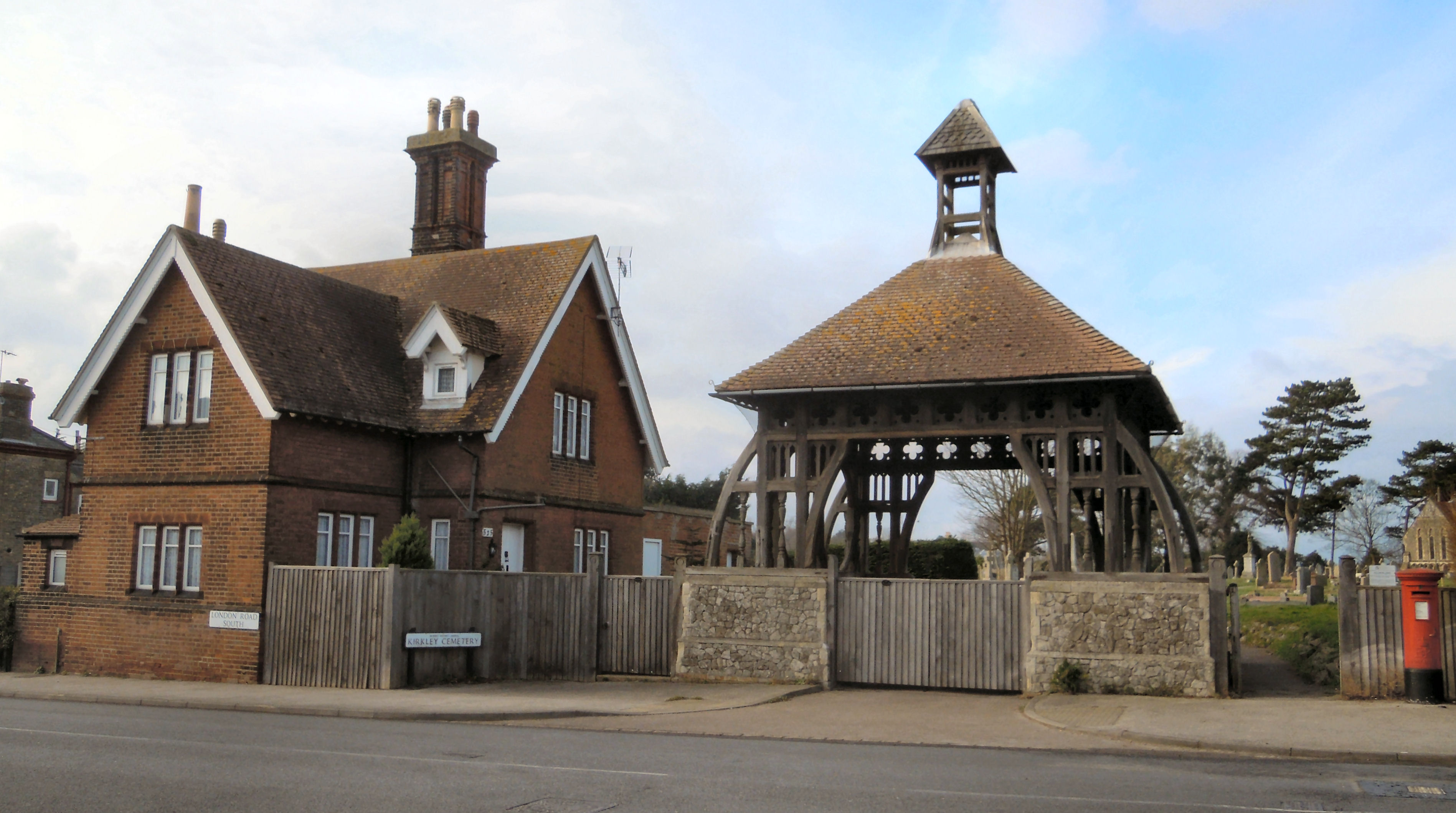
Lychgate at Kirkley Cemetery, Lowestoft, Suffolk

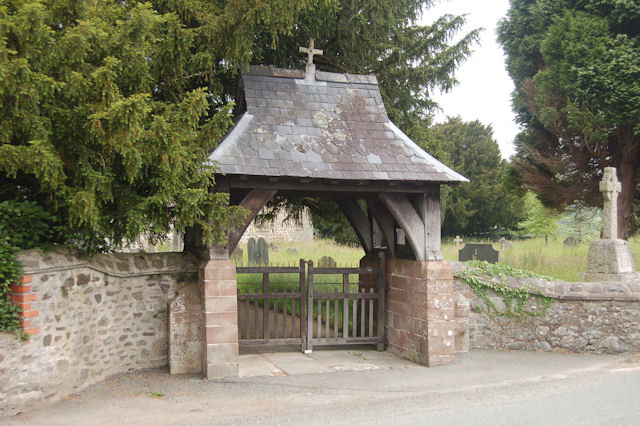
Lychgate designed by John Douglas at St Michael's Church, Manafon, Powys

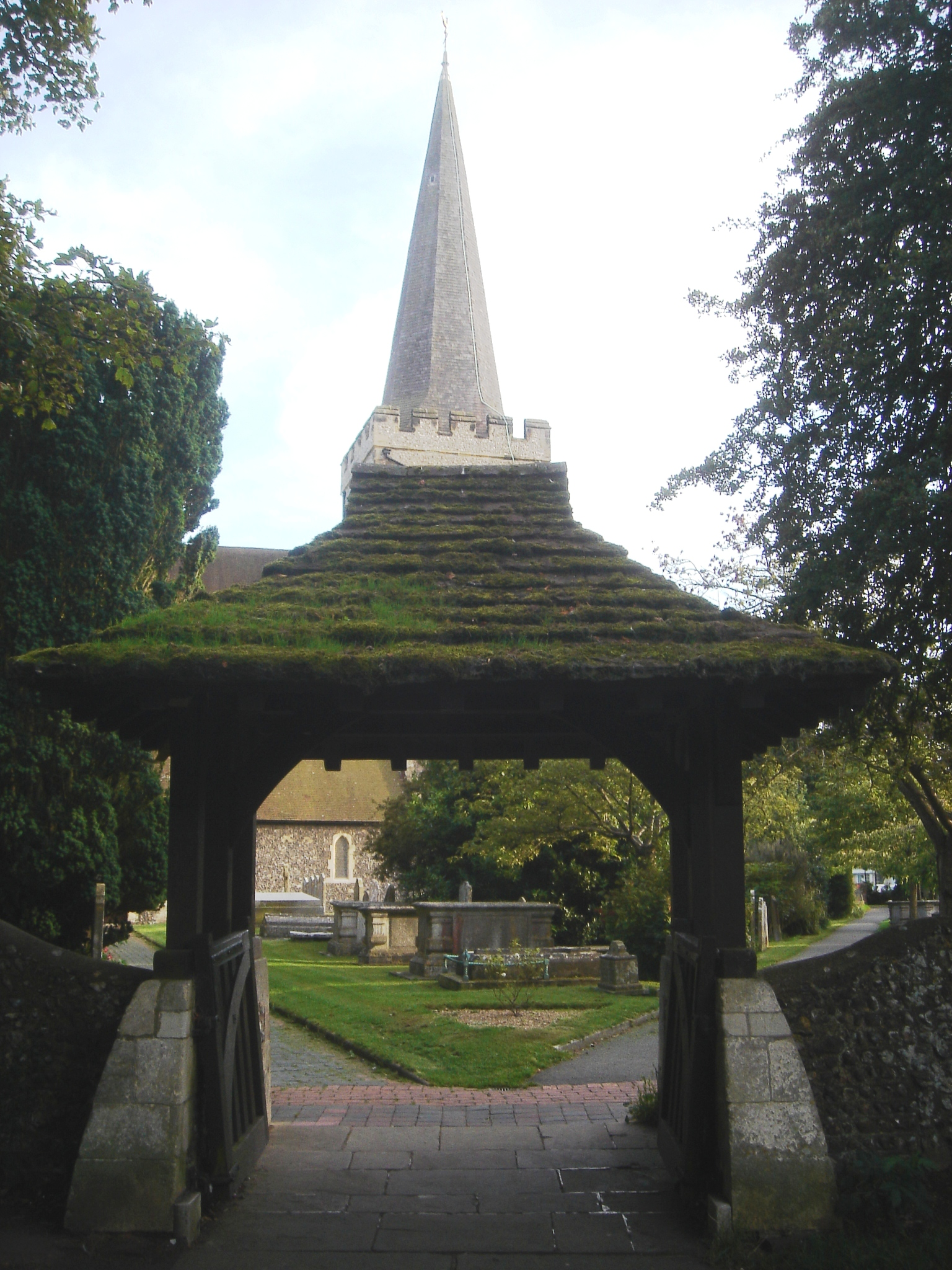
Early 20th-century lychgate at St Andrew's Church, West Tarring, West Sussex

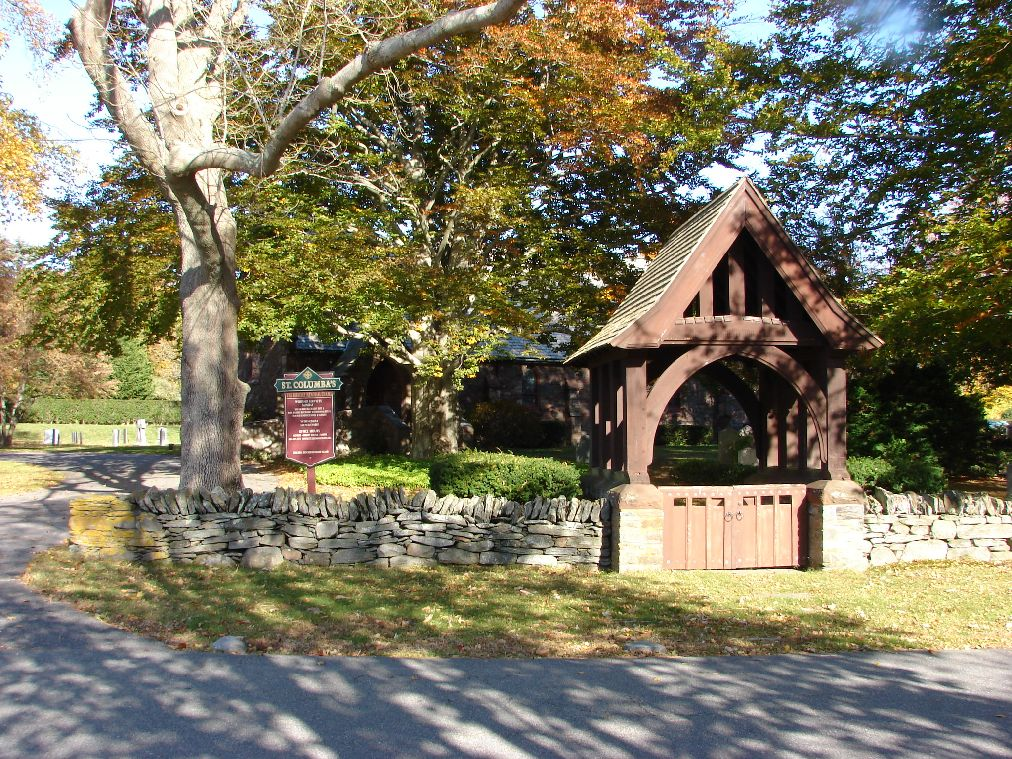
Lychgate at St. Columba's Chapel (Middletown, Rhode Island)

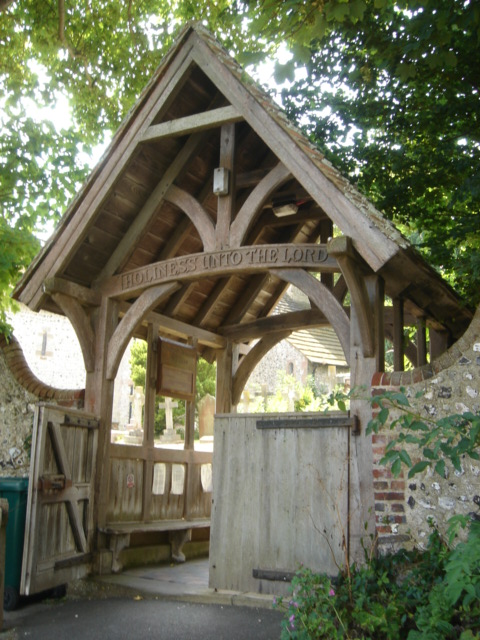
Lychgate at St Wulfran's Church, Ovingdean, East Sussex

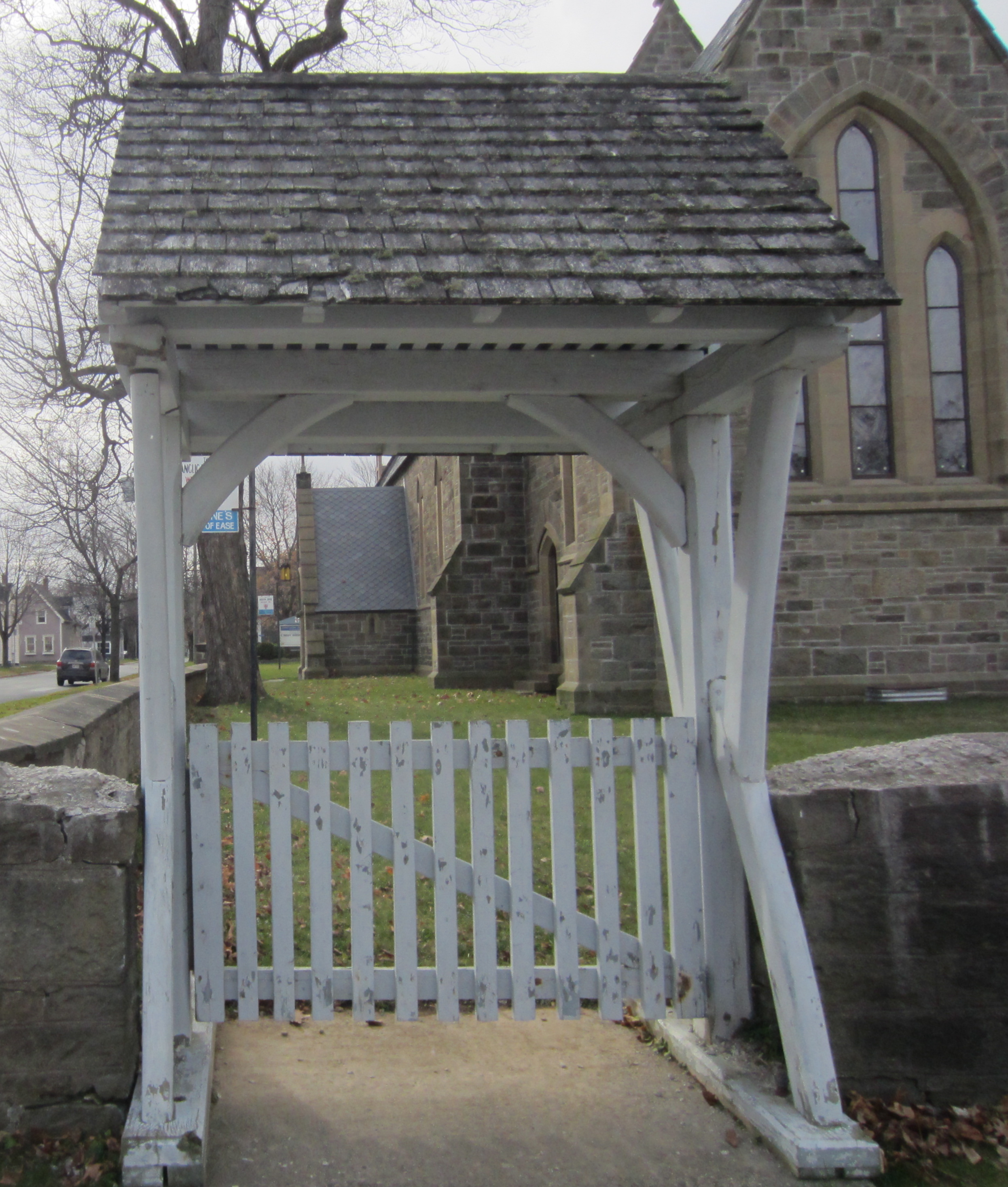
Lychgate at St. Anne's Chapel (Fredericton), New Brunswick

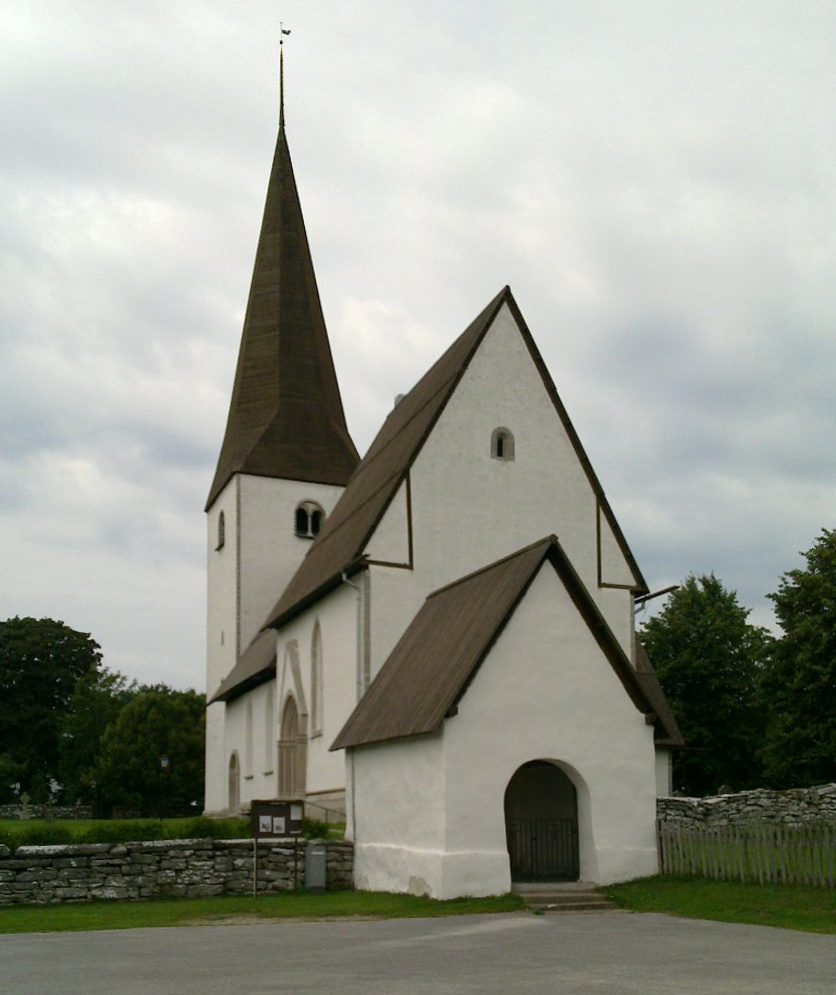
Lychgate at Alskog Church, Gotland (Sweden)

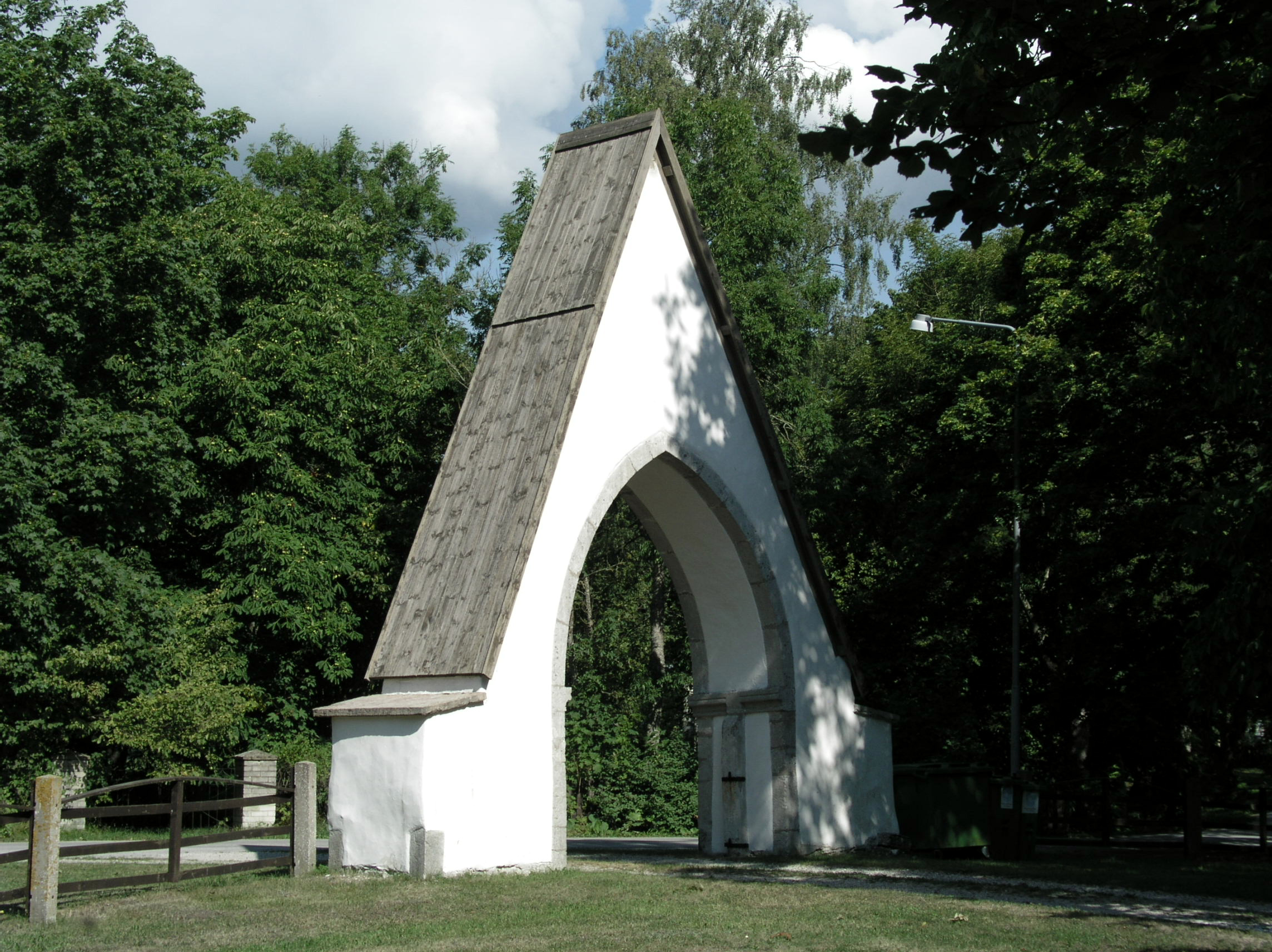
Lychgate at Garde Church, Gotland

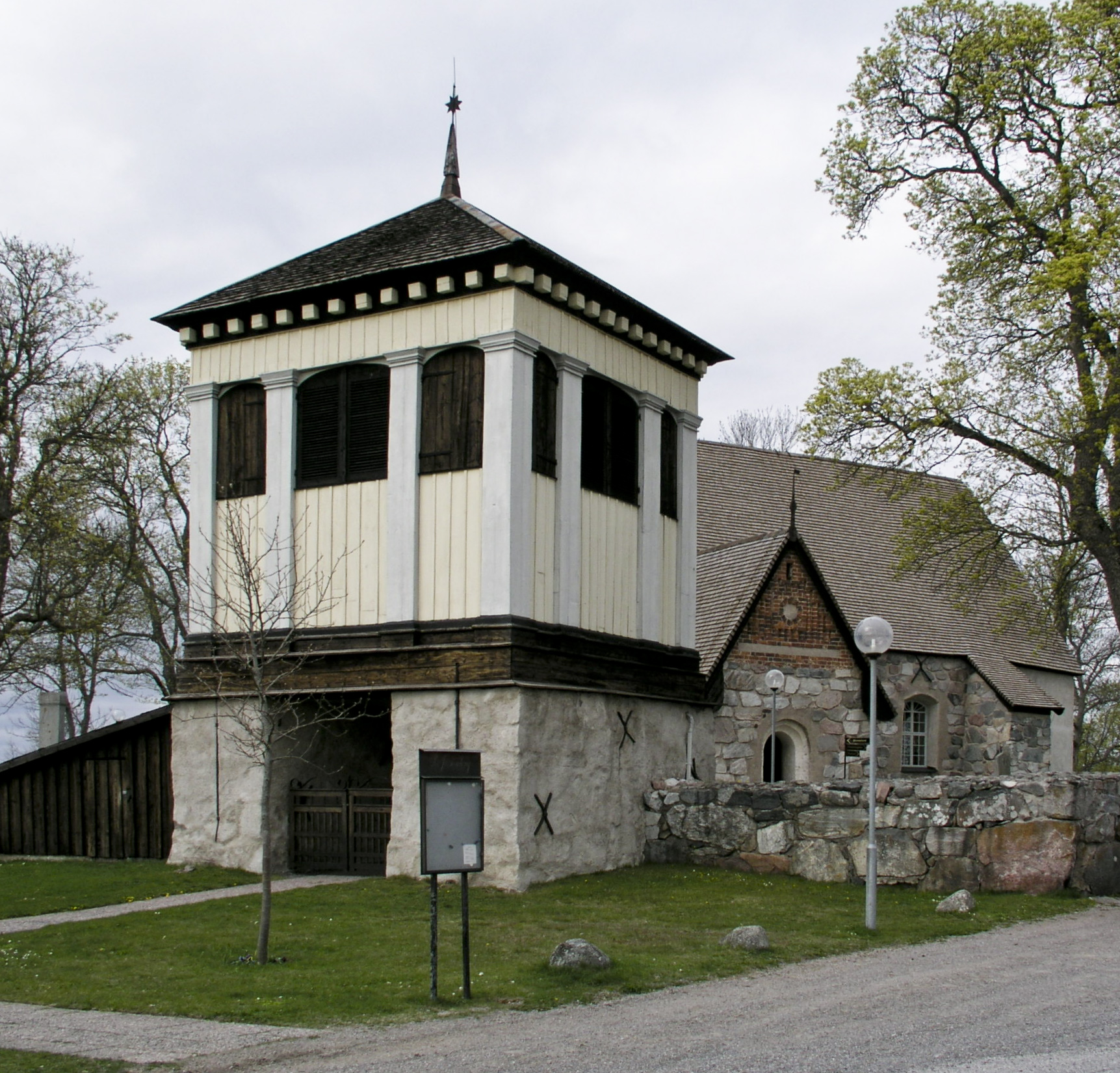
Combined lychgate and bell tower at Rö Church, Sweden

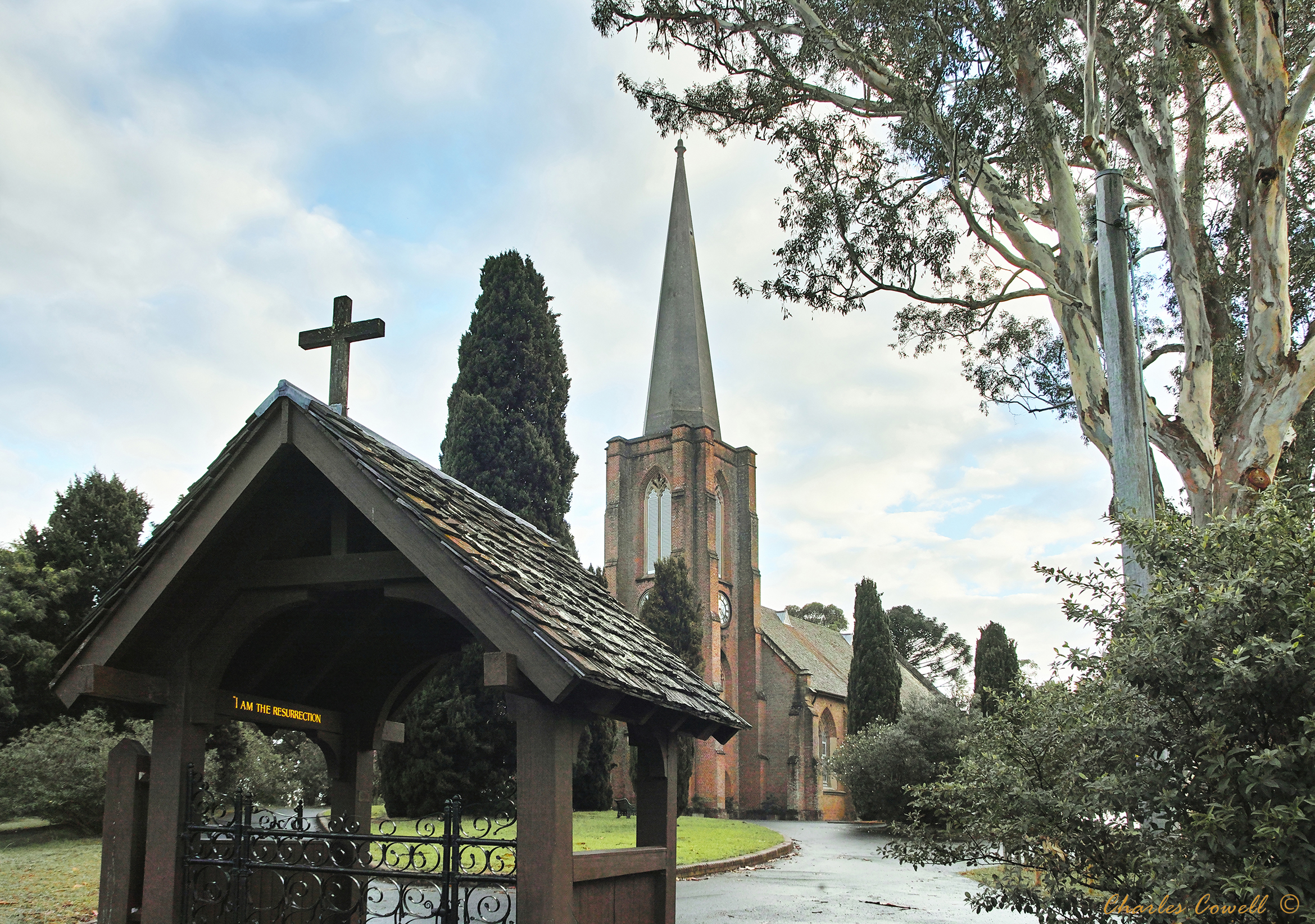
The Anglican Church of St John the Evangelist & its lychgate, Camden, NSW 27 Feb 2017

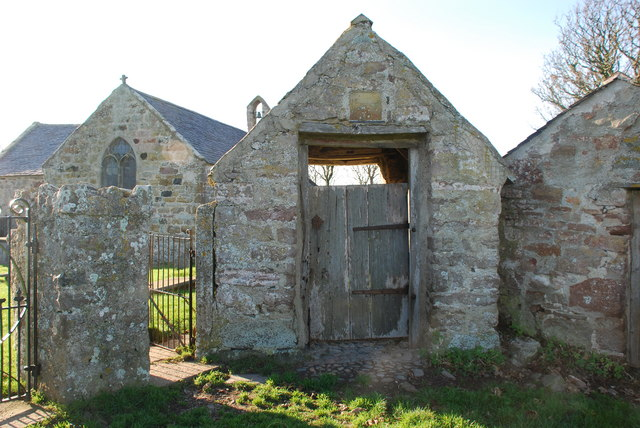
St Baglan's Church, Llanfaglan, Wales

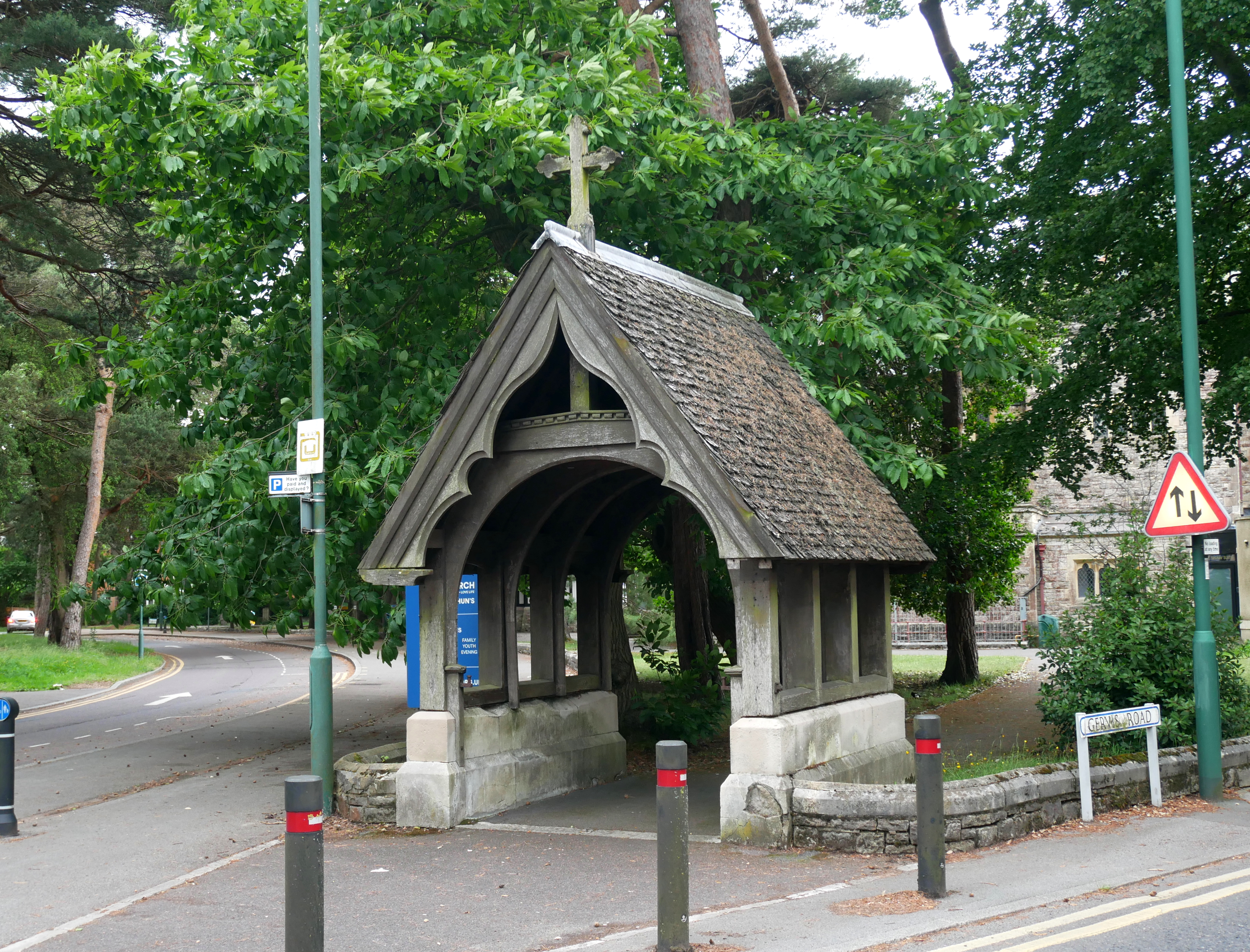
Lychgate of the St Swithun's Church, Bournemouth

== See also ==
- Corpse road
- Church porch
- Lich
- Lyke-Wake Dirge
