= Coffin rest =

Fixed support for a coffin before burial

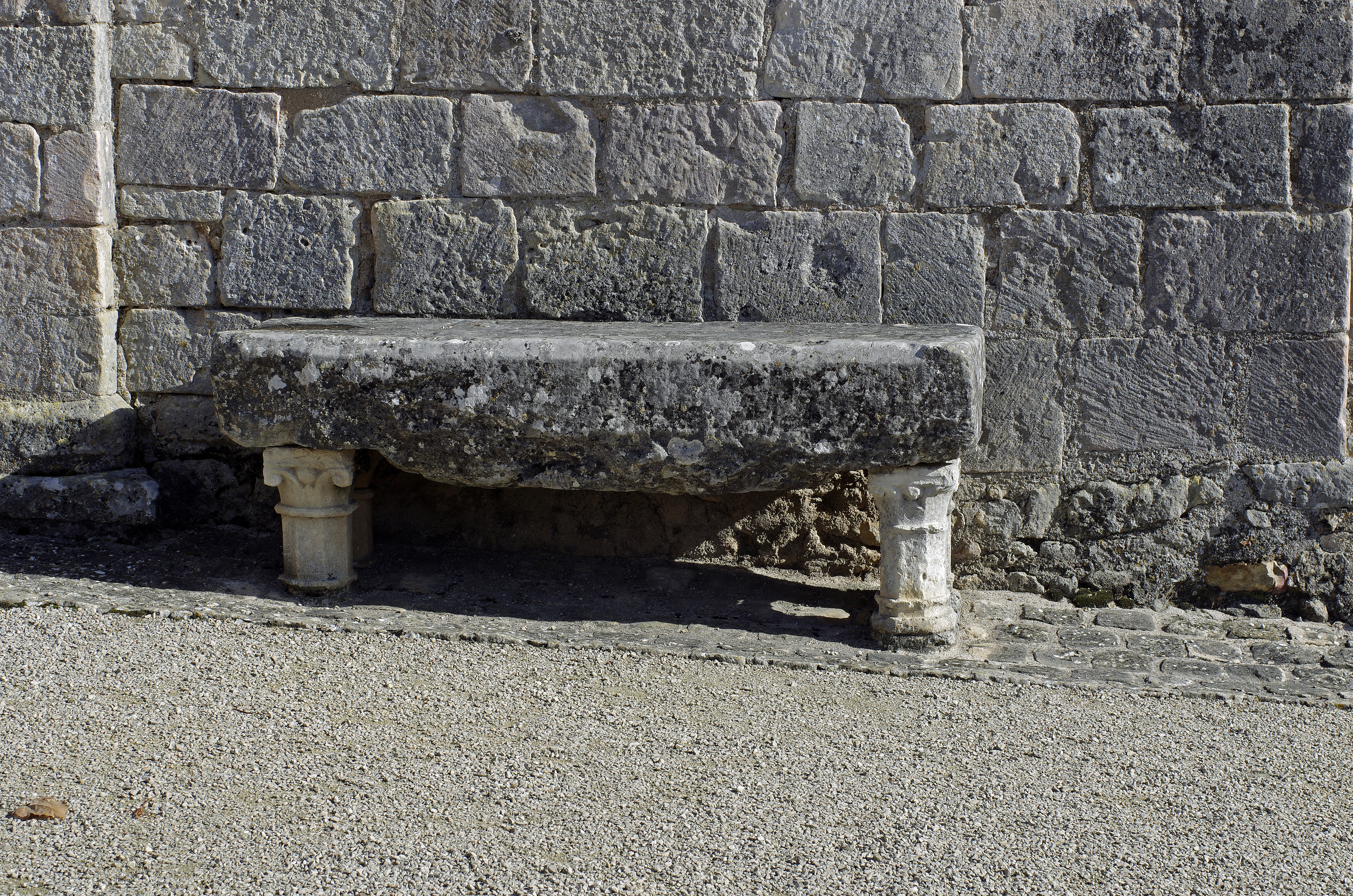
A pierre des morts (coffin rest) at Antigny, France

A coffin rest is a fixed structure on which a coffin is placed temporarily before burial, often in a churchyard or lychgate. A stone coffin rest at a churchyard entrance is also known as a lychstone or lych-stone. A coffin stone is a type of coffin rest beside a route to a churchyard, used to support the coffin during the stop along its journey.

== France ==
In France, these structures are known as pierres des morts ('stones of the dead') or pierres d'attente des morts ('waiting stones for the dead'). They supported coffins during pauses on the journey from the deceased's home to the church. In his 1915 survey, Marcel Baudouin reported examples particularly in western and central France, including Berry, Poitou and Touraine.

=== Form and use ===
The rests included stone blocks and masonry structures. Bearers could set down the coffin on them while they rested. Some took the form of a slab raised on two or four supports. Many were plain, while others bore a carved cross or an inscription.

Stones near church doors supported the coffin while the priest blessed it before it was carried inside. When a funeral came from an outlying hamlet, the priest could meet the procession at a stone at the entrance to the village. In the discussion following Baudouin's paper, Léonce Manouvrier described stones in Marche and Limousin as meeting places where mourners waited for the coffin and the priest received it.

=== Decline and preservation ===
Jacques Gélis and Jean-Jacques Immel describe a decline in the use of the stones during the nineteenth and twentieth centuries, with differences between communities. The introduction of hearses allowed priests to receive coffins directly from the vehicle. Some stones were later used as benches; others were broken up for road fill.

Examples protected as monuments historiques include:

- Luant, in Indre, where a sixteenth-century gravestone was reused as a coffin rest. It was registered as a historic object, together with a cross and its base, on 12 March 1986.
- Choussy, in Loir-et-Cher, whose coffin-shaped stone was registered on 25 July 1973.
- Lassay-sur-Croisne, also in Loir-et-Cher, whose stone was registered on 16 April 1973.

== Britain ==
=== Roadside rests ===
A slab beside the bridge at Ivelet, in Swaledale, England, is commonly described to have supported a wicker basket with a body. According to the traditional sources, bodies were carried from upper Swaledale to Grinton for burial prior to construction of the church at Muker in 1580. At Baschurch, Shropshire, a rest dated by Historic England to about the nineteenth century stands beside a stile on the footpath from Walford to All Saints' Church. It consists of a rectangular stone base topped by two slabs.

In the Scottish Highlands, coffin rests and resting cairns marked the stops on routes to parish burial grounds. These "corpse roads" are known mostly through oral tradition and surviving remains. A coffin rest at Clayside, near Golspie in Sutherland, was built into a roadside wall, with upright sandstone slabs supporting a horizontal one for coffinscarried between Brora and Golspie.

=== Churchyard rests and lychgates ===
Some lychgates contained a slab or rest for the coffin, with benches for the funeral party. They provided shelter while the party waited for the priest at the churchyard entrance. At Cubert, Cornwall, a stone stand at the churchyard entrance received coffins brought from outlying hamlets. The vicar sprinkled the coffin with holy water before it was carried into the church.

In Wales, Aymer Vallance's 1920 study described the remains of a lychstone, or coffin rest, at Caerwys, Flintshire. It had taken the form of a low wall about the length of a coffin, beneath a wooden cross in the centre of the lychgate.

Later examples include the stone coffin rest and lychgate designed by W. D. Caroe at Brampton Abbotts, Herefordshire, in 1931. The rest has a raised, carved back and the date cut into its base. Historic England's listing records it at the southern side of the churchyard, separate from the lychgate at the eastern entrance.
