= Ivelet =

Hamlet in North Yorkshire, England

Coordinates: 54.37762°N 2.10025°W

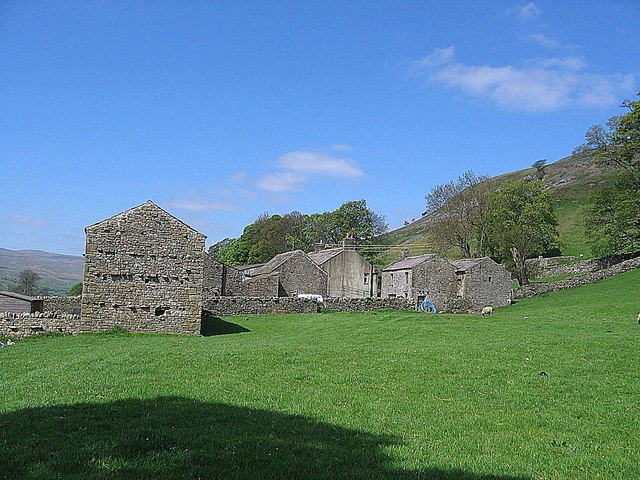

- Location within North Yorkshire
- OS grid reference: SD935980
- Civil parish: Muker
- Unitary authority: North Yorkshire
- Ceremonial county: North Yorkshire
- Region: Yorkshire and the Humber
- Country: England
- Sovereign state: United Kingdom
- Post town: RICHMOND
- Postcode district: DL11
- Police: North Yorkshire
- Fire: North Yorkshire
- Ambulance: Yorkshire
- UK Parliament: Richmond and Northallerton

Ivelet is a hamlet in the civil parish of Muker, in the Yorkshire Dales, North Yorkshire, England, about a mile west of Gunnerside in Swaledale.

== Toponymy ==
The Survey of English Place-Names claims Ivelet derives from "Ifa's slope", similar to Ivinghoe. However, it is also speculated the name may derive from "idhe" and "læghe" in Old Swedish, meaning "timber from yew" and "camp" respectively.

== Ivelet Bridge ==
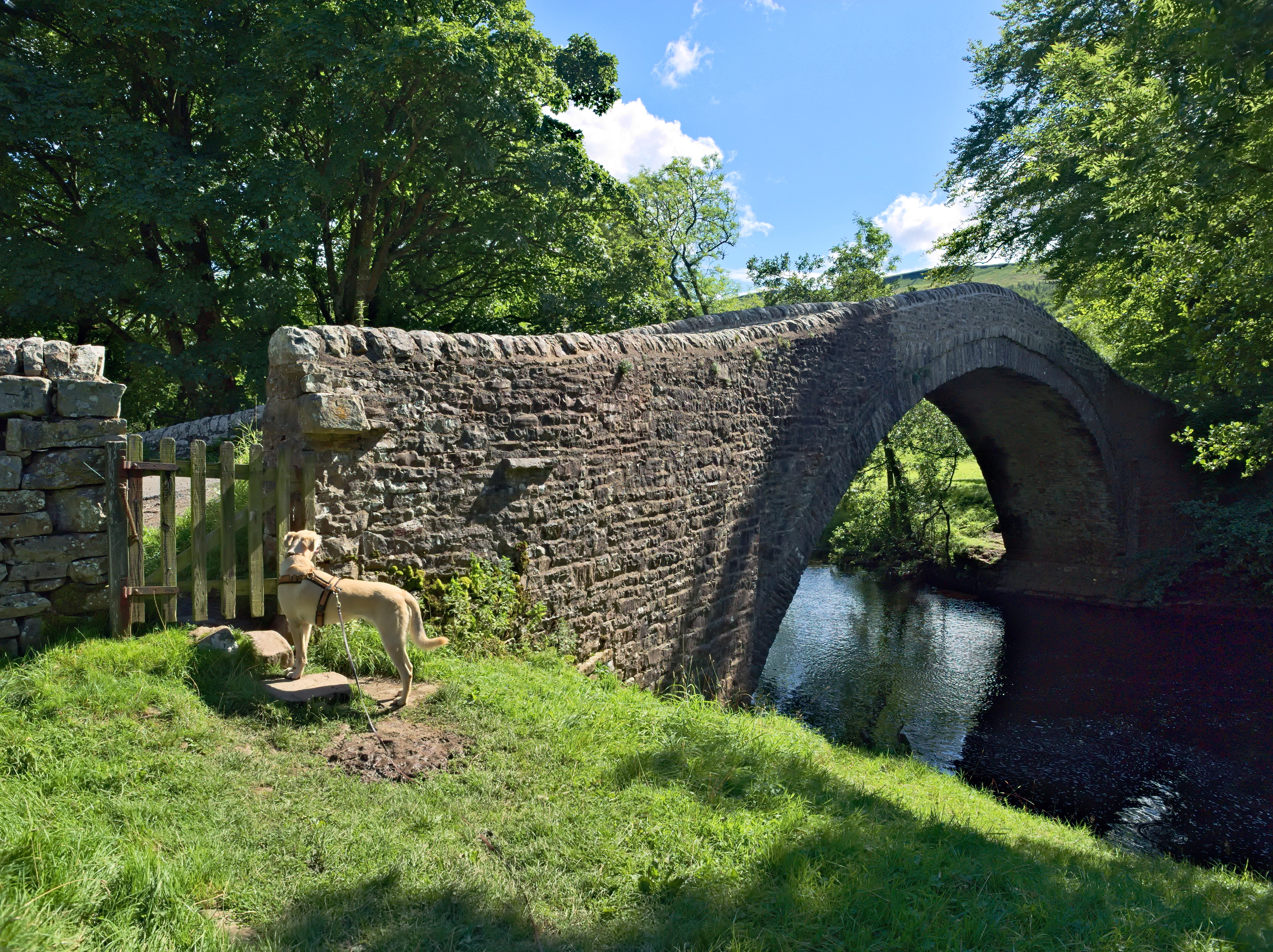
Ivelet Bridge, an ancient bridge over the River Swale, built originally for packhorses, but now used by the occasional vehicle

Ivelet Bridge crosses the River Swale near Ivelet. Dating from the late 16th century, the bridge has been designated a Grade II* listed structure.

A coffin stone is set into the verge on the north side of the bridge for pall bearers to rest with a coffin on their way from Muker to the church at Grinton. The coffin stone is itself a Grade II structure.

The bridge is featured in the British television series All Creatures Great and Small, in the episode "Call of the Wild".

== See also ==
- Listed buildings in Muker
