= Croft Circuit =

Motor racing circuit in North Yorkshire, England

- Main Circuit (1997–present)
- Location: North Yorkshire, England
- Coordinates: 54°27′21″N 1°33′46″W
- FIA Grade: 3 (Note: Croft Circuit's Grade 3 licence expired 21 June 2025.)
- Owner: British Automobile Racing Club (2006–present)
- Opened: 3 August 1964; 62 years ago Re-opened: 14 May 1995; 31 years ago
- Closed: 1981
- Major events: Current: BTCC (1997–present); TCR UK (2018–2019, 2023–present); Former: BSB (2004–2011); British F3 (1997–2005, 2007–2008); British GT (1997–2002, 2005, 2007); FIA European Rallycross Championship (1994); Interserie (1970)

Main Circuit (1997–present)
- Length: 3.423 km (2.127 mi)
- Turns: 16
- Race lap record: 1:13.656 ( (Mexico) Sergio Pérez, Dallara F308, 2008, F3)

Club Circuit 'A' (1997–present)
- Length: 1.997 km (1.241 mi)
- Turns: 8

Autodrome (1995–1996)
- Length: 2.897 km (1.800 mi)
- Turns: 13

Autodrome (1964–1981)
- Length: 2.816 km (1.750 mi)
- Turns: 12
- Race lap record: 1:04.800 ( (United Kingdom) Chris Craft, McLaren M8C, 1970, Group 7)

Croft Circuit is a motor racing circuit located near Dalton-on-Tees in North Yorkshire, England. The tarmac circuit is 2.127 mi (3.423 km) long and is based on the lands of an airfield, but has long since moved on from being a basic airfield circuit. The circuit holds meetings of the British Touring Car Championship, British Rallycross and Pickup Truck Racing race series.

== History ==
The first records of racing at Croft date back to the 1920s, but it was after the Second World War that Croft circuit became a significant motorsport venue.

At the beginning of the Second World War an airfield named RAF Croft was built on the site now occupied by the circuit. RAF Croft also known as Croft Aerodrome, was mainly used as a bomber airfield. It was home to a number of different aircraft types including Wellington, Lancaster, Whitley, Stirling and Halifax bombers.

There were a number of notorious accidents mainly involving returning bombers missing their runway. One bomber made it all the way back from Germany only to crash into a tree at Atley Hill, about 4-mile (6.4 km) away; all the crew were killed. The dead stump of the tree survived as a grim memorial on Atley Hill until it was grubbed out by the landowner in the mid 1990s.

Croft Aerodrome was home to a number of squadrons including 419 Squadron from Canada. The platforms at the nearby Eryholme railway station were often crowded with airmen and ground crew during the war years. The verges along the public access road to Croft Aerodrome were used to store racks of bombs and other military equipment, a fascinating attraction to local children at the time.

At the end of hostilities the aerodrome was abandoned by the RAF, it is still possible to see some military era buildings and structures surviving on nearby farmland, though most of the major structures such as hangars have been demolished and used as hardcore in the nearby villages of North Cowton, Dalton-on-Tees and Croft-on-Tees.

In 1947 businessman and councillor John Neasham acquired the lease to the land and formed Darlington and District Aero Club. However, the club folded after only 5 years and the airfield fell into disuse.

During the late 1940s and into the 1950s, Darlington & District Motor Club held Motor Race Meetings on various layouts utilising the runways and perimeter roads and then in 1962 Bruce Ropner and fellow enthusiasts bought half the venue at public auction, completing a track on the site in July 1964. The first meeting in August 1964, attracted a crowd of between 30,000 and 50,000 people.

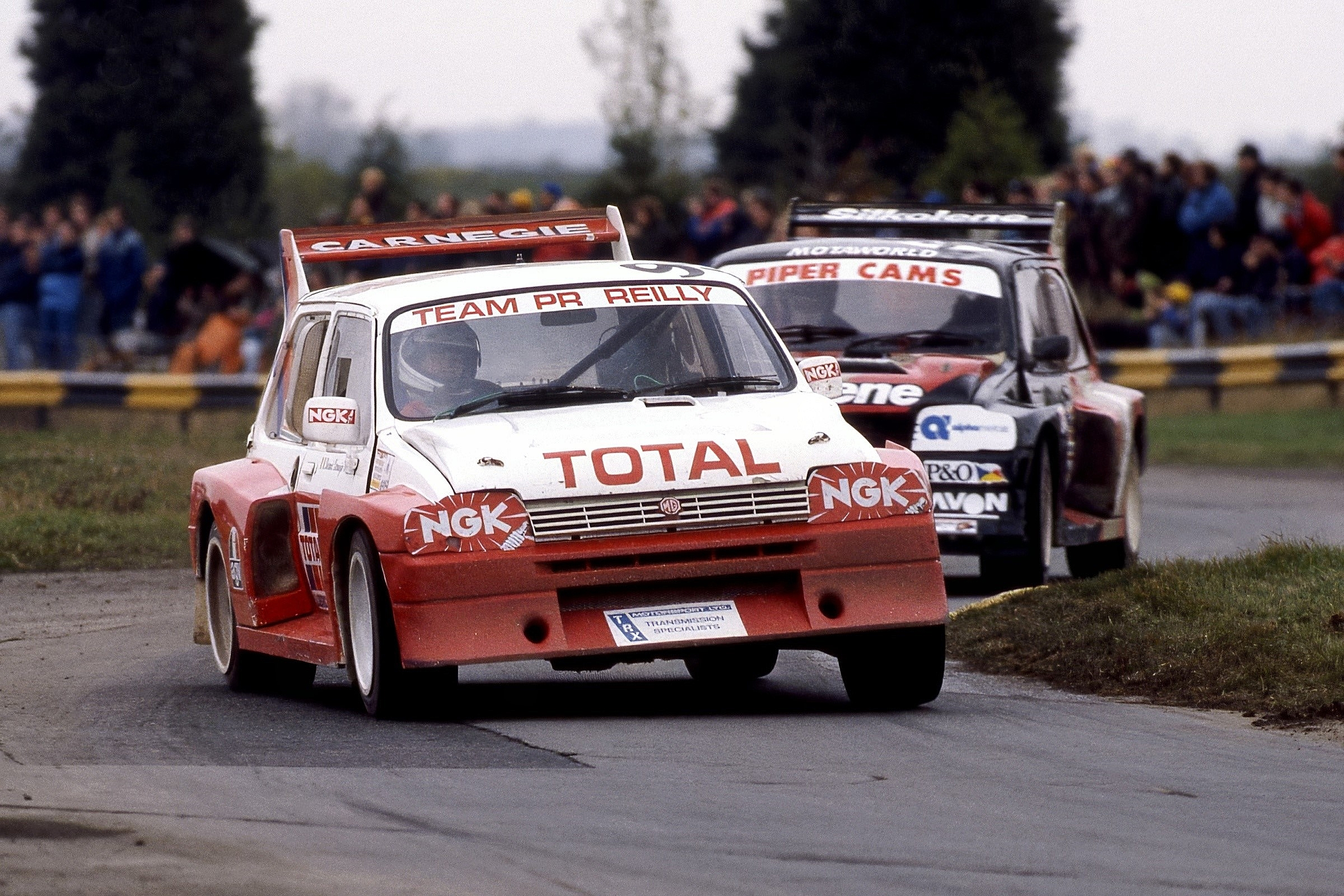
Irishman Dermot Carnegie (MG Metro 6R4) leading Englishman Will Gollop (MG Metro 6R4 BiTurbo) during the 1990 FIA Internations-Cup Rallycross at Croft Circuit

Over the years the circuit has played host to many famous names and has hosted national and international meetings. However, slowly attention focussed on circuits in the south of England such as Brands Hatch, Silverstone and Lydden and in December 1967 Croft began hosting Rallycross. The events were utilised by ITV's World Of Sport and were televised live. Whilst Rallycross was considered to be a winter sport, circuit racing continued. By 1981 the profitability had fallen and with the circuit requiring a total resurfacing, it closed to circuit racing. Local farmer, George Shield, agreed a lease to run Rallycross and, in conjunction with Darlington & District Motor Club, successfully developed the track for this sport. Croft held the FIA Internations-Cup events of 1987 and 1990 as well as the 1994 British round of the FIA European Rallycross Championship.

With the attention brought by Rallycross the decision was taken to reintroduce tarmac racing and became a popular host of motorcycle and car racing.

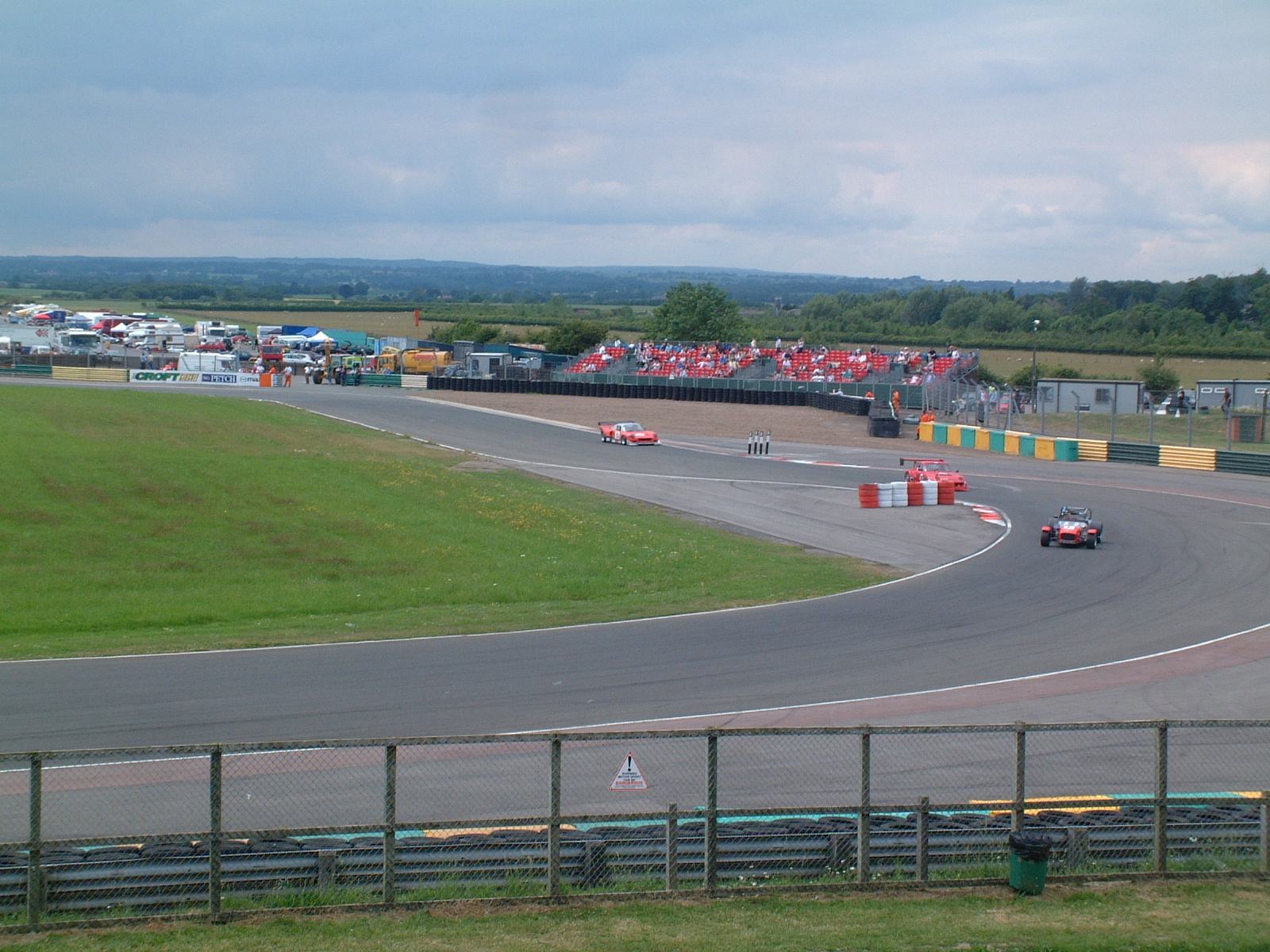
Corners 1 & 2

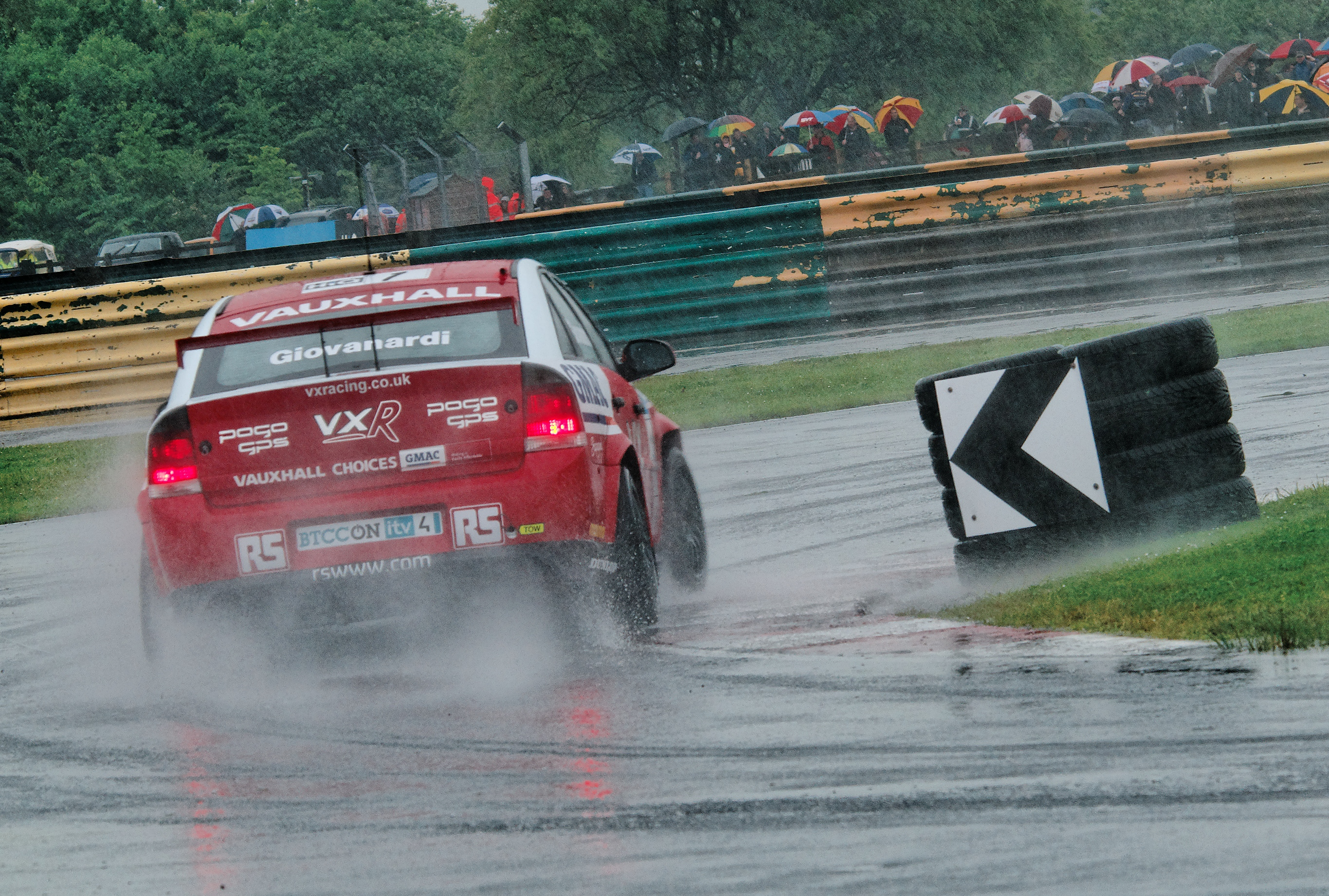
Fabrizio Giovanardi at the complex

In 1997 the circuit underwent a major transformation – the circuit was extended to 2.127 mi (3.423 km) and new pits, paddock complex, control tower and spectator areas were constructed.

British Touring Cars and British Superbikes soon came to the circuit. British Superbikes remained a regular feature until 2011, while British Touring Cars remain a regular feature on the calendar.

A regular Monster Energy British Rallycross Championship fixture continues the long history of Rallycross at Croft. The MSA British RallyCross Grand Prix featured at Croft in 2013.

== Noise related legal action ==
In 2000, an official complaint was upheld by local residents over the noise produced by the racing car engines. This was claimed to be having an effect on some people's health, although Darlington Borough Council later quashed this, Croft Circuit gives a number of free tickets to local residents as compensation for the noise.

The circuit lost a court case in April 2008 and the claimants were awarded a total of £149,600 in compensation for the noise suffered but their request for an injunction against the existing operation of the circuit was refused. Both parties appealed this judgement. The appeal was heard on 15 January 2009 with the decision being made on 26 January 2009. The claimant's appeal was upheld; the injunction was granted and was the only substantive impact of the case. "Noisy days" were limited to 40 days. This had been the primary objective of the claimants and the outcome of the lawsuit was that the 40-day injunction was granted instead of monetary damages. The damage payments were therefore reduced to a nominal level, though the circuit was still liable for legal costs. The primary reasoning behind this outcome was that the circuit could make no reasonable case that its economic survival would be affected by this injunction. The circuit continues to operate its major race days which account for the vast majority of its revenue. (Feb 2009)

A copy of the appeal judgement can be found at http://www.bailii.org/ew/cases/EWCA/Civ/2009/15.html. (Feb 2009)

== Major races ==
Croft has been staging major races since 1996. They are the British Touring Car Championship (BTCC), along with support series Porsche Carrera Cup Great Britain, Renault Clio Cup, Historic Car Racing, and Ginetta Junior Championship: and formerly hosted the UK Formula Renault, Formula BMW UK, SEAT Leon Cupra Championship.

The British Superbike Championship left the calendar following the 2011 season and is not yet scheduled to return to Croft.

Croft last featured on the F3/GT calendar for the 2007 and the 2008 season.

=== Event list ===
Current

- June: TCR UK Touring Car Championship, Mini Festival
- August: British Touring Car Championship, Porsche Carrera Cup Great Britain, Battle of Britain

Former

- British Formula 3 International Series (1997–2005, 2007–2008)
- British GT Championship (1997–2002, 2005, 2007)
- British Superbike Championship (2004–2011)
- British Supersport Championship (2004–2011)
- F4 British Championship (2015–2023)
- Ferrari Challenge UK (2019)
- FIA European Rallycross Championship (1994)
- Formula BMW UK (2004–2007)
- Formula Palmer Audi (1998, 2002, 2007, 2010)
- Formula Renault 2.0 UK (1997–2011)
- Protyre Formula Renault Championship (1996–1997, 1999, 2001–2014)

== Lap records ==
As of September 2026, the fastest official race lap records at the Croft Circuit are listed as:

Category	Time	Driver	Vehicle	Event
Main Circuit (1997–present): 2.127 mi (3.423 km)
Formula Three	1:13.656	Sergio Pérez	Dallara F308	2008 Croft British F3 round
GT1	1:16.759	Tim Sugden	McLaren F1 GTR	1999 Croft British GT round
Formula Renault 2.0	1:17.451	Ollie Millroy	Barazi-Epsilon FR2.0-10	2010 Croft Formula Renault 2.0 UK round
Formula 4	1:17.465	Alex Dunne	Tatuus F4-T421	2022 Croft British F4 round
Formula Palmer Audi	1:18.481	Callum Holland	Formula Palmer Audi car	2010 Croft Formula Palmer Audi round
Superkart	1:18.601	Matt Robinson	Anderson Division 1 Superkart	2023 Croft Historic Race Weekend
Porsche Carrera Cup	1:18.629	Will Martin	Porsche 911 (992 I) GT3 Cup	2025 Croft Porsche Carrera Cup GB round
Superbike	1:19.695	Ryuichi Kiyonari	Honda CBR1000RR	2007 Croft BSB round
Formula Ford	1:19.754	Jayde Kruger	Mygale M12-SJ	2014 Croft British Formula Ford round
GT4	1:20.340	Joshua Rogers	Porsche 718 Cayman GT4 RS Clubsport	2026 Croft Porsche Sprint Challenge Great Britain round
NGTC	1:21.150	Tom Ingram	Hyundai i30 Fastback N Performance	2026 Croft BTCC round
Ferrari Challenge	1:21.493	Jamie Clarke	Ferrari 488 Challenge	2019 Croft Ferrari Challenge UK round
Super Touring	1:21.611	Rickard Rydell	Ford Mondeo Zetec	2000 Croft BTCC round
Formula BMW	1:21.810	James Sutton	Mygale FB02	2004 Croft Formula BMW UK round
Supersport	1:22.043	Alex Lowes	Yamaha YZF-R6	2010 Croft BSS round
TCR Touring Car	1:22.536	Sam Laidlaw	Cupra León VZ TCR	2025 Croft TCR UK round
BTC Touring	1:25.749	James Thompson	BTC-T Vauxhall Astra Coupe	2002 Croft BTCC round
Super 2000	1:26.297	Gordon Shedden	Honda Civic	2010 Croft BTCC round
SEAT León Supercopa	1:28.389	Jonathan Adam	SEAT León Supercopa Mk2	2007 Croft SEAT Cupra Championship round
Renault Clio Cup	1.30.200	Jack Young	Renault Clio R.S. IV	2019 Croft Renault UK Clio Cup round
Autodrome (1964–1981): 1.750 mi (2.816 km)
Group 7	1:04.800	Chris Craft	McLaren M8C	1970 RAC Croft Interserie round
Formula Three	1:07.400	Mike Wilds	March 733	1973 Croft British F3 round
Group 4	1:08.000	Trevor Taylor	Lola T70 Mk.IIIB GT	1969 Wills Trophy
Group 5 prototype	1:09.400	Jeremy Lord	Lola T212	1973 Croft MN GT round
Group 5 sports car	1:09.900	Peter Brown	Ferrari 512 M	1972 Croft MN GT round
Group 3	1:17.400	John Coundley (Note: Both drivers took the same lap time independently.); Brian Redman	Tojeiro EE; Jaguar E-Type	1965 BARC Croft GT race
Clubman	1:23.000	David Preston	Lotus Seven	1965 BARC Croft Sports/Clubman race
Group 1	1:25.600	Bob Smith	Austin Mini Cooper S	1965 BARC Croft Handicap race

== Rallying ==
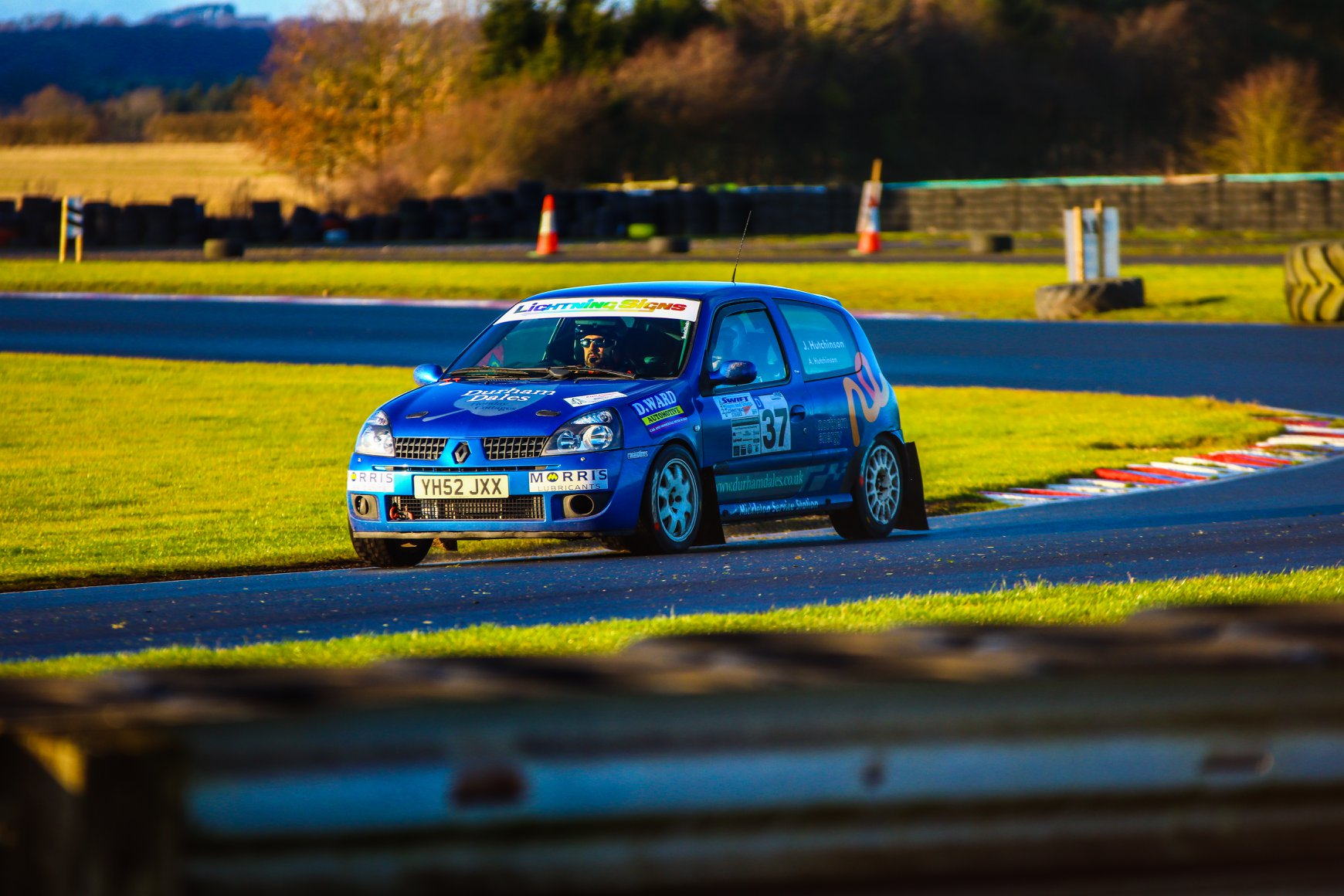
Renault Clio Rally car competing at Croft Circuit's Christmas Stages Rally 2019

Croft Circuit has hosted stage rallies since at least 1983 including 2 stages in the Network Q RAC Rally 1996.

From 2001 Croft Circuit has frequently hosted the Christmas Stages Rally organised by Northallerton Automobile Club and Jack Frost Stages Rally organised by Darlington & District Motor Club. Both events used the circuit and roads within the venue during the winter months.

In 2021 British Automobile Racing Club (BARC) boss Ben Taylor issued a statement announcing "that Croft Circuit will not host rallying or rallycross events next season". This came under much criticism from fans and competitors.

However, on 4 September 2022 Northallerton Automobile Club and Darlington & District Motor Club announced a return of stage rallying to Croft Circuit with the Swift Signs & Shirts Winter Stages Rally running on Sunday 27 November 2022.
