= Eryholme =

Village and civil parish in North Yorkshire, England

Coordinates: 54°28′28″N 1°30′20″W

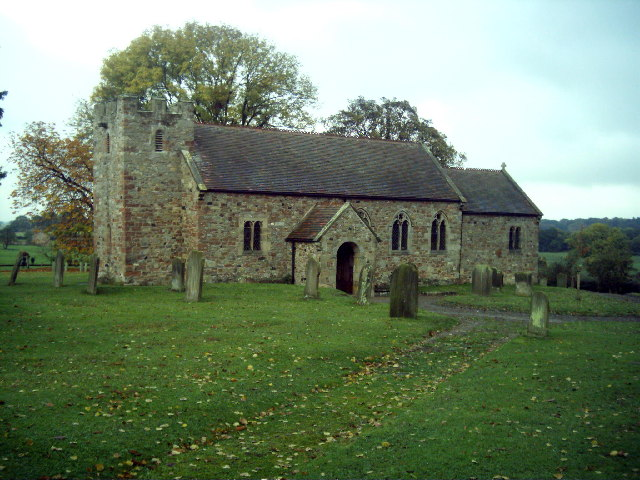
- St Mary the Virgin church, Eryholme

- Location within North Yorkshire
- Population: 80
- OS grid reference: NZ321083
- Civil parish: Eryholme
- Unitary authority: North Yorkshire
- Ceremonial county: North Yorkshire
- Region: Yorkshire and the Humber
- Country: England
- Sovereign state: United Kingdom
- Post town: DARLINGTON
- Postcode district: DL2
- Dialling code: 01325
- Police: North Yorkshire
- Fire: North Yorkshire
- Ambulance: Yorkshire
- UK Parliament: Richmond and Northallerton

Eryholme is a village and civil parish in North Yorkshire, England. As the population remained less than 100 in the 2011 census, information is included with that of Dalton-on-Tees.

The village is situated on the south bank of the River Tees, opposite Hurworth, 4.5 miles (7.2 km) south-east of Darlington. From 1974 to 2023 it was part of the district of Richmondshire, it is now administered by the unitary North Yorkshire Council.

In this part of the Tees Valley the river forms many loops called 'holmes'. The word 'holm' is of Viking origin and means "island formed by a river". Eryholme's name is, however, a corruption of its original name 'Erghum'. This name means shieling - a shelter for livestock, which comes from the Old Irish word 'airgh'. This word was introduced into Yorkshire place names by Norwegian Vikings who had lived in Ireland for a number of generations and adopted many Irish words.

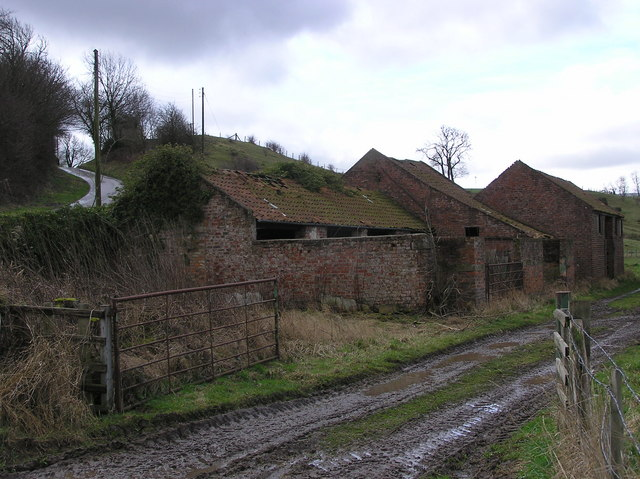
Old brickworks at Eryholme

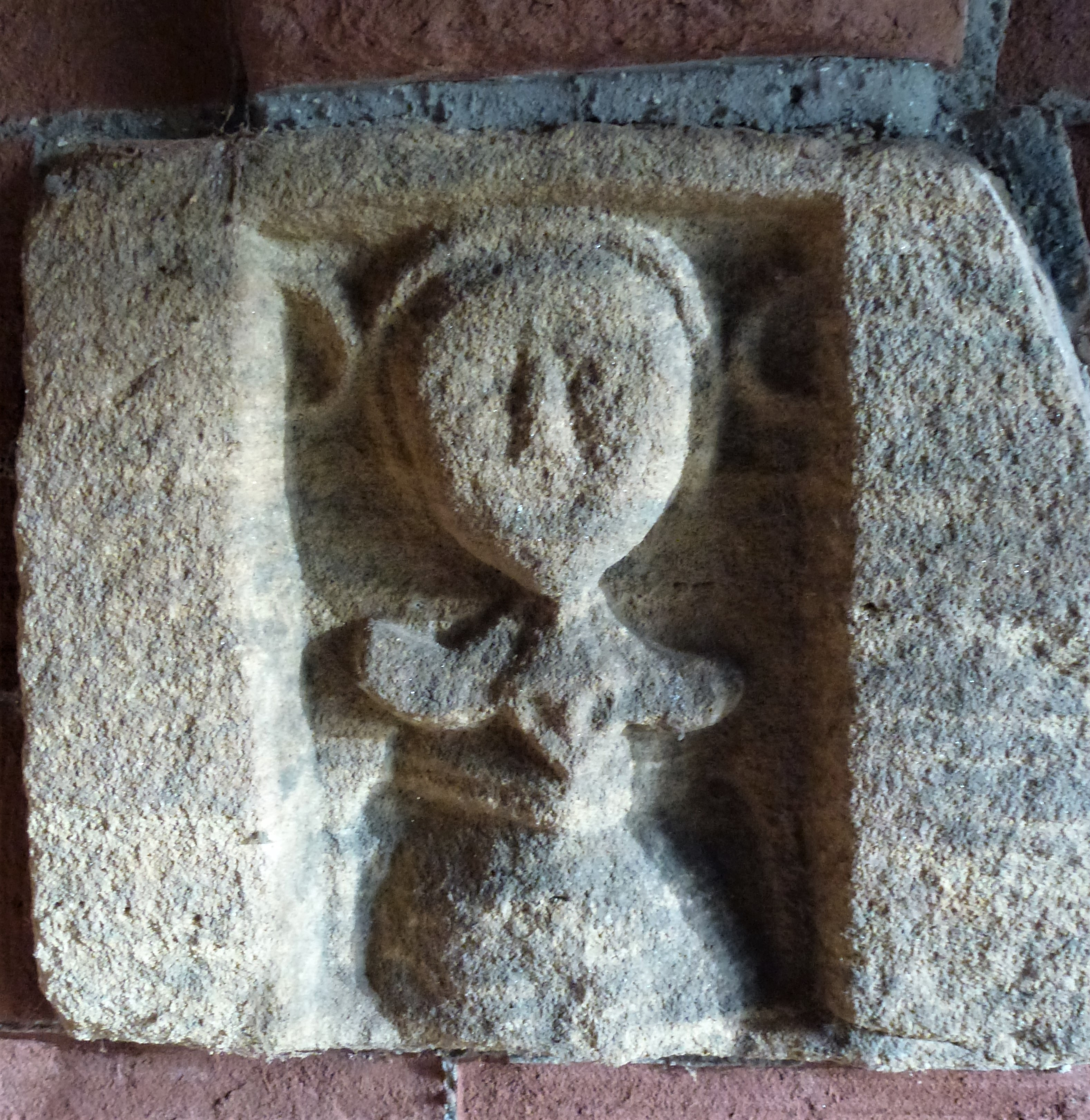
Christ and the sacred heart, c. 1200 AD, St Mary the Virgin, Eryholme

St Mary's Church is a grade II* listed plain sandstone building, originally built c.1200 and modified in the 13th, 14th and 16th centuries. Set inside the east wall of the porch is a small, ancient carving of a human figure. A distinct heart outline in the chest proves the identity of Christ. The notion of the sacred heart proliferated in the 13th century. This date is also consistent with the splayed tunic. Pevsner suggested it was Anglo-Danish but the sacred heart excludes this. It represents a time of burgeoning new religious philosophies from the Cistercian leader St Bernard of Clairvaux and the local Saint Godric of Finchale, who was in contact with the Cistercians and active in the Tees Valley. The registers at the church date from 1565.

There are the remains of a Victorian era brick and tile works in the village. There used to be a railway station called Eryholme but it was located at Dalton-on-Tees, some 1.9 miles (3 km) south-west of the village. Passenger services ceased in 1911 but were restarted during the Second World War for personnel serving at the nearby RAF Croft.

The chief activity is farming, the farms forming part of the Neasham estate owned by the Wrightson family. The village was famous for the breeding of shorthorn cattle and a cow sold to the Colling brothers became part of the original stock from which were bred the Durham Ox and Comet.

== See also ==
- Listed buildings in Eryholme
