= Catterick Military Railway =

Former railway line in Yorkshire, England

- Old railway bridge at Catterick

Overview
- Other name: Catterick Camp Military Railway
- Status: Closed
- Locale: Catterick Garrison, North Yorkshire, England.
- Termini: Catterick Bridge; Powerhouse sidings, Catterick Garrison
- Stations: 2

Service
- Operator(s): UK Government (1915–1923); London and North Eastern Railway (1923–1947); British Rail (1948–1970)

History
- Opened: 1915
- Closed: 9 February 1970

Technical
- Line length: 5 miles (8 km) 1914 – 1923; 4.5 miles (7.2 km) 1923 – 1970
- Track length: 8 mi (13 km)
- Number of tracks: 1
- Track gauge: 4 ft 8 1/2 in (1,435 mm) standard gauge
- Operating speed: 20 mph (32 km/h)

The Catterick Military Railway was a railway line in North Yorkshire, England, that connected Catterick Camp (now Catterick Garrison), with the Eryholme–Richmond line at Catterick Bridge railway station. The line was built in 1915 as a light railway to bring materials in for the building of Catterick Camp, but later became the supply route in and out of Catterick Garrison. It also had a semi-regular passenger service for military personnel, but this ceased in 1964. The line was closed and removed in 1970.

== History ==
The line was opened in 1915 and extended 4.5 miles (7.2 km) from Catterick Bridge station to a railway station in the middle of the garrison called Camp Centre, climbing steeply in its first 3 miles (5 km) at a gradient of 1-in-50, then 1-in-46. This first railway was deemed to be a 'light railway' to facilitate building the camp, and was of a 2 feet (0.61 m) gauge, but was converted to standard gauge by 1915. The line was single track throughout with some passing loops and a myriad of sidings. The main part of the line extended from Catterick Bridge to a length of 4.5 miles (7.2 km) by 1923, though accounting for siding space and loops, the total track length extended to over 8 miles (13 km). Originally, the line crossed the River Swale on Catterick Bridge, a stone bridge which dates back to the 15th century. This situation continued until 1922, when a metal bridge was built just upstream (westwards) of the stone road bridge. The bridge was built by the Cleveland Bridge & Engineering Company and was the only engineering structure of note on the entire line. It had been finished along its deck with wooden boards and due to the wooden deck, fire buckets were placed at either end of the bridge.

Just after the bridge over the River Swale, the track turned south-westwards, and from 1959, crossed the A1 road on a shared road and rail bridge known as Fort Bridge. Gravel excavation for the line was carried out in the Catterick Racecourse area, and the effects of this can be seen by the depression in the ground at the northern end of the racecourse. During the quarrying operations, many Roman artefacts were found. In December 1923, the UK government relinquished control of the railway to the London and North Eastern Railway (LNER) who operated the Eryholme to Richmond branch, and then in 1948, control of the branch passed to British Railways. A small timber-built engine shed with two roads was located near to the Walkerville crossing. Facilities were basic, but included a water tower and repair shop. The shed was closed in 1925, with the LNER maintaining their locomotives elsewhere.

Trains travelling along the Eryholme to Richmond line which needed access to the Catterick Military Railway had to reverse at milepost 6.5 (just beyond Catterick Bridge station) and needed to run around to gain access to the branch. If both running lines on the Richmond branch needed to be free, the train would be propelled a short distance onto the Catterick Military Railway, and the locomotive would run-around the train there. Trains were limited to 20 miles per hour (32 km/h) on the branch due to some of the severe gradients, although some were levelled out by the LNER in 1942. Even so, the sidings at Walkerville could only be shunted from 'down' trains (those travelling to Catterick Camp from the Richmond line) because of the steep gradient there.

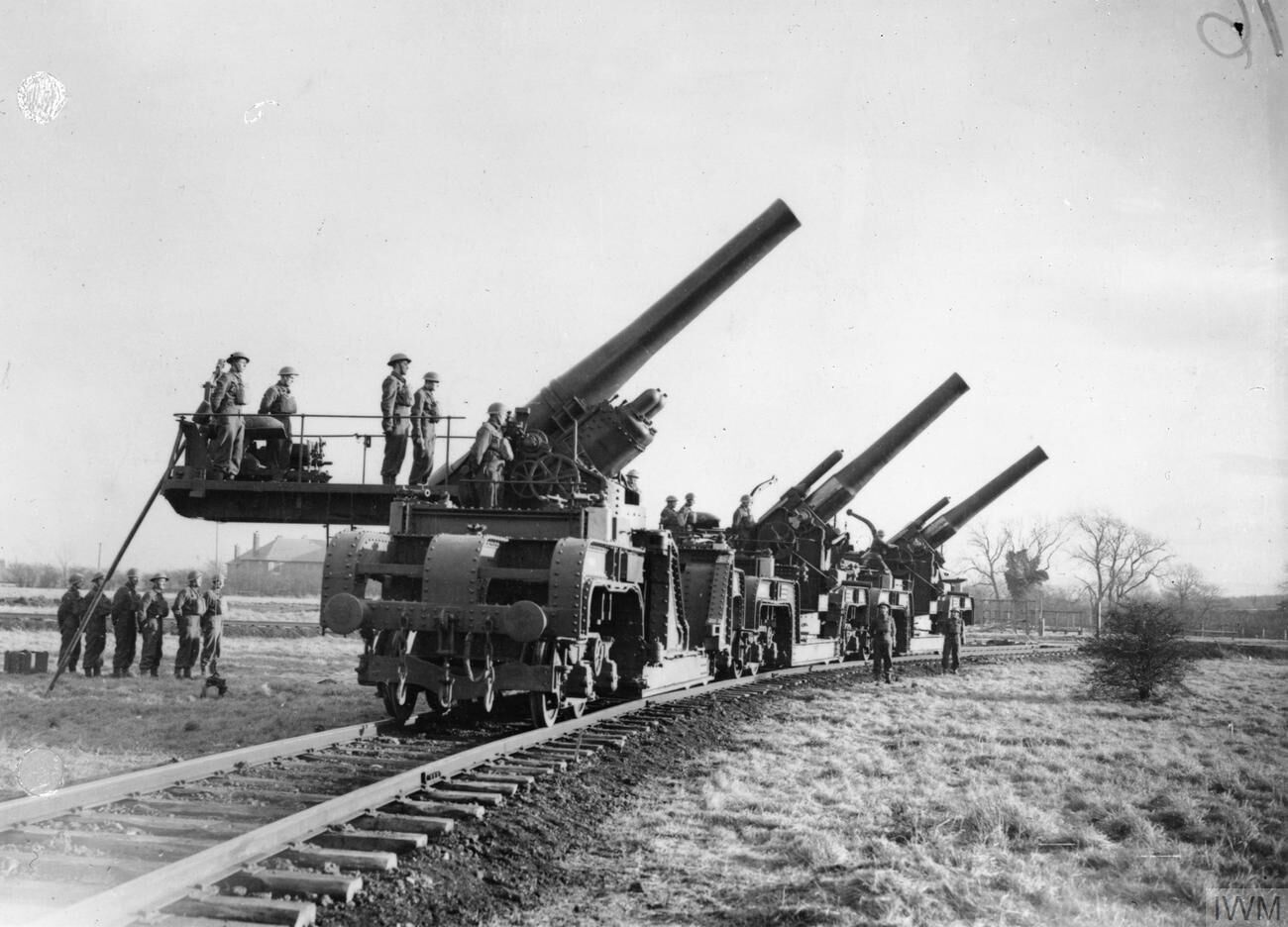
12 inch Railway Howitzers MkV Catterick 12 December 1940

The Catterick Military Railway provided the lionshare of the traffic on the Eryholme to Richmond line, both in terms of passenger numbers and trains, but also in goods traffic moved to and from Catterick Garrison. At the peak of services in 1927, sidings off the running line apart from the Camp Centre station were located at Walkerville, Arras, Helles, Messines, Vimy, Cambrai and Hipswell, with others leading to a power house, or general transfer sheds. One of the sections radiating away from the running line was used by the School of Railway Artillery for rail mounted guns. Up until 1923, there was another station called California, further west than the Camp Centre station, and some 5 miles (8 km) in total from Catterick Bridge station. However, California was last mentioned in timetables as far back as November 1919. The line into the Camp Centre station was thought to be at its busiest during late May/early June 1940, when traffic along the line was bolstered by trainloads of troops being evacuated from Dunkirk.

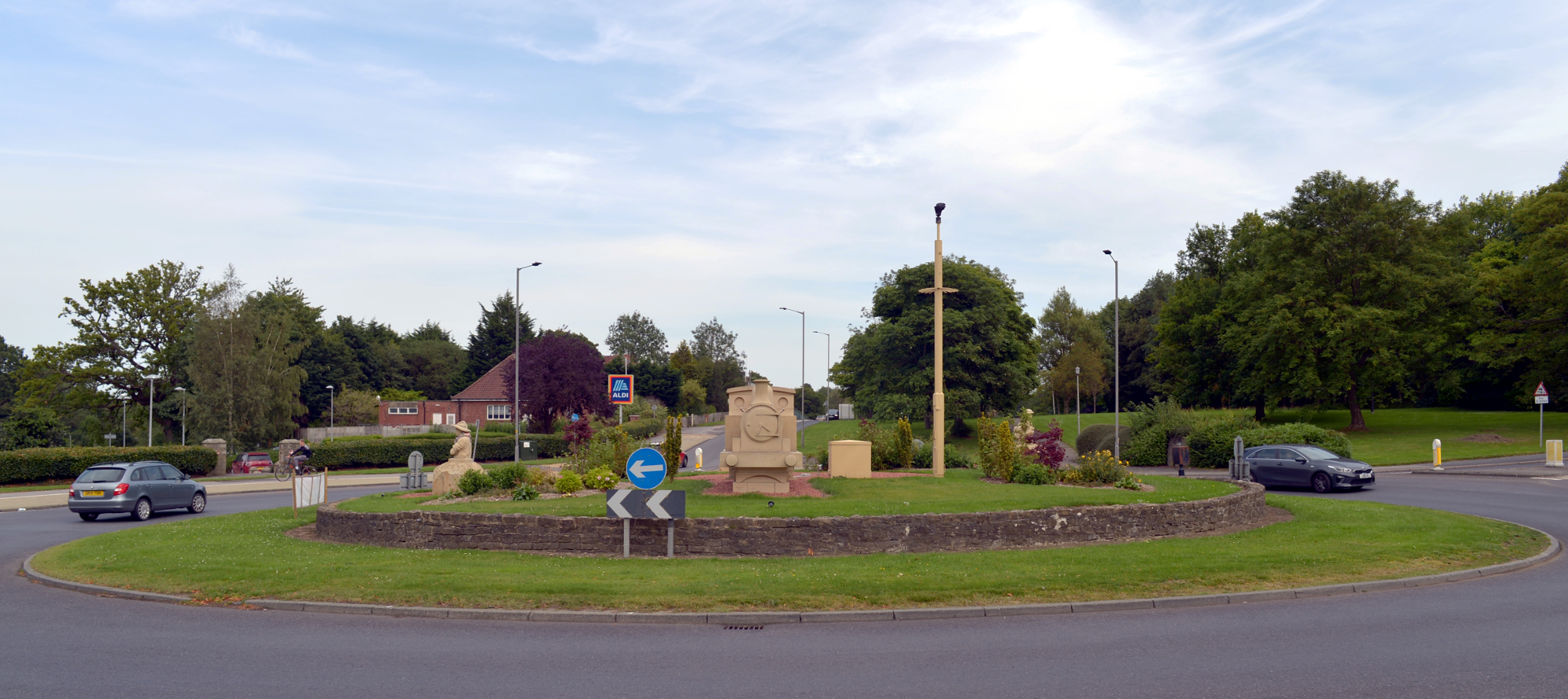
The roundabout that the line used to run through the middle of.

The line had several crossings, with most being ungated and needing watchmen to stop traffic whenever a train approached, as it had been constructed on the principle of being a light railway. Only one crossing, that at Brompton (the Farmer's Arms Crossing), was provided with crossing gates. Military personnel stationed at Catterick Camp had to be the railway picquets, a job that most described as "the worst" at the camp. During winter, when it was bitterly cold, the railway picquets would hold up lumps of coal as a sign to the fireman to throw burning coal onto the trackside to help them keep warm. The section of the route that ran from the Camp Centre towards California station and the power house, travelled through the middle of the roundabout where the A6136 road meets the Scotton Road.

Although serving soldiers and their families could use the stations at Richmond and Catterick Bridge, a direct service from Catterick Camp Centre station to Darlington railway station would run on Fridays as the Catterick Flyer. In 1951, a direct through train to Birmingham was introduced on a Friday afternoon, and though initially not heavily subscribed, the service continued throughout the early 1950s. By the end of the 1960s, the rolling stock used had "deteriorated", but it was looked upon by its users with some "affection" for the service that it provided. The prospect of the railway's closure led to questions in Parliament about patronage of the service and the financial remuneration of this to British Rail. In 1963, 10,500 single, and 21,750 return railway warrants were issued, which led to takings of £96,000 (equivalent to £1,678,000 in 2023).

In July 1957, the main station at Camp Centre was used as a disembarkation point for Queen Elizabeth II when she visited the camp in her role as commander-in-chief of three army regiments based at Catterick at that time. The last fare-paying passenger train to run on the branch from Catterick Camp Centre railway station was on 26 October 1964, though a connection to the base could still be made at Catterick Bridge station on the main branchline.

The last train to run from Catterick Camp Centre railway station was on 8 December 1969. The line was closed completely in February 1970, and demolition began in July of the same year, with all lines being completely removed by October of the same year. After closure, whenever the Queen was visiting Catterick, the Royal Train would be stabled at Bedale railway station on the Wensleydale line. The Wensleydale Line was also used from 1996 onwards to transport armoured vehicles to and from the garrison by rail, rather than by road. The MoD invested £750,000 (equivalent to £1,441,000 in 2023) for the upgraded trackwork and offloading facilities at Redmire railway station.

== Post closure ==
The railway bridge over the river at Brompton-on-Swale was re-used to carry pipes over it, but had a new deck installed in 2012, so it could become a pedestrian route.

== Accidents and incidents ==
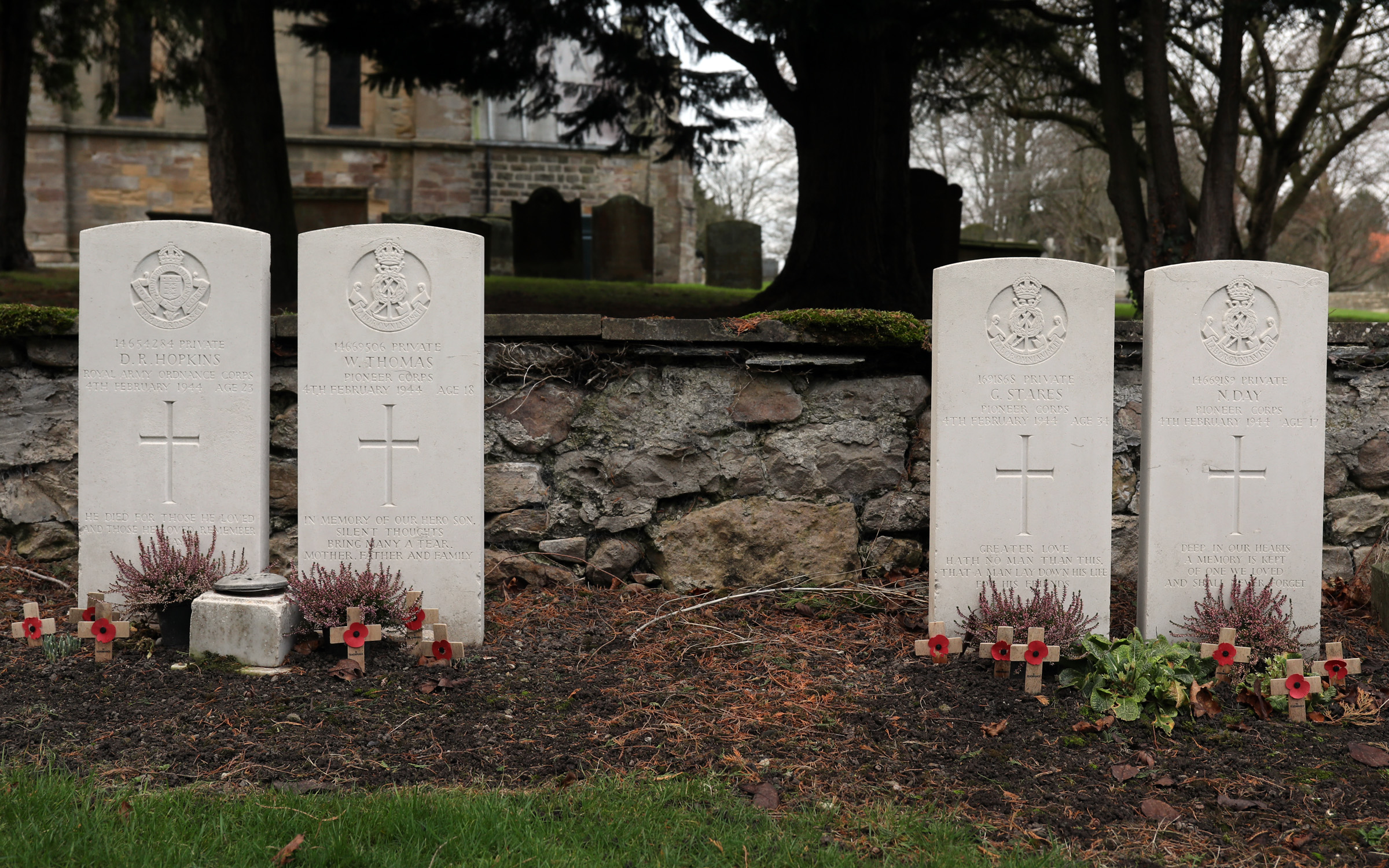
Catterick Bridge explosion graves

- 15 September 1917 – at around 4:00 am, 500 men of the Scots Guards were boarding a train at Catterick Camp Centre when the engine was uncoupled to run around the train. The brakes had not been applied properly, and several coaches ran down a gradient towards Catterick Bridge from Catterick Camp Centre. At times the coaches picked up a speed of 50 miles per hour (80 km/h) with some men jumping from the coaches befiore they picked up too much speed. The coaches derailed at different places and three passengers inside the coaches were killed. One soldier (Private Hugh Cameron) survived the crash and on leaving the stricken coach he was in, he was knocked down by a train on the adjacent line, dying of his injuries a few minutes later.
- 4 February 1944 – the Catterick Bridge explosion, which killed twelve and injured 102. Soldiers were loading ammunition onto a train in Catterick Bridge railway station yard when an explosion occurred. Witnesses reported seeing a vivid red flash, then a huge explosion which blew out the ear drums of those nearest to the blast. Four of the servicemen engaged in loading ammunition onto the train were at the epicentre of the explosion, and their remains were scattered far and wide. A pathologist identified the remains as being from at least three different people, and the body parts were buried in Hornby churchyard.

== See also ==
- Spurn Point military railway
- Strensall ranges
