= North Cowton =

Village and civil parish in North Yorkshire, England

Coordinates: 54.4291°N 1.5598°W

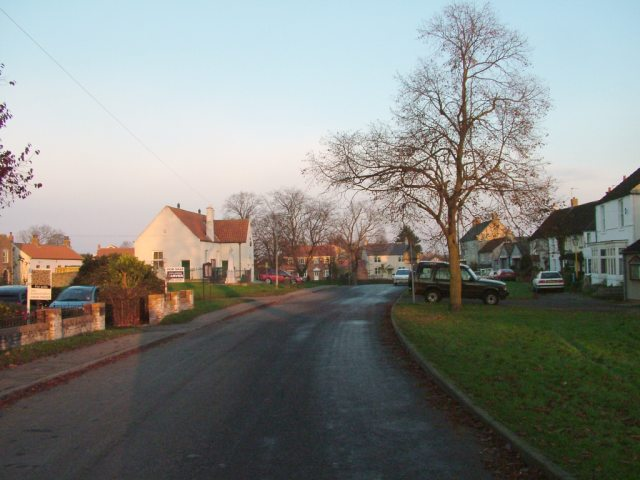
- North Cowton looking towards the village green

- Location within North Yorkshire
- Population: 503
- OS grid reference: NZ285038
  - London: 210 mi (340 km) SSE
- Unitary authority: North Yorkshire
- Ceremonial county: North Yorkshire
- Region: Yorkshire and the Humber
- Country: England
- Sovereign state: United Kingdom
- Post town: NORTHALLERTON
- Postcode district: DL7
- Dialling code: 01325
- Police: North Yorkshire
- Fire: North Yorkshire
- Ambulance: Yorkshire
- UK Parliament: Richmond and Northallerton

North Cowton is a village and civil parish, located in the county of North Yorkshire, England. It is 8 miles (13 km) north-west of the county town of Northallerton.

== History ==
The village is mentioned in the Domesday Book as Cattun. The head of the manor is noted as Gilling and lands before the Norman conquest belonged to Earl Edwin and Ulf. After 1086 the lands were granted to Count Alan of Brittany, with a small allocation to Godric, the steward and an unnamed individual. The manor became a mesne lordship and was granted to Adam de Mounchesny during the reign of Henry III. This passed to the Fitz Alan family around 1260 until the early 15th century when they were the possession of John Brough. His direct line of inheritance ceased around 1558 with the death of Sir Ralph Bulmer. Thereafter the descent followed that of the other Cowton manors nearby. The last confirmed lord of the manor was the Earl of Tyrconnel and thence possibly his cousin Walter Cecil Talbot.

The etymology of the village name is a combination of the Old English words of cū and tūn meaning Cow farm. The North is to distinguish it from other Cowtons in the area. The village was previously known as "Long Cowton" and before that "Magna Cowton".

On 22 August 1138 the English armies defeated the Scottish at nearby Cowton Moor in the Battle of the Standard. The fields behind Holywell Lane are perhaps the burial grounds for the Scottish; the medieval name for the area was "Scotch Graves". The name of a local public footpath called Cramble Cross is thought to derive from a cross marking the last stand of the Scottish soldiers. Nearly two centuries later, the Scottish had their revenge on North Cowton, raiding it regularly in the early 14th century and burning it to the ground in 1318.

The disbanded Eryholme-Richmond branch line passed nearby with a former railway station at Moulton End, around ¼ of a mile from North Cowton. The line was opened in 1846 by the York and Newcastle Railway Company. At one time 13 trains a day passed through Moulton End railway station in each direction. The line was closed in 1969. The old station house, station cottage and railway bridge are Grade II listed buildings.

== Geography and governance ==
The nearest settlements to North Cowton are East Cowton, Uckerby, Scorton, Birkby and Dalton-on-Tees which are within 3 miles (5 km) of the village. The highest point in the village is at the north on Holywell Lane, at 214 feet (65 m). The Stell has its source to the south of the village and is a tributary of the nearby River Wiske. The east end of the village lies close to the B1263 road.

The village lies within the Richmond and Northallerton UK Parliament constituency. From 1974 to 2023 it was part of the district of Richmondshire, it is now administered by the unitary North Yorkshire Council.

== Demography ==
Population
Year	1881	1891	1901	1911	1921	1931	1951	1961	2001	2011
Total	283	256	268	259	293	309	396	376	550	503

=== 2001 Census ===
According to the 2001 UK Census, the parish was 50.4% male and 49.6% female of the total population of 550. The religious make-up was 84.5% Christian with the rest stating no religion. The ethnic distribution was 100% White. There were 216 dwellings.

=== 2011 Census ===
According to the 2011 UK Census, the parish had a total population of 503 with 50.3% male and 49.7% female. The religious make-up was 68.4% Christian with the rest stating no religion. The ethnic distribution was 99.8% White with a small BAME minority. There were 223 dwellings.

== Community ==
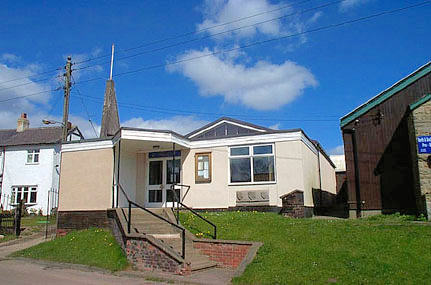
North Cowton, St Luke's Church

The local school is North and South Cowton Community Primary School which has around 40 pupils split between two sites. It is within the catchment area of Richmond School and Sixth Form College for secondary education, to the age of eighteen.

The village public house is The Herdsman. There is also a village hall, football pitch, tennis court, two children's playgrounds, a bus stop, a war memorial, two public telephone boxes, two community notice boards and two postboxes. There is a petrol station/shop just outside the village on the B1263 road. The village is served by the 72 bus service which runs between Darlington and Northallerton.

There are a number of public footpaths and bridleways, including Cramble Cross. There is also a local football team, Cowtons FC

== Religion ==
There were two churches, St Luke's Church of England and the Methodist Chapel. The chapel was built in 1827 and restored in 1881. St Luke's was built as a pastoral centre in 1968 and consecrated as the parish church on 21 October 1990. Both have since been closed, with the Parish Church of East Cowton now the designated church for the village.

== See also ==
- Listed buildings in North Cowton
- Atley Hill
- East Cowton
- South Cowton
