= Moulton End =

Hamlet in North Yorkshire, England

Coordinates: 54.429936°N 1.579166°W

- Location within North Yorkshire
- Population: 25
- OS grid reference: NZ275039
- Unitary authority: North Yorkshire
- Ceremonial county: North Yorkshire
- Region: Yorkshire and the Humber
- Country: England
- Sovereign state: United Kingdom
- Post town: Northallerton
- Postcode district: DL7
- Dialling code: 01325
- Police: North Yorkshire
- Fire: North Yorkshire
- Ambulance: Yorkshire
- UK Parliament: Richmond and Northallerton

Moulton End is a hamlet in North Yorkshire, in England. From 1974 to 2023 it was part of the district of Richmondshire, it is now administered by the unitary North Yorkshire Council.

The hamlet gradually built up around the now disused railway station formerly serving North Cowton. The station was part of the disbanded Eryholme-Richmond branch line, which also used to serve Catterick Garrison. The station building is now a residential property, the platform clock is still visible on the wall of the Station house. The Darlington-bound platform still survives, but it is heavily overgrown with trees and bushes. The Richmond platform has been incorporated into a boundary wall to Station House.

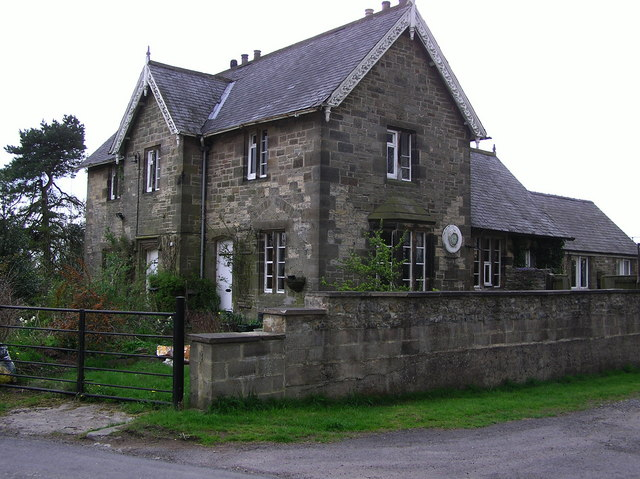
The former stationhouse at Moulton End
