= Catterick Camp railway station =

Former rail station in North Yorkshire, England

Catterick Camp

General information
- Location: Catterick Camp, North Yorkshire; England
- Coordinates: 54.373623°N 1.718498°W
- Grid reference: SE183976
- Platforms: 1

Other information
- Status: Disused

Key dates
- 1915: opened
- 1964: closed
Location

Catterick Camp railway station was a railway station in North Yorkshire, England. It was built as the terminus of the sub branch of the Eryholme-Richmond branch line to serve Catterick Camp, now Catterick Garrison. Along with the rest of the stations on the branch it was closed in 1964, but the line remained open until December 1969. The station had one narrow platform, and at the eastern end was a red-brick ticket office which was 18 feet (5.5 m) long. The original platform was made from wood, but was rebuilt in brick by Italian prisoners of war in 1943.

On 15 September 1917, a set of carriages ran away from the station and were derailed. According to the Darlington & Stockton Times of 22 September 1917, four soldiers were killed although one report claims three people were killed.

Preceding station	Disused railways	Following station
Brompton Road Halt	Catterick Camp Military Railway	Terminus
