= Brompton Road Halt railway station =

Disused railway station in North Yorkshire, England

Brompton Road Halt
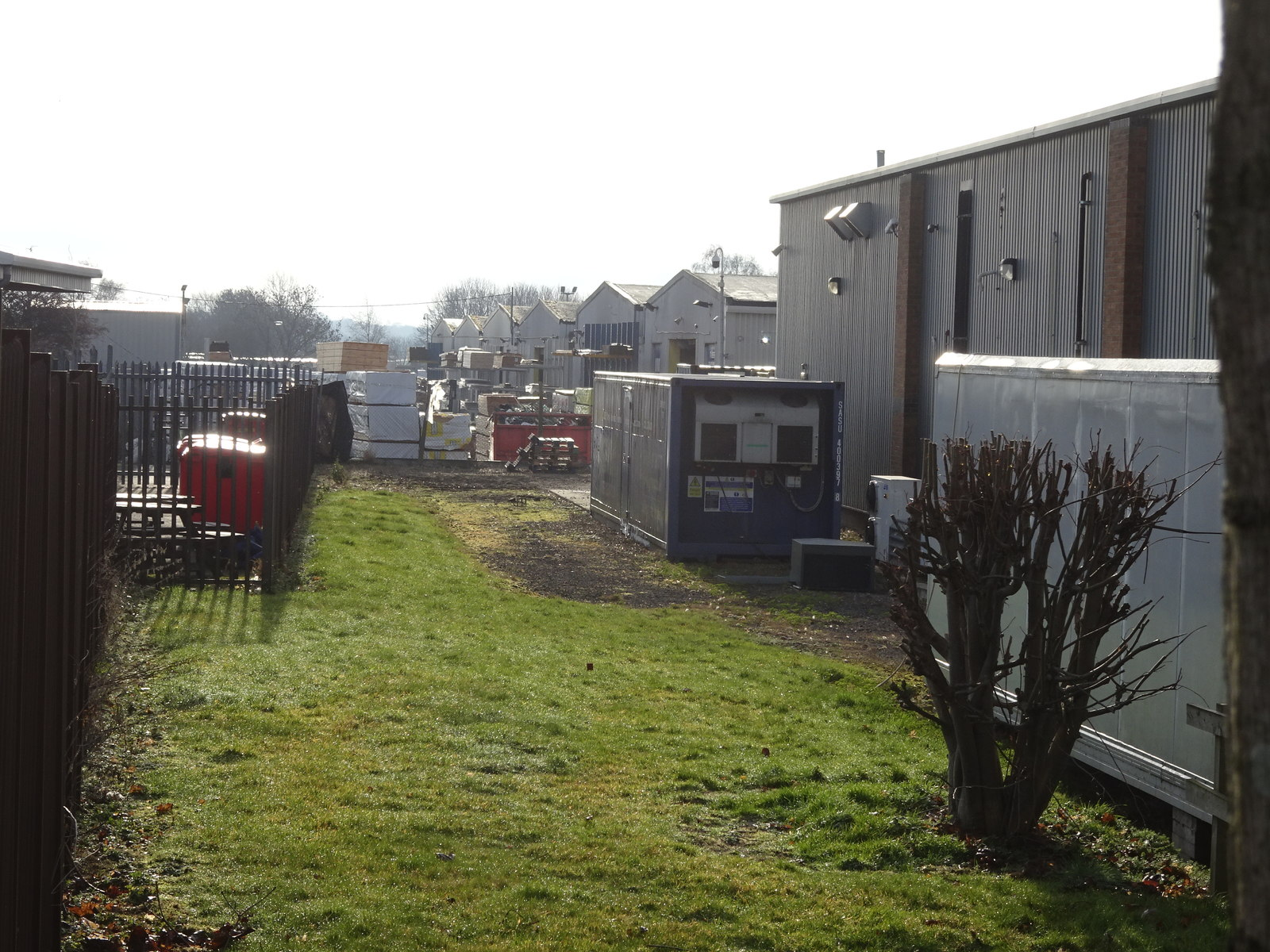
- Second site of the former station (2019)

General information
- Location: Brompton-on-Swale, North Yorkshire; England
- Coordinates: 54.394°N 1.658°W
- Grid reference: SE223998
- Platforms: 1

Other information
- Status: Disused

History
- Original company: Catterick Camp Military Railway
Location

Brompton Road Halt (or Brompton Road Platform) was a railway station in North Yorkshire, England. It was located on the Catterick Camp (now Catterick Garrison) sub branch of the Eryholme-Richmond branch line and served the village of Brompton-on-Swale.

The station opened together with the line in 1915 and was also known in timetables as Catterick Bridge. It was situated just south of Catterick Bridge goods yard and had a timber platform, a small booking office and a ground frame. Passengers changing trains here had to walk a short distance to or from Catterick Bridge station, through troop trains did not stop here. In 1943 it was resited south of Brompton Road. The new station had a brick and concrete platform and a ground level signal box with a four-lever frame next to the level crossing. The line closed in 1964, and the tracks were lifted in 1970. In 1988 the platform was demolished.

Preceding station	Disused railways	Following station
Catterick Bridge	Catterick Camp Military Railway	Catterick Camp
