= Listed buildings in North Cowton =

North Cowton is a civil parish in the county of North Yorkshire, England. It contains eight listed buildings that are recorded in the National Heritage List for England. All the listed buildings are designated at Grade II, the lowest of the three grades, which is applied to "buildings of national importance and special interest". The parish contains the village of North Cowton and the surrounding countryside. The listed buildings consist of houses, a cottage, a farmhouse, a railway bridge, a former railway station and a war memorial.

== Buildings ==
| Name and location | Photograph | Date | Notes |
|---|---|---|---|
| Town End Cottage; 54.42937°N 1.56054°W | — | Mid to late 18th century | The cottage is in brick, with stepped eaves and a pantile roof with a raised verge on the left. There are two storeys and two bays. The doorway is in the centre, the ground floor windows are casements under brick segmental arches, and on the upper floor are horizontally-sliding sash windows. |
| Cobbler's House; 54.43019°N 1.56418°W | | Late 18th century | The house is in brick with stepped eaves and a pantile roof with shaped kneelers and stone coping. There are two storeys and five bays. The doorway has a four-pane fanlight, and the windows are sashes, those on the upper floor horizontally-sliding. |
| Haughton House; 54.43000°N 1.56281°W | — | Late 18th century | The house is in roughcast stone, with stepped eaves, and a Westmorland slate roof with shaped kneelers and stone coping. There are three storeys and two bays and a two-storey rear outshut. The central doorway has a stone surround, a six-pane fanlight and a tripartite keystone. The windows are sashes in architraves, with flat brick arches. |
| Manor House; 54.42520°N 1.58420°W | — | Late 18th to early 19th century | The farmhouse is in brick with a tile roof. There are two storeys, and two ranges of two bays each, the left range lower. The right range has stepped eaves, the roof with shaped kneelers and stone coping, and it contains sash windows with flat arches. In the left range are a casement window and a doorway on the ground floor, and a shuttered opening and a horizontally-sliding sash window above. |
| Town End Farmhouse; 54.42939°N 1.56069°W | — | Early 19th century | The house is in brick, with a dog-tooth cornice, and a pantile roof with shaped kneelers and stone coping. In the centre is a doorway with a fanlight, and the windows are sashes. |
| Railway bridge 54.43556°N 1.56473°W | | c. 1846 | The bridge carries Holywell Lane over a disused railway line built for the Great North of England Railway. It is in sandstone, and consists of a single segmental arch with stepped voussoirs flanked by pilasters. The bridge has a band, and parapets with wedge-shaped coping. |
| Station House and Station Cottage; 54.43033°N 1.57895°W | | c. 1846 | A railway station, later a house and cottage, designed by G. T. Andrews for the Great North of England Railway. It is in stone with quoins and a Welsh slate roof. There are two storeys, a range of three bays facing the road, the middle bay projecting and gabled, and a single-storey range at the rear. The doorway has a chamfered quoined surround and a Tudor arched head, the windows are mullioned, and the gable has decorative bargeboards. In the right return is a canted bay window and a clock. |
| War memorial 54.43004°N 1.56378°W | | 1921 | The war memorial is in white marble, and is about 3 metres (9.8 ft) tall. It consists of a tapering pillar with a crown top, on which is a draped urn encircled by a carved wreath. It stands on a square plinth on a base of two steps. On the pillar is an inscription, the plinth carries the names of those lost in the First World War, and on the top step is an inscription and the names of those lost in the Second World War. The memorial stands in an area paved with sandstone flags, and is enclosed by iron railings. |
