= Croft Spa railway station =

Former railway station in England

Croft Spa
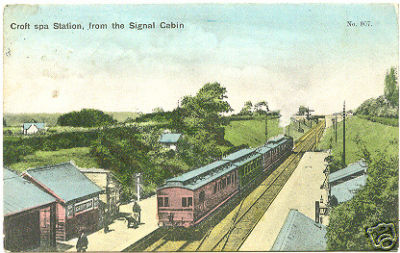
- Croft Spa station from the signal cabin in 1908

General information
- Location: Croft-on-Tees, Darlington; England
- Coordinates: 54.4830°N 1.5504°W
- Grid reference: NZ292099
- Platforms: 2

Other information
- Status: Disused

History
- Original company: Great North of England Railway
- Pre-grouping: North Eastern Railway
- Post-grouping: London and North Eastern Railway

Key dates
- 30 March 1841: Station opened as Croft
- 1 October 1896: Station renamed Croft Spa
- 3 March 1969: Station closed
Location

Croft Spa railway station was a railway station serving the settlements of Croft-on-Tees and Hurworth-on-Tees in County Durham, England.

The station was located on the East Coast Main Line between Northallerton and Darlington. It was served by local trains on the East Coast Main Line, and also trains operating the Eryholme-Richmond branch line.

== History ==
The first railway to Croft-on-Tees was built by the coal-carrying Stockton and Darlington Railway (S&DR) to carry coal to the yard adjacent to the bridge over the Tees at Croft, for subsequent distribution by road to North Yorkshire. The Croft branch left the main line to the South, near Darlington Bank Top station. A passenger station opened on 27 October 1829.

The section of the Great North of England Railway (GNoER) between Darlington and York opened (for goods traffic only) on 4 January 1841; and passenger trains along the line were introduced on 30 March 1841, when a station at Croft was opened by the GNoER, which allowed the S&DR passenger station to be closed on the same day. The GNoER, after a series of amalgamations, became part of the North Eastern Railway (NER) when that was formed in 1854. The NER renamed the station Croft Spa on 1 October 1896; after it gained popularity for its spa waters, the site of which was very close to the railway station. At the start of 1923, the NER amalgamated with other railways to form the London and North Eastern Railway during the Grouping. Passing on to the Eastern Region of British Railways on nationalisation in 1948. In 1958 local trains between Northallerton and Darlington ceased stopping and it was then served only by trains to and from the Richmond branch until its closure by the British Railways Board on 3 March 1969.

The station was demolished in 1970 leaving no trace of its existence except for the ramps from a railway bridge down to the remains of the platforms but trains still pass the site on the East Coast Main Line.

== See also ==
- List of closed railway lines in Great Britain
- List of closed railway stations in Britain

Preceding station	Historical railways	Following station
Eryholme; Line open, station closed	North Eastern Railway; East Coast Main Line	Darlington Bank Top; Line and station open
