= Catterick Bridge railway station =

Disused railway station in North Yorkshire, England

Catterick Bridge
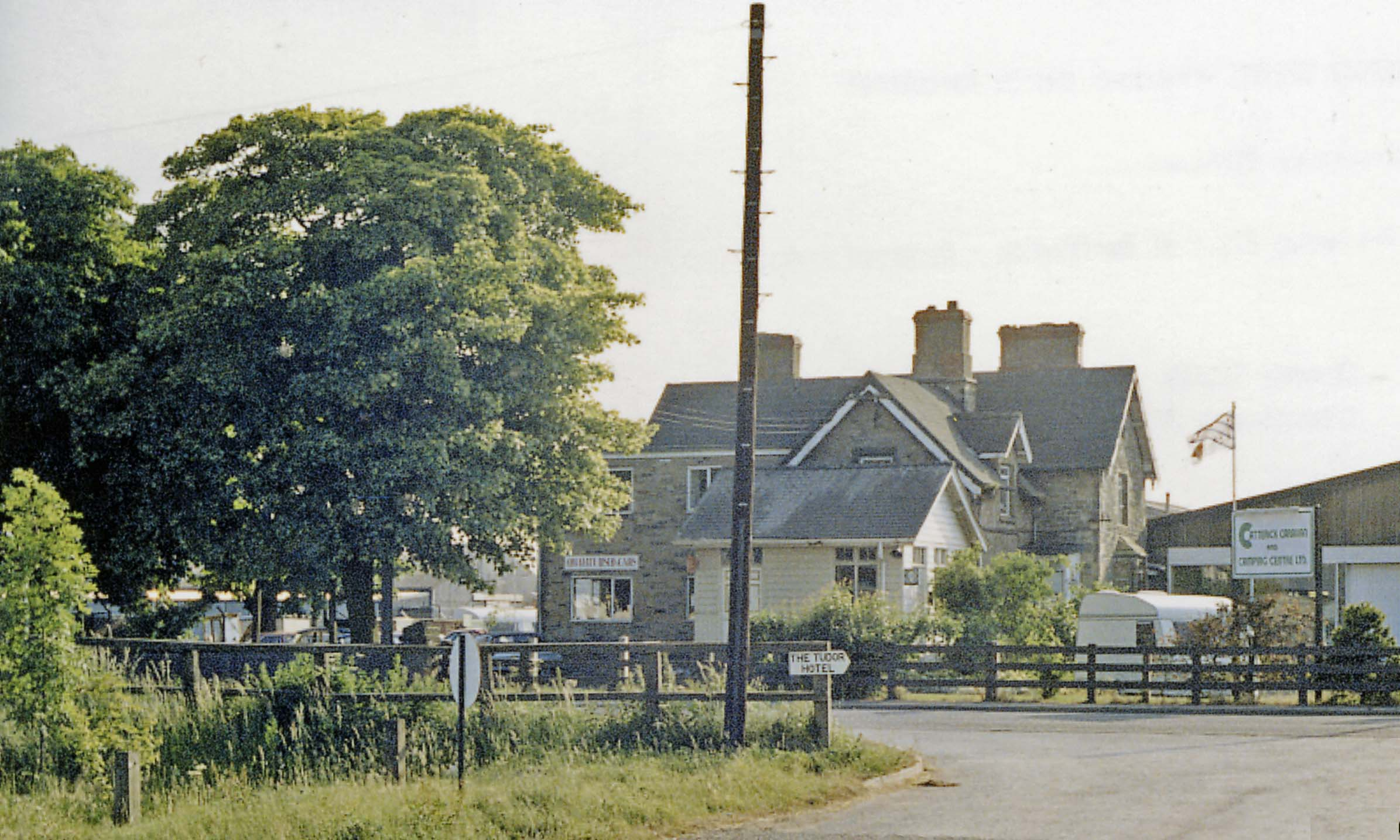
- The station buildings in 1988

General information
- Location: Brompton-on-Swale, North Yorkshire; England
- Coordinates: 54.395600°N 1.654739°W
- Grid reference: NZ225000
- Platforms: 2

Other information
- Status: Disused

History
- Original company: York and Newcastle Railway
- Pre-grouping: North Eastern Railway
- Post-grouping: London and North Eastern Railway

Key dates
- 1846: opened
- 1969: closed to passengers
- February 1970: closed for freight
Location

Catterick Bridge railway station was a railway station in North Yorkshire, England. It was built to serve the villages of Brompton-on-Swale and Catterick. The station was near the junction between the main branch line towards Richmond and a sub-branch line called Catterick Camp Military Railway to what is now Catterick Garrison.

== History ==
The station was once part of the Eryholme-Richmond branch line, built by the York and Newcastle Railway in 1846. Like most of the infrastructure of the line, Catterick Bridge station was built in the Tudor Style.

On 4 February 1944, an ammunition train exploded in the station whist it was being loaded by four Army Privates. In all twelve people were killed in the explosion (including the four army Privates) with 102 being injured.

The Richmond branch line closed for passenger trains in 1969 but goods trains ran to Catterick Bridge until the following year.

== Present ==
The station was demolished soon after the line it served was closed, although some evidence still remains. A caravan and motorhome dealer now occupy the site of the station.

Preceding station	Disused railways	Following station
Scorton	Eryholme–Richmond line	Richmond
Terminus	Catterick Camp Military Railway	Brompton Road Halt
