= Scorton railway station =

Disused railway station in North Yorkshire, England

Scorton
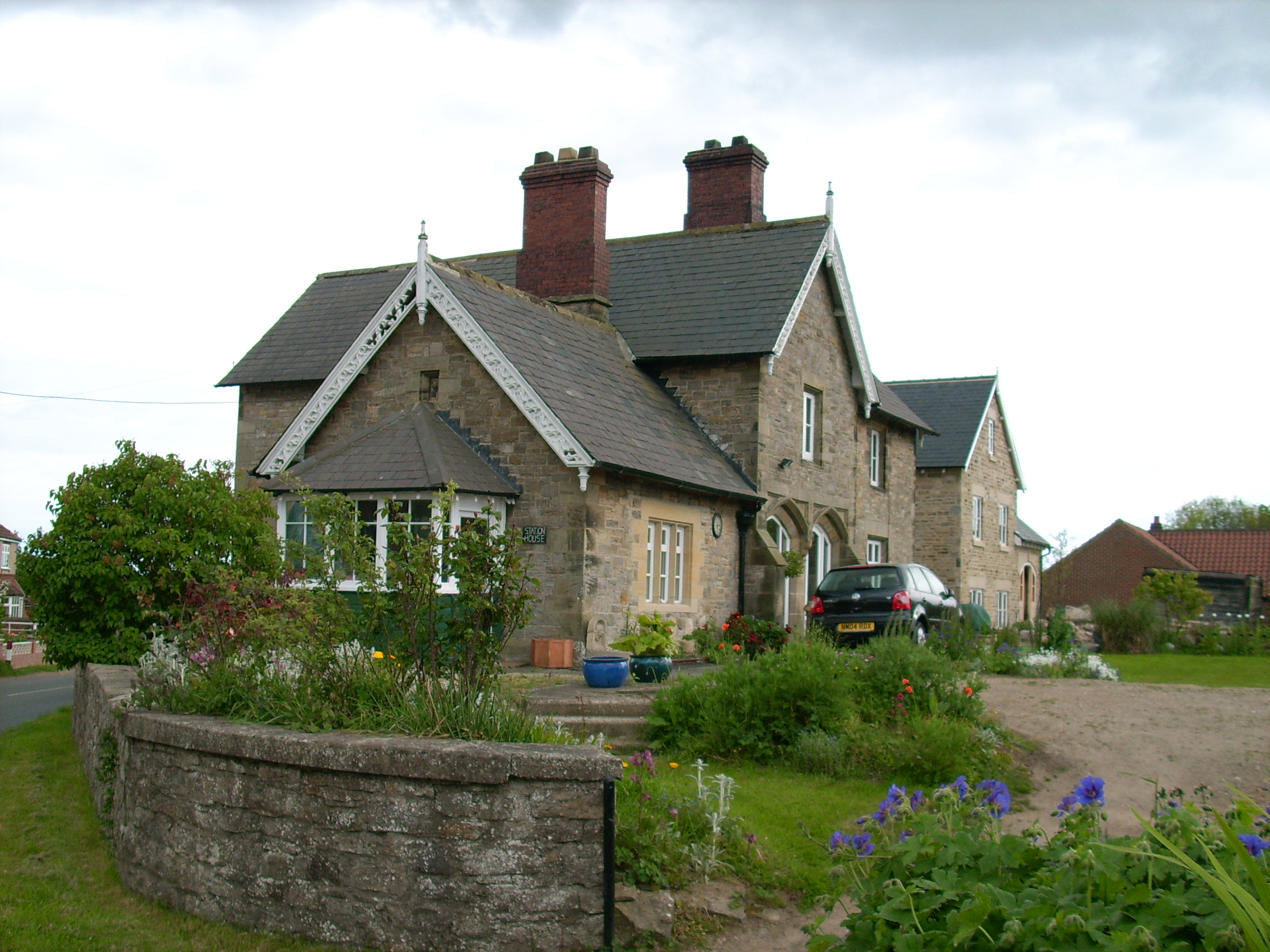
- Scorton railway station in 2007

General information
- Location: Scorton, North Yorkshire; England
- Coordinates: 54.408000°N 1.616583°W
- Grid reference: NZ249014
- Platforms: 2

Other information
- Status: Disused

History
- Original company: York and Newcastle Railway
- Pre-grouping: North Eastern Railway
- Post-grouping: London and North Eastern Railway

Key dates
- 1846: opened
- 1969: closed
Location

Scorton railway station (North Yorkshire) was a railway station in North Yorkshire, England. The village of Scorton is situated around 1/2 mile (0.8 km) south from the site of the station, although the site is just within the neighbouring civil parish of Uckerby.

== History ==
The station was once part of the Eryholme-Richmond branch line, built by the York and Newcastle Railway in 1846. Like most of the infrastructure of the line, Scorton station was built in the Tudor Style. The station was located 9 miles 56 chains (15.6 km) down the line from Darlington. The station buildings were just to the north of the village, and on the 'down' side of the station on the Richmond bound platform. The station buildings also included a pub, the St Cuthbert's Inn, which was named after a well in the field behind the inn and station buildings. Passenger traffic to the station was buoyed by pupils going to and from the grammar school, passenger traffic for the Hospital of St John and God, and during the Second World War, service personnel for RAF Scorton.

The station had a goods yard with a connection that faced westwards. Records show that the station could handle livestock as well as general goods, with hay, clover and barley being the main commodities railed from the station. The goods yard closed in August 1965.

Passenger services on the Richmond branch line were withdrawn on 3 March 1969, however, freight traffic continued for another year, lasting until early 1970.

== Present ==
The station is now a residential property, the waiting room is now the lounge and the platforms are garden features. It is a Grade II listed building.

Much of the trackbed to the west of Scorton station has been destroyed by sand and gravel quarrying.

== See also ==
- List of closed railway lines in Great Britain
- List of closed railway stations in Britain
- Listed buildings in Uckerby

| Preceding station | Disused railways | Following station |
|---|---|---|
| Moulton | Eryholme-Richmond branch line | Catterick Bridge |
