= St Mary's Church, Eryholme =

Church in Eryholme, North Yorkshire, England

Coordinates: 54.4754°N 1.5067°W

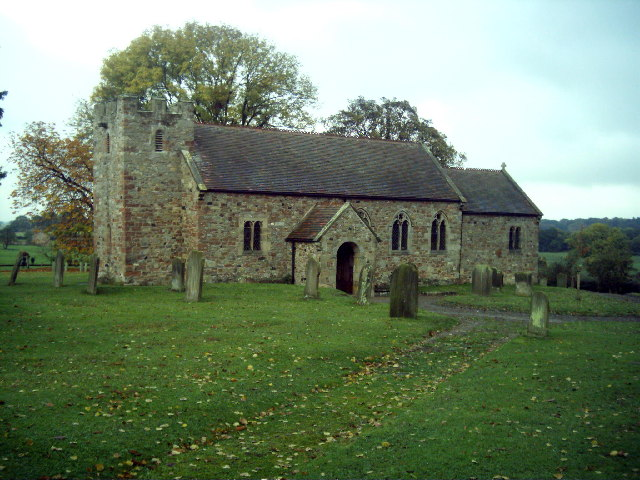
The church, in 2005

St Mary's Church is an Anglican church in Eryholme, a village in North Yorkshire, in England.

The church lies on high ground, and is set back from the village's main street. The village was recorded in the Domesday Book and appears to have had a church at the time, a chapel of ease to St Agatha's Church, Gilling West. The oldest surviving above-ground part of the current church is the north arcade, constructed in about 1200, but the foundations of the nave and chancel may be earlier. The very short tower probably dates from later in the 13th century. The nave and chancel were rebuilt in the 14th century, perhaps following a purported Scottish raid on the village in 1319. A belfry was added in the 16th century. In 1887, the church was finally given its own parish, but by this time it was in poor repair. In about 1890, the church was heavily restored, with a new vestry, porch and roof added, a new tower arch, some of the windows replaced, and the floor lowered by one foot. The building was grade II* listed in 1968.

It is built in red and brown sandstone with tiled roofs, and consists of a nave, a north aisle, a south porch, a chancel with a north vestry, and a west tower. The tower is low and small, with two stages, quoins, a round-arched bell opening on the west and north sides, each with a chamfered surround and stone slate louvres, and an embattled parapet. Some medieval material has been repositioned inside the porch, including a human figure known as the "Eryholme Madonna". This is of uncertain date, but may well be late mediaeval work associated with the Virgin Mary. Inside the church is a simple font, dating from about 1200.

== See also ==
- Grade II* listed churches in North Yorkshire (district)
- Listed buildings in Eryholme
