= Listed buildings in Uckerby =

Uckerby is a civil parish in the county of North Yorkshire, England. It contains four listed buildings that are recorded in the National Heritage List for England. All the listed buildings are designated at Grade II, the lowest of the three grades, which is applied to "buildings of national importance and special interest". The parish contains the hamlet of Uckerby and the surrounding countryside, and the listed buildings consist of a former railway station and associated structures, and a house.

== Buildings ==
Name and location	Photograph	Date	Notes
Uckerby Hall; 54.41738°N 1.61862°W	—	Early 19th century	A house and a cottage incorporated into the house, in brick, with stepped eaves, and pantile roofs with raised verges. There are two storeys and the main house has three bays. In the centre is a Doric porch, and the windows are sashes, the middle window on the upper floor with a round-arched head. The former cottage is recessed on the right, it is lower, and has one bay. It contains a blocked doorway, a casement window on the ground floor and a horizontally sliding sash above.
Station House; 54.40780°N 1.61662°W		c.1846	Originally Scorton railway station, later converted for residential use, it is in stone with Welsh slate roofs, and was designed by G. T. Andrews for the Great North of England Railway. The house is in Jacobethan style, it is in one and two storeys, and has a T-shaped plan. The front has three bays. The left bay has one storey, and contains a clock. The middle bay projects under a gable with bargeboards, and contains a two-bay arcade and a Tudor arched doorway, and the third has windows and a single-story rear outshut.
Former coal staithes 54.40770°N 1.61676°W	—	c.1846	The coal staithes were built for the Great North of England Railway, and are now derelict. They are in stone and consist of seven bays, the left four complete.
Wall, gate piers and gate post, Station House; 54.40752°N 1.61651°W	—	c.1846	The wall to the east of the former station yard was designed by G. T. Andrews for the Great North of England Railway. It is in coped stone, it extends for about 25 metres (82 ft), and is about 1.5 metres (4 ft 11 in) in height. The gate piers flanking the entrance to the drive at the south end are in stone with a square plan, cornices and pyramidal caps. There is a cast iron gate post about 2 metres (6 ft 7 in) in height with five rear projections, and a semicircular cap with a knob finial.
