= Uckerby =

Hamlet and civil parish in North Yorkshire, England

Coordinates: 54.41554°N 1.62272°W

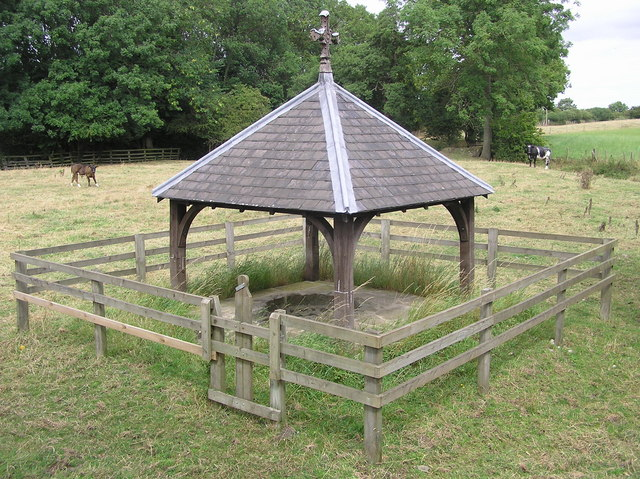
- St. Cuthbert's Well, Cuddy Keld in the parish of Uckerby

- Location within North Yorkshire
- OS grid reference: NZ245022
- Unitary authority: North Yorkshire
- Ceremonial county: North Yorkshire
- Region: Yorkshire and the Humber
- Country: England
- Sovereign state: United Kingdom
- Post town: RICHMOND
- Postcode district: DL10
- Police: North Yorkshire
- Fire: North Yorkshire
- Ambulance: Yorkshire

Uckerby is a hamlet and civil parish in the county of North Yorkshire, England. It situated at a crossroads on the road between Scorton and Moulton. The hamlet lies 9.2 miles (14.8 km) north west of the county town of Northallerton.

== History ==
Uckerby first appears on record as Ukerby, in 1198. The place name is derived from two Old Norse elements: the first is thought to be an unattested Old Norse personal name, either *Úkyrri or *Útkári; the second element is býr, meaning farmstead.

The hamlet was once part of the parish of Catterick, but was included in the Bolton-on-Swale parish in the late nineteenth century. In the 13th century the land was held as part of the FitzAlan fee of the manor of Catterick, with the tenants having the same name as the hamlet. The manor had passed to Andrew de Harcla, Earl of Carlisle by the start of the next century, but had to be forfeited when he was defeated in the rebellion against Edward II. The manor then became the possession of the Scrope family of Bolton and followed the descent of the manor of Ellerton-on-Swale until its sale around 1734 to Henry Foster. It was briefly held by James Riddell and his son from 1777 to around 1872 before being bought once again by the lord of the manor of Ellerton-on-Swale.

== Governance ==
The hamlet lies within the Richmond UK Parliament constituency. From 1974 to 2023 it was part of the district of Richmondshire, it is now administered by the unitary North Yorkshire Council.

== Geography ==
The hamlet lies 9.2 miles (14.8 km) north west of the county town of Northallerton. The parish is sandwiched between those of Moulton and Scorton. Ings Beck and Moulton Beck form a confluence to the east of the hamlet called Uckerby Beck, which eventually flow to the River Swale.

Both of the minor roads that cross the main road are dead ends. The one that leads off to the west ends up in a farm yard, it is possible to follow a very rarely used footpath from here to Gatherley Road in Brompton-on-Swale. The other road which leads off to the east gradually turns into a farmers track and then into a public footpath which leads to another hamlet, Moulton End near North Cowton.

=== Demography ===
Population
Year	1881	1891	1901	1911	1921	1931	1951	1961
Total	38	39	35	44	41	53	51	43

== See also ==
- Listed buildings in Uckerby
