= Listed buildings in Eryholme =

Eryholme is a civil parish in the county of North Yorkshire, England. It contains four listed buildings that are recorded in the National Heritage List for England. Of these, one is listed at Grade II*, the middle of the three grades, and the others are at Grade II, the lowest grade. The parish contains the village of Eryholme and the surrounding countryside, and the listed buildings consist of a church, a farmhouse, farm buildings, and a pump with a tank.

== Key ==
Grade	Criteria
II*	Particularly important buildings of more than special interest
II	Buildings of national importance and special interest

== Buildings ==
Name and location	Photograph	Date	Notes	Grade
St Mary's Church; 54.47541°N 1.50668°W		c. 1200	The church has been altered and extended through the centuries, including a restoration in 1889. It is built in red and brown sandstone] with tiled roofs, and consists of a nave, a north aisle, a south porch, a chancel with a north vestry, and a west tower. The tower is low and small, with two stages, quoins, a round-arched bell opening on the west and north sides, each with a chamfered surround and stone slate louvres, and an embattled parapet. Some medieval material has been repositioned inside the porch.	II*
Low Hail Farmhouse; 54.48190°N 1.52500°W		Early 18th century	The farmhouse, which was later extended, is in red sandstone and brick, with quoins, and a tile roof with raised verges, reverse-crowstepped gables and shaped kneelers. There are two storeys, an L-shaped plan, and a front of four bays. On the front is a doorway with Tuscan pilasters, a fanlight, a frieze and a cornice. To the right is a canted bay window, and the other windows are sashes in architraves.	II
Stable and granary, Low Hail Farm; 54.48196°N 1.52533°W	—	Early to mid 18th century	The stable with a granary above, is in red sandstone, and has a pantile roof with raised verges and reverse-crowstepped gables. There are two storeys and eight bays. It contains stable doors, other openings with segmental heads, and on the right return are external steps.	II
Pump and tank 54.47409°N 1.50617°W	—	Mid 19th century	The water pump is in cast iron, and has a circular stem with a fluted top and a fluted finial, and the spout has acanthus decoration. The tank is in wrought iron with a rectangular plan, two bars across the top, and a semicircular indentation at the far end.	II
