= Catterick Bridge explosion =

1944 railway explosion in North Yorkshire, England

Catterick Bridge Explosion
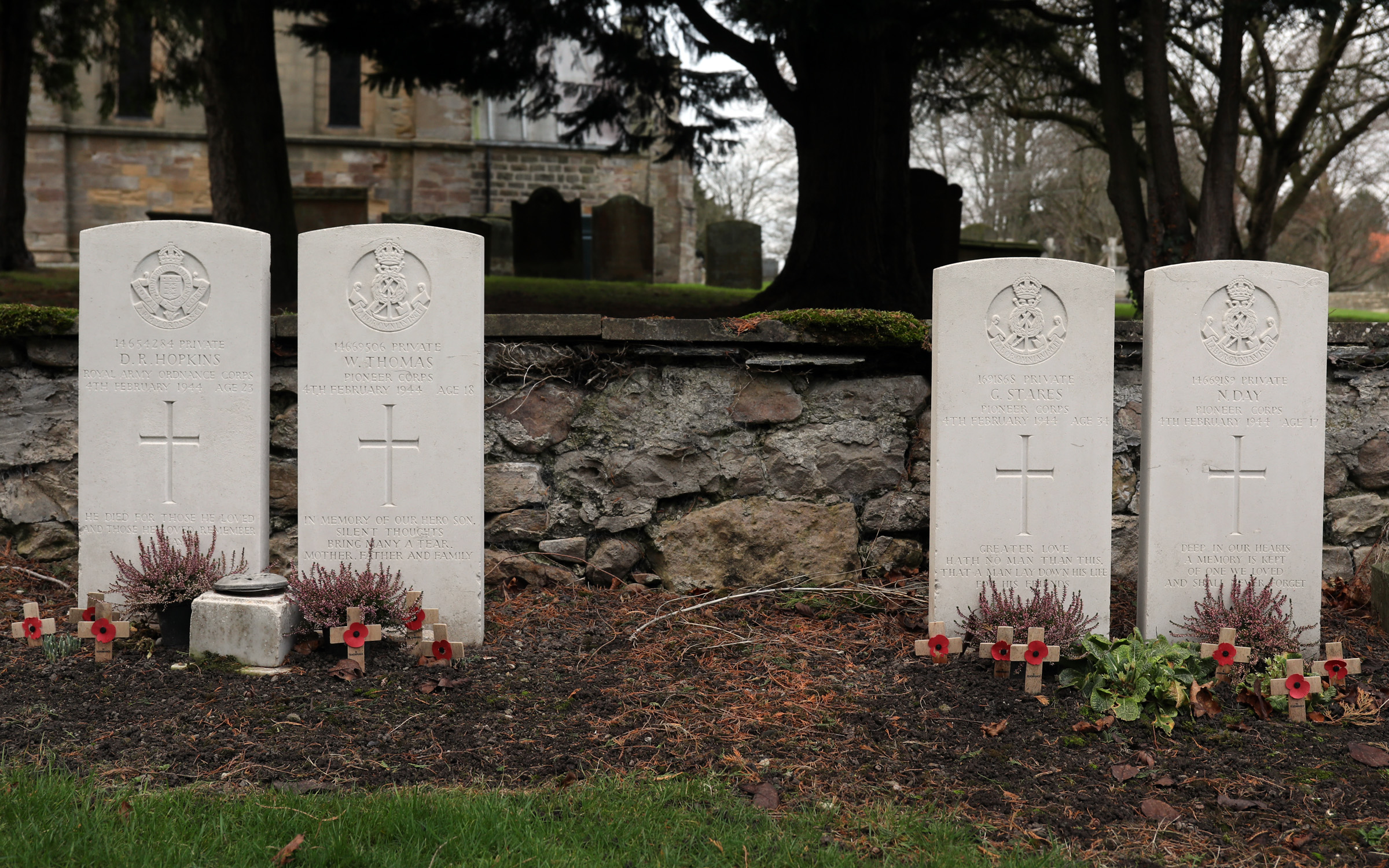
- The four graves containing the remains of the four privates from the Royal Pioneer Corps and the Royal Army Ordnance Corps who died at Catterick Bridge railway station in an explosion on 4 February 1944
- Date: 4 February 1944
- Time: 3:50–4:00 pm
- Location: Catterick Bridge railway station, North Yorkshire, England; 54.391750°N 1.653452°W
- Type: Explosion
- Cause: Most likely the incorrect loading of explosives
- Deaths: 12
- Injuries: 102

The Catterick Bridge Explosion occurred on 4 February 1944 in the railway sidings at Catterick Bridge station, on the Richmond Branch Line/Catterick Camp Railway in North Yorkshire, England. It killed twelve people and injured more than a hundred. The incorrect loading of explosives into railway wagons is believed to have been the cause, but because of wartime restrictions, reporting of the event was not as widespread as it would have been had the explosion occurred in peacetime.

== History ==
Just before 4:00 pm on 4 February 1944, a large explosion rocked the goods yard in Catterick Bridge railway station. Soldiers had been engaged in loading wagons with explosives which would have eventually been used in the D-Day effort. Speculation has been rife since about what caused the explosion with incorrect handling of the ammunition suggested. One witness recalled seeing the troops days before the explosion handling the ammunition carefully, with two men to a box. On the day of the explosion, the same witness observed the troops loading the ammunition only this time "they were practically throwing them" into the rail wagons. It was also put forward that a primed grenade was accidentally loaded in the consist, but the official inquiry apportioned no blame and listed all twelve deaths as accidental. Among those who died were the stationmaster of Catterick Bridge railway station and two female clerks from the goods office.

The explosion also caused significant damage to nearby buildings with the railway hotel being destroyed. The hotel was later raided for the beers in its cellars and its licence to sell alcohol only expired in 1984 as no-one bothered to have it rescinded. The site of the hotel is now the northwest corner of the Brompton-on-Swale traffic lights at the junction of the A6055 and the B6271. A taxi driver ran up the railway line waving a makeshift flag to warn an incoming train about the damage; the station was quite crowded with service personnel who were going on weekend leave, and trains were quite frequent on Friday afternoons.

A Military Court of Inquiry was convened to report on the disaster. The four army privates, (three of whom were from the Royal Pioneer Corps, with the fourth from the Royal Army Ordnance Corps) were loading the ammunition at the time of the explosion and were described as being "at the epicentre of the blast". What remains of their bodies are buried in four graves in the churchyard of St Mary's Church, Hornby, which is 5 miles (8 km) to the south-west. Initially, due to their proximity to the centre of the explosion, their remains were not found, and three days later the Northern Despatch newspaper still listed them as being among the missing. Killed were listed as one Royal Air Force, one Military, three railway staff, three civilian and two unidentified.

A lorry driver who was in a hut over 30 feet (9.1 m) away, was blown off his feet and wounded. Despite his own injuries, he helped to rescue other people and carried on with the rescue parties despite knowing that there was a great amount of unexploded ordnance in the vicinity. He was later awarded the Edward Medal by King George VI which was gazetted in June 1944. The medal is now in the possession of Richmond Council.

An inquest was held on the Saturday following (5 February 1944) on the eight identified dead casualties and a British Army report into the disaster was also convened, but due to wartime restrictions, its findings were not released to the inquiry or to the public at that time. Various theories had been suggested, such as sabotage by Italian prisoners of war, and a bitumen furnace that spilled out hot coke from its chimney which was located close to the blast. Writers in later years have commented that the most likely chain of events is that one of the grenades was primed, and the rough handling by the soldiers caused an explosion.

Some of the dead are commemorated on the war memorial in Brompton-on-Swale, near to where the station at Catterick Bridge was located.
