= Spurn Point military railway =

Disused railway in East Yorkshire, England

Coordinates: 53.602°N 0.146°E

Spurn Point Military Railway
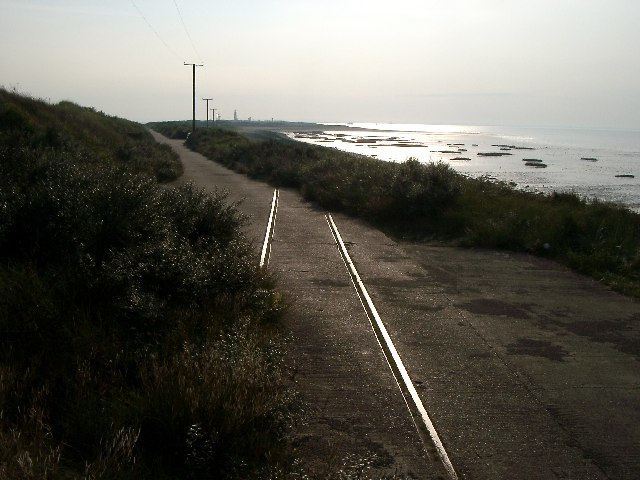
- The course of the old trackbed looking south.

Overview
- Locale: Holderness
- Dates of operation: 1915–1951

Technical
- Track gauge: 4 ft 8 1/2 in (1,435 mm) standard gauge
- Length: 3 3/4 miles (6 km)

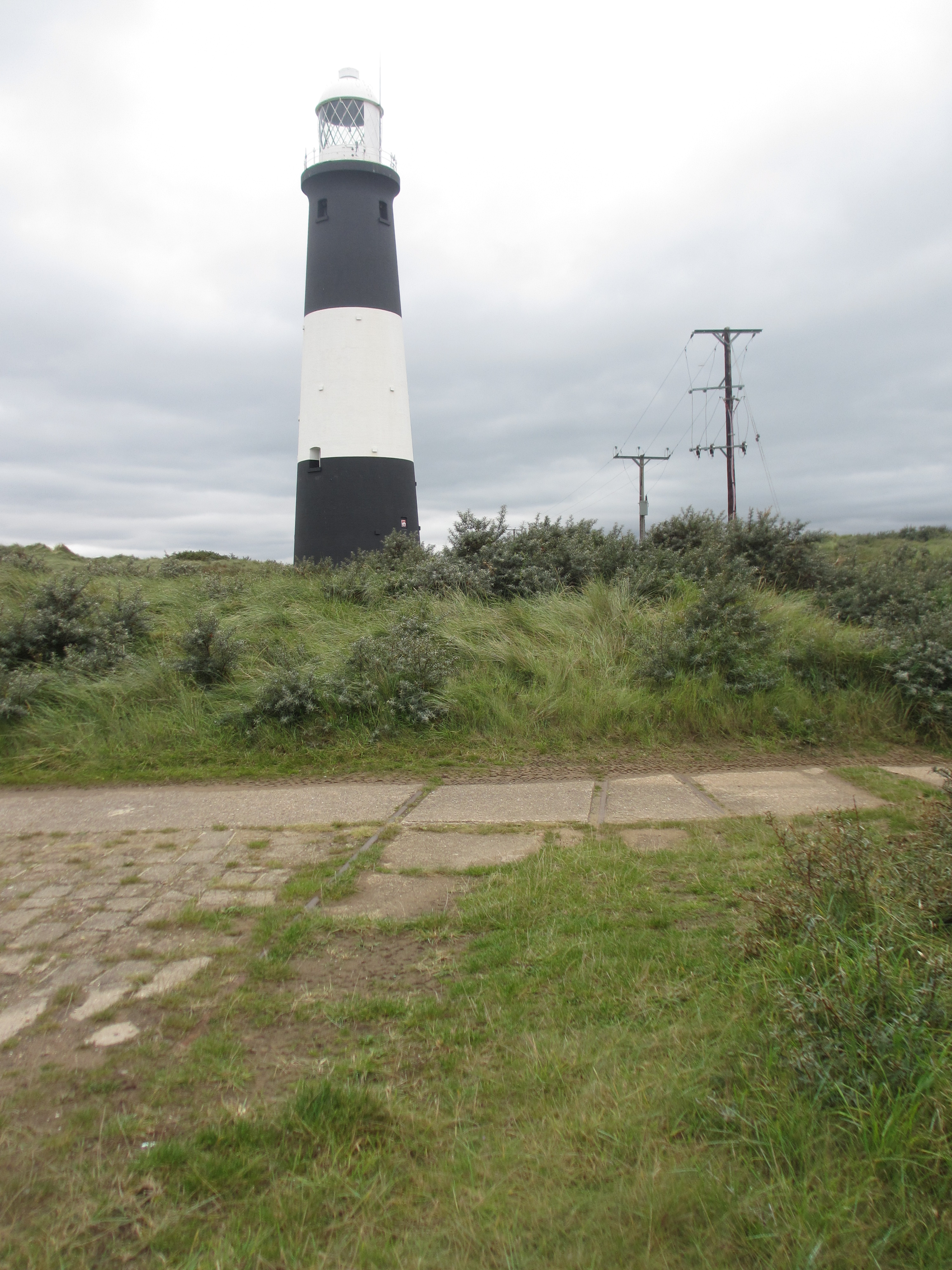
Spurn Head railway track embedded in concrete near the lighthouse in 2017, 66 years after closure

The Spurn Point military railway (Note: Widely known as the Spurn Head Railway and occasionally the Spurn to Kilnsea Railway. As its construction was authorised and funded by the War Department and its traffic was military related, the title of Spurn Point Military Railway has been retained.) was a railway line in the East Riding of Yorkshire, England. It extended for 3 3/4 miles (6 km), connecting Kilnsea with Spurn Point in the Humber Estuary. The line was built to supply military installations along this stretch of coast.

Spurn Point is a narrow spit of land which protrudes south and south-westwards from the eastern edge of Yorkshire into the Humber Estuary. It is shifting and unstable, being mostly composed of sand and shingle.

== Opening and operation ==
Spurn Point had been militarised in 1805 during the Napoleonic Wars. When the First World War was declared, the number of military personnel on Spurn Point increased greatly overnight. (Note: The BBC reference mentions that the track was narrow gauge; every other source, including several books, maintain that the railway was standard gauge. The photo in the infobox of the leftover line seems to reflect this, as do the photographs of an unmodified LNER Y8 0-4-0T locomotive No 559 being transferred to the line in 1940.) The War Department decided that a railway line between Kilnsea and Spurn Point would be the best option for a supply chain and so purchased the land from the local land-owning family.

The line was constructed by C. J. Wills and Company with rails and other secondhand materials from the Great Central and Manchester, Sheffield and Lincolnshire Railways. The contractors also brought five standard gauge steam locomotives (tank engines) to help build the line, one of which was left behind after to work the line. It opened in 1915 with the rails extending onto the jetty at Spurn Point. Transhipment of goods and materials from boats would then supply the fortifications and batteries along the stretch of railway up to Kilnsea. Rail transport was chosen as the roads in the area were narrow and twisting and supplies could be easily delivered by boat to the jetty. Whilst the jetty was only constructed to serve the railway building efforts, when the contractors left the War Department took over that too and left it in-situ.

Most trains were operated by small locomotives but some diesel and petrol railcars were used too, especially after the only resident locomotive (Kenyon - a Vulcan Foundry built engine) was scrapped in 1929. Local people who lived on the point used windpower to 'sail' small home made bogie wagons up and down the railway, with some notable crashes off the rails and into trains coming the other way. The railway was also home to an adapted Itala racing car with flanged wheels that was capable of going at 60 miles (97 km) per hour. The line on occasion transported guns, with at least one incident where the train broke down at the narrowest point and the train was buffeted by the Humber on one side and the North Sea on the other.

The railway was isolated from the rest of the mainland railway network and was not furnished with stations. The line had a two-track engine shed a short distance north of the lighthouse.

== Closure ==
The line closed in 1951 as a post-war time economy, being replaced by a road, which ironically was built with materials brought in by the railway. Spurn Head was also demilitarised in stages between 1956 and 1959, though many Cold War features were still extant further up the coast.

Apart from some small sections of rails sunk into tarmac and concrete, very little is left to show that this railway existed. The road sections with rails embedded in them get misaligned with the storms that batter the headland. This is what makes the remains of the railway look as if it is heading straight into the water.

Materials from the former road in the washover area, military and residential buildings and the railway are placed across parts of Spurn Head. These are used to reinforce parts around the washover section.

== See also ==
- Catterick Military Railway

== Citations ==
=== References ===
- Mason, P.G. (1990). Lost Railways of East Yorkshire. Driffield: Wold Publications. ISBN 0-9518832-1-6.
- Scott-Morgan, John (1980). British Independent Light Railways. Newton Abbot: David and Charles. ISBN 978-0-7153-7933-2.
