= Dalton-on-Tees =

Village and civil parish in North Yorkshire, England

Coordinates: 54.46684°N 1.5437°W

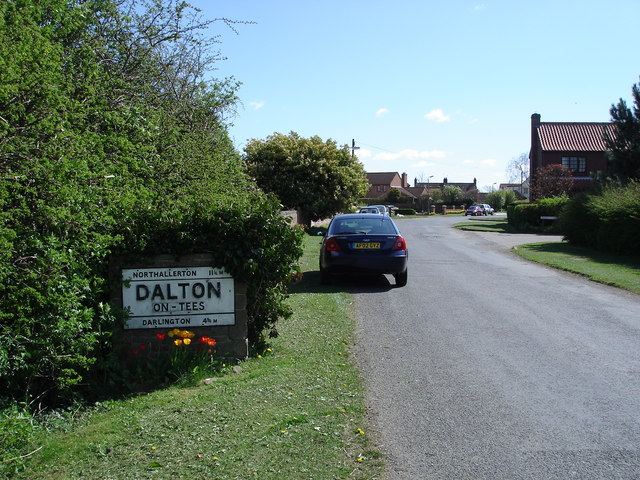
- Dalton-on-Tees

- Location within North Yorkshire
- Population: 303 (2011 Census)
- OS grid reference: NZ296080
- Unitary authority: North Yorkshire
- Ceremonial county: North Yorkshire
- Region: Yorkshire and the Humber
- Country: England
- Sovereign state: United Kingdom
- Post town: DARLINGTON
- Postcode district: DL2
- Police: North Yorkshire
- Fire: North Yorkshire
- Ambulance: Yorkshire

Dalton-on-Tees is a village and civil parish in North Yorkshire, England, near the boundary with County Durham. According to the 2001 Census there were 318 people living in the parish (including Eryholme) in 120 houses. The population had decreased to 303 by the time of the 2011 Census.

The village is bypassed by the A167 road between Darlington and Northallerton and is 1 1/2 miles (2.4 km) south of the village of Croft-on-Tees and 1 mile (1.6 km) north-east of the motor racing circuit Croft Circuit. There are signs at both the north and south entrances to the village indicating that the village is 11 1/4 miles (18.1 km) from Northallerton and 4 3/4 miles (7.6 km) from Darlington even though they are 1/4 mile (0.4 km) apart. To the east the village overlooks a meander of the River Tees, from which it derives its name: the town (tun) in the valley (or dæl [dale]).

From 1974 to 2023 it was part of the district of Richmondshire, it is now administered by the unitary North Yorkshire Council.

The village has a pub, the Chequers Inn, overlooking the village green, and a small village hall on the other side of the bypass just along West Lane. The village green is the site of the village pump (now defunct) which stands under a sprawling chestnut tree. There are a number of signed streets in the village, namely, Ruskin Close, Byron Court, Garth Terrace, Orchard Close and West Lane, and a number of unsigned roads and lanes, including The Green and the Old Road. The parish had 133 properties at the 2011 Census but new estates have been built in the village since then.

Dalton-on-Tees is served by the number 72 public bus between Darlington and Northallerton and on school days the number 466R between Croft-on-Tees and Richmond School.

The village has a series of moats, identified as a fishpond complex dating back to Medieval times.

== History ==
Dalton on Tees, at one time described as a township, lies in the Parish of Croft, was referred to in various publications in the early 1820s and appears in the 1861 census. Around 1890 it consisted of some 40 dwellings and had a population of 187. At that time it consisted of 1,625 acres (658 ha) of land and 11 acres (4.5 ha) of water and had a rateable value of £5,739. Until around 1900 it was part of the wapentake of Gilling East in the Richmond area of the North Riding of Yorkshire. It is near the former Dalton junction/Eryholme railway station on the closed Richmond branch line of the North Eastern Railway between York and Newcastle.

At the southern end of the village is a memorial to the pilots, air and ground crew of the Royal Canadian Air Force (RCAF) 434 "Bluenose" and 431 "Iroquois" Squadrons who, during World War II, were based at the nearby RAF Croft air base (now the site of the Croft Circuit as described above).

Some years ago a Romano-British villa complex was unearthed and explored in the fields near Chapel House Farm on the edge of the village.

During 2018, as part of a Community Archaeology project under the Tees Valley Landscape Partnership, a Roman fort or camp was discovered near Dalton-on-Tees. The project discovered two camps or forts. The first, of 6ha west of the village, is believed to date from 70AD and is thought to be associated with the Roman conquest of Northern England. It was followed some 30 years later by a much larger fort of 16ha, which included part of the earlier camp or fort. The defences of this larger fort consisted of a box-rampart, consisting of vertical timber revetments to the front and rear linked by cross members. The resulting interior space was filled with earth, clay and rubble. A walkway and parapet topped the timber defence. This later fort is approaching the size of a legionary fortress and could have accommodated a force of 4,000 men. The village of Dalton-on-Tees is constructed largely within this later Roman fort.
