= Moulton railway station (North Yorkshire) =

Disused railway station in North Yorkshire, England

Moulton
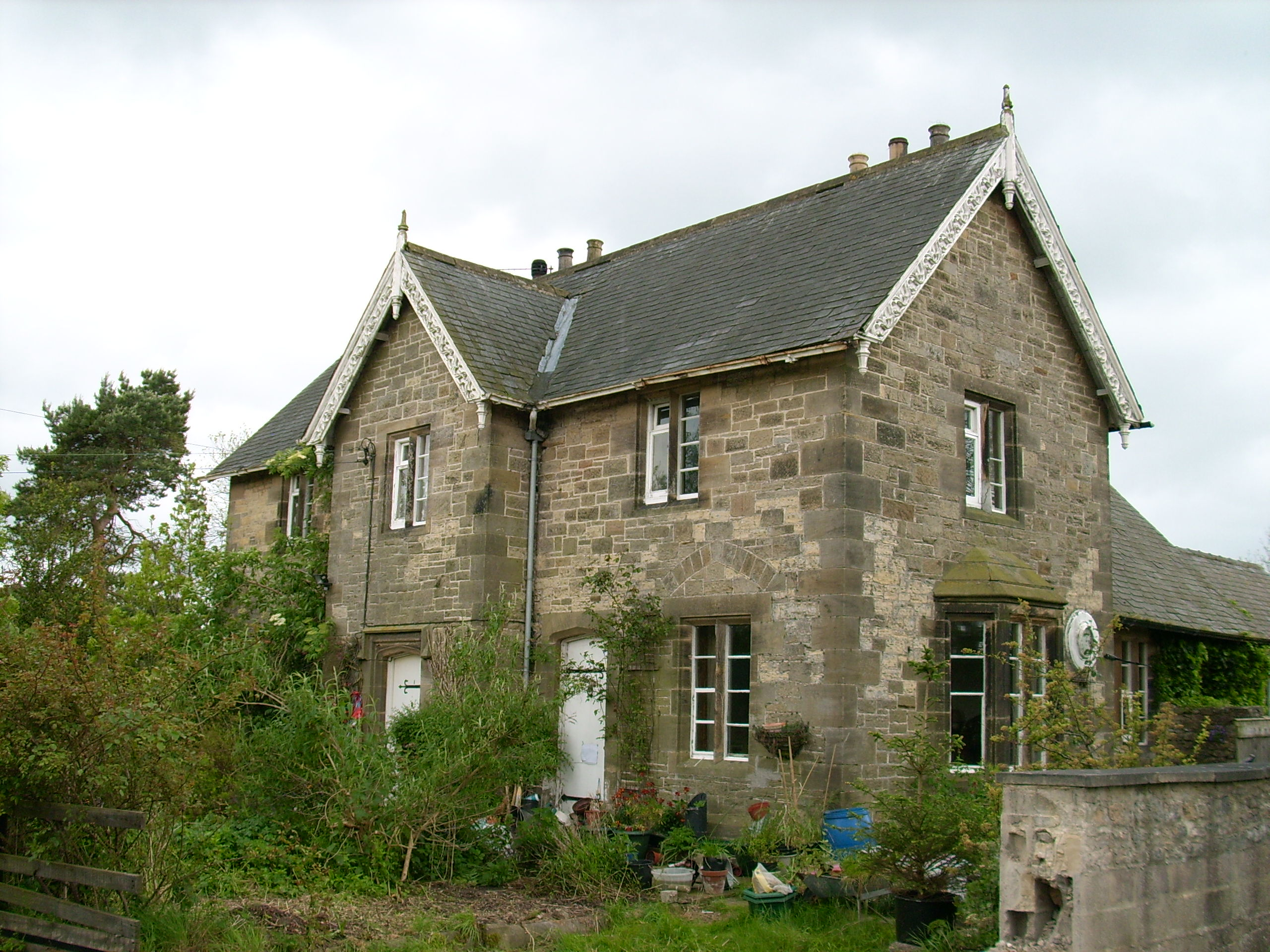
- Moulton station house

General information
- Location: North Cowton, North Yorkshire; England
- Coordinates: 54.430400°N 1.579000°W
- Grid reference: NZ273039
- Platforms: 2

Other information
- Status: Disused

History
- Original company: York and Newcastle Railway
- Pre-grouping: North Eastern Railway
- Post-grouping: London and North Eastern Railway

Key dates
- 10 September 1846: opened
- 3 March 1969: closed
Location

Moulton railway station was a railway station in North Yorkshire, England. It was situated near the village of North Cowton.

Moulton was the Eryholme-Richmond branch line which was opened in 1846 by the York and Newcastle Railway Company. The line was closed for passengers in 1969 and completely a year later.

Despite being only about one-quarter mile (0.40 km) from North Cowton the station was named after the village of Moulton some 3 miles (4.8 km) away. This was to avoid confusion with a now disused station on the East Coast Main Line named Cowton serving the nearby village of East Cowton.

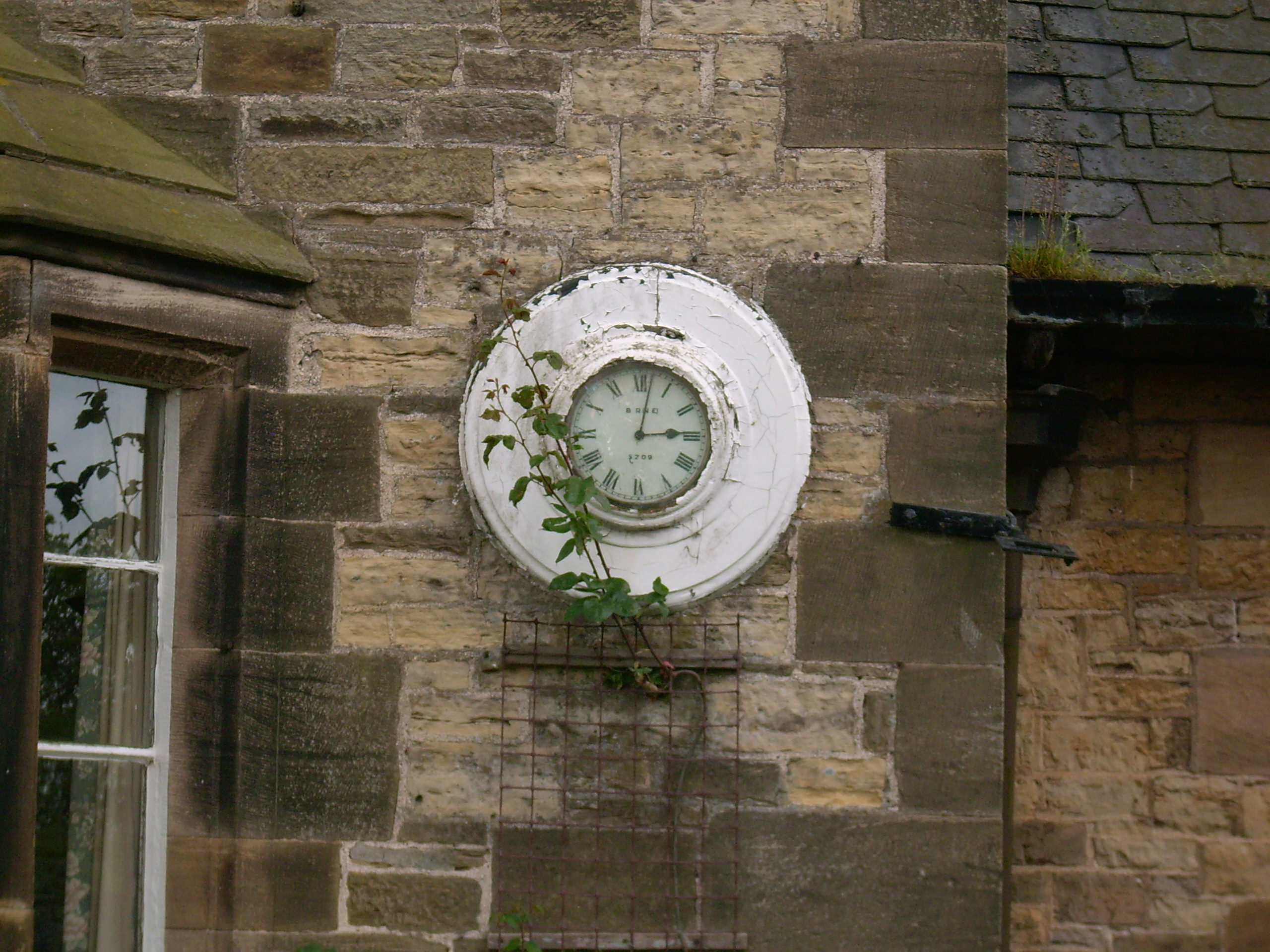
Moulton station clock

Moulton station house still survives, it is now used as a residential property, but the platform clock can still be seen on the wall.

The Richmond bound platform now forms part of the boundary wall to station house. The Darlington-bound platform still stands intact, though it is heavily overgrown with trees, bushes and bramble thickets.

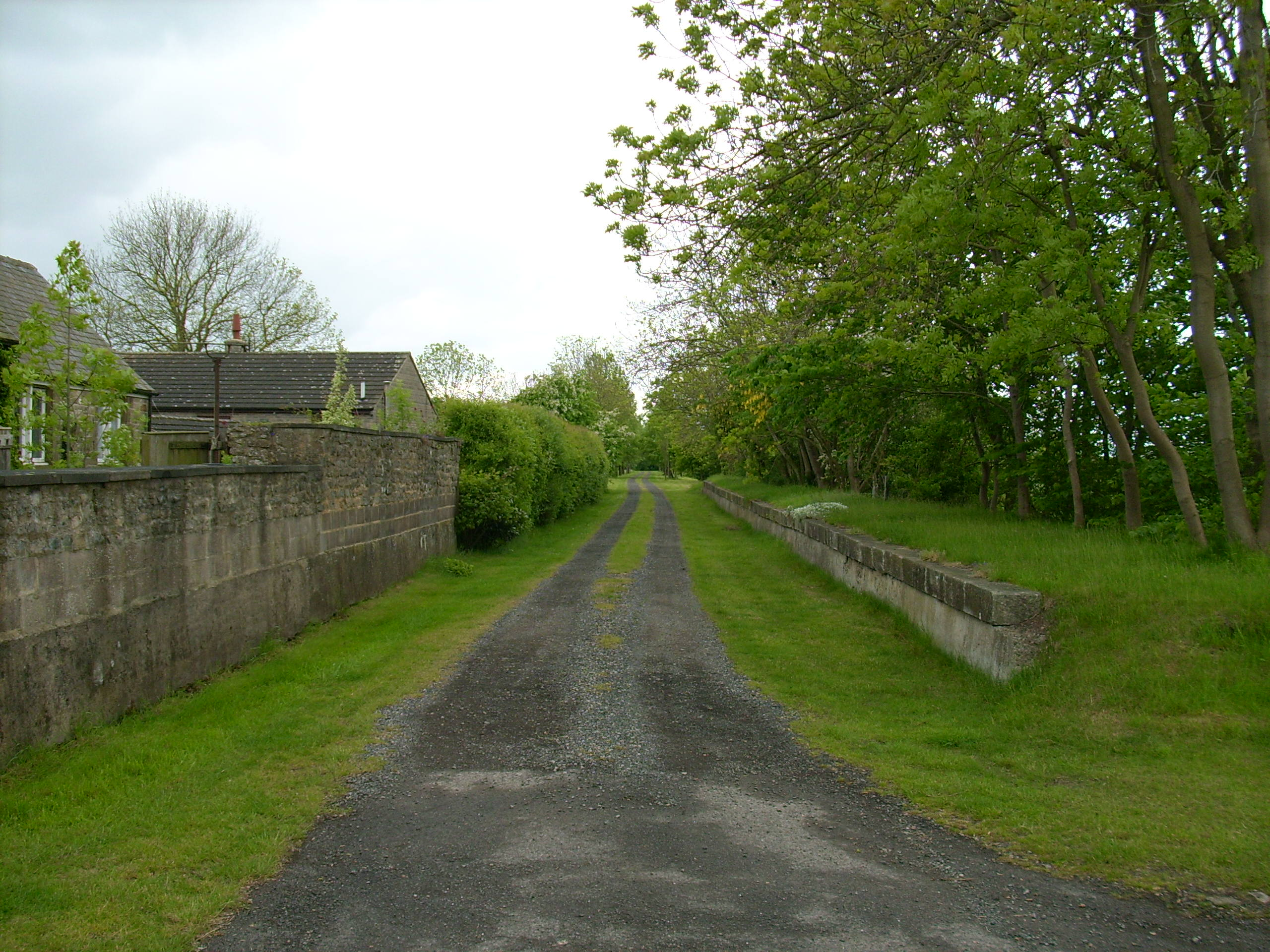
The trackbed and platform, looking towards Scorton

The track bed is now used as an access road for a nearby smallholding, it is not officially recognised as a public right-of-way, though it has been used as a scenic footpath by local people for over 20 years.

== See also ==
- List of closed railway lines in Great Britain
- List of closed railway stations in Britain

Preceding station	Disused railways	Following station
Eryholme	Eryholme-Richmond branch line	Scorton
