= Atley Hill =

Hamlet in North Yorkshire, England

Coordinates: 54.41628°N 1.55857°W

- Location within North Yorkshire
- OS grid reference: NZ287024
- Unitary authority: North Yorkshire
- Ceremonial county: North Yorkshire
- Region: Yorkshire and the Humber
- Country: England
- Sovereign state: United Kingdom
- Police: North Yorkshire
- Fire: North Yorkshire
- Ambulance: Yorkshire

Atley Hill is a hamlet in the county of North Yorkshire, England. It is situated on the B1263 road between the A167 and the village of Scorton.

From 1974 to 2023, it was part of the Hambleton District, it is now administered by the unitary North Yorkshire Council.

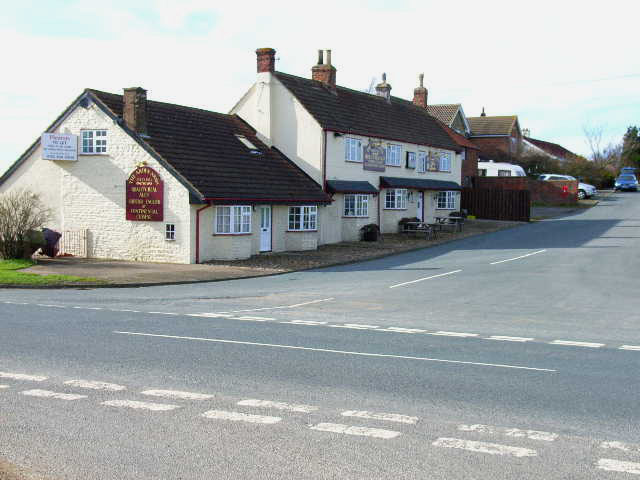
The Arden Arms

There is a pub called The Arden Arms, it has closed and reopened several times in the 21st century, the main reasons for the closures being the drink driving laws, lack of rural public transport and the general decline of the rural economy. The pub last closed in 2022, and in 2025, an application was made to turn the pub buildings into private dwellings.

Situated on Atley Hill above the current settlement was the (abandoned) Medieval village of Atley Cowton. Historically, the hamlet was in the wapentake of Gilling West and is 9 miles (14 km) from Richmond, and 8 miles (13 km) from Northallerton. The settlement was first recorded in 1157 as Atlou, and derives from an Old English personal name (Ætla) meaning Atla's Hill.
