= Eryholme railway station =

Disused railway station in North Yorkshire, England

Eryholme

General information
- Location: North Yorkshire; England
- Coordinates: 54.449121°N 1.534181°W
- Grid reference: NZ303060
- Platforms: 4

Other information
- Status: Disused

History
- Original company: York and Newcastle Railway
- Pre-grouping: North Eastern Railway
- Post-grouping: London and North Eastern Railway

Key dates
- 10 September 1846: Station opened as Dalton Junction
- 1 May 1901: Station renamed Eryholme
- 1 October 1911: Station closed to regular traffic
- After 1920: Station closed completely
- c.1944: Reopened for staff and military use.
- 1969: Station closed
Location

Eryholme railway station, originally named as Dalton Junction until May 1901, was a railway station located on the East Coast Main Line between Northallerton and Darlington in North Yorkshire, England. It was the point at which the now closed Eryholme-Richmond line diverged from the East Coast Main Line.

== History ==
The station opened 10 September 1846 as Dalton Junction, and was renamed to Eryholme (sometimes Eryholme Junction) in May 1901. It closed to regular passenger services in October 1911, though services continued to call unadvertised at the station for the railway families that live at Eryholme. Although there is no evidence that the station forwarded or received any goods in the 1960s, it officially closed to goods traffic in June 1964. One non-passenger revenue service was the sidings for the Darlington Rolling Stock Company which provided wagon maintenance.

The junction was 2 1/4 miles (3.6 km) south of Croft Spa railway station, 2 miles (3.2 km) north of Cowton railway station (both on the ECML), and 2 miles 24 chains (3.7 km) north-east of Moulton station on the Eryholme to Richmond line. When it was still open to passengers, the station had four platforms; two on the main line and two on the branch, with the down platform of the main line merging into the Richmond-bound platform on the branch. Connecting the main platforms was a footbridge, but passengers alighting from Darlington-bound trains from Richmond, had to cross the tracks at the level.

The locality was sparsely populated, there being no road access to the station, and Eryholme's existence was solely to allow passengers to transfer between trains on the Richmond line with those on the main line between Darlington and York. Originally, services on the branch connected with Eryholme only and passengers transferred between trains at the junction station. When the station closed in 1911, Croft Spa was used as the interchange station, but before the LNER assumed control in 1923, trains started running through to Darlington.

The station probably saw its greatest number of passengers during World War II as it was the drop off point for servicemen arriving at the nearby RAF Croft. After the war it was also used by railwaymen living in nearby cottages for which trains stopped there but were not advertised in the timetables. This arrangement continued until 1969 when services on the Richmond Branch were withdrawn. Passing the site today passengers on the East Coast Main Line would be hard pressed to pinpoint the location of Eryholme, as apart from some remains of the branch platforms, all signs of the station have been demolished.

== See also ==
- List of closed railway lines in Great Britain
- List of closed railway stations in Britain

| Preceding station | Historical railways | Following station |
|---|---|---|
| Cowton; Line open, station closed | North Eastern Railway; East Coast Main Line | Croft Spa; Line open, station closed |
| Moulton; Line and station closed | North Eastern Railway; Eryholme–Richmond line | Terminus |
