= Eryholme–Richmond line =

Former railway line in Yorkshire, England

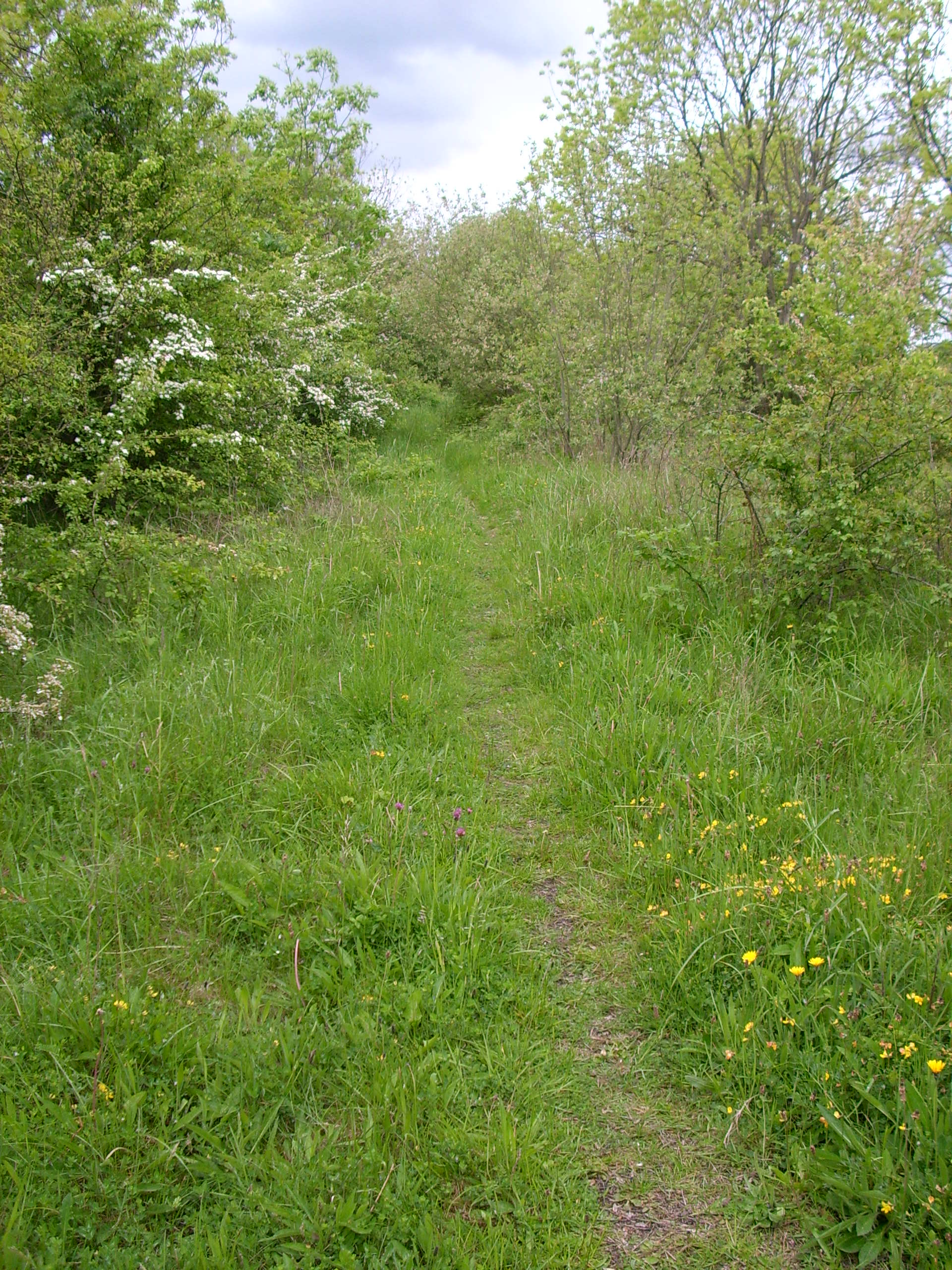
- Nature taking over the trackbed between Moulton End and Scorton, May 2007

Overview
- Status: Closed
- Locale: North Yorkshire
- Termini: Eryholme railway station; Richmond railway station

Service
- Type: Heavy rail
- Operator(s): York and Newcastle Railway to 1854, North Eastern Railway 1854–1923, London and North Eastern Railway 1923–1948, British Railways (N.E region) 1948 to closure

History
- Opened: 10 September 1846
- Closed: 3 March 1969 (to passengers) 1970 for goods

Technical
- Line length: 9 miles 62 chains
- Number of tracks: Double
- Track gauge: 4 ft 8 1/2 in (1,435 mm) standard gauge

The Eryholme–Richmond branch line was opened in 1846 by the York and Newcastle Railway Company. The original section of the line ran from between a point in between Darlington and Northallerton on what is now the East Coast Main Line and the terminus at Richmond railway station.

== History ==
A proposal for the branch was first mooted in 1825 and in 1836, the idea of serving Swaledale was again raised when notifications were placed in the local newspapers for the Richmond and Cleveland Railway. The branch was formally opened on the 10 September 1846 and ran from what was known originally as Dalton Junction, with the NER renaming the junction Eryholme in 1901, despite Eryholme being further away from there than Dalton was.

The railway was intended to progress further up the valley to Reeth with a view to moving quarried products out of the dale. The proposal even gained parliamentary approval in 1869, but due to local support not being forthcoming, the NER never even started the venture. This venture was revisited in 1912 with the Swaledale Light Railway Order 1914 being granted for the Swaledale Light Railway Company, but again this faltered and was never constructed.

When trains arrived at the Richmond terminus, the procedure was to allow the passengers to alight from the train and the loco would propel the carriages out of the station and run-round the train as there was no loco release facility. When troop trains were operating, a loco would be outbased at Richmond to attach to the rear of a terminating service. This would facilitate a quick turnaround time for departure and the incoming loco could then wait in the sidings to repeat the changeover with the next terminating service. Despite the existence of the Catterick branch, most troop trains would run into Richmond and servicemen and women would be bussed into the camp.

== Catterick Camp Military Railway ==
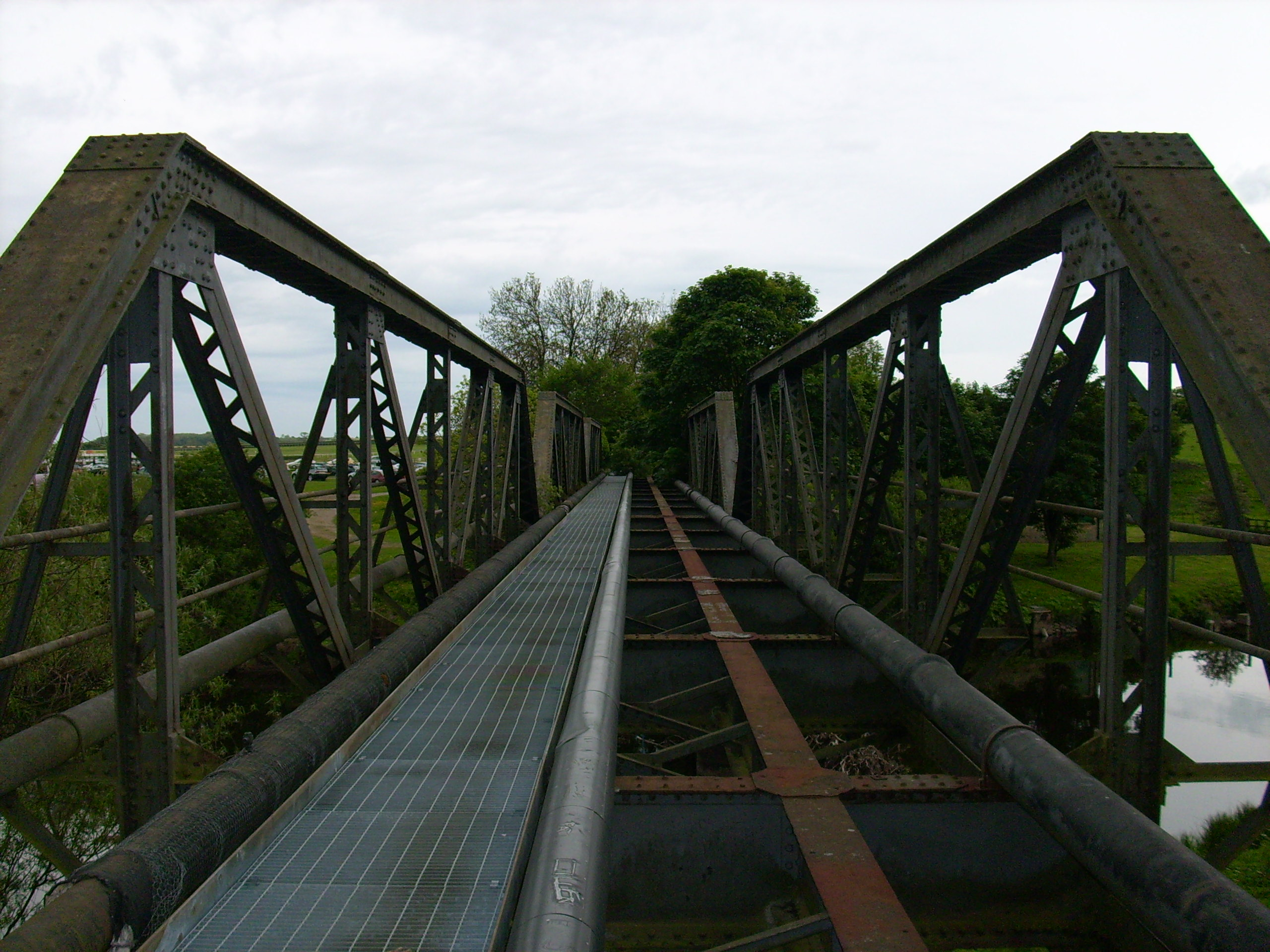
Catterick railway bridge

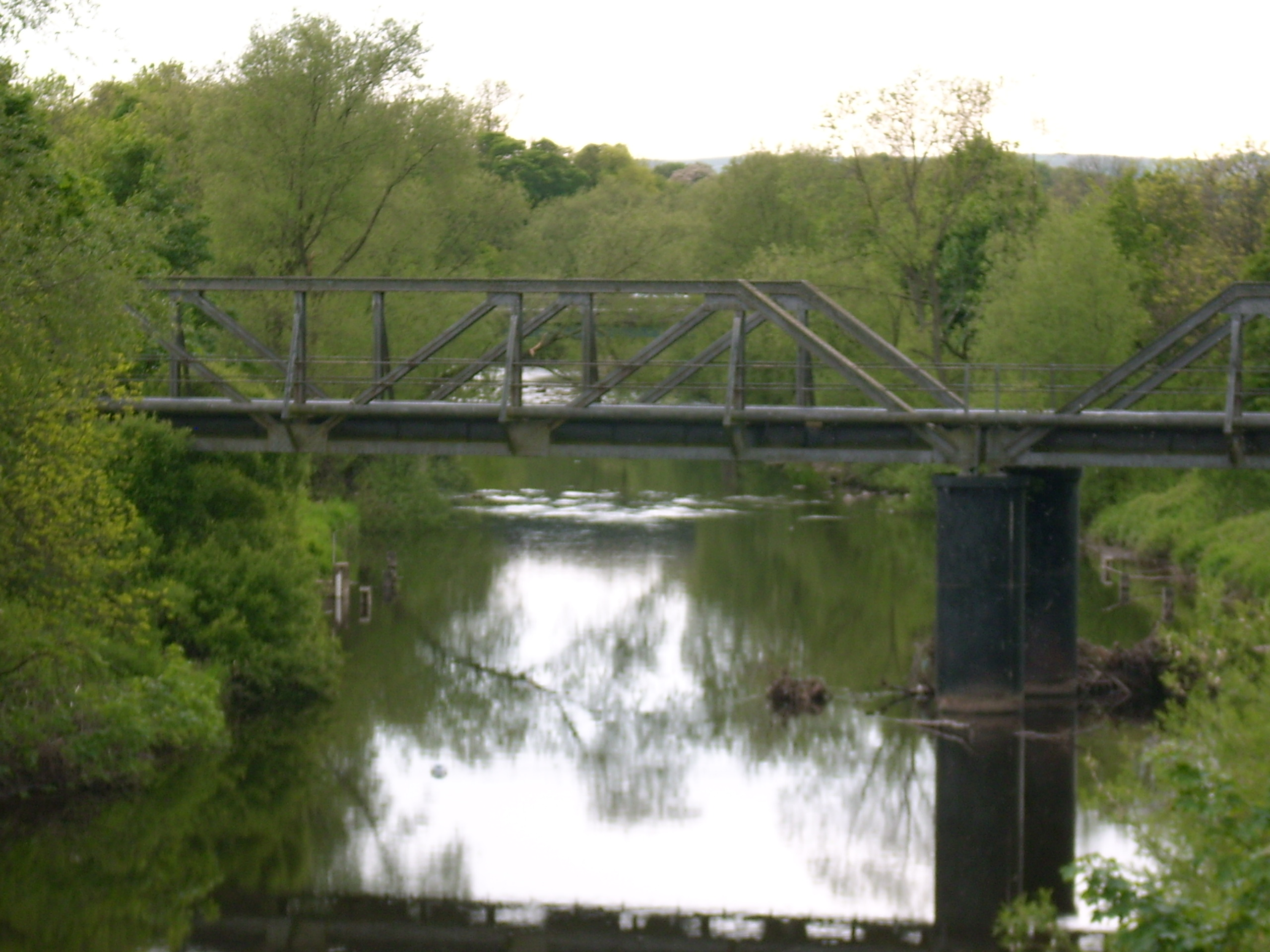
Catterick railway bridge as seen from the road bridge

The start of the First World War saw the hasty construction of a sub branch line to Catterick Camp (now Catterick Garrison) which opened in 1915. The sub branch separated near Brompton-on-Swale crossing the River Swale via Catterick Bridge, then from 1922 was diverted onto the new Catterick Railway Bridge, which still stands. The branch then served the Catterick Garrison. The branch and all its stations were closed on 26 October 1964.

== Closure ==
The line and its sub branch survived the Beeching cuts of the early 1960s largely thanks to extensive use by the military. The North Eastern region of British Railways gave notice to close the line in 1963, but the Ministry of Transport refused permission. The line between Richmond and Catterick Bridge was singled as an economy measure, but this was not enough as the line only survived a few years before succumbing to closure to passengers in 1969. Freight carried on to Catterick Bridge until 1970.

The bridge that carried the Catterick railway over the A1 at Brompton-on-Swale was purchased by the Wensleydale Railway in 2015. The bridge needed to be removed due to the A1 being upgraded to A1(M) status, which involved widening the road. The redundant Fort bridge (as it is known) will be used to enable the railway to span Apedale Beck west of Redmire railway station.

== See also ==
- List of closed railway lines in Great Britain
- List of closed railway stations in Britain
