= Cowton =

Cowton may refer to:

== People ==
- Gary Cowton (born 1952), former Australian rules footballer
- Robert Cowton, Franciscan theologian active at the University of Oxford in the fourteenth century

== Places ==
Three villages and civil parishes in the district of Hambleton in Richmondshire, North Yorkshire, England

- East Cowton
- North Cowton
- South Cowton

== See also ==
- Cowton Burn, stream that rises in the Grampian Mountains, west of Netherley, Aberdeenshire, Scotland
- Cowton railway station, disused station on the East Coast Main Line, near the village of East Cowton
- North and South Cowton Community Primary School, located in North Cowton
- South Cowton Castle, 15th Century fortified dwelling house in South Cowton
