= Danby Wiske =

Village in North Yorkshire, England

Coordinates: 54°22′54″N 1°28′59″W

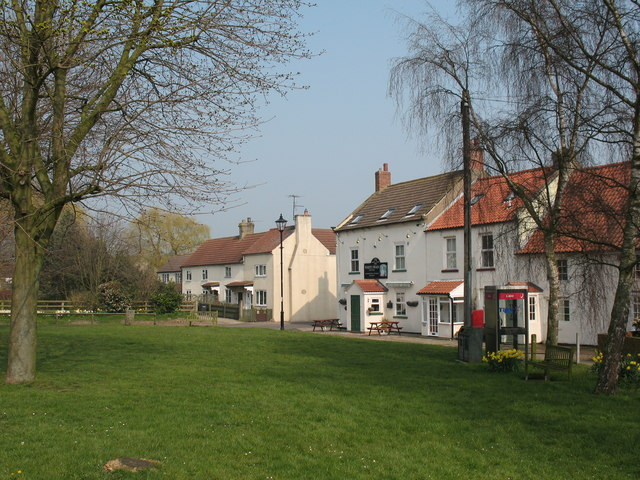
- Village Green at Danby Wiske

- Location within North Yorkshire
- Population: 366 (Includes Hutton Bonville. 2011 census)
- OS grid reference: SE336985
- Civil parish: Danby Wiske with Lazenby
- Unitary authority: North Yorkshire
- Ceremonial county: North Yorkshire
- Region: Yorkshire and the Humber
- Country: England
- Sovereign state: United Kingdom
- Post town: NORTHALLERTON
- Postcode district: DL7 0
- Dialling code: 01609
- Police: North Yorkshire
- Fire: North Yorkshire
- Ambulance: Yorkshire
- UK Parliament: Richmond and Northallerton

Danby Wiske is a village and the main settlement in the civil parish of Danby Wiske with Lazenby, in North Yorkshire, England. The village lies 3.7 miles (6 km) north north-west of the county town of Northallerton.

== History ==
Danby Wiske was mentioned in the Domesday Book as Danebi. The lands were the property of Kofse at the time of the Norman Conquest. After 1086 the manor was granted to Landric of Hornby. There were three households, five ploughlands and six acres of meadow. During the late 13th century and early 14th century, the manor was the subject of dispute. Originally it had passed to the lords of Richmond, who had granted hereditary lordship to Geoffrey le Scrope. When his son Henry inherited the manor the Crown took the title for a short time until it was returned to Henry. However the Crown retook possession upon learning the conditions of inheritance and granted it back to the lords of Richmond in 1342. The manor was leased to Robert Dawe and Edward Thurland in 1602, but in 1616 King James I granted the manor of Danby Wiske to George Calvert, Lord Baltimore, founder of the state of Maryland in the United States. The Calverts sold the manor in 1701 after which it changed hands a couple of times until in 1718 it was bought by Sir Hugh Smithson. It was sold to Jonathon Wharton in 1765. By 1857, the manor was in the possession of the Venerable Archdeacon Cust.

Danby Wiske is around ¼ mile from the East Coast Main Line; there was once a railway station here, but this has long since closed. The ancient parish of Danby Wiske included Yafforth as well as Streetlam, but not Lazenby. Yafforth became a separate civil parish in 1866.

The etymology of the name derives from the Old Norse words Danir and by meaning the farm of the Danes. The suffix of Wiske refers to the nearby river.

Lazenby had a separate history until modern times. It was historically an extra parochial area. It became a separate civil parish in 1858, and was joined to the ecclesiastical parish of Northallerton in 1867. The 17th-century Lazenby Hall is a grade II* listed building.

== Geography and governance ==
The village lies on a minor road between the village of Streetlam and the A167 near Northallerton. There is a crossroads in the centre of the village, with another minor road leading to the nearby village of Yafforth. The village lies at an elevation between 120 feet (37 m) and 141 feet (43 m) The remains of a moated site south of the church is designated an Ancient Scheduled monument. It is approximately 2 hectares (4.9 acres) in size with several distinct raised features including evidence that a channel existed between the site and the River Wiske.

Danby Wiske is the lowest point on the 192-mile (309 km) Coast to Coast Walk, originated and described by Alfred Wainwright. The parish of Danby Wiske with Lazenby includes the village of Streetlam about 2 miles west of Danby Wiske. Lazenby consists of a few scattered houses east of Danby Wiske.

The village lies within the UK Parliamentary constituency of Richmond and Northallerton. From 1974 to 2023 it was part of the Hambleton District, it is now administered by the unitary North Yorkshire Council. There are five members of the local Parish Council.

In 1971 the parish had a population of 199. On 1 April 2003 the parish was abolished and merged with Lazenby to form "Danby Wiske with Lazenby".

== Demography ==
Population
Year	1801	1811	1821	1831	1841	1851	1881	1891	1901	1911	1921	1931	1951	1961	2001	2011
Total	427	402	477	508	546	554	287	302	277	300	297	290	259	225	378	366

=== 2001 Census ===
According to the 2001 UK Census, the parish was 47.9% male and 52.1% female of the total population of 378. The religious make-up was 83.9% Christian with the rest stating no religion. The ethnic distribution was 100% White There were 157 dwellings.

=== 2011 Census ===
According to the 2011 UK Census, the parish had a total population of 366 with 48.4% male and 51.6% female. The religious make-up was 72.7% Christian, a small Buddhist minority with the rest stating no religion. The ethnic distribution was 99.5% White with a small Black British minority. There were 155 dwellings.

== Community ==
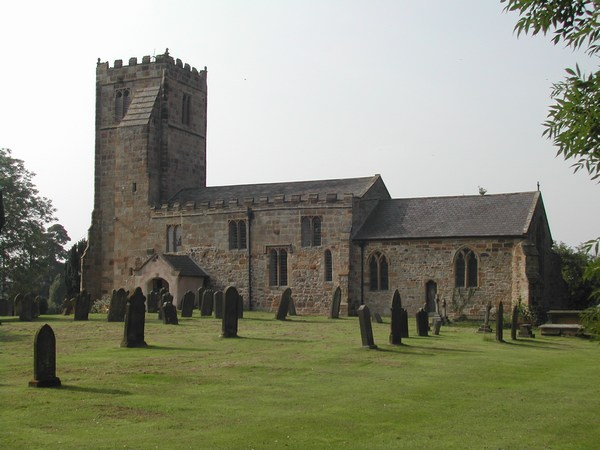
Village Church, Danby Wiske

There is a Village Hall, built in 1978 and extended in 2010, which is used for fundraising, community activities and social functions. The village once had a school but this too closed long ago; the village children now attend schools in Northallerton or surrounding villages such as East Cowton and Great Smeaton. There is a Post Box with daily 4 p.m. weekday collections. There is a children's play park, opened in June 2018, with the field behind, owned by the village committee, being opened in 2019. There is a 17th-century public house, The White Swan, in the village.

== Religion ==
Danby Wiske Church is undedicated and is a Grade I Listed Building. The doorway and font in the nave both date from Norman times. The church tower underwent a small restoration programme in early 2010.

== Notable residents ==
- George Calvert, lord of Danby Wiske Manor from 1616. Later became Lord Baltimore and founded the state of Maryland in the American Colonies.
- Thomas Meriton (b. 1637/8), playwright, was educated at the private school in the village before studying at St John's College, Cambridge.

== See also ==
- Listed buildings in Danby Wiske with Lazenby
