= Alexander Radcliffe (writer) =

English poet

Alexander Radcliffe (c. 1653 – in or before 1696) was an English poet.

== Life ==
He was probably born in the Southern Netherlands about 1653, the only son and heir of the exiled royalist Alexander Radcliffe (1633–1682), later of Hampstead, Middlesex. He was admitted at Gray's Inn on 12 November 1669. He was not called to the bar, but seems to have deserted the legal profession for the army, in which he had attained the rank of captain by 1696.

== Works ==
He was a disciple of the Earl of Rochester in verse, and, according to George Thorn-Drury, "rivalled his master in ribaldry". He published:

1. Ovid Travestie, a mock Poem on five Epistles of Ovid, 16mo, 1673. This, the first edition, was ignored when the book was reprinted, 4to, 1680, 1681, 1696 (with additions), and 1705.
2. Bacchanalia Cœlestia: a Poem, in praise of Punch, compos'd by the Gods and Goddesses in Cabal, London, 1680, fol. broadside. Reprinted in the Ramble, &c.
3. The Ramble: an anti-heroick Poem. Together with some Terrestrial Hymns and Carnal Ejaculations, London, 1682, 8vo. Part of The Ramble had previously appeared in the edition of Rochester's Poems which bears the imprint Antwerp, 1680. Nos. 1 (3rd edit.) and 3 were reissued with a general title, The Works of Capt. Alexander Radcliffe, in 1696, 2 pts. (London, 8vo).

== Bibliography ==
- Chernaik, Warren (2008). "Radcliffe, Alexander (b. c. 1653, d. in or before 1696), poet". Oxford Dictionary of National Biography (online ed.). Oxford University Press. doi:10.1093/ref:odnb/22973. (Subscription, Wikipedia Library access or UK public library membership required.)
- Foster, Joseph (1889). The Register of Admissions to Gray's Inn, 1521–1889. London: The Hansard Publishing Union, Limited. p. 307.
- Nichols, John, ed. (1780). A Select Collection of Poems: With Notes, Biographical and Historical. Vol. 1. London: J. Nichols. p. 141. ISBN 978-0-404-04750-4.
- Nichols, John, ed. (1780). A Select Collection of Poems: With Notes, Biographical and Historical. Vol. 3. London: J. Nichols. p. 163.

Attribution:

- This article incorporates text from a publication now in the public domain: Thorn-Drury, George (1896). "Radcliffe, Alexander". In Lee, Sidney (ed.). Dictionary of National Biography. Vol. 47. London: Smith, Elder & Co. p. 119.
