= George Thorn-Drury =

English barrister and literary scholar (1860–1931)

George Thorn-Drury KC (1860–1931) was an English barrister and literary scholar.

== Life ==
Thorn-Drury was born in 1860, the eldest son of George John Drury of Canterbury, an ironfounder. In 1879 he matriculated at Worcester College, Oxford, later becoming an Honorary Fellow of the college.

Having been admitted as a student to the Inner Temple in 1880, Thorn-Drury was called to the Bar in 1885. He was appointed KC in 1913 and elected Master of the Bench of the Inner Temple in 1921. Thorn-Drury held the office of Recorder of Dover from 1920 until his death.

== Literary scholarship ==
A scholar in the literature of the Caroline and Restoration periods and a specialist in minor Restoration poets, Thorn-Drury produced authoritative editions of the works of Edmund Waller (in 1893) and Thomas Randolph (in 1929) and collated several anthologies of miscellaneous verse. Under the initials 'G. T. D.' he penned entries for the Dictionary of National Biography on writers such as James Mab, Thomas Meriton, Katherine Philips, John Quarles, Thomas Mayne Reid and Henry Reynolds.

== Collections ==
Over many years of study Thorn-Drury built up a significant library of 17th- and early 18th-century literature, which after his death was auctioned at Sotheby's between 1931 and 1932.

In 1931 the Bodleian Library purchased around 70 volumes from Thorn-Drury's library, mostly late-17th-century English poetical texts as well as reference works. All of these are heavily annotated by Thorn-Drury himself, and many are grangerised and indexed. Additional material, including notes, transcripts and miscellaneous papers, were acquired in 1947 and 1952. Altogether the Bodleian's collection represents the unpublished portion of Thorn-Drury's life work and preserves a significant quantity of bibliographical information on the poetical writers of the Restoration and of earlier and slightly later periods.

Songbooks from Thorn-Drury's library were bought by Walter Harding; these in turn arrived at the Bodleian in 1975 within Harding's vast bequest to the library on his death in 1973.
