= Thomas Madox =

British historian

Thomas Madox (1666 – 13 January 1727) was a legal antiquary and historian, known for his publication and discussion of medieval records and charters; and in particular for his History of the Exchequer, tracing the administration and records of that branch of the state from the Norman Conquest to the time of Edward II. It became a standard work for the study of English medieval history. He held the office of historiographer royal from 1708 until his death.

== Life ==
Madox was born in 1666. He applied himself at an early age to the study of the common law, and was admitted to the Middle Temple, though he was never called to the bar. He became a sworn clerk in the Lord Treasurer's remembrance office (i.e. official archives), and afterwards joint clerk in the Augmentation Office, which administered the crown estates; first with Charles Batteley, who died in May 1722, and afterwards with John Batteley.

There he pursued his historical researches under the patronage of Lord Somers. He made his first appearance as an author with the publication of Formulare Anglicanum in 1702, concerning ancient charters, which Madox introduced with a learned dissertation on the subject. The principal materials for this work were obtained from the archives of the court of augmentations. It is "justly" (according to the Dictionary of National Biography) described by Bishop William Nicolson as "of unspeakable service to our students in law and antiquities". On the motion of Peter Le Neve, Madox was elected a member of the Society of Antiquaries in January 1708.

In 1711 he published his History of the Exchequer, with a dedication to the Queen and a long prefatory epistle to Lord Somers, giving an account of his researches among the public records to gather the materials for the work. Madox was subsequently sworn in and admitted to the office of historiographer royal, in succession to Thomas Rymer, on 12 July 1714, with an attached salary of £200 a year.

The last of his works Madox saw printed in his lifetime was Firma Burgi, on early records concerning English towns and boroughs, dedicated to George I, published in 1723. Madox died on 13 January 1727, and was buried at Arlesey, Bedfordshire. He was succeeded in the office of historiographer royal by Robert Stephens.

A posthumous work, Baronia Anglica, on the history and records of the feudal barons, appeared in 1736. A collection of further transcripts was bequeathed by his widow to the British Museum, as an addition to the Sloane Library. It ran to ninety-four volumes, folio and quarto, consisting chiefly of extracts of records from the Exchequer, the Patent and Close Rolls in the Tower, the Cottonian Library, the archives of Canterbury and Westminster, and the library of Corpus Christi College, Cambridge; all that Madox had transcribed himself, intending them as materials for a Feudal History of England from the earliest times.

== Personal life ==
Madox married Catharine, the daughter of Vigarus Edwards. He had no issue.

== Works ==
- Formulare Anglicanum, or a Collection of Antique Charters and Instruments of divers kinds, taken from the Originals, placed under several Heads, and deduced (in a Series according to the Order of Time) from the Norman Conquest to the End of the Reign of King Henry VIII. London, 1702, 441 pp.
- History and Antiquities of the Exchequer of the Kings of England ... from the Norman Conquest to the End of the Reign of ... Edward II, London, 1711, 752 pp. plus annexes. An index was printed in Baronia Anglica, and a second edition, in 2 vols., with the index, was published in London in 1769. (vol. 1, vol. 2)
  Appended was a copy of the Dialogue concerning the Exchequer (De Scaccario), erroneously ascribed to Gervase of Tilbury, now believed to be by Richard FitzNeal; also a Latin dissertation by Madox on the Great Roll of the Exchequer (the Pipe rolls). An English translation of these appendices, made by "a Gentleman of the Inner Temple", appeared at London in 1758.
- An account of all the gold and silver coins ever used in England: particularly of their value, fineness, and allay, and the standards of gold and silver in all the respective reigns for the last six hundred years: likewise of it's plenty and scarcity, London, 1718, 23pp.
- Firma Burgi, or an Historical Essay concerning the Cities, Towns, and Boroughs of England, taken from Records, London, 1723, and again 1726, 297 pp.
- Baronia Anglica; an History of Land-honours and Baronies, and of Tenure in capite Verified by Records, London, 1736, 292pp.; reissued in 1741.

== Notes ==
Preceded by Thomas Rymer	English Historiographer Royal; 1714–1727	Succeeded by Robert Stephens
