= Listed buildings in East Cowton =

East Cowton is a civil parish in the county of North Yorkshire, England. It contains five listed buildings that are recorded in the National Heritage List for England. All the listed buildings are designated at Grade II, the lowest of the three grades, which is applied to "buildings of national importance and special interest". The parish contains the village of East Cowton and the surrounding area. The listed buildings consist of a church, its vicarage, a war memorial, a grave slab, and a former railway station.

== Buildings ==
Name and location	Photograph	Date	Notes
Grave slab, St Mary's churchyard 54.42965°N 1.53665°W	—	14th century	The grave slab is on the site of St Mary's Church, which was demolished in about 1960. It is plain and in stone, and on the top is a relief carving of a foliate cross with leafed stems on the shaft.
The Vicarage; 54.42476°N 1.52887°W	—	Early 19th century	The vicarage is in red brick with a hipped concrete tile roof. There are two storeys and three bays. In the centre is a doorway with Doric columns, a fanlight, a frieze, a cornice and a blocking course. The windows are casements with flat brick arches.
Former Cowton railway station 54.42849°N 1.51035°W		1841	The station and stationmaster's house were designed by Benjamin Green for the Great North of England Railway. It is in plum-coloured brick with sandstone dressings and Welsh slate roof with moulded coped gables, double kneelers and finials. There is an H-shaped plan, and on the left is a projecting house. In the centre of the west front is a projecting porch with a four-centred arched opening and a corbelled parapet, flanked by mullioned windows with hood moulds over which is a corbel table. The east front has a three-bay verandah on cast iron columns, and a wooden arcade with decorated spandrels, and pendants.
All Saints' Church; 54.42423°N 1.52867°W		1909–10	The church, which was extended in 2002, is in red brick with stone dressings and tile roofs. It consists of a continuous nave and chancel, a south porch, and a north vestry. On the roof, at the division between the nave and the chancel, is a hexagonal shingled flèche, with a louvred bell stage and an iron weathervane.
War memorial 54.42432°N 1.52856°W		1921	The war memorial, to the south of All Saints' Church, is in stone. It consists of a wheel-head cross on a tapering square plinth on a base of one step. On the head is a panel in the shape of a wheel-head with an interlaced Celtic knotwork design, below which is an inscribed panel. On the southeast face is a panel with the names of those lost in the First World War, and in front of the face is a plinth with an inscription and the names of the two servicemen lost in the Second World War.
