= Danby Wiske railway station =

Disused railway station in North Yorkshire, England

Danby Wiske
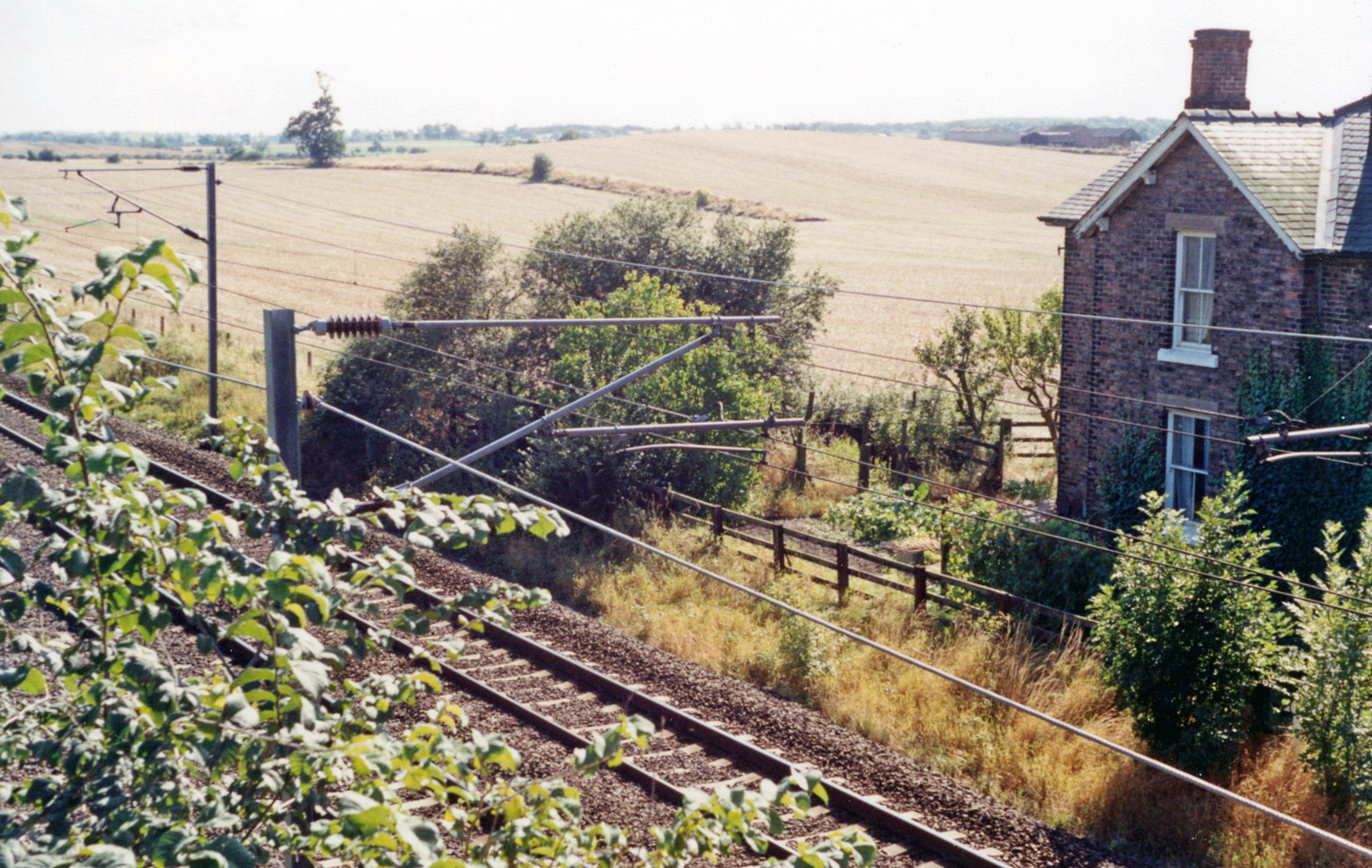
- Site of the station in 1991

General information
- Location: Danby Wiske, North Yorkshire; England
- Coordinates: 54.384634°N 1.472606°W
- Grid reference: SE343989
- Platforms: 2

Other information
- Status: Disused

History
- Original company: North Eastern Railway
- Post-grouping: London and North Eastern Railway

Key dates
- 1884: Opened
- 15 September 1958: Closed
Location

Danby Wiske railway station was a station on the East Coast Main Line. It was located approximately 1/2 mile (0.8 km) east of Danby Wiske, in North Yorkshire. Opened on 1 December 1884 the station was closed to passengers on 15 September 1958.

To the south of the station at milepost 32 (measured from York) were Danby Wiske (also known as Wiske Moor) water troughs to allow fast steam locomotives to take on water whilst still running. Because of the spray when they collected water, the troughs could not be located at big stations (such as Northallerton or Darlington) with Danby Wiske being one of six locations on the East Coast Main Line that had the water troughs. Brought into use in 1901, they were the second set on the NER, after Lucker.

The LNER introduced The Coronation express service in July 1937, which ran between King's Cross and Edinburgh, calling only at York (southbound trains also called at Newcastle), so it was necessary for the A4 Pacific locomotive to pick up plenty of water at water troughs in order to avoid unscheduled stops. Locomotive crews on the northbound Coronation soon reported that at Wiske Moor troughs, the amount of water picked up was sometimes insufficient to reach Lucker troughs without stopping at Newcastle. It was arranged that on 8 October 1937, both the northbound and southbound Coronation trains would carry a railway inspector on the footplate in order to observe the water pick-ups. It so happened that the two trains passed each other at Wiske Moor, where one of the inspectors received fatal injuries. The northbound train (hauled by no. 4491 Commonwealth of Australia) had lowered their scoop to its limit, which when the water filled the tender, was unable to be retracted because of the force holding it there. The overflowing water hit the southbound express (hauled by no. 4492 Dominion of New Zealand) causing widespread damage, but critically, it forced out the glass from the locomotive's windows. The glass hit the railway inspector at the base of the neck and left him unconscious. He was taken off the train at Northallerton but later died in hospital. Several measures were taken in order to avoid a recurrence: a 60 mph (97 km/h) speed restriction was imposed on the Coronation service at Wiske Moor troughs; the tenders were modified so that any overflow was carried down through pipes, and armoured glass was fitted instead of Triplex toughened glass.

Preceding station	Historical railways	Following station
Northallerton; Line and station open	North Eastern Railway; East Coast Main Line	Cowton; Line open, station closed
