= Listed buildings in Birkby, North Yorkshire =

Birkby is a civil parish in the county of North Yorkshire, England. It contains five listed buildings that are recorded in the National Heritage List for England. All the listed buildings are designated at Grade II, the lowest of the three grades, which is applied to "buildings of national importance and special interest". The parish contains the village of Birkby and the surrounding countryside, and the listed buildings consist of a house and associated structures, a church and a milepost.

== Buildings ==
Name and location	Photograph	Date	Notes
Birkby Manor; 54.41616°N 1.49055°W	—	Late 18th century	The house is in red brick with a hipped Welsh slate roof. There are two storeys and three bays. In the centre is a porch, and a doorway with pilasters, a fanlight, a frieze and a cornice. The windows are sashes with flat brick arches.
Garden cottage, Birkby Manor; 54.41580°N 1.49140°W	—	Late 18th century	The cottage and attached privy are in red brick, and have pantile roofs with coped gables. The building has a large round arch, infilled with brick and an inserted door, and sash windows, one of which is horizontally-sliding.
Stables, coach house and wall, Birkby Manor; 54.41611°N 1.49119°W	—	Late 18th century	The stables and coach house are in red brick with pantile roofs. The coach house has two storeys and three bays. In the ground floor are three round-arched entrances and doorways, and there are sash windows in both floors. To the right and recessed is a single-storey stable range with twelve bays, containing round-arched doorways and sash windows. Adjoining the buildings is a tall brick wall.
St Peter's Church; 54.41579°N 1.49061°W		1776	The church was altered in 1872, and two vestries were added in 1888 by C. Hodgson Fowler. It is built in brick on a stone plinth, and has stone dressings, a sill band, and a stone slate roof. The church consists of a nave, a south porch, and a chancel with a canted apse. At the west end is a bellcote with two pointed-arched bell openings, and a round-headed arch above. The porch contains a doorway with a pointed arch and a chamfered surround, diagonal buttresses, and it has a coped gable with a cross.
Milepost; 54.40710°N 1.45417°W		Late 19th century	The milestone on the west side of the A167 road is in cast iron. It has a triangular plan and a sloping top, and is about 0.5 metres (1 ft 8 in) high. On the top is the distance to London, the left side has the distance to Darlington, and on the right face is the distance to "No Allerton".
