= Thomas Rymer =

English poet and antiquary, c. 1643–1713

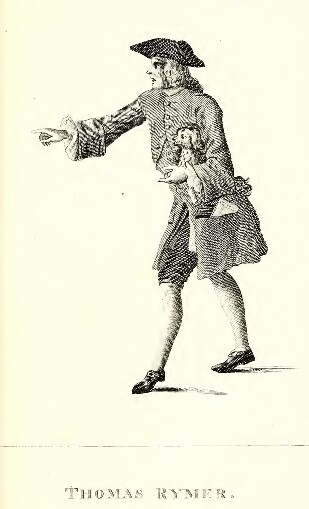
Thomas Rymer and his King Charles Spaniel, Pompey, portrayed in 1819.

Thomas Rymer (c. 1643 – 14 December 1713) was an English poet, literary critic, antiquary and historiographer.

His lasting contribution was to compile and publish under royal warrant the 17 volumes (the last two posthumously) of the first edition of Foedera, a work conveying English government documents and treaties between The Crown of England and foreign powers from 1101 to 1625. (Note: A further unauthorised three volumes (18–20), published 1726–1735 in the same format and dealing with the years 1625–1654, were compiled by his assistant Robert Sanderson, but are technically not part of Rymer's 1st edition.)

Rymer held the office of English Historiographer Royal from 1692 until his death in 1713, which allowed him access to the historical documents published in Foedera and held in the Tower of London and elsewhere.

He is credited with coining the phrase "poetic justice" in The Tragedies of the Last Age Consider'd (1678).

== Life ==
=== Early life and education ===
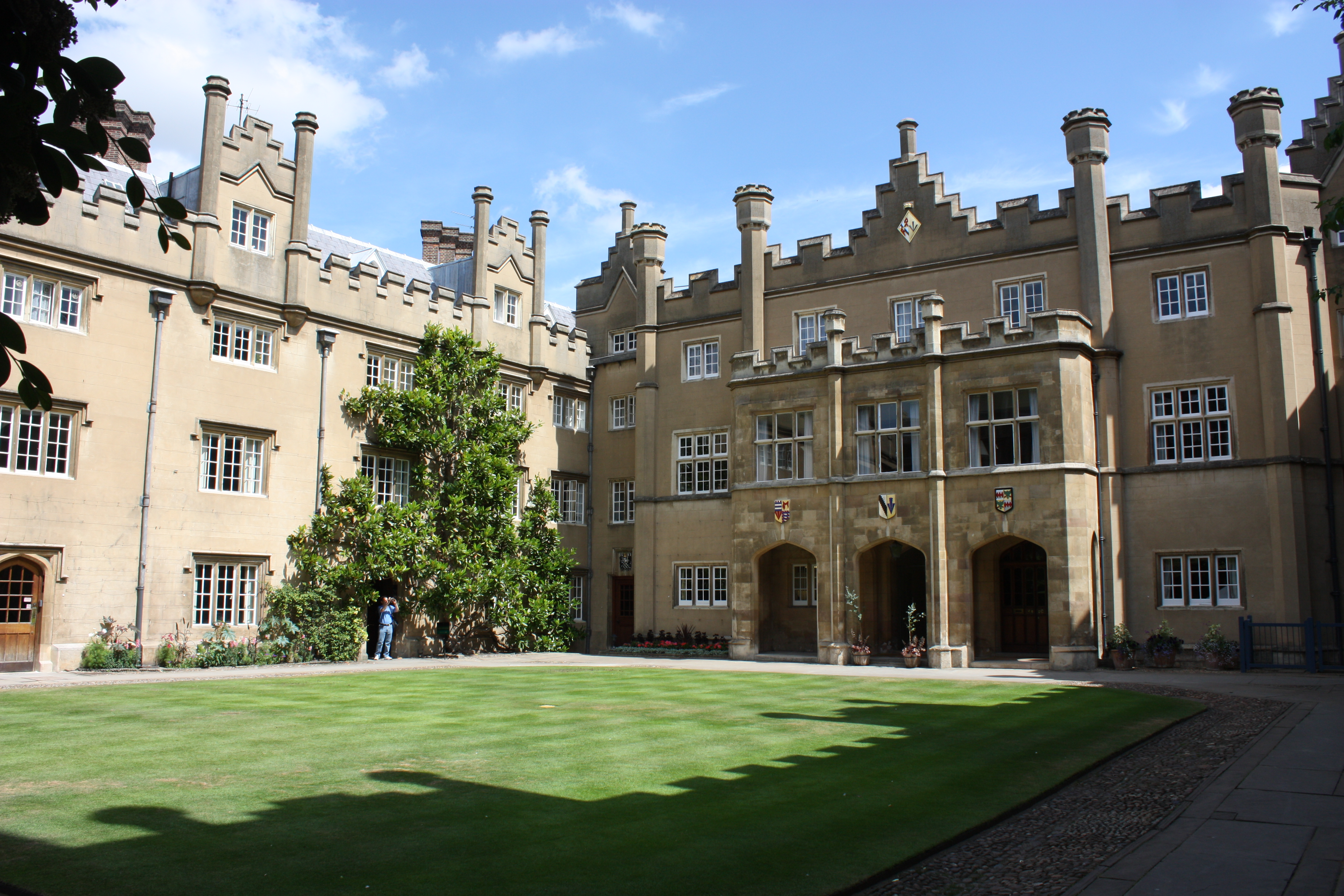
Sidney Sussex College, Cambridge, where Rymer studied

Thomas Rymer was born at Appleton Wiske, near Northallerton in the North Riding of Yorkshire in 1643, or possibly at Yafforth. He was the younger son of Ralph Rymer, lord of the manor of Brafferton in Yorkshire, said by Clarendon to possess a good estate. The son studied at Northallerton Grammar School, where he was a classmate of George Hickes. There he studied for eight years under Thomas Smelt, a noted Royalist. Aged 16, he went to study at Sidney Sussex College, Cambridge, matriculating on 29 April 1659.

Although Rymer was still at Cambridge in 1662 when he contributed Latin verses to a university volume to mark the marriage of Charles II and Catherine of Braganza, there is no record of his taking a degree. This may have been due to financial problems his father was suffering at the time, or to his father's arrest on 13 October 1663 — he was executed the following year for involvement in the Farnley Wood Plot, an intended uprising in Yorkshire against Charles II. Although Thomas's elder brother Ralph was also arrested and imprisoned, Thomas was not implicated. On 2 May 1666 he became a member of Gray's Inn. He was called to the bar on 16 June 1673.

=== Literary career ===
From 1674 to 1693 Rymer published a variety of works. He wrote a play; made a number of English translations of Latin authors, especially the poetry of Ovid; contributed prefaces in Latin and English to editions of works by various authors, including Thomas Hobbes; wrote political tracts; and published literary criticism, notably against Shakespeare. These are all discussed in the § Literary works section below.

=== Historiographer ===
On the death of Thomas Shadwell in 1692, Rymer was appointed Historiographer Royal at a yearly salary of £200.

Under a royal warrant of 1693 and working with original documents dating back to the 12th century, many held in the Tower of London, for the rest of his life he collated and published Foedera (lit. 'pacts' or 'alliances'), a collection of treaties made between the English Crown and foreign European powers, and a great variety of other English government documents. The publication history of its 17 volumes (1704–1717) is somewhat involved, complicated by Rymer's death in 1713. See § Foedera below.

=== Death ===
Rymer died on 14 December 1713 and was buried four days later in St Clement Danes' Church in the Strand in London. He appears not to have left any immediate family.

== Works ==
=== Literary works ===
Rymer's first appearance in print (Note: A 1688 translation into English of William Bellenden's Ciceronis Princeps (first published anonymously in Paris in 1608) sometimes said to be Thomas Rymer's first publication, has been shown by Curt Zimansky to be the work of Thomas Ross (1620–1675), courtier, poet and tutor to the first Duke of Monmouth.) was as translator of René Rapin's Reflections on Aristotle's Treatise of Poesie (1674), to which he added a preface in defence of the classic rules for unity in drama. (Note: "Thomas Rymer: Reflections on Aristotle's Treatise of Poesie: The Preface of the Translator". English Poetry 1579-1830: Spenser and the Tradition. This page includes thoughts of other critics about Rymer, expressed in George Saintsbury (1911) History of English Criticism, pp. 133–134, Herbert E. Cory (1911) Critics of Edmund Spenser, pp. 120–121, Harko Gerrit De Maar (1924), History of Modern English Romanticism, p. 34, and H. T. Swedenberg (1944), Theory of the Epic in England, p. 47.) Following the principles set there, he composed a verse tragedy licensed on 13 September 1677, called Edgar, or the English Monarch, which failed. Edgar was printed in 1678, with a second edition in 1693. The plot is mostly drawn from William of Malmesbury, and abounds in strong royalist sentiment. The play was written in rhyming heroic couplets, much like John Dryden's works. Rymer writes in the advertisement in the beginning, "I doubted, indeed, whether Rhyme was proper for Tragedy. Not that I thought it unnaturall; for, questionless, 'tis more naturall to speak in Rhyme then to speak English." Ultimately, Rymer concluded that since the tragedy ends happily, rhyme was the appropriate medium. In this Rymer joined in the argument over the place in Anglophone verse drama, joining John Dryden's initial defense. Rymer's hope was to promulgate what he saw as the values of classical drama, typically known as the Unities. The play was not a success, as attested to by Joseph Addison who referred to the play in The Spectator (no. 692) as a typical example of dramatic failure.

Rymer's views on drama, especially verse drama and heroic couplets, were again given to the world in a printed letter to Fleetwood Shepheard, a friend of Matthew Prior, entitled The Tragedies of the Last Age Consider'd (1678). Here, in discussing Rollo Duke of Normandy by John Fletcher, Philip Massinger, Ben Jonson, and George Chapman, Rymer coined the term "poetical justice".

To Ovid's Epistles Translated by Several Hands (1680), prefaced by Dryden, Rymer contributed Penelope to Ulysses. (Note: This went through numerous expanding editions: e. g. Ovid; Rymer, Thomas (1776). "Penelope to Ulysses". In Dryden, John (preface) (ed.). Ovid's Epistles: with his Amours. Translated into English Verse by the Most Eminent Hands. London: Printed for T. Davies, W. Strahan, W. Clarke, et al.) He was also one of those who Englished the so-called Dryden's Plutarch of 1683–1686 (5 vols.): the life of Nicias fell to his share. Rymer wrote a preface to Whitelocke's Memorials of English Affairs (1682), and in 1681 A General Draught and Prospect of the Government of Europe, reprinted in 1689 and 1714 as Of the Antiquity, Power, and Decay of Parliaments, where ignorant of a future dignity that would be his, he had the misfortune to observe, "You are not to expect truth from an historiographer royal."

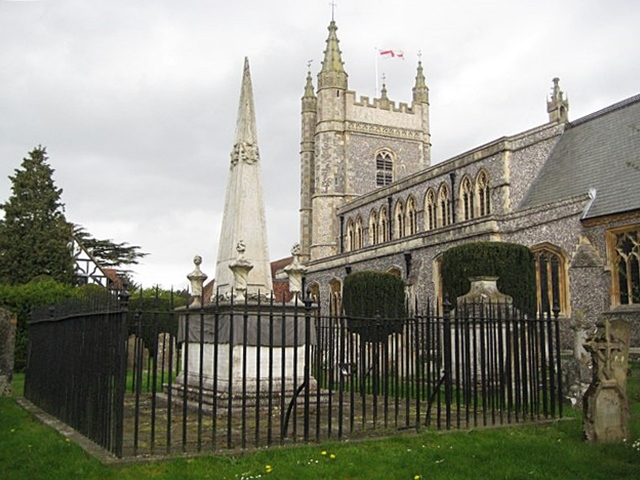
Monument to Edmund Waller with poetical inscriptions by Rymer in Beaconsfield churchyard

Rymer contributed three pieces to the collection of Poems to the Memory of Edmund Waller (1688) (Note: The poems are: On Mr. Waller. T. Rymer (p. 4); Monsieur St. Euremon. 1684 (In French). In English, by T. R. (p. 10); To Mr. Riley, Drawing Mr. Waller's Picture. T. R. (p. 26). "It is not improbable that the initials T. R., signed to several of the pieces, are those of Thomas Rymer, who is believed to have edited the volume and who signed one of the poems in full.") (afterwards reprinted in Dryden's Miscellany Poems), (Note: The poems are again On Mr. Waller By Mr. T. Rymer (pp. 223–225); Monsieur St. Euremon. 1684. In English, by T. R. (p. 234); To Mr. Riley, Drawing Mr. Waller's Picture. By Mr. T. Rymer (p. 267). The attribution of the Riley poem is 'By Mr. Rymer', rather than 'T. R.' in the 1688 version.) and wrote the Latin inscription on all four sides of Edmund Waller's monument in Beaconsfield churchyard.

The preface ("Lectori salutem") to the posthumous Historia Ecclesiastica (1688) of Thomas Hobbes seems to have been written by Rymer. (Note: William Molesworth, in his 1845 edition of Hobbes says that the preface is by Rymer and that the original title page and motto must be ascribed to him. Patricia Springborg also says the introduction is by Rymer.) An English translation appeared in 1722. The Life of Hobbes (1681), sometimes ascribed to him, was written by Richard Blackburne. (Note: See [Grant, Arthur Henry (1886). "Blackburne, Richard" . Dictionary of National Biography. Vol. 05. pp. 124–125. ] by Arthur Henry Grant in DNB, Volume 5: "Dr. Blackburne certainly wrote a Latin supplement to the short "Life", entitled "Vitae Hobbianie Auctarium", the first sentence of which supplies the chief evidence of his authorship of the "Life". Both these works would seem to have been derived from a larger and fuller "Life" in manuscript, written in English by John Aubrey and used with the knowledge and consent of the latter, and possibly with the assistance of Hobbes himself.") He produced a congratulatory poem on the arrival of Queen Mary in Westminster with William III on 12 February 1689. (Note: (Rymer 1689). Rymer compares Mary to Pyhrra, Deucalion's bride: according to Ovid, after the Deluge the couple threw rocks over their shoulders, which metamorphosed into babies who grew up and re-populated the world.)

Rymer's next piece of authorship was to translate the sixth elegy of the third book of Ovid's Tristia for Dryden's Poetical Miscellanies. The only version to contain Rymer's rendering seems to be the second edition of the second part of the Miscellanies, subtitled Silvae (1692). (Note: Dryden and Jacob Tonson's Poetical Miscellanies has a somewhat involved publishing history of numerous editions with various titles, reprints and bindings. The second edition of the second part (1692) seems to be the only one to contain Rymer's translation, and was apparently only published bound up with some copies of the second edition of the first part (also 1692). The first edition of the second Ppart appeared as Sylvæ: or the Second Part of Poetical Miscellanies (1685). A second edition of Sylvae was published in 1692 and was bound with the second edition of part one of the Miscellany Poems (1692) (Part One, 1st ed. published 1684, reissued 1685). This second edition of the first and second Parts was published in 1692 (Dryden 1692). It seems to be the only version to contain Rymer's translation. There are online copies or text-only versions, but none seem to be freely available. In addition, some copies of the first edition of Sylvæ (not containing Rymer's Ovid) were bound with the second edition of the Miscellany Poems. Rymer's Ovid does not seem to appear in the third edition of the first part of the Miscellany Poems (1702) or in the fourth edition of the second part of the Miscellany Poems. The third part (or volume) is Examen Poeticum (1693).)

Shortly after Rymer's appointment as Historiographer Royal in 1692, there appeared his much-discussed A Short View of Tragedy (1693), criticising Shakespeare and Ben Jonson, which gave rise to The Impartial Critick (1693) of John Dennis, the epigram of Dryden.

=== Foedera ===
==== First edition ====
Rymer's lasting contribution to scholarship was the Foedera, conventiones, literæ, et cujuscunque generis acta publica (abbr. Foed.), a collection of "all the leagues, treaties, alliances, capitulations, and confederacies, which have at any time been made between the Crown of England and any other kingdoms, princes and states", and a mass of other state documents then held in the Tower of London. Begun under a royal warrant in 1693, it was "an immense labour of research and transcription on which he spent the last twenty years of his life". Documents were presented in their original Latin. Sir Thomas Duffus Hardy's later Syllabus (1869-1885) provided summaries in English, despite the multiple incorrect assertions of certain websites.

During his last two decades Rymer prepared for the press the text of vols. 1 through 15, most of vol. 16, and some of vol. 17, but only lived to see the publication of vols. 1 though 15, with printing of the latter, according to Sir Thomas Duffus Hardy, "finished on the 25th of August 1713, about four months before the death of Rymer" These fifteen volumes of the 1st edition which Rymer saw to publication covered the period from May 1101 (Henry I) up to July 1586, half-way through the reign of Elizabeth I. He was assisted by Robert Sanderson, who completed and published by 1717 the material of Rymer's two unfinished volumes covering the period up to 1625 (death of James I), including an index to the whole work of which it was written, "nothing can well be more inconvenient".

Sanderson, working on his own account (i.e. unsanctioned by a Royal warrant), published in the same format three further volumes (vols. 18–20, pub. 1731–1735) of lesser quality, dealing with domestic history rather than foreign affairs. Hardy does not consider them to be properly part of Rymer's 1st edition. Hardy is highly critical of these last three volumes, saying that only about a quarter of the articles deserve to be there. Sanderson added some extraneous material which, according to Hardy, change the whole focus of the work: "Instead of a Foedera he has rather produced a new work in the shape of materials for our domestic history, in which foreign affairs are slightly intermingled." The Gentleman's Magazine of Edinburgh in 1834 described Sanderson's contributions as "the last three being supplementary."

==== Later editions ====
The following section contains a general outline of the complex and involved publication history of further editions of the Foedera.

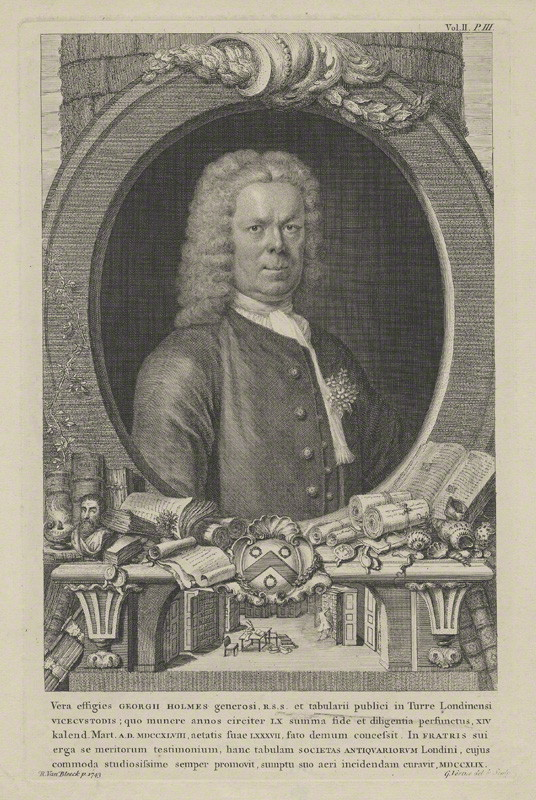
George Holmes, editor of the 2nd edition

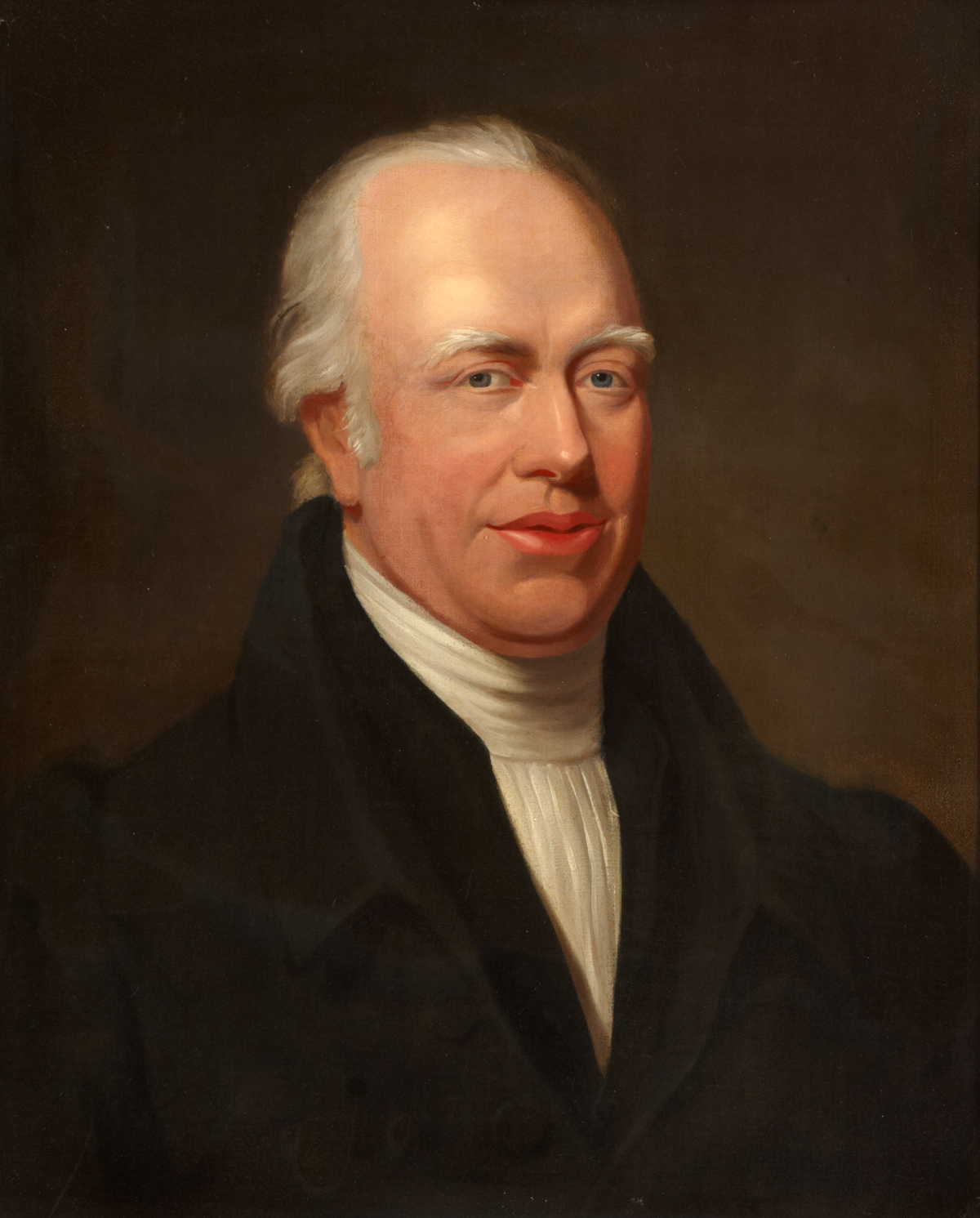
Adam Clarke, editor of the 4th ("Record") edition

George Holmes, clerk to Sir William Petyt, Keeper of the Records in the Tower of London revised the first 17 volumes in a 2nd edition (pub. 1727–1735), and also published a single folio in 1730 of corrections or 'Amendations' to the first edition only.

Hardy states that Holmes was employed by the publisher of the first edition, Jacob Tonson, from p. 112 of Vol. 1, up to the end of Vol. 12 only; and that the subsequent third edition is essentially an edited reprint of the 17 vols. of the 2nd edition, plus Sanderson's last 3 volumes unredacted.

A re-set and newly edited 3rd ("Hague") edition (10 vols. in two-column format, pub. 1737–1745, including Sanderson's 'supplemental' volumes 18-20), was published and possibly edited by John Neaulme in The Hague, in "ten closely-printed folio volumes". (Note: All volumes are scanned at the Internet Archive. Volumes 8 to 12 (of 20, covering 1397 to 1502) are available at British History Online, collated with the English summaries from Hardy's Syllabus, but not implementing his considerable list of errata, and without attribution.) The first nine reprinted the 2nd edition by Holmes, with the tenth combining the French-language synopses (abrégés) of Vols. 1–17 by Jean Le Clerc and Paul de Rapin, which had appeared soon after the English publication of each successive volume, with a new index to this edition of the Foedera. Rapin's abridgements of Vols. II–XIX (but not I or XX) had been earlier translated into English in 1733.

The Record Commission in 1800 proposed a "Supplement and Continuation" to the Foedera; in 1809 it decided instead to make a complete revision, the 4th ("Record") edition. Seven parts were prepared before the project was abandoned after the Commissioners became dissatisfied with the editing of Dr. Adam Clarke and others. Six parts in three volumes were published from 1816 to 1830 and the seventh in 1869, along with miscellaneous notes. (Note: All volumes are scanned at HathiTrust.) Foedera was thus seemingly revised up to the year 1383, but this edition has attracted considerable criticism.

A three-volume English-language summary and index (Syllabus) to the 1st, 3rd and 4th editions of Foedera was published by Sir Thomas Duffus Hardy in 1869–1885. In the introduction to his second volume, Hardy was highly critical of Clarke who, although an industrious biblical and oriental scholar, was utterly unskilled in diplomacy or palaeography, and lacking any profound acquaintance with the English historical and antiquarian literature. (Note: Hardy 1869, p. cii-iii, Hardy 1873, pp. xix–xx) Hardy prints a short list of 50 errors he randomly found in Clarke's edition. He spends ten whole pages berating the editors of the Record edition for both what they included and what they omitted, especially for copying from printed sources and not consulting original MS, even though they were easily available and to hand. Hardy also blames Clarke for criticising Rymer and Holmes, although Clarke proceeded to commit the same sort of faults himself. The Gentleman's Magazine of July 1834 also notes that although Clarke was a distinguished orientalist himself, the sole entry in Arabic in the 4th edition has a mistake.

Despite Hardy's extensive condemnation of the editors and publications of the Record Commission, backed up by multiple examples of their errors, the Victoria County History recommends citing the Record Commission (RC) edition where available and the Hague edition otherwise.

All the editions thus suffer from various defects, and no complete and correct revision has been published as of 2024. Hardy had intended in his Syllabus to correct not only all the errors in Clarke, but in the whole of the first three editions as well: but this proved to be beyond him, faced with a vast array of material. Hardy's work is probably the most reliable guide to the Foedera, but even confirming a single fact can involve checking multiple sources of the various editions of the Foedera and their indexes, along with Holmes's 'Emendations' and his own copy of the 1st edition, against Hardy's Syllabus and its own index, and also his list of errata.

Preceded by Thomas Shadwell	English Historiographer Royal; 1692–1714	Succeeded by Thomas Madox
