= All Saints' Church, East Cowton =

Anglican church in North Yorkshire, England

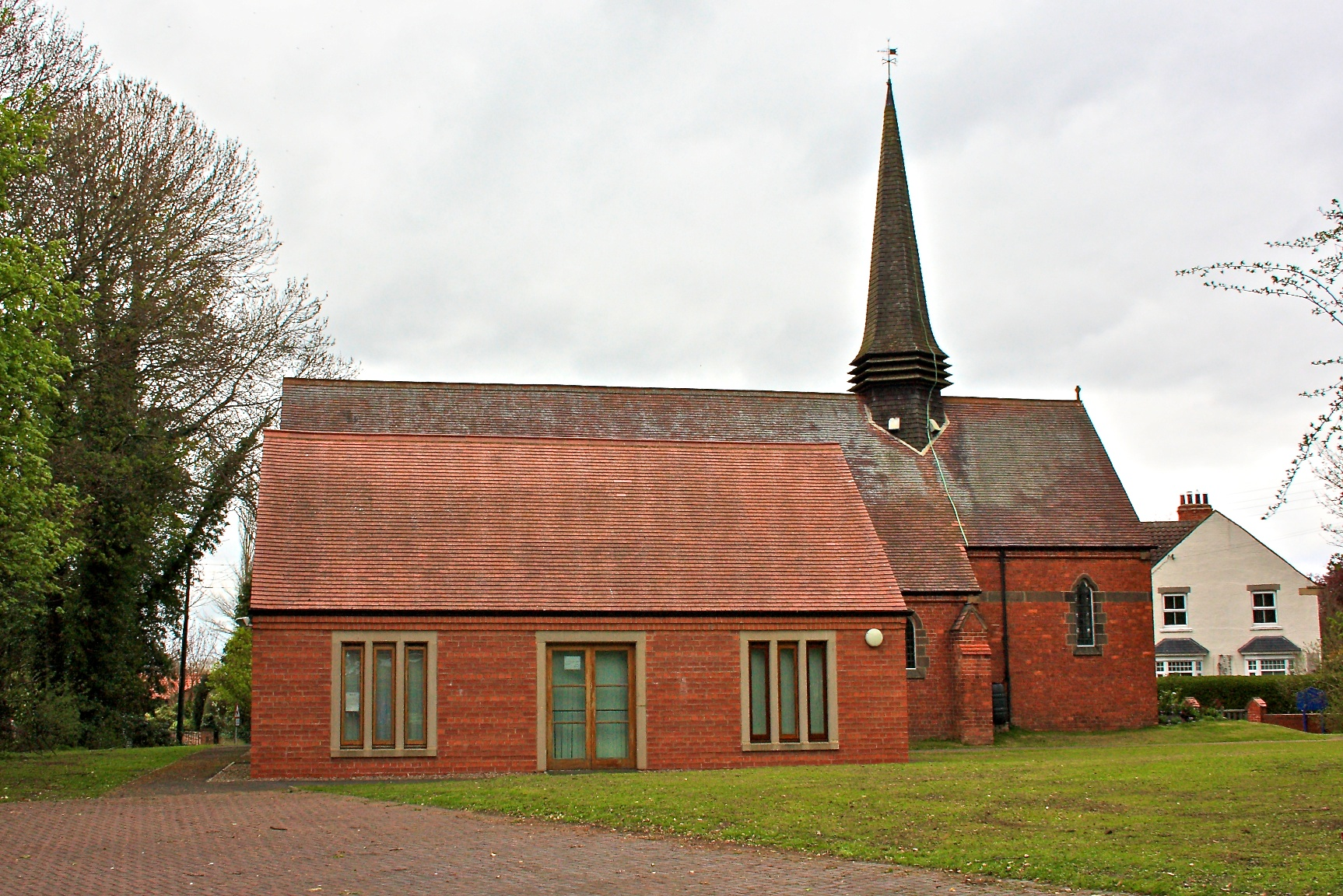
- The church, in 2012

- Location within North Yorkshire
- 54°25′27″N 1°31′43″W
- OS grid reference: NZ 30679 03300

All Saints' Church is an Anglican church in East Cowton, a village in North Yorkshire, in England.

A stone church, dedicated to Saint Mary, was built in East Cowton in the 14th century, and largely rebuilt in 1707. It had a nave, chancel, north vestry, south porch, and a small west tower built of brick. The church was some distance from the village centre, and by the early 20th century it was considered to be too small, and in need of major repair. Instead, it was abandoned, and a new church was completed in 1910, to the designs of John Woolfall and Thomas Eccles. By 1966, the old church was described as "a rotting barn-like building with a square brick tower", and it was demolished in 1968. The new building was grade II listed in 1998, and it was extended in 2002.

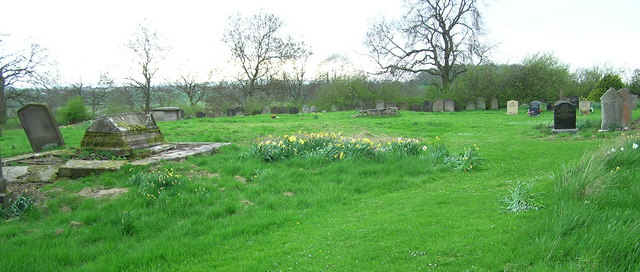
Site of St Mary's Church

The church is built of red brick with stone dressings and tile roofs. It consists of a continuous nave and chancel, a south porch, and a north vestry. On the roof, at the division between the nave and the chancel, is a hexagonal shingled flèche, with a louvred bell stage and an iron weathervane. Inside is a 12th-century font brought from the old church.

== See also ==
- Listed buildings in East Cowton
