= Listed buildings in Danby Wiske with Lazenby =

Danby Wiske with Lazenby is a civil parish in the county of North Yorkshire, England. It contains six listed buildings that are recorded in the National Heritage List for England. Of these, one is listed at Grade I, the highest of the three grades, one is at Grade II*, the middle grade, and the others are at Grade II, the lowest grade. The parish consists of the village of Danby Wiske and the surrounding countryside. The listed buildings consist of a church, a bridge and four houses.

== Key ==
Grade	Criteria
I	Buildings of exceptional interest, sometimes considered to be internationally important
II*	Particularly important buildings of more than special interest
II	Buildings of national importance and special interest

== Buildings ==
Name and location	Photograph	Date	Notes	Grade
Danby Wiske Church; 54.37945°N 1.48106°W		12th century	The church has been altered and extended through the centuries. It is in sandstone with roofs of Welsh and Westmorland slate, and consists of a nave with a clerestory, a north aisle, a south porch, a chancel and a west tower. The tower has diagonal buttresses, a stair tower with slit windows, two-light bell openings, and an embattled parapet. The nave also has an embattled parapet. The porch is gabled, and the doorway is Norman, with a tympanum containing three carved figures in long robes.	I
Danby Grange; 54.36804°N 1.48592°W	—	Late 16th to early 17th century	A stone farmhouse on a chamfered plinth, with a pantile roof and stone coping. There are two storeys, a double depth plan, and three bays. The central doorway has a shaped lintel, and the windows are horizontally-sliding sashes with hood moulds, continuous over the lower floor openings.	II
Lazenby Hall; 54.38111°N 1.47880°W	—	1640s or 1650s (probable)	The house is in stone, with a chamfered floor band, and a stone slate roof with chamfered coping and shaped kneelers. There are two storeys and attics, and a main front of five bays, flanked by projecting wings two bays wide and three bays deep. In the centre is a doorway flanked by Doric half-shafts on a panelled plinth with a pulvinated frieze and a dentilled cornice. The windows are double-chamfered mullioned and transomed, divided by Doric pilasters under a continuous cornice, some of which have been replaced by sashes. The middle bay is flanked by Ionic half-shafts on panelled plinths with dosserets above.	II*
Manor House; 54.38057°N 1.48324°W	—	17th century	A house in red brick on a part-stone plinth, with stone dressings, quoins, a floor band, stepped eaves and a pantile roof. There are two storeys and five bays. On the front are two doorways, most of the windows are sashes, some horizontally-sliding, and there is a casement window. In the middle of the upper floor is a stone plaque with a raised shield and initials.	II
Danby Hill; 54.37070°N 1.48713°W	—	1767	The house is in red brick with a hipped slate roof. There are three bays, the outer bays bowed, the left two bays with three storeys, and the right bay with two. Over the middle bay is a pediment containing a recessed elliptical datestone. In the centre is a Roman Doric porch with a frieze, a cornice and a blocking course. The windows are sashes with flat brick arches and keystones.	II
Wiske Bridge; 54.38275°N 1.48160°W		1782	The bridge, designed by John Carr, carries Danby Lane over the River Wiske. It is in stone and consists of a single segmental arch. The bridge has voussoirs, two flat buttresses, a band, and a coped parapet.	II
