= Streetlam =

Hamlet in North Yorkshire, England

Coordinates: 54.38506°N 1.52287°W

- Location within North Yorkshire
- Population: 25
- OS grid reference: SE310989
- Civil parish: Danby Wiske with Lazenby
- Unitary authority: North Yorkshire
- Ceremonial county: North Yorkshire
- Region: Yorkshire and the Humber
- Country: England
- Sovereign state: United Kingdom
- Post town: NORTHALLERTON
- Postcode district: DL7
- Dialling code: 01325
- Police: North Yorkshire
- Fire: North Yorkshire
- Ambulance: Yorkshire
- UK Parliament: Richmond and Northallerton

Streetlam is a hamlet in the county of North Yorkshire, England, located 6 miles (9.7 km) north-west of Northallerton. The population fluctuates around 25. Streetlam is situated in a largely flat area of farmland in the Vale of York, which is a low-lying area of ground that extends about 40 miles from north to south in between two hilly national parks to the west and the east. Streetlam is 174 miles (280 km) south of Edinburgh and is 240 miles (387 km) north of London.

The hilly and low mountainous areas of land around Streetlam are called the Pennines and the North York Moors. The Pennines and North York Moors can be seen in the distance to the west and east of Streetlam respectively. The main local industry is farming; however, there are many people in Streetlam and the immediate surrounding area who base themselves locally and commute to work in neighbouring population centres including Northallerton, Darlington and Teesside.

From 1974 to 2023 it was part of the Hambleton District, it is now administered by the unitary North Yorkshire Council.

== History ==
In the 19th century, the hamlet was also known as Streetlands.

There used to be a village inn in Streetlam which would welcome visitors with accommodation and amenities. This inn was changed into a house and is the first house that walkers come across when doing the C2C in the usual west to east format. (Thus, it is the last house on the unconventional east to west format.)

== Tourism ==
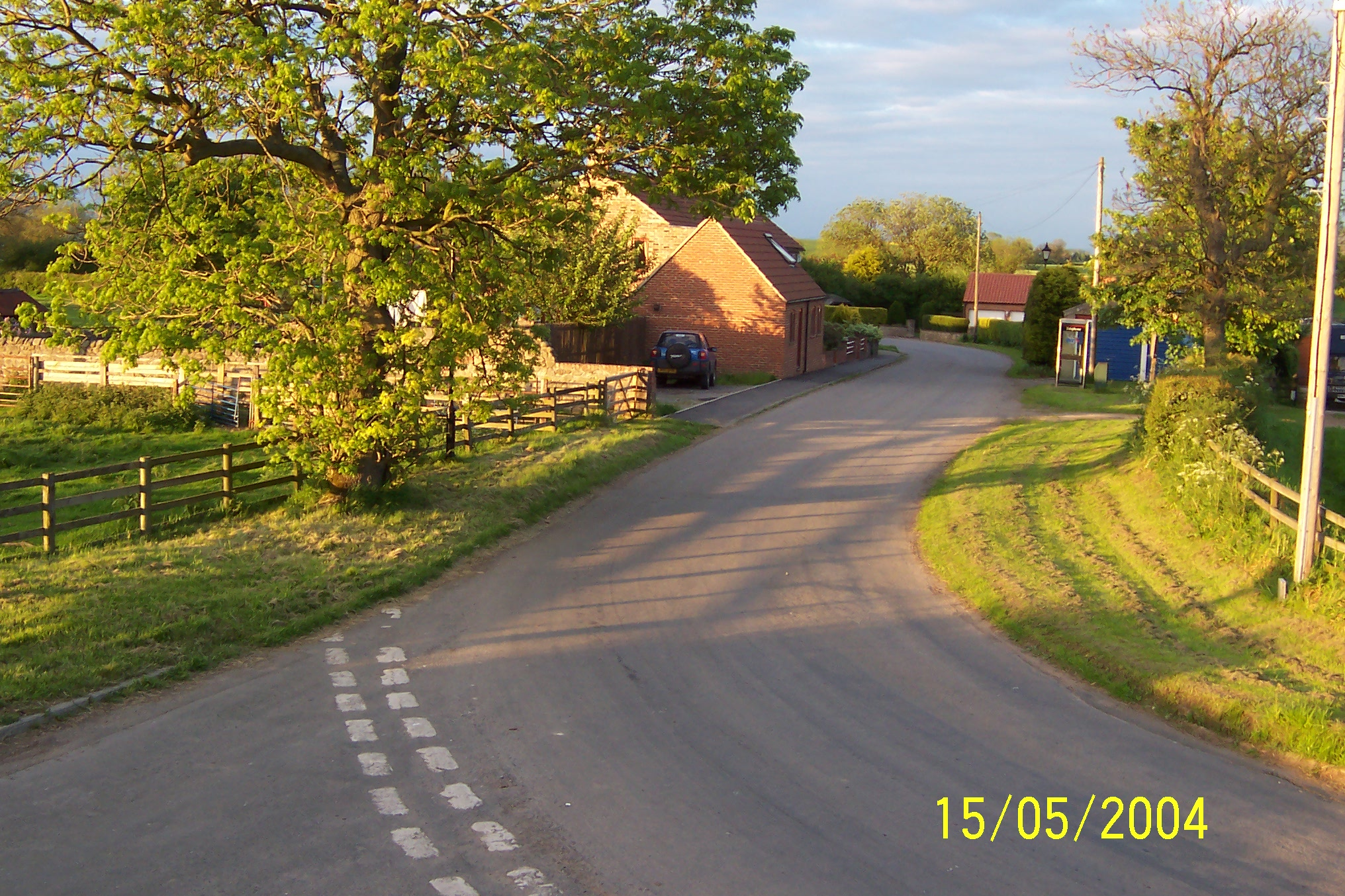
Streetlam centre, near sunset, 15 May 2004

The famous Wainwright's Coast to Coast Walk (C2C) passes through Streetlam, bringing several thousand hikers through the hamlet every season. Most people walk through Streetlam between April and October and many relax on the grass or in the shade of the trees before moving on to the next village, Danby Wiske, where there is a pub. Streetlam is also noted for being in the middle of the "tedious section" of the coast to coast walk, being located in flat land which is navigable by long winding narrow lanes with head-high hedges.

== Climate ==
Streetlam has a climate similar to that of other places in lowland Northern England; however, due to its inland location and being in a large, wide valley, Streetlam plays host to slightly more extreme conditions, leading to slightly colder winters and warmer summers. Cold air drops in from the hills in the west and the east during winter, leading to Streetlam and other neighbouring villages experiencing freezing temperatures which can drop to below −15 °C during very cold nights. Snow is quite rare, lying for around 3 to 10 days each year, although in the winter of 2009/2010 and in November / December 2010 there were spells when snow lay on the ground for approximately five weeks continuously. Summer is warm and largely dry compared with the rest of the UK with a mixture of cloud, sun and occasional light rain. Extremes do sometimes occur in the summer as was seen notably in 2003 and 2006, when 35 °C was recorded. Please see the climate statistics for Leeming (the nearest weather station) below and assume slightly more extreme averages for Streetlam.

Climate data for Leeming (North Yorkshire): Average maximum and minimum temperatures, and average rainfall recorded between 1991 and 2020 by the Met Office.elevation: 32 m (105 ft)
| Month | Jan | Feb | Mar | Apr | May | Jun | Jul | Aug | Sep | Oct | Nov | Dec | Year |
|---|---|---|---|---|---|---|---|---|---|---|---|---|---|
| Mean daily maximum °C (°F) | 7.0 (44.6) | 7.8 (46.0) | 10.2 (50.4) | 13.0 (55.4) | 16.0 (60.8) | 18.7 (65.7) | 21.0 (69.8) | 20.5 (68.9) | 17.9 (64.2) | 13.9 (57.0) | 9.9 (49.8) | 7.2 (45.0) | 13.6 (56.5) |
| Mean daily minimum °C (°F) | 1.1 (34.0) | 1.1 (34.0) | 2.2 (36.0) | 3.9 (39.0) | 6.5 (43.7) | 9.6 (49.3) | 11.6 (52.9) | 11.4 (52.5) | 9.3 (48.7) | 6.5 (43.7) | 3.4 (38.1) | 1.0 (33.8) | 5.65 (42.17) |
| Average precipitation mm (inches) | 53.8 (2.12) | 44.0 (1.73) | 39.4 (1.55) | 46.2 (1.82) | 43.8 (1.72) | 58.8 (2.31) | 56.2 (2.21) | 65.3 (2.57) | 56.9 (2.24) | 65.0 (2.56) | 64.8 (2.55) | 59.5 (2.34) | 653.7 (25.74) |
| Average precipitation days (≥ 1.0 mm) | 12.0 | 10.0 | 8.5 | 9.0 | 8.7 | 9.4 | 9.3 | 10.1 | 9.1 | 11.1 | 12.2 | 11.9 | 121.4 |
| Mean monthly sunshine hours | 58.1 | 81.7 | 121.5 | 153.8 | 195.0 | 175.9 | 185.5 | 171.2 | 132.7 | 93.4 | 63.7 | 54.2 | 1,486.7 |
Source: Met Office

== Sport ==
Streetlam is home to an amateur football team called Streetlam Farmers, who play in Hambleton Ales Division 2 every Sunday within season. The team spent one year in Division 1 during the 2003–04 season and play their home games on a local field which is maintained during the football season.
