= Listed buildings in South Cowton =

South Cowton is a civil parish in the county of North Yorkshire, England. It contains six listed buildings that are recorded in the National Heritage List for England. Of these, two are listed at Grade I, the highest of the three grades, and the others are at Grade II, the lowest grade. The parish contains the village of South Cowton and the surrounding area, and the listed buildings consist of a church, a former tower house, and a large house together with associated structures.

== Key ==
Grade	Criteria
I	Buildings of exceptional interest, sometimes considered to be internationally important
II	Buildings of national importance and special interest

== Buildings ==
Name and location	Photograph	Date	Notes	Grade
St Mary's Church; 54.41860°N 1.54968°W		15th century	The church is built in rubble and sandstone and has lead roofs. It consists of a nave, a south porch, a chancel with a northeast vestry, and a west tower. The tower has two stages, a stair turret with a parapet, two-light bell openings with ogee heads and a hood mould, and an embattled parapet with corner pinnacles. The porch has two storeys and contains a pointed doorway with a chamfered surround and a hood mould, above which are two panels and a parapet with pinnacles. The south wall of the chancel contains a priest's door, above which is a blocked round-arched window and two panels with coats of arms.	I
South Cowton Castle; 54.41599°N 1.54764°W		Late 15th century	A tower house later used as a farmhouse, it is in stone with a tile roof and embattled parapets. It has a rectangular plan, with towers at the southwest and northeast, and a west outshut. There are three storeys, the northeast front has four bays, and the towers have four storeys. The doorway has a four-centred arched head, a traceried fanlight and a hood mould. The windows vary, and have chamfered quoined surrounds. On the front is a carved stone panel.	I
Pepper Arden; 54.41140°N 1.54442°W	—	Early 18th century	The house, which was later extended, is in red brick, with rendering, floor bands, a cornice, a balustraded parapet with ball finials, and a Welsh slate roof. The main block has three storeys and seven bays, it is flanked by canted two-storey bays, to the left is a wing with two storeys and two bays, and beyond that is a service wing. On the centre of the main block is a Doric porch with a frieze, a cornice with mutules, and a blocking course, and a doorway with a fanlight. Above it is a window with a segmental pediment, and the other windows are sashes with keystones, double in the lower two floors.	II
Gateway, Pepper Arden; 54.41072°N 1.54728°W		Late 18th century	The gateway at the entrance to the drive to the south of the house is flanked by round stone gate piers with plinths, stone bands, cornices and stepped, shallow conical caps. Between and outside them are wrought iron gates and railings. These are flanked by curved brick walls with stone coping, ending in cylindrical stone podia with ball finials.	II
Water tower, Pepper Arden; 54.4122140°N 1.54452°W	—	Mid to late 19th century	The water tower is in red brick, with yellow brick banding, and a pyramidal stone slate roof with a weathervane. It has a plinth and giant angle pilasters flanking round-arched recessed panels. The tower contains a segmental-arched doorway, above which is a stepped and cogged cornice, a stone band and a tripartite window, and a cornice with consoles.	II
Stables, Pepper Arden; 54.41280°N 1.54571°W		Late 19th century	The stable buildings are in red brick, with banding in yellow brick, stone dressings and a Welsh slate roof. They surround a square courtyard and have a central range with two storeys and a clock tower. The entrance front has one storey and 15 bays, and contains a central carriage entrance with an architrave and a keystone. This is flanked by Tuscan columns on a plinth, with a frieze and a cornice, a keystone and paterae, above which is a pediment, The central range has two storeys and 15 bays, the middle bay projecting and containing a round-arched doorway, above which is an arched window with an open pediment. In the centre is a clock tower with a pyramidal roof and a square stone bellcote.	II
