= Dodona's Grove =

1640 poem by James Howell

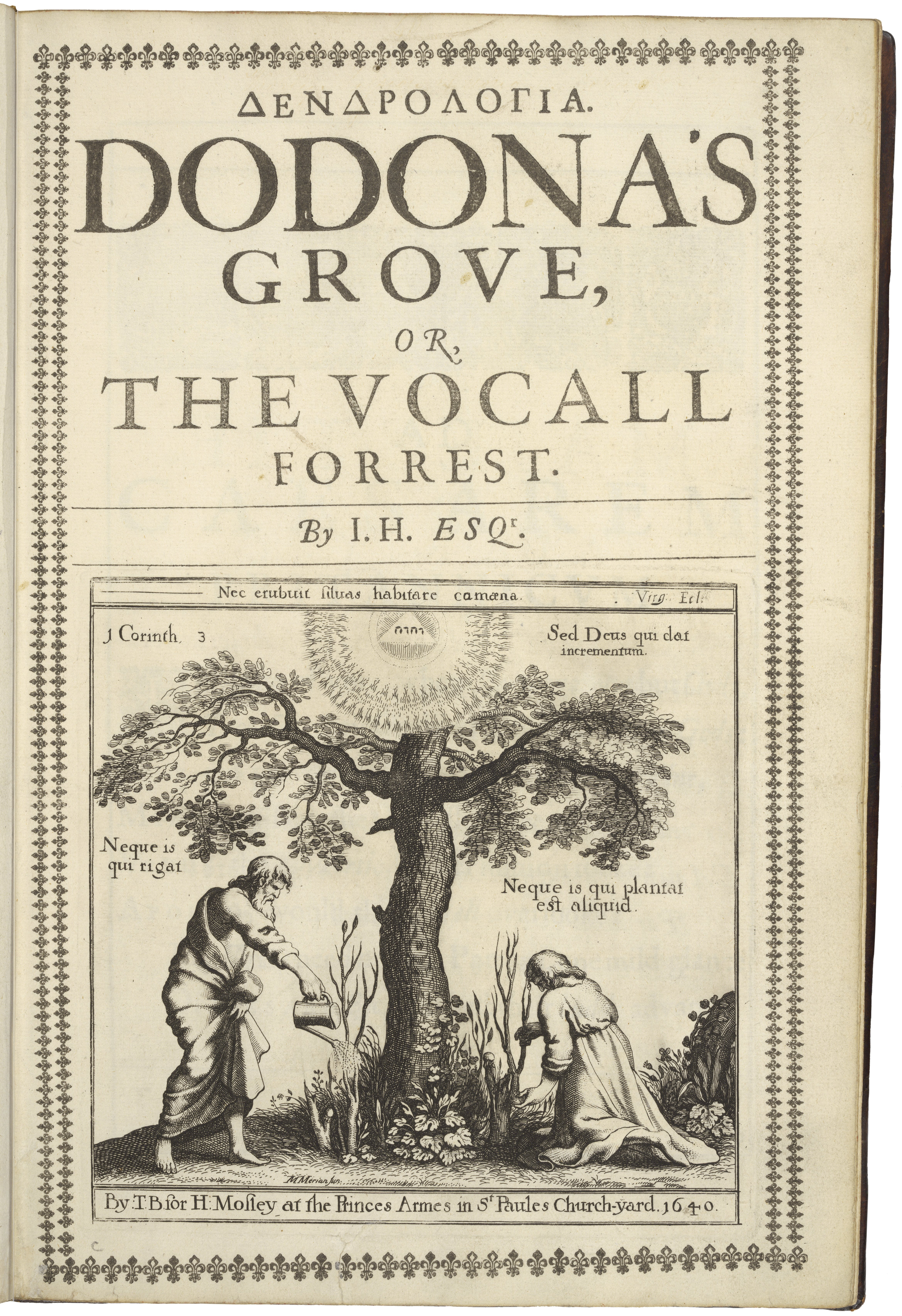
Title page of the first edition of Dodona's Grove (Folger Shakespeare Library)

Dendrologia: Dodona's Grove, or the Vocal Forest is a poem by the Welsh historian James Howell, published in 1640. The poem launched Howell's literary career. It was published in English in multiple editions and was translated into French and Latin.

== Description ==
Dodona's Grove is an allegory of Europe, particularly England, depicting events between 1603 and 1640. Dodona, in the title, refers to the ancient Hellenic oracle of Zeus in Epirus.

Covered in the poem are the Spanish match, the Gunpowder Plot, the murder of Thomas Overbury, and the assassination of Buckingham. The political criticisms in Dodona's Grove may have contributed to Howell's imprisonment in 1643.

In the poem, plants represent prominent persons. The British oak tree in Dodona's Grove represents the Stuarts.

== Impact ==
Historian Henry Hallam criticized the work harshly, calling it "clumsy", "unintelligible", "dull", and "an entire failure". Despite its shortcomings, it is speculated to have been an influence on James Harrington's The Commonwealth of Oceana. Bibliographer Albrecht von Haller was tricked into including Dodona's Grove in his Bibliotheca Botanica.
