= St Peter's Church, Birkby =

Church in Birkby, North Yorkshire, England

Coordinates: 54.4158°N 1.4906°W

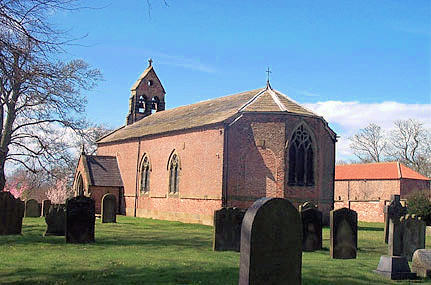
The church, in 2006

St Peter's Church is the parish church of Birkby, North Yorkshire, a village in England.

St Peter's Church was first built in the 12th century. It was demolished and rebuilt in 1776, and in 1872 the arched windows were replaced by Gothic windows, and a porch and bellcote were added. Two vestries were added in 1888 by C. Hodgson Fowler. It was Grade II listed in 1970.

The church is built of brick, with stone dressings, and a stone slate roof. It consists of a three-bay nave with south porch and a single-bay chancel. At the west end is a bellcote with two pointed-arched bell openings, and a round-headed arch above. The porch contains a doorway with a pointed arch and a chamfered surround, diagonal buttresses, and it has a coped gable with a cross. Inside, the oak benches date from the 17th century. A piece of an 11th-century cross shaft is set into the west wall, while a carved capital of about 1160 was found under the floor, having at some point served as a baptismal font.

== See also ==
- Listed buildings in Birkby, North Yorkshire
