= James Howell =

Welsh writer and historian (1594–1666)

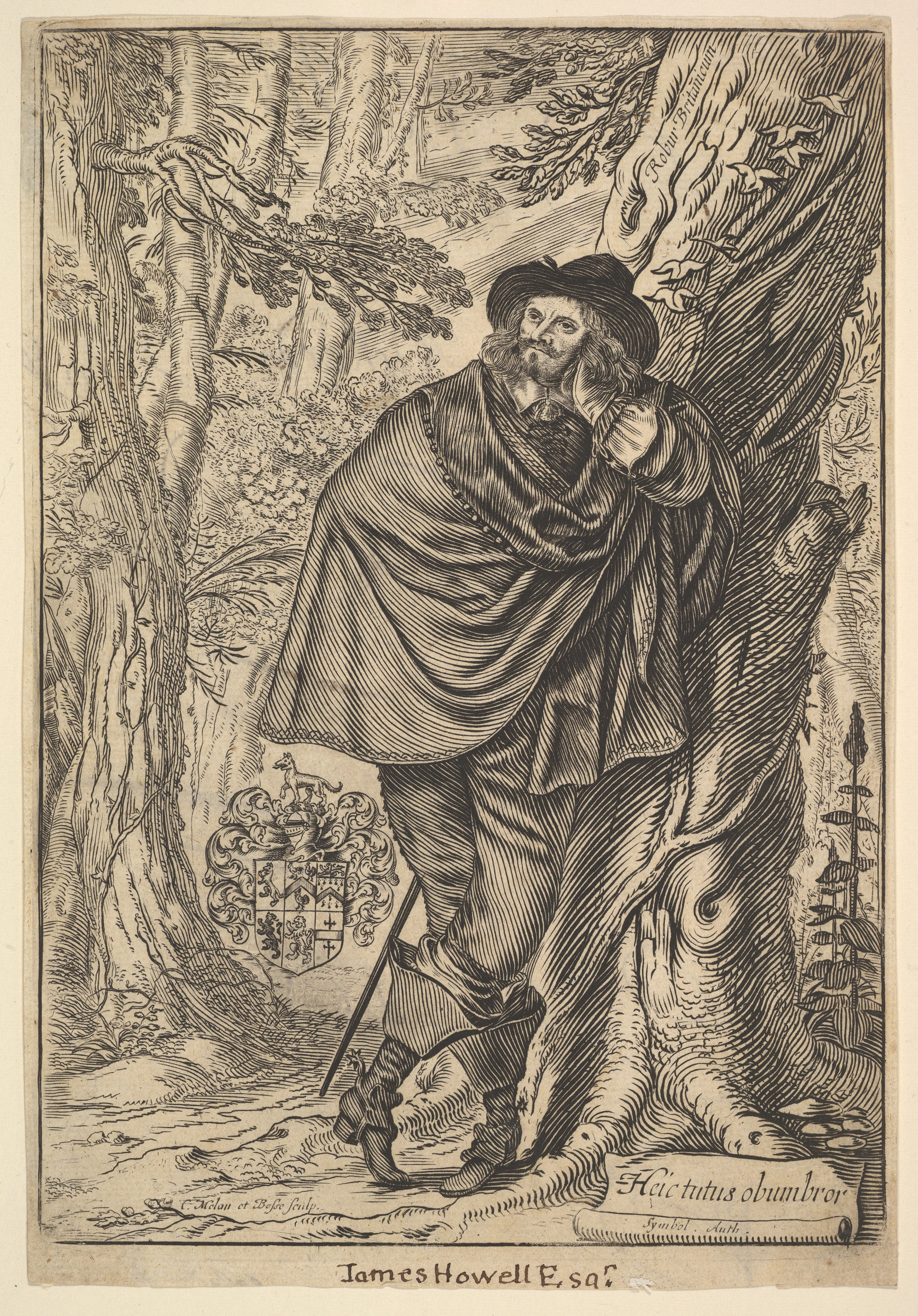
A 1641 engraving of Howell

James Howell (c. 1594 – c. 1666) was a Welsh writer and historian. The son of a Welsh clergyman, he was for much of his life in the shadow of his elder brother Thomas Howell, who became Lord Bishop of Bristol.

== Education ==
In 1613 he gained his B.A. from Jesus College, Oxford – he was to be elected to a fellowship at Jesus College in 1623, but he was never formally admitted and his place was taken by another in 1626. Until he was 13, he was schooled in Hereford. He went to Oxford at the age of 19.

== Career ==
After graduation, he had a variety of employments, as an administrator for a glass manufacturer, and in the often combined roles of secretary and instructor to several noble families. As factory agent and negotiator he traveled widely in Europe and learned to speak several languages, apparently with great facility. He also met and befriended numerous literary figures, among them Ben Jonson and Kenelm Digby. Paramount amongst his priorities was however royal, or at least aristocratic patronage.

On the eve of the English Civil War, he finally gained a secretaryship of the Privy Council, which according to one eminent critic, was "very close to the type of appointment that he had sought for 20 years". The conflict meant that he never took up the position, and at about the same time, he wrote his first book, or "maiden Fancy", Dodona's Grove, which represented the history of England and Europe through the allegorical framework of a typology of trees. He started to publish at this time of ferment although he was already well established as a writer of what we would know today as 'newsletters' but were then known as 'tracts' or 'pamphlets'.

He was a prolific writer, and he is among the first writers to earn his living solely from writing in the English language. A collection of his letters ran to several editions, published as Epistolae Ho-Elianae: Familiar Letters.

To lexicography Howell contributed his quadrilingual Lexicon Tetraglotton in 1660. This lexicon also contains a thematic dictionary in 52 sections, ranging from anatomy to cosmology. Howell's Proverbs, although separately printed, was bound and sold with his Lexicon Tetraglotton. John Worthington, writing in his Diary in August 1661, recommended the separate republication of the Proverbs with its collection of British (i.e. Welsh) proverbs because the Lexicon itself "is not so desirable".

Howell was imprisoned in Fleet Prison in 1643, ostensibly as an insolvent debtor, although his political criticisms in Dodona's Grove may have also played a part. Howell continued to write and publish from prison. He was released in 1651. He dedicated Some Sober Reflections (1656) to Oliver Cromwell, praising him for ending the Rump Parliament in 1653, obsequiously fawning over the Protector in the process, ending his dedication, "I rest in the lowliest posture of obedience."

At the Restoration of Charles II in 1660, Charles appointed Howell the Historiographer Royal, the first to hold that post.

In 1650, Howell revised and expanded Cotgrave and Sherwood's French and English dictionary of 1632, under the title A French-English Dictionary. He added a 21-page French grammar to the work in 1650, but the title page did not advertise this grammar until the 1660 edition; this grammar has often been mistakenly cited as a separate publication.

He wrote A New English Grammar with notes on travel in Spain and Portugal "for the service of Her Majesty", in which he proposed spelling reforms such as 'logique' to 'logic', 'warre' to 'war', 'sinne' to 'sin', 'toune' to 'town' and 'tru' to 'true', many of which are now in general use.

Some modern historians of formal English consider Howell's New English Grammar a work of foreign language teaching and the first work of its kind in the English language.

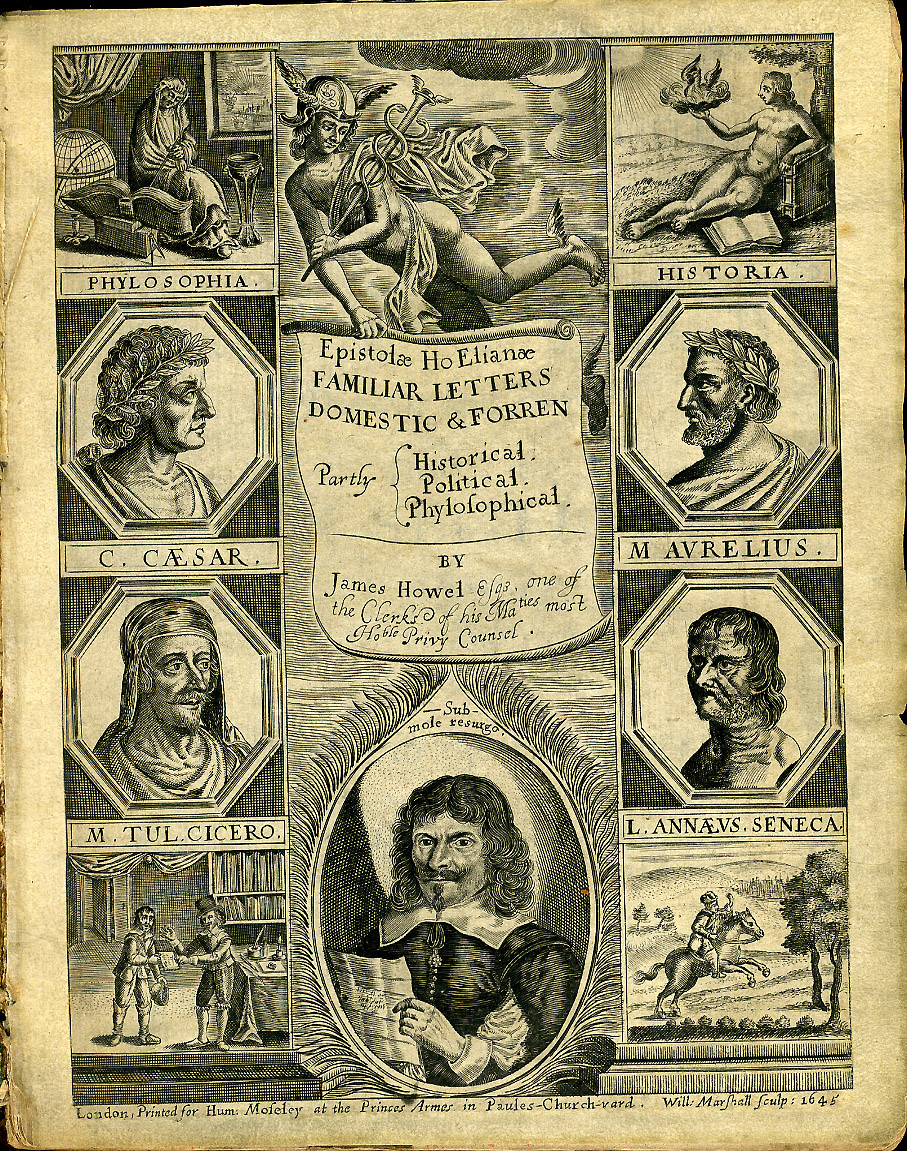
Engraved titlepage of the 1645 edition of James Howell's Epistolae Ho Elianae Familiar Letters Domestic & Forren, engraving by William Marshall.

Howell's Proverbs contains the famous saying: "All work and no play, makes Jack a dull boy".

== Principal literary works ==
- Dendrologia, Dodona's Grove, or the Vocall Forest (1640).
- England's Teares, for the Present Wars (1644; also addended to the 2nd edition of Dodona's Grove published in the same year).
- Epistolae Ho-Elianae: Familiar Letters Domestic and Forren (1645–1650).
- Instructions for Forraine Travell (1642).
- Louis XIII (1646).
- A Perfect Description of the Country of Scotland (1649).
- An Exact Historie of the Late Revolutions in Naples (1650) and its continuation The Second Part of Massaniello (1652), an English translation of Alessandro Giraffi's Le rivolutioni di Napoli (1647).
- S.P.Q.V.: A Survay of the Signorie of Venice (1651).
- The Vision, or, A Dialog between the Soul and the Bodie: Fancied in a Morning-dream (1651).
- A German Diet: Or, The Ballance of Europe (1653).
- Some Sober Inspections (1656).
- Londonopolis: An Historical Discourse or Perlustration of the City of London (1657).
- Paramoigraphy (Proverbs) (1659).
- Lexicon Tetraglotton (1660).
- A New English Grammar Prescribing Certain Rules as the Language will Bear for Foreigners to Learn English (1662).
- Discourse of Dunkirk (1664).
- Preheminence and Pedigree of Parliament (1677).
- Parley of Beasts.
- Translation: Beginning, Continuance and Decay of Estates (from French).
- Observations (Finett; edited by Howell).
- St. Paul's Late Progress.
- Perambulation of Spain and Portugal.
- The Last Will and Testament of the Late Renowned Cardinal Mazarini, Deceased February 27, 1660 together with Some Historical Remarques of His Life (translated by Howell).
- The Venice Looking Glass.

=== Literary criticism of Howell's works ===
- Daniel Woolf: Constancy and Ambition in the work of James Howell.
- Javier Escribano: Proverbios, Refránes Y Traducción (Lexicon Tetraglotton).
- Paul Seaward: (1988) A Restoration Publicist: James Howell and the Earl of Clarendon, 1661-6.
- W H Vann's Catalogue of Howell works (c. 1920).
- Sanchez Sederi English Grammar.

== Legacy ==
The memorial to James Howell in the Temple Church in London, for which he paid himself as mentioned in his will of 1666, was destroyed in World War II by the Blitz.

== Notes ==
| New post | English Historiographer Royal; 1660–1666 | Succeeded by John Dryden |
