= Robert Stephens (historian) =

Robert Stephens (1665–1732), who was appointed historiographer royal in 1727, was a public servant and historian. He was the first to publish much of Francis Bacon's private correspondence.

== Life ==
Born in 1665, Robert Stephens was the fourth son of Richard Stephens of the elder house of that name at Eastington in Gloucestershire, by his wife Anne, eldest daughter of Sir Hugh Cholmeley, bart. His first education was at Wotton school, whence he removed to Lincoln College, Oxford, matriculating on 19 May 1681, but he left the university without taking a degree. He was called to the bar at the Middle Temple in 1689, and was one of the founders of the Society of Antiquaries in 1717.

Being a relative of Robert Harley, Earl of Oxford, whose mother, Abigail, was daughter of Nathaniel Stephens of Eastington, he was preferred by him to be chief solicitor of the customs, in which employment he continued till 1726, when he was appointed to succeed Thomas Madox in the place of historiographer-royal. He died at Grovesend, near Thornbury, Gloucestershire, on 9 Nov. 1732, and was buried at Eastington, where a monument with an English inscription was erected to his memory by his widow (and first cousin), Mary Stephens, daughter of Sir Hugh Cholmeley, 4th Baronet.

== Work ==
Stephens began about 1690 to transcribe and collect unpublished "letters and memoirs" of Francis Bacon, chiefly in collections. The first result of his labours was his Letters of Sir Francis Bacon published in London in 1702. After this volume had appeared Harley "was pleased to put into my hands some neglected manuscripts and loose papers, to see whether any of the Lord Bacon's compositions lay concealed there that were fit to be published." His investigations induced Stephens to prepare another volume, Letters and Remains of the Lord Chancellor Bacon. The first 231 pages of this volume (it consists of 516), with a preface and introductory memoir, were sent to press by Stephens. The rest were selected from his papers by his friend John Locker, and the whole volume was edited by Stephens's widow.

Among Stephens's collection in the British Library (Addit. MS. 4269) is a catalogue of letters and papers connected with Bacon. Many of these documents cannot now be found, and a list of the missing papers is printed in Spedding, Ellis and Heath's edition of Bacon's Works, 1874, xiv. 590. It is possible that they are still in existence, and may yet be recovered. All the letters and papers described in Stephens's 'Catalogue' were most probably in the hands of Archbishop Tenison at Lambeth as late as December 1682.

== Notes ==
Preceded by Thomas Madox	English Historiographer Royal; 1727–1732	Succeeded by
