= St Mary's Church, South Cowton =

Listed church in North Yorkshire, England

Coordinates: 54.4186°N 1.5497°W

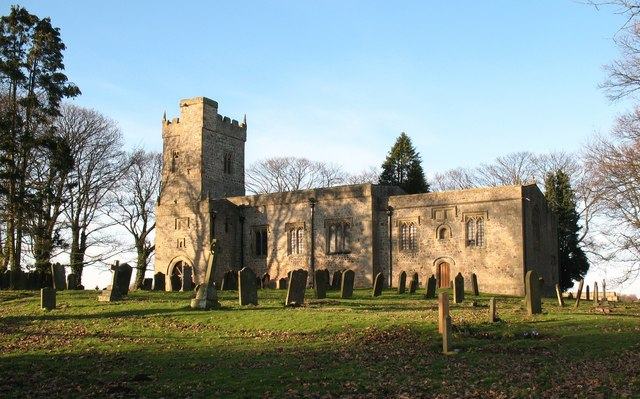
- St Mary's Church, South Cowton, from the south

- Location in North Yorkshire
- OS grid reference: NZ 293 026
- Location: South Cowton, North Yorkshire
- Country: England
- Denomination: Anglican
- Website: Churches Conservation Trust

Architecture
- Functional status: Redundant
- Heritage designation: Grade I
- Designated: 31 March 1970
- Architectural type: Church
- Style: Gothic
- Groundbreaking: 1450
- Completed: 1470

Specifications
- Materials: Sandstone, lead roof

St Mary's Church is a redundant Anglican church standing in open countryside in the former village of South Cowton, near Scotch Corner in North Yorkshire, England. It is recorded in the National Heritage List for England as a designated Grade I listed building, and is under the care of the Churches Conservation Trust.

== History ==
The church was built between 1450 and 1470 by Sir Richard Conyers, who also built South Cowton Castle to the south of the church. The village of South Cowton was destroyed by Sir Richard and its land cleared for agricultural use. The church was restored in 1883. St Mary's was vested in the Trust on 1 April 1988.

== Architecture ==
=== Exterior ===
St Mary's is constructed in rubble and sandstone ashlar, with a lead roof. Its plan consists of a three-bay nave with a two-storey south porch, a three-bay chancel with a northeast vestry, and a west tower. The tower is in Perpendicular style. It has a two-light, ogee-arched bell opening on each side, an embattled parapet with pinnacles, and a stair turret on the southeast corner. On the south wall of the nave are three windows, two with three lights and the middle one with two lights. In the central bay of the south wall of the chancel is a doorway over which are two panels bearing the arms of the Conyers and the Boynton families. On each side of the doorway, at a higher level, is a two-light window.

=== Interior ===
Internally there is a low-pitched tie-beam roof. The font is octagonal and dates from the 15th century. On the chancel arch is a painting, also from the 15th century, and from the same period are the choirstalls, the rood screen and alabaster effigies of Sir Christopher Boynton and his two wives. The porch has a barrel roof, over which is a room for the priest. On one of the choirstalls is a "two-faced" carving. There is a ring of three bells, one dated 1700 cast by Samuel I Smith, one by Edward I Seller cast in 1712, and the third by John Warner & Sons, dating from 1883.

== See also ==
- Grade I listed buildings in North Yorkshire (district)
- Listed buildings in South Cowton
- List of churches preserved by the Churches Conservation Trust in Northern England
