= East Cowton =

Village and civil parish in North Yorkshire, England

Coordinates: 54°25′22″N 1°31′28″W

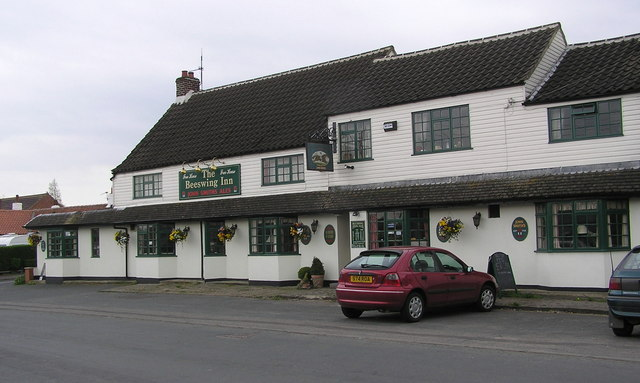
- The Beeswing Inn, East Cowton

- Location within North Yorkshire
- Population: 533 (2011 census)
- OS grid reference: NZ308033
  - London: 209 mi (336 km) SE
- Unitary authority: North Yorkshire
- Ceremonial county: North Yorkshire
- Region: Yorkshire and the Humber
- Country: England
- Sovereign state: United Kingdom
- Post town: NORTHALLERTON
- Postcode district: DL7
- Dialling code: 01325
- Police: North Yorkshire
- Fire: North Yorkshire
- Ambulance: Yorkshire
- UK Parliament: Richmond and Northallerton

East Cowton is a village and civil parish in the county of North Yorkshire, England. It is 7 miles (11 km) north west of the county town of Northallerton.

== History ==
The village is mentioned twice in the Domesday Book as Cottune in the Allerton Hundred. At the time of the Norman Conquest the lands of the manor were split between Earl Edwin and a small part to Thorkil. After 1086 the larger part of the manor lands were taken by the Crown and the smaller area granted to Landric of Hornby. The manor was granted by the Crown to the lords of Richmond, notably to Conan, the seneschal of the lord of Richmond. From 1324 to 1548, the manor was held by Clervaux family of Croft. Thereafter it was conveyed to the Dakyns family until 1622 when it was conveyed to Sir Henry Anderson. In 1662 the manor was sold to Thomas Bruce, 1st Earl of Elgin who conveyed it five years later to John Belasyse, 1st Baron Belasyse, whose daughter married Sir John Webb of Great Canford in Dorset and Odstock in Wilts whose heirs held it into the twentieth century.

The etymology of the village name is a combination of the Old English words of cū and tūn meaning Cow farm. The East is to distinguish it from other Cowton's in the area. The village used to be known as "Long Cowton" and before that "Magna Cowton".

== Demography ==
Population
Year	1801	1811	1821	1831	1841	1851	1881	1891	1901	1911	1921	1931	1951	1961	2001	2011
Total	323	302	338	374	454	461	387	394	351	347	336	332	349	337	561	533

=== 2001 Census ===
According to the 2001 UK Census, the parish was 49.9% male and 50.1% female of the total population of 561. The religious make-up was 84% Christian with the rest stating no religion. The ethnic distribution was 99.4% White with a small Mixed Ethnic minority. There were 233 dwellings.

=== 2011 Census ===
According to the 2011 UK Census, the parish had a total population of 533 with 49.7% male and 50.3% female. The religious make-up was 75.6% Christian, a small minority of Sikh, Buddhist and Muslim with the rest stating no religion. The ethnic distribution was 98.9% White with a small Mixed Ethnic minority. There were 241 dwellings.

== Geography and governance ==
The village lies just to the west of the East Coast Main Line and was once served by Cowton railway station about half a mile away. The station building and stationmaster's house is a Grade II listed building. It lies between the River Wiske and its tributary, The Stell. The minor road between the A167 and B1263 runs through the village. The villages of Birkby, Great Smeaton, Little Smeaton and North Cowton all lie within 2.5 miles (4.0 km) of the village.

The village lies within the Richmond and Northallerton UK Parliament constituency. From 1974 to 2023 it was part of the Hambleton District, it is now administered by the unitary North Yorkshire Council.

== Community ==
The village school is called East Cowton Church of England Primary School. It has around 40 pupils. It is within the catchment area of Northallerton School for secondary education to the age of eighteen.

The village post office also functions as the village shop. The village public house is called The Beeswing Inn, it is named after the northern racehorse Beeswing whose most notable victory was the 1842 Ascot Gold Cup. She won an incredible 51 out of the 64 races that she entered. Of the 57 races in which she finished Beeswing only finished lower than 2nd place on one occasion. The village is served by the No 72 bus, which runs between Darlington and Northallerton.

There is also a local cricket club.

== Religion ==
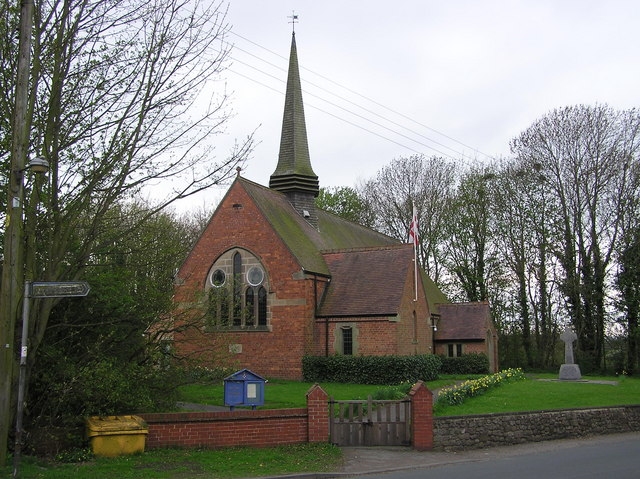
All Saints' Church

All Saints' Church, East Cowton is to the west of the village. A Grade II listed building, it is a red-brick structure erected in 1910. There is evidence of a 13th-century church in the village dedicated to St Mary, which fell into disrepair. Cowton Cemetery is about half a mile west of the village on the road towards North Cowton on the site of the old church. The Primitive Methodists built a chapel, no longer in use, in 1840.

== See also ==
- Listed buildings in East Cowton
- North Cowton
- South Cowton
