= Birkby, North Yorkshire =

Village and civil parish in North Yorkshire, England

Coordinates: 54°24′54″N 1°29′27″W

Birkby
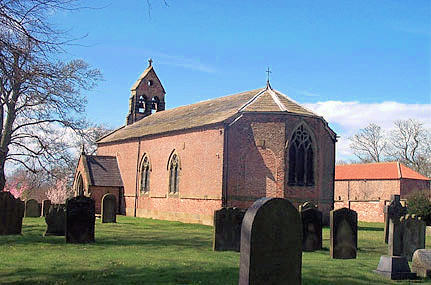
- St Peter's Church, Birkby

- Location within North Yorkshire
- Population: 40
- OS grid reference: NZ332023
- Unitary authority: North Yorkshire
- Ceremonial county: North Yorkshire
- Region: Yorkshire and the Humber
- Country: England
- Sovereign state: United Kingdom
- Post town: NORTHALLERTON
- Postcode district: DL7 0
- Dialling code: 01609
- Police: North Yorkshire
- Fire: North Yorkshire
- Ambulance: Yorkshire
- UK Parliament: Richmond and Northallerton

Birkby is a village and civil parish about 6 miles north of the county town of Northallerton in the county of North Yorkshire, England. The population of the parish was estimated at 40 in 2016.

== Etymology ==
The name of the village, first recorded in the Domesday Book of 1086 as Bretebi, is derived from the Old Norse Breta býr, meaning "village of Britons".

== History ==
The British inhabitants encountered by the Vikings may have descended from Britons pushed back here by the advancing English, or they may have come to Yorkshire from the Lake District with Viking settlers from there. An alternative etymology is a combination of an Old Norse personal name Bretar and the suffix '-by' to give the meaning Bretar's farm.

At the time of the Norman invasion the manor was the possession of Earl Edwin, but was subsequently taken by the Crown. The manor followed the descent of the lord of Northallerton, but a mesne lordship was granted to Henry de Farlington. By 1316 the manor was in the possession of John de Lisle and soon after entered the holdings of the Scrope family. By the middle of the 16th century, the manor had passed to the Foljambe family and thence by marriages to the Grimston's, who were still in possession of the titles in 1821.

There are the foundations of a medieval settlement opposite the rectory near Hill Top Farm that shows the outline of associated fields that may have been moated with fishponds.

== Governance ==
The village lies within the Richmond and Northallerton UK Parliament constituency. From 1974 to 2023 it was part of the Hambleton District, it is now administered by the unitary North Yorkshire Council.

== Geography ==
The village lies very close to the East Coast Main Line and on a minor road that runs between East Cowton and the A167. The nearest settlements to Birkby are Little Smeaton, 1.2 miles (1.9 km) to the north-east, Hutton Bonville 1.5 miles (2.4 km) to the south-east and East Cowton 1.5 miles (2.4 km) to the north-west.

== Religion ==
St Peter's Church, Birkby, dates from 1776. During some 19th-century renovation work the bases of two Norman columns were discovered under the floor of the chancel and others were found under the nave. They had seemed to form part of a much earlier and more ornate building than the one that now occupies the site. Part of the shaft of a Saxon cross was also unearthed, and is now built into the wall of the west end. Adjacent to the church is a rectory.

== See also ==
- Listed buildings in Birkby, North Yorkshire
