= Danby Wiske Church =

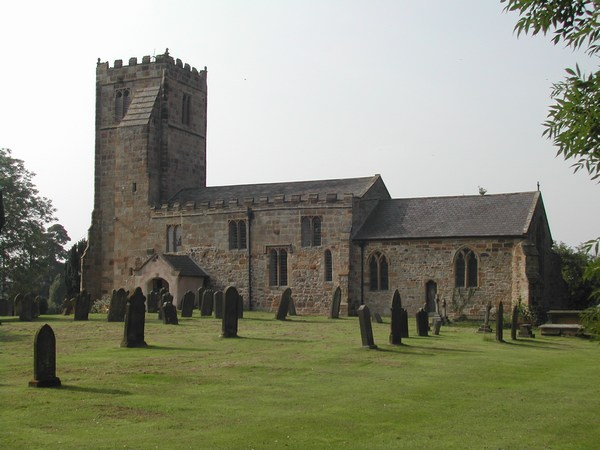

- Location within North Yorkshire
- 54°22′46″N 1°28′52″W

Danby Wiske Church is the parish church of Danby Wiske, a village in North Yorkshire, in England.

The church was built in the early 12th century, from which period the south doorway and lower part of the south wall survive. There were major alterations in the early 14th century, with a new chancel and north aisle added. The tower was built in the 15th century, and the porch was added in the 18th century. The church was grade I listed in 1970. It is not known to which saint the church was dedicated.

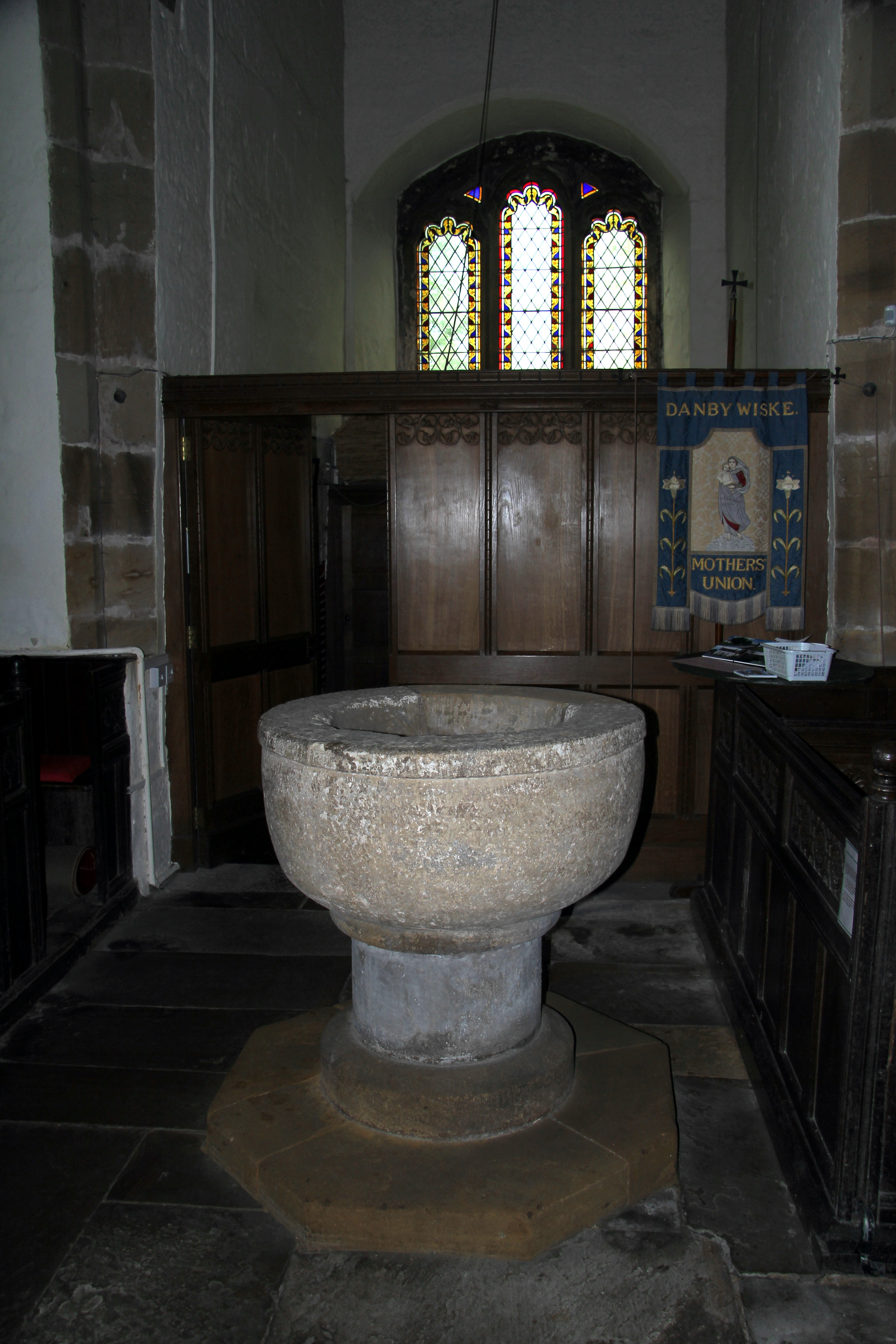
The font

The church is built of sandstone with roofs of Welsh and Westmorland slate, and consists of a nave with a clerestory, a north aisle, a south porch, a chancel and a west tower. The tower has diagonal buttresses, a stair tower with slit windows, two-light bell openings, and an embattled parapet. The nave also has an embattled parapet. The porch is gabled, and the doorway is Norman, with a tympanum containing three carved figures in long robes.

Inside the church, the font is early Norman and has a large bowl. There is a 14th-century effigy of the widow of Brian Fitz Alan of Bedale. The aumbry and piscina are also 14th century. The stalls have some reused Jacobean panelling.

== See also ==
- Grade I listed buildings in North Yorkshire (district)
- Listed buildings in Danby Wiske with Lazenby
