= Lazenby Hall =

House in Danby Wiske, North Yorkshire, England

Coordinates: 54°22′52″N 1°28′44″W

Lazenby Hall is a historic building near Danby Wiske, a village in North Yorkshire, in England.

The house was built for Henry Carey, some time between 1625 and 1661. After his death, it was leased out, and some of the internal plasterwork dates from this period, with one ceiling being dated 1680. There were some alterations in the late 19th and 20th centuries, mostly to the windows. The building was grade II* listed in 1953. The building is described by Tim Mowl and Brian Earnshaw as "attractively brash and truly Artisan", using motifs from classical architecture in combinations not consistent with any order of architecture.

The house is built of stone, with a chamfered floor band, and a stone slate roof with chamfered coping and shaped kneelers. There are two storeys and attics, and a main front of five bays, flanked by projecting wings two bays wide and three bays deep. In the centre is a doorway flanked by Doric half-shafts on a panelled plinth with a pulvinated frieze and a dentilled cornice. The windows are double-chamfered mullioned and transomed, divided by Doric pilasters under a continuous cornice, some of which have been replaced by sashes. The middle bay is flanked by Ionic half-shafts on panelled plinths with dosserets above.

== See also ==
- Grade II* listed buildings in North Yorkshire (district)
- Listed buildings in Danby Wiske with Lazenby
