= Northallerton School =

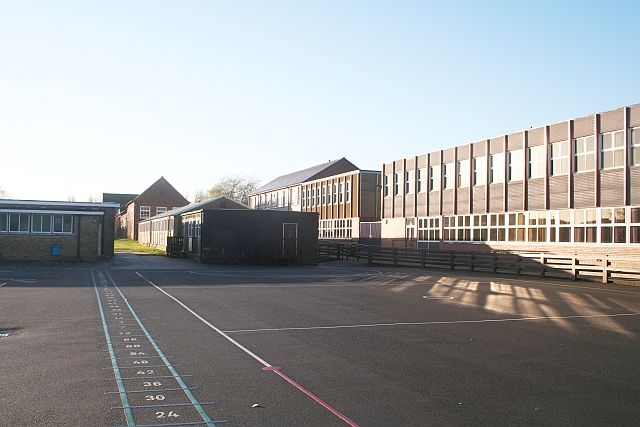

Location
- Grammar School Lane; Northallerton, North Yorkshire, DL6 1DD. England
- Coordinates: 54.33597°N 1.43025°W

Information
- Type: Academy
- Mottoes: Ex opera felicitas (From work happiness); Being the best we can be
- Established: 1323; 703 years ago
- Local authority: North Yorkshire Council
- Trust: Areté Learning Trust
- Department for Education URN: 146969 Tables
- Ofsted: Reports
- Head teacher: K. Broom
- Gender: Coeducational
- Age: 11 to 18
- Enrolment: 1,034
- Colours: Black and White
- Website: http://www.northallertonschool.org.uk/

Northallerton School is a coeducational comprehensive secondary school and sixth form with academy status, located in Northallerton, North Yorkshire, England. The school is located over two sites on Brompton Road and Grammar School Lane.

== History ==
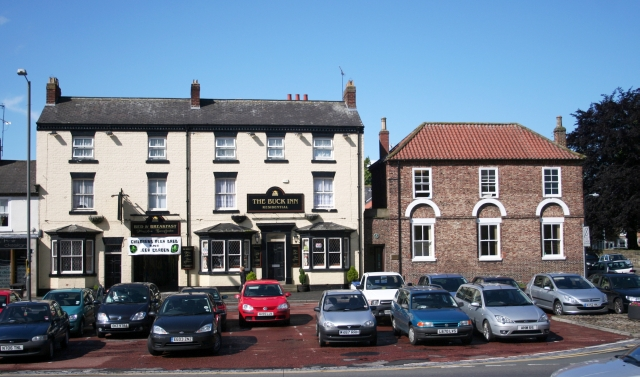
The old grammar school building from 1776 until 1909 on the right

The school was founded in 1322/1323, and in its early history it was known as Northallerton Free School. Parts of the old school building can be seen adjacent to All Saints' Church near the north end of Northallerton High Street. The Grammar School moved to the Grammar School Lane site in 1909.

=== Selective school ===
In the 1940s the then Northallerton Grammar School had around 250 boys and girls, and 450 by 1970. It was administered by the North Riding Education Committee. At the outset of the Second World War it provided space for evacuee children from Sunderland for some months.

In the 1950s there was a two-form entry. The first year forms (unstreamed) were 1A and 1 Alpha, and forms 2 to 5 were streamed (2A/2B to 5A/5B) followed by a Lower Sixth and an Upper Sixth. Admission was by the Eleven plus exam with a further admission of a very small number by transfer from the Allertonshire School at the beginning of the third form. There were two houses for sports, Wensley (green) and Cleveland (blue).

=== Comprehensive ===
In 1973 it became a comprehensive but maintained the name Northallerton Grammar School and was administered by the North Yorkshire local authority. As a comprehensive it always had a 14–18 age range ie an upper school. At the same time the Allertonshire School was formed from the town's two secondary modern schools.

In 1994 the school governors decided to change the name from Grammar School to College in order to reflect the reality of their service to the whole community. In 2009 the school became federated with Risedale Sports and Community College in Catterick.

In 2015 Northallerton College merged with Allertonshire School to form Northallerton School. The school still operates over both of the former school sites, with the lower school on Brompton Road (the old Allertonshire School site) due to be renovated over two years from 2019 and the senior school and sixth form on Grammar School Lane (the old Northallerton College site).

In 2018, 2 pupils attending the school were arrested for planning to launch an attack on the school. The pair were arrested after the police were informed. In May 2018, the pair were found guilty of conspiracy to murder.

In April 2018, a new headteacher, Chris Drew, was appointed in light of the school being designated as "failing" by Ofsted in an earlier report. Chris Drew was replaced in September 2019 by Vicki Rahn. Soon after Ms Rahn's appointment, the school secured £8.7 million from the Department of Education to redevelop the old Allertonshire site on Brompton Road, Northallerton. The refurbished site, alongside the newly constructed sixth form centre, opened to students in September 2021.

=== Academy ===
Previously a community school administered by North Yorkshire County Council, in September 2019 Northallerton School converted to academy status. The school is now sponsored by the Areté Learning Trust.

== Admissions ==
Northallerton School receives pupils from the town of Northallerton and from a number of primary schools in surrounding villages.

== Academic performance ==
It gets GCSE results above average and A-level results at the England average.

== Notable former pupils ==
- Paul Tonkinson, TV presenter

=== Northallerton Grammar School ===
- Robert Allison, Vice-Chancellor and President, Loughborough University
- Thomas Byerley, journalist
- Thomas Burnet, theologian
- George Hickes, theologian
- Alan Hinkes, mountaineer
- John Kettlewell, clergyman
- Dr William Palliser, archbishop of Cashel
- John Radcliffe, physician to William of Orange
- Thomas Rymer, Historiographer Royal

== See also ==
- List of the oldest schools in the United Kingdom
