= Pepper Arden =

Building in South Cowton, North Yorkshire, England

Coordinates: 54°24′41″N 1°32′40″W

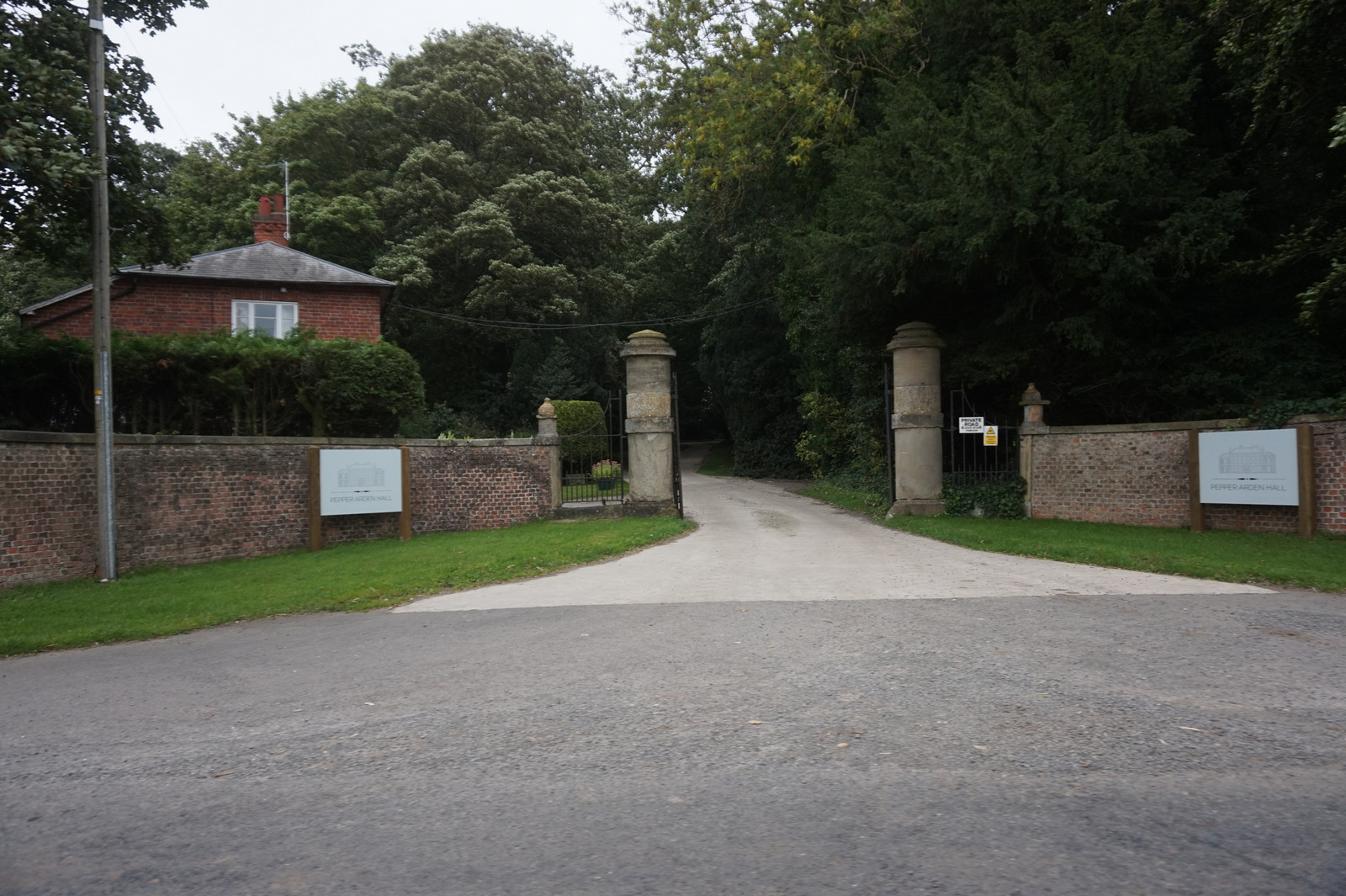
Entrance to the estate, in 2020

Pepper Arden is a historic building in South Cowton, a village in North Yorkshire, in England.

The first house on the estate, "Pepper Hall", was built in or before the 17th century. A house was built on a new site in the early 18th century, and the old house was replaced by Home Farm. A rear wing was added to the house in about 1850, then a side block and bays were added in about 1870, perhaps to a design by William Eden Nesfield. The building was grade II listed in 1953.

The house is built of red brick, with rendering, floor bands, a cornice, a balustraded parapet with ball finials, and a Welsh slate roof. The main block has three storeys and seven bays, it is flanked by canted two-storey bays, to the left is a wing with two storeys and two bays, and beyond that is a service wing. On the centre of the main block is a Doric porch with a frieze, a cornice with mutules, and a blocking course, and a doorway with a fanlight. Above it is a window with a segmental pediment, and the other windows are sashes with keystones, double in the lower two floors. The two front rooms have 19th-century plaster ceillings.

A water tower was added in the mid or late 19th century, and it is also grade II listed. It is built of red brick, with yellow brick banding, and a pyramidal stone slate roof with a weathervane. It has a plinth and giant angle pilasters flanking round-arched recessed panels. The tower contains a segmental-arched doorway, above which is a stepped and cogged cornice, a stone band and a tripartite window, and a cornice with consoles. In 2025, planning permission was granted to convert it into a house.

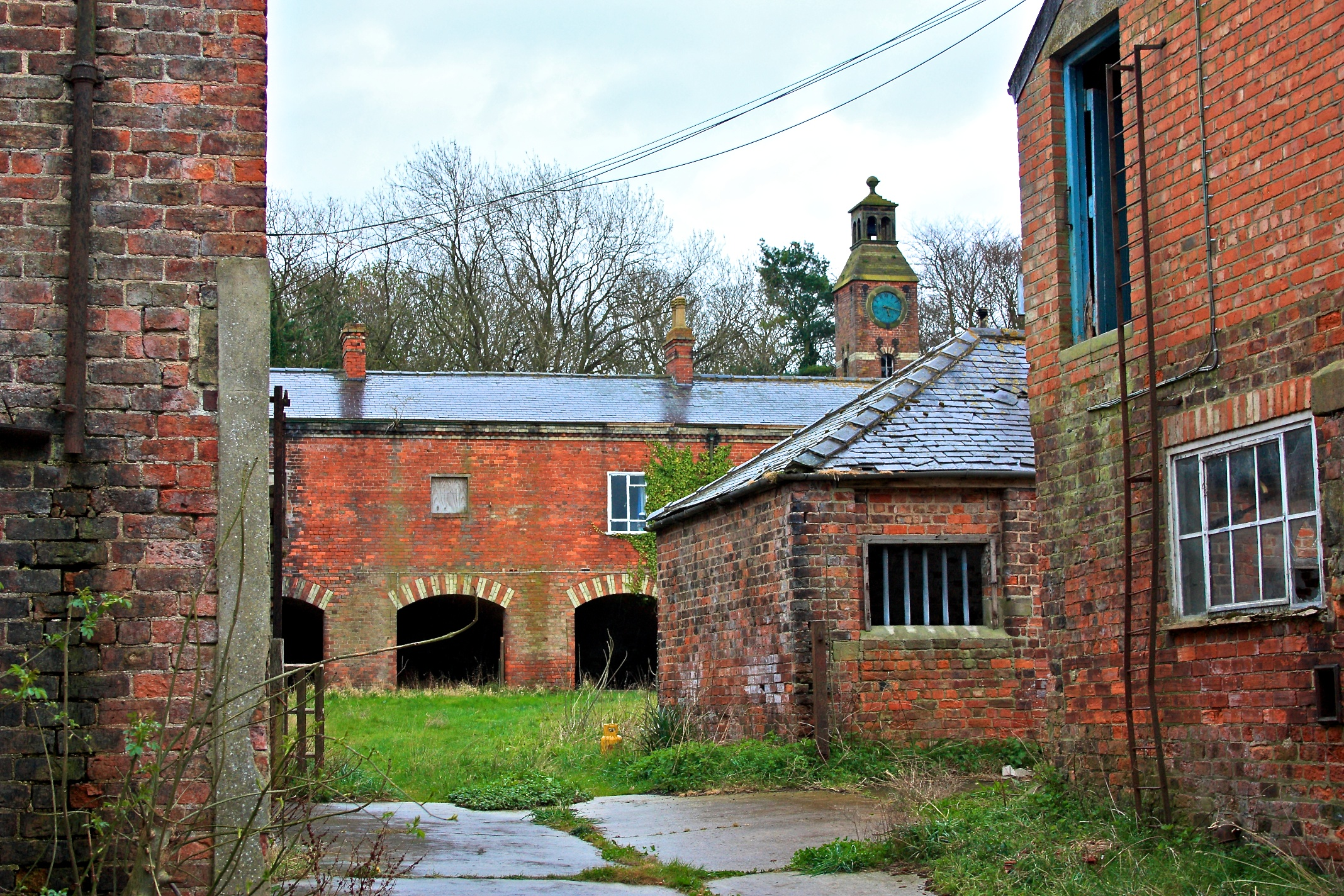
The stables

The stable buildings were built in the late 19th century and are grade II listed. They are built of red brick, with banding in yellow brick, stone dressings and a Welsh slate roof. They surround a square courtyard and have a central range with two storeys and a clock tower. The entrance front has one storey and 15 bays, and contains a central carriage entrance with an architrave and a keystone. This is flanked by Tuscan columns on a plinth, with a frieze and a cornice, a keystone and paterae, above which is a pediment, The central range has two storeys and 15 bays, the middle bay projecting and containing a round-arched doorway, above which is an arched window with an open pediment. In the centre is a clock tower with a pyramidal roof and a square stone bellcote.

== See also ==
- Listed buildings in South Cowton
