= Robert Cowton =

Robert Cowton (fl. 1300) was a Franciscan theologian active at the University of Oxford early in the fourteenth century. He was a follower of Henry of Ghent, and in the Augustinian tradition. He was familiar with the doctrines of Duns Scotus and Thomas Aquinas, and attempted a synthesis of them.

He entered the Franciscan Order before age 13. He presented a commentary on the Sentences of Peter Lombard around 1310. Later, in an abbreviated form, this became a standard textbook of theology. The work was criticised by Thomas Sutton.
