= Thomas Meriton =

17th-century English dramatist

Thomas Meriton (born 1638) was an English dramatist who published two plays in 1658.

== Life ==
He was the second son of Thomas Meriton of Castle Leavington, Yorkshire, and Grace, daughter of Francis Wright of Bolton-on-Swale. He was grandson of George Meriton, dean of York, and younger brother of George Meriton, a legal writer. He was educated at a private school at Danby Wiske, and admitted at the unusual age of 24 a sizar of St John's College, Cambridge in 1662. He obtained a BA in 1665 and an MA in 1669.

He was ordained in 1669, and became rector of Normanton, Lincolnshire. His year of death is not known.

== Publications ==
Meriton published two plays in 1658, Love and War, a Tragedy, dedicated to his brother George, and The Wandering Lover, a Tragy-Comedie, which, according to the title-page, had been "acted severall times privately at sundry places by the Author and his friends, with great applause." In the dedication to Francis Wright he mentions that he had also written The Severall Affairs, a Comedy, and The Chast Virgin, a Romance, but that they were only shown to some private friends.

"Happy certainly", said the contemporary drama critic Gerard Langbaine, "were those men who were not reckoned in the number of his friends." Langbaine described him as "certainly the meanest Dramatick writer that ever England produc'd".
