= Historiographer Royal (England) =

Court appointment in England

Historiographer Royal, as a court appointment in England, existed between 1661 and 1837; it was bestowed upon an historian, antiquary or writer who was under the official patronage of the royal court. The role was essentially that of a historian and was not exclusive to the modern science of historiography, which is the study of historians' methods and conclusions.

== History ==
In England the office of Historiographer Royal was created by King Charles II to honour the prolific writer James Howell. It came with an annual salary of £200 and a butt of sack. Earlier, Bernard Andreas had fulfilled a similar role in the court of King Henry VII.

Howell was followed in the office first by John Dryden and then Thomas Shadwell, both of whom were concurrently appointed Poet Laureate; as a result the salary was increased to £300 a year. When Shadwell died in 1692, the appointments were split: the Historiographer's salary reverted to £200, while the butt of sack went to the Poet Laureate (along with the remaining £100).

At first, the Historiographer was appointed by Letters Patent; but from 1692 the appointment was made by warrant of the Lord Chamberlain.

Jonathan Swift, who was angling for the appointment at the time, wrote in 1714 that "it is necessary, for the honour of the Queen, and in justice to her servants, that some able hand should be immediately employed to write the history of her majesty's reign, that the truth of things may be transmitted to future ages, and bear down the falsehood of malicious pens". In reality, however, there were few duties or responsibilities attached to the appointment, and it mostly served as a mark of patronage. In 1782, in common with other sinecures, the post of Historiographer in England was suppressed; however it was revived in the early 19th century. It lapsed on the accession of Queen Victoria; however G. P. R. James (the last holder) was not deprived of the office and continued to be referred to as Historiographer Royal in later years.

== List of Historiographers Royal in England ==
Holders of the office included:

- 1661–1666: James Howell
- 1670–1689: John Dryden, simultaneously also poet laureate
- 1689–1692: Thomas Shadwell, simultaneously also poet laureate
- 1692–1714: Thomas Rymer
- 1714–1727: Thomas Madox
- 1727–1737: Robert Stephens
- 1732-1755: Jenkin Thomas Philipps
- 1755-1782: Richard Stonehewer
- 1782-?: Vacant
- By 1798: L. Dutens
- 1812–1821: J. S. Clarke
- 1821–1826: C. R. Sumner
- 1826-1830: R. Gooch
- 1830–1837: Vacant
- 1837: G. P. R. James

== See also ==
- Historiographer Royal (Scotland), created 1681 and still extant
- Historiographer Royal (Sweden)
