= Cowton railway station =

Disused railway station in North Yorkshire, England

Cowton
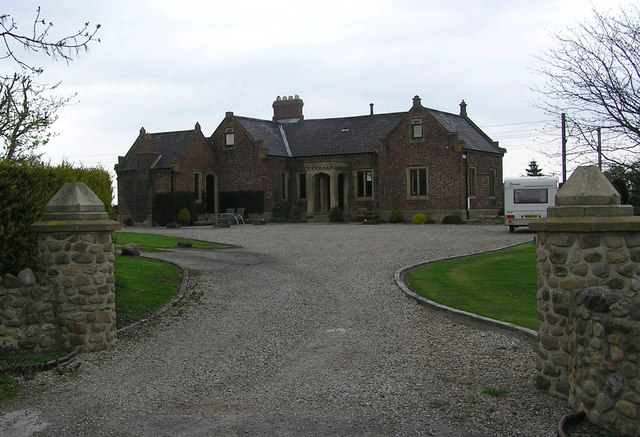
- Cowton Station

General information
- Location: East Cowton, North Yorkshire; England
- Coordinates: 54.428545°N 1.510340°W
- Grid reference: NZ318037
- Platforms: 2

Other information
- Status: Disused

History
- Original company: Great North of England Railway
- Pre-grouping: North Eastern Railway
- Post-grouping: London and North Eastern Railway

Key dates
- 31 March 1841: Opened
- 15 September 1958: Closed
Location

Cowton railway station is a disused station on the East Coast Main Line, it is situated in North Yorkshire, England. The station is situated around 1/2 mile (0.8 km) east of the village of East Cowton.

Several of the railway buildings have survived the closure of the station and were Grade II listed in 1987. They are presently used as residential properties.

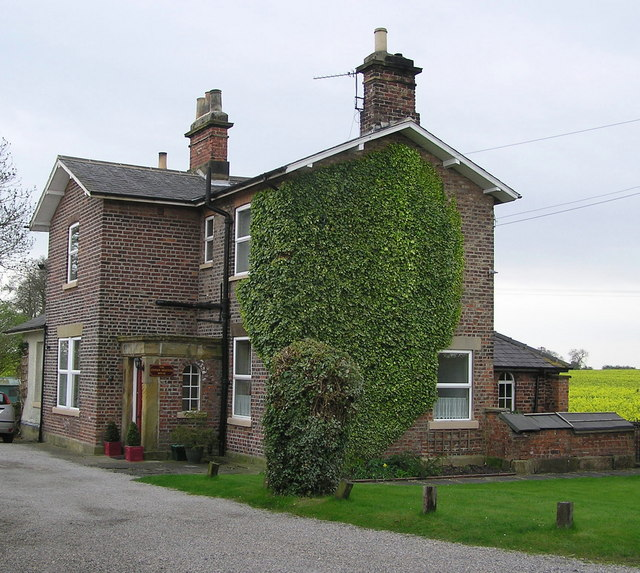
Station masters House

== Station buildings ==
The station was opened by the Great North of England Railway on 31 March 1841. The station buildings and station master's house (which now identifies as a dwelling) were designed by Benjamin Green in a Jacobethan style. It is the oldest surviving of Green's stations, and the only survivor of the Great North of England Railway's wayside stations.

== See also ==
- List of closed railway stations in Britain
- Listed buildings in East Cowton

Preceding station	Historical railways	Following station
Danby Wiske; Line open, station closed	North Eastern Railway; East Coast Main Line	Eryholme; Line open, station closed
