= South Cowton Castle =

15th-century castle in North Yorkshire, England

- Cowton Castle
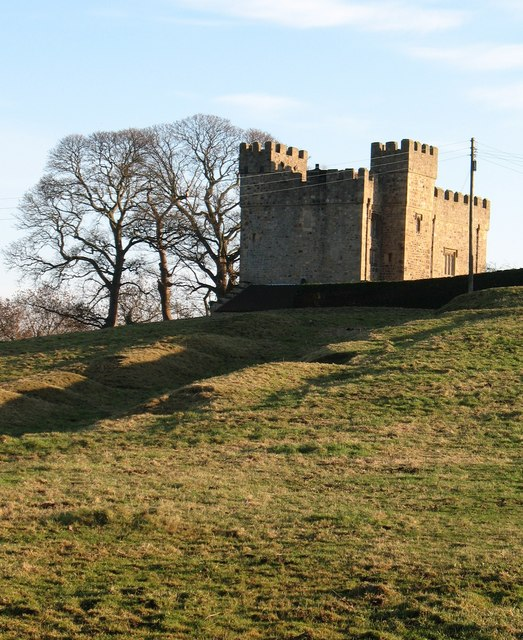
- South Cowton Castle viewed from the north-east
- Interactive map of the South Cowton Castle area

General information
- Type: Tower house / Fortified manor house
- Architectural style: Late Medieval
- Location: South Cowton, England
- Coordinates: 54.4158°N 1.5471°W
- Completed: c. 1470
- Client: Sir Richard Conyers
- Owner: Private (farmhouse)

Technical details
- Material: Rubblestone with ashlar dressings

Design and construction
- Architect: Sir Richard Conyers

Listed Building – Grade I
- Designated: 29 January 1953
- Reference no.: 1294712

Scheduled monument
- Designated: 5 September 1958
- Reference no.: 1015992

South Cowton Castle (historically known as Cowton Castle) is a 15th-century tower house and Grade I listed building located in the parish of South Cowton, near Northallerton in North Yorkshire, England. Built around 1470 by Sir Richard Conyers, the heavily fortified country house stands on a low ridge overlooking the earthwork remains of the deserted medieval village of South Cowton.

Constructed during the Wars of the Roses, the castle reflects the heightened security needs of local landowning gentry during periods of regional unrest. Today, the castle is preserved as a private farmhouse and is closed to the general public.

== History ==
=== Construction and the Wars of the Roses ===
The manor of South Cowton was held in the early 15th century by the Neville family of Middleham Castle. In 1462, the estate was leased to Richard Pigot, a legal councillor to Richard Neville, 16th Earl of Warwick (the "Kingmaker") and later to Richard, Duke of Gloucester.

Around 1470, Sir Richard Conyers constructed the present fortified dwelling. Conyers was a prominent regional figure who was granted an annuity by King Richard III for services rendered to the Crown during the dynastic conflicts of the Wars of the Roses. Conyers also rebuilt the neighboring Church of St Mary and constructed a stone causeway linking the castle to the churchyard.

=== Later ownership ===
In the 16th century, the castle passed by marriage to the Bowes family of Streatlam Castle. Sir George Bowes (1527–1580), who served as Provost Marshal to Queen Elizabeth I and played a key role in suppressing the Rising of the North in 1569, resided at South Cowton until his death. The Bowes family retained ownership of the castle and surrounding estate until 1605.

=== Desertion of the village ===
The construction of the castle coincided with the decline and eventual abandonment of the adjacent medieval settlement of South Cowton. While 14th-century taxation records show a populated farming community, emparkment, pasture conversion, and regional displacement during the 15th and 16th centuries reduced the village to a series of deserted earthworks. The castle, church, and outbuildings became the sole surviving structures on the landscape.

In the 19th century, the castle was altered for agricultural use. Following a partial roof collapse in 1979, the building underwent extensive structural repairs between 1980 and 1982, including the rebuilding of the parapets on the south-west tower.

== Architecture ==
South Cowton Castle is a rare surviving example of a late medieval fortified tower house built by a private knight rather than the high nobility. Constructed of local rubblestone with ashlar dressings, it features a rectangular central block rising three storeys, flanked by two diagonally opposite four-storey towers at the north-east and south-west corners.

=== Exterior ===
The North-East elevation functions as the principal entrance façade. It features a four-centred arched doorway under a two-light plate-traceried overlight and protective hoodmould. Windows on the ground and upper floors feature chamfered surrounds, two-shouldered arches, and single-light openings illuminating the internal spiral staircase. A carved stone heraldic shield panel is set between the first and second floors.

The corner towers retain projecting embattled parapets supported by corbels, designed for defensibility and visual dominance over the surrounding terrain.

=== Interior ===
The interior layout preserves its original medieval circulation pattern. The north-east tower contains a continuous stone spiral staircase providing access to all four levels. The ground floor originally served as secure storage and domestic utility areas, while the upper floors accommodated the principal hall, private solar chambers, and residential lodgings for the Conyers family.

== Associated monuments ==
The ground immediately south and west of the castle forms a Scheduled Monument (List Entry 1015992). Earthworks include sunken hollow ways, building platforms (tofts and crofts), field systems displaying ridge and furrow patterns, and a medieval fishpond measuring 32 by 20 metres (105 ft × 66 ft).

The Church of St Mary is located a short distance north-west of the castle, this Grade I listed 15th-century parish church contains three medieval alabaster effigies attributed to Sir Richard Conyers (d. 1502) and his two wives, Alice Wycliffe and Elizabeth Boynton.

== Cultural history and folklore ==
=== The Enclosure and Local Legend ===
The rapid decline of the village of South Cowton following the construction of the castle around 1470 gave rise to long-standing local traditions. Sir Richard Conyers was heavily criticized in local memory for enclosing common arable fields into private sheep pasture, driving out the tenant population.

According to Richmondshire folklore, the ghost of a spectral black hound (a Barghest) haunts the ancient hollow way connecting the castle to the church yard, said to be a guardian spirit watching over the site of the erased village.

== Modern conservation and archaeological survey ==
=== 1979 Collapse and Restoration ===
By the late 20th century, the castle had suffered severe decay while continuing to function as an agricultural store. In 1979, a major internal collapse destroyed sections of the roof and timber flooring within the south-west tower.

Between 1980 and 1982, the Department of the Environment initiated an emergency restoration project. The work stabilized the outer ashlar masonry, rebuilt the damaged embattled parapets, and installed a protective roofing system to secure the envelope of the building.

=== Archaeological Findings ===
Topographical and earthwork surveys conducted by English Heritage identified the precise footprint of the abandoned settlement surrounding the castle. The survey recorded two clear hollow ways (former main streets), building platforms for at least twenty medieval houses, and evidence of a complex drainage network feeding a central fishpond to the south-west of the castle walls.

== See also ==
- Grade I listed buildings in North Yorkshire (district)
- Listed buildings in South Cowton
