= South Cowton =

Village and civil parish in North Yorkshire, England

Coordinates: 54.4146°N 1.5503°W

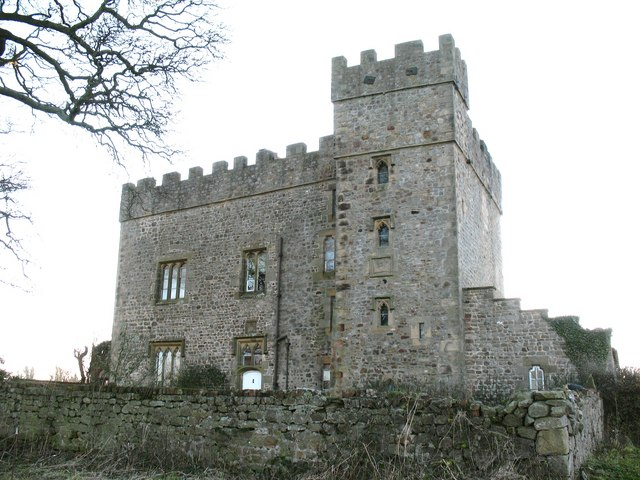
- South Cowton Castle

- Location within North Yorkshire
- Population: 188 (2011 census)
- OS grid reference: NZ292022
- Civil parish: South Cowton
- Unitary authority: North Yorkshire
- Ceremonial county: North Yorkshire
- Region: Yorkshire and the Humber
- Country: England
- Sovereign state: United Kingdom
- Post town: NORTHALLERTON
- Postcode district: DL7
- Police: North Yorkshire
- Fire: North Yorkshire
- Ambulance: Yorkshire

South Cowton is a village and civil parish located on the site of an abandoned medieval village in the county of North Yorkshire in England. The population of the civil parish taken at the 2011 census was 188.

The original village was founded some time after the Norman Conquest; the Domesday Book says that South Cowton was owned by Count Alan of Richmond, and was ruled by Godric the Steward. The archaeological remains of the village suggest that there were at least 20 houses during the Medieval period.

The two major historic buildings in South Cowton are South Cowton Castle and St Mary's Church. Both buildings were erected in the 15th century. Both were built by Richard Conyers, one of the few lords of the many Cowton manors ever to actually live there. Between 1489 and 1490 Conyers demolished the village of South Cowton, evicting its tenants in order to convert the land into pastures.

The current village consists of little more than a few widely dispersed farms, the castle and the church. The former villages of Temple Cowton and Atley Cowton, and the hamlets of Atley Hill and Pepper Arden, have been incorporated into the parish of South Cowton.

== Governance ==
From 1974 to 2023 it was part of the Hambleton District, it is now administered by the unitary North Yorkshire Council.

South Cowton falls within the electoral ward of Cowtons. This ward stretches north to Over Dinsdale with a total population taken at the Census 2011 of 1,744.

== See also ==
- Listed buildings in South Cowton
