= Risedale Beck =

River in North Yorkshire, England

Coordinates: 54.391°N 1.711°W

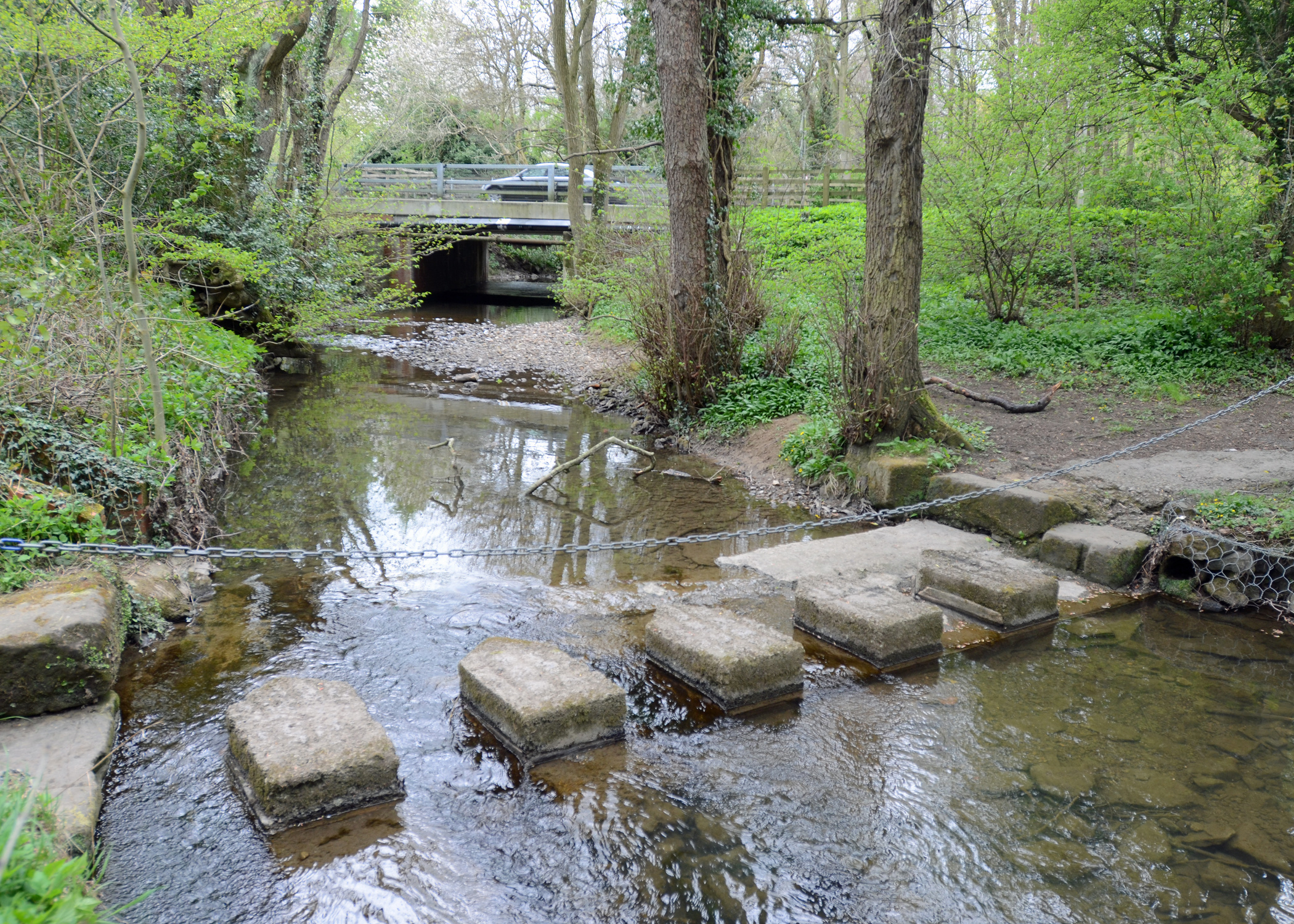
A stepping stone crossing over Leadmill Beck (also known as Risedale Beck further upstream) in Catterick Garrison

Risedale Beck is a small river that rises on Hipswell Moor, near Catterick Garrison in North Yorkshire, England. The name derives from Old Norse as meaning either Risi's Valley (a personal name) or translated as a valley overgrown with brushwood. Risedale Beck flows eastwards into Catterick Garrison as Leadmill Gill, (also known as Cottages Beck) which in turn flows into Colburn Beck, a tributary of the River Swale. The length of the beck from source to the River Swale is 6.5 miles (10.4 km).

As the beck passes through Catterick Garrison, its northern bank forms the edge of Foxglove Covert, a nationally acclaimed nature reserve on military land. Otters have been noted at the covert and they were filmed fishing on the beck.

In June 2007, the area suffered 2-months worth of rain in 48 hours. This led to the beck being swollen from what is normally a trickle to waist deep water. A British Army infantry course on their final 8 mi (13 km) fitness test forded the beck. One private was swept away to his death.
