= Colburn, North Yorkshire =

Town and civil parish in North Yorkshire, England

Coordinates: 54°22′47″N 1°41′17″W

Colburn
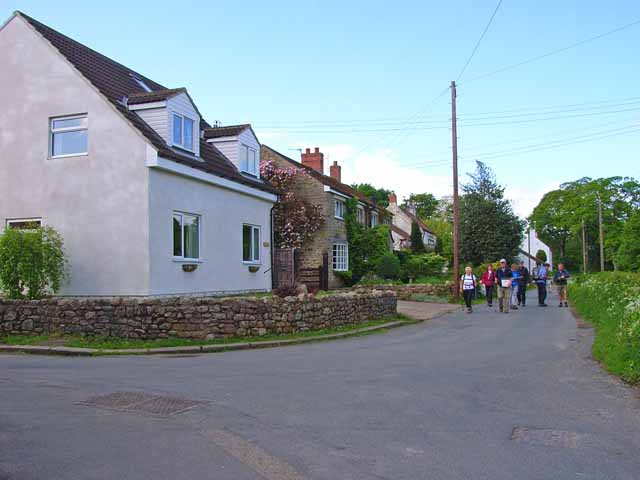
- Old Colburn, on the route of the Coast to Coast Walk

- Location within North Yorkshire
- Population: 4,860 (2011 census)
- OS grid reference: SE203982
- Civil parish: Colburn
- Unitary authority: North Yorkshire
- Ceremonial county: North Yorkshire
- Region: Yorkshire and the Humber
- Country: England
- Sovereign state: United Kingdom
- Post town: Catterick Garrison
- Postcode district: DL9
- Dialling code: 01748
- Police: North Yorkshire
- Fire: North Yorkshire
- Ambulance: Yorkshire
- UK Parliament: Richmond and Northallerton

Colburn is a town, civil parish and electoral ward in North Yorkshire, England, 2 miles (3.2 km) west of Catterick. It had a population of 4,860 at the 2011 census, rising from 3,606 in 2001.

== History ==
The town takes its name from the first settlers along the stream Colburn Beck. It means "cold stream," "coal stream" or "cool, black stream" and is a mixture of Old English and Old Norse (Col, Kol and Burna). A "burn" refers to a valley that has been eroded by flowing water. The Colburn (Coburn) family is widespread around the world, including Edward Colburn, great grandfather of Reuben Colburn, who came to America in 1635 on the ship "Defence" part of the Puritan Great Migration of the 1630s led by John Winthrop. Colburn Hall, a grade II* listed building is located on the outskirts of the old village, along with a grade I listed courthouse dating back to the 1300s.

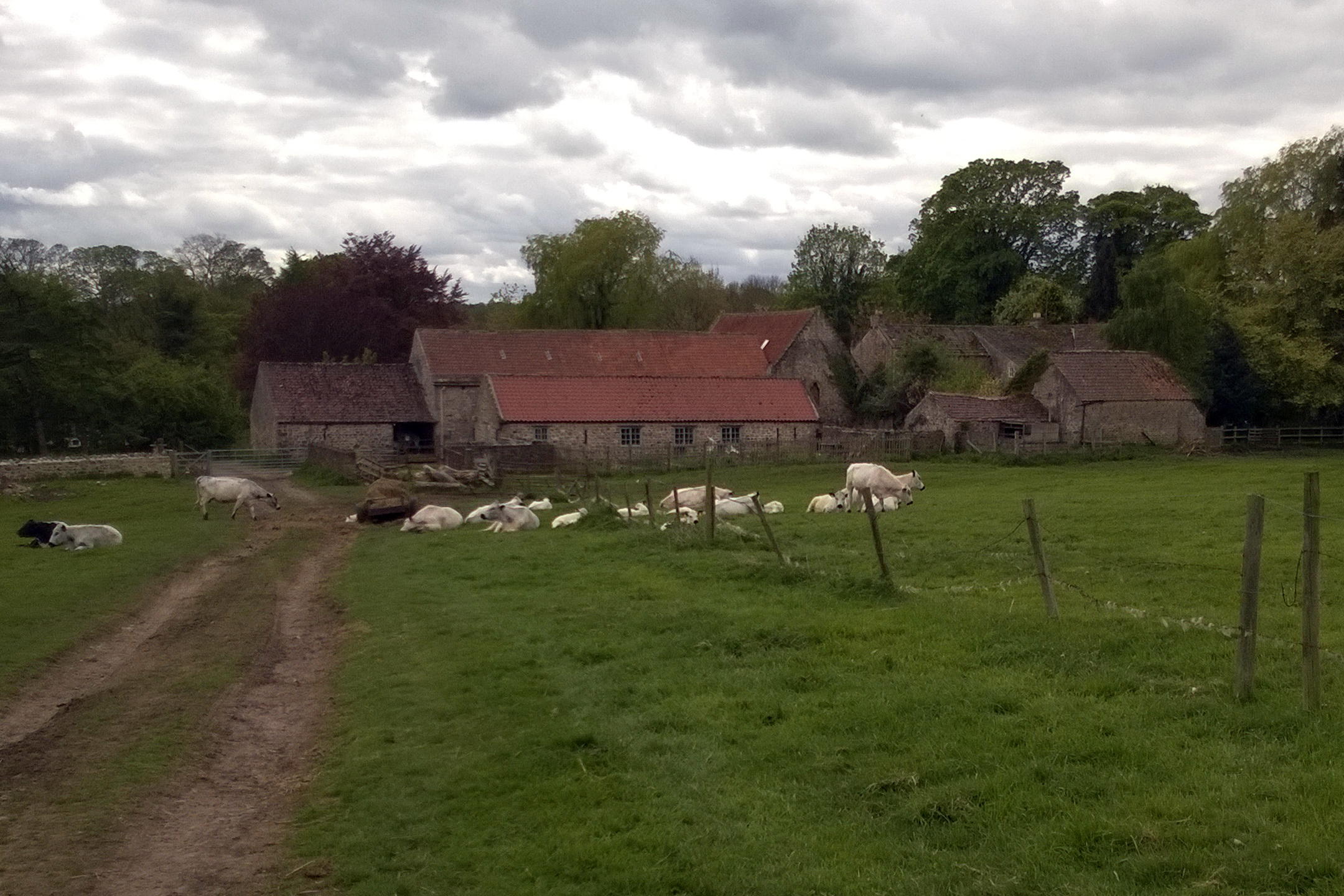
Colburn Hall

In 1870-72 John Marius Wilson's Imperial Gazetteer of England and Wales described Colburn as:

"a township in Catterick parish, N. R. Yorkshire; on the river Swale, 2½ miles SE by E of Richmond. Acres, 1, 318. Real property, £1, 736. Pop., 142. Houses, 26."

In 2018, the Broadway shopping precinct, Colburn Business Park, as well as neighbouring Brough with St Giles, attracted attention in regional press by being put under a public spaces protection order by North Yorkshire Police, due to over 200 reports of anti-social behaviour involving young people.

== Economy ==
The primary shopping area, known as the Broadway precinct, includes a Co-op convenience store, as well as several independent businesses and the community library. Colburn Business Park was opened in 2008, consisting of over 50,000 sq ft of office space and 20 buildings.

== Governance ==
The village lies within the Richmond and Northallerton parliamentary constituency, which is under the control of the Conservative Party. The current Member of Parliament, since the 2015 general election, is Rishi Sunak.

Colburn lies within the unitary authority area of North Yorkshire Council. Between 1974 and 2023 it was part of the Richmondshire district.

Colburn had its own ward under Richmondshire District Council, which also included the suburb of Walkerville. In 2005, controversial plans for the district council to move their offices in Richmond into new premises at Colburn at the cost of £4 million (to be funded by the sale of two Richmond car parks) were axed.

Colburn also has a town council, and a mayor elected by members, with nine councillors sitting as of 2020.

== Education ==
The town has one primary school, Colburn Community Primary School, and the closest provider of secondary education is Risedale School in neighbouring Hipswell.

== Community and culture ==
St Cuthbert's Church, Colburn was opened in 1957 to serve the residents of the new Colburn estate. The only traditional public house, The Hildyard Arms, is situated in the old Colburn Village, it first opened in 1823 and underwent a major renovation in the early 2010s after gaining new lease holders.

The town's football club, Colburn Town FC, play in the Wensleydale Creamery League, an affiliate league of the North Riding County Football Association. Colburn Leisure Centre was opened in 2002 and includes a gymnasium, dance studio, and serves as a base for the local touch rugby and gymnastics groups, the gym received a £35,000 upgrade in 2019.

== Public services ==
The town's primary healthcare provider is the Colburn Medial Practice, a general practice managed by South Tees Hospitals NHS Foundation Trust. it runs in close partnership with nearby Catterick Village Health Centre. The closest hospital providing A&E services is Darlington Memorial, 15 miles (24 km) to the north east. Local ambulances are run by the Yorkshire Ambulance Service, the town is also in the catchment area of the Great North Air Ambulance, North Yorkshire Fire and Rescue have a retained station in the town, and North Yorkshire Police are the territorial police force.

== See also ==
- Listed buildings in Colburn, North Yorkshire
