= Catterick Integrated Care Centre =

Medical centre in North Yorkshire, England

- Tees, Esk and Wear Valleys NHS Foundation Trust

Geography
- Location: Catterick Garrison, North Yorkshire, England
- Coordinates: 54.37276°N 1.71713°W

Organisation
- Care system: NHS
- Type: Community

Services
- Emergency department: No

Links
- Website: www.nth.nhs.uk/locations/catterick-integrated-care-centre-cicc/
- Lists: Hospitals in England

The Catterick Integrated Care Centre (CICC), is a hospital located in Catterick Garrison, North Yorkshire, England. The hospital is a joint facility between the National Health Service (NHS) and the Ministry of Defence (MoD) with a split that is roughly 25% NHS, and 75% MoD. The hospital is expected to fully open in the autumn of 2026 and have a staffing level of 300, spread between NHS and MoD medical professionals.

== History ==
When the British Army developed Catterick Garrison on 1915, they built a 200-bed hospital opposite to where Catterick Camp railway station was located. This was in turn replaced by the Duchess of Kent Military Hospital in 1976, which was located near to the main road through the garrison. The Duchess of Kent Military Hospital closed in June 1999, with services being transferred away to medical establishments elsewhere. With other bases being closed, and the concentrating of resources at Catterick Garrison, the increasing personnel numbers, (Note: Troop numbers are expected to increase from 6,000 in 2020, to 9,500 in 2031.) and their dependants, meant that all services in the town were tested to see what needed to be improved, including leisure and medical facilities.

The CICC was first proposed as a joint facility in 2015 under the name Catterick Integrated Care Campus, approval was given in 2022 to build a brand new hospital that would cater for armed forces personnel and their families, as well as local civilians. The facility has the possibility to treat 1,000 patients a day, and these will be spread over cardiac rehabilitation, diabetes care, urgent GP care appointments, mental health support, paediatrics, physiotherapy, trauma and orthopaedic clinics, and rehabilitation services for injured military personnel. The new facility is located on Peronne Lines (sections of the camp at Catterick Garrison are divided into lines). (Note: In his book, The Story of Catterick Camp 1915 - 1972, Howard Cole explains that the meaning of the word Lines; it "became accepted in the military sense to mean a section or part of a Camp.") When the integrated care facility is opened, the Harewood GP practice in the garrison will move into the new building. Other services from the same NHS trust, such as mental health surgeries at North Moor House and Colburn, will also move into the new unit.

The facility is expected to open in autumn 2026 at a cost of £110 million, (Note: The original estimate was £55 million, with £12.69 million coming from the NHS.) and is projecting that 75% of its patients will be military personnel, and the other 25% will be civilians. From above looking at the building in a northwards direction, the building resembles a capital 'E' shape, and at its maximum is 18 metres (59 ft) high, and some 113 metres (371 ft) long, and 54 metres (177 ft) wide. The footprint of the building is expected to cover 12,000 square metres (130,000 sq ft).
