= Hipswell Moor =

Area used for military training in North Yorkshire, England

Coordinates: 54.371°N 1.773°W

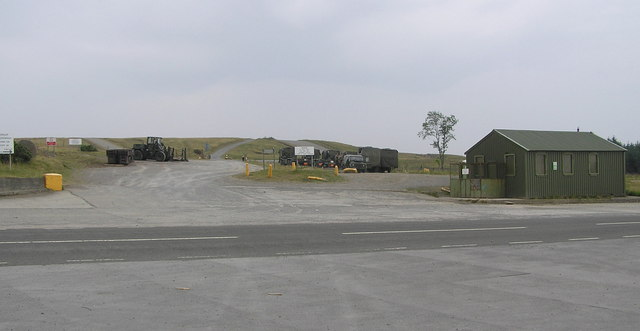
Road junction leading to Hipswell Moor

Hipswell Moor is an area used for military training, near Catterick Garrison in North Yorkshire, England. It includes parts of the civil parishes of Barden and Hipswell, as well as Barden Fell hill (316 metres (1,037 ft) a.s.l.).
