= Scotton, Richmondshire =

Village and civil parish in North Yorkshire, England

Coordinates: 54.35678°N 1.70495°W

Scotton
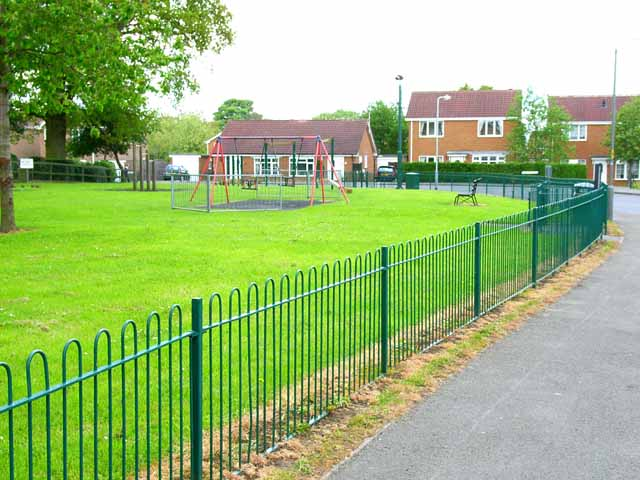
- Kestrel Drive, Scotton

- Location within North Yorkshire
- Population: 4,810 (2011)
- OS grid reference: SE192957
- Unitary authority: North Yorkshire
- Ceremonial county: North Yorkshire
- Region: Yorkshire and the Humber
- Country: England
- Sovereign state: United Kingdom
- Post town: CATTERICK GARRISON
- Postcode district: DL9
- Police: North Yorkshire
- Fire: North Yorkshire
- Ambulance: Yorkshire

Scotton is a village, civil parish and electoral ward in the county of North Yorkshire, England. The civil parish includes the centre and south of Catterick Garrison. The village lies in the south of the civil parish, and is effectively a suburb of Catterick Garrison. The village of Scotton is located 3 1/4 miles south west of Catterick village.

== History ==
The name Scotton derives from the Old English Scotttūn meaning 'settlement of the Scots'.

In the 1870s, John Marius Wilson's Imperial Gazetteer of England and Wales described Scotton like this:

SCOTTON, a township in Catterick and Patrick-Brompton parishes, N. R. Yorkshire; 3 miles S S E of Richmond. Acres, 1, 500. Real property, £1, 203. Pop, 111. Houses, 23. The manor belongs to Lord Wenlock.

The township became a separate civil parish in 1866. Scotton is now categorised as being a 'small town surrounded by inhabited countryside' by the Office for National Statistics. Since the opening of the army barracks in Catterick, there has been a growth of housing in Scotton, to accommodate families and dependants of the army personnel based in the nearby town. Typical housing types in Scotton are semi-detached and terraced housing, and the average house price for a semi-detached house calculated in 2013 was £214,333.

== Governance ==
Scotton is one of 53 Parish and Town councils in Richmondshire. The Parish Council is the local government in Richmondshire nearest to the people of Scotton. It manages local amenities in Scotton and has a watching brief on local issues; their opinion is noted by higher authorities in matters concerning them, such as local planning issues. From 1974 to 2023 it was part of the district of Richmondshire, it is now administered by the unitary North Yorkshire Council.

== Transport ==
Scotton lies four miles south of Richmond town. The closest railway station is Northallerton railway station, which is located 11.63 miles from Scotton and there is a bus route, the X27 connecting Scotton with Catterick Garrison, Richmond and Darlington.

== Demography ==
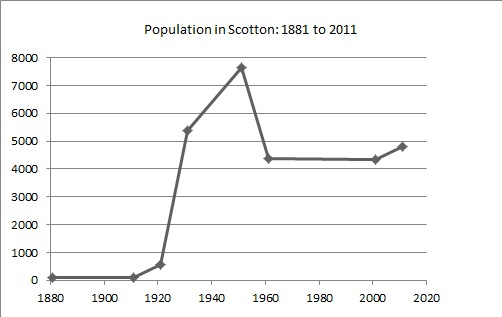
Total Population in Scotton, 1881 to 2011.

According to census information, between 1881 and 1951, the population of Scotton increased from 116 to 7,655. In 1911 the population totalled 97 and by 1921 it was 558. This major influx in population was most likely due to the opening of Catterick Garrison army barracks at the beginning of the First World War in 1914, when it was founded by Lord Baden Powell. During the Second World War Catterick Garrison was home to over 40,000 military personnel and in 2012 it was still home to 13,000; so dependants of these service personnel living in Scotton would have led to this increase in population. It had a population of 4,810 according to the 2011 census. In 1951, the population of Scotton was 7,655, so it has decreased since due to the decline in military activity in neighbouring Catterick Garrison. Before the development of Catterick Garrison, Scotton was a country estate. Scotton Hall, its park, Scotton Lodge and Scotton Cottage are now surrounded by army barracks.

=== Economy ===
Charts showing Occupational changes in Scotton, in 1881 and 2011

In the 1881 census of England and Wales it was recorded that 26 people worked in agriculture in Scotton, 24 of which were men. 4 women were recorded to work in domestic services or offices and the few remaining men were recorded to have worked in positions including food and lodgings, and animals. Further evidence to suggest the agricultural background of the village is the names origin. The name 'Scotton' originated from a 'Scots farm or settlement'; with 'Scoti' meaning a Scot, and 'tun' being Old English for an enclosure or farmstead.

There has been a clear shift in industry in the village since 1881. According to the 2011 census, 14 people worked in agriculture. There has been a decreased number of people working in agriculture since 1881, despite an increase in population. The main job sector in 2011 was 'Public Administration and Defence; Compulsory Social Security'; 2165 people worked in 'Public Administration and Defence' in 2011. This high number is most likely because of Scotton's close proximity to Catterick, as a vast majority of the population would be working at Catterick Garrison (army barracks), in the national defence sector.

== Community and culture ==
=== Education ===
There are no schools in Scotton Village itself; the closest schools are in neighbouring Catterick. There are a number of primary schools situated in the area, including Le Cateau Community Primary School, Carnagill Primary School, Wavell Community Infant & Junior School, Hipswell C of E Primary School, Cambrai Primary School and Colburn Community Primary School. There is one secondary school in Catterick, Risedale Sports & Community College.

=== Amenities ===
There are a small handful of amenities located in Scotton village, including Scotton Auto Services and Scotton Park, located on Scotton Road. There is no post office in Scotton Village; the closest one is located in Catterick Garrison town. Overall, shops are limited in the village, so Catterick is the closest town to visit for things such as supermarkets and other facilities.

== Religion ==
Scotton lies within the ecclesiastical parish of Hipswell and is served by the church of St John the Evangelist, Hipswell Road, Hipswell. The current church building was built in 1811, but before that there was a chapel nearby Hipswell Hall, that dated back to the 1200 or 1300s. The chapel became a parish in 1664, when a congregation was formed from the local area. Other churches in the vicinity include St. Joan of Arc and St. Anne, both located in Catterick. There is evidence of St. Anne church dating back to the 7th century and further evidence of a Saxon church having been built on the current site. The present doorway dates back to 1150 and St. Anne is referred to in Domesday Book.
