= St Cuthbert's Church, Colburn =

Church in Colburn, North Yorkshire, England

Coordinates: 54°22′48″N 1°41′19″W

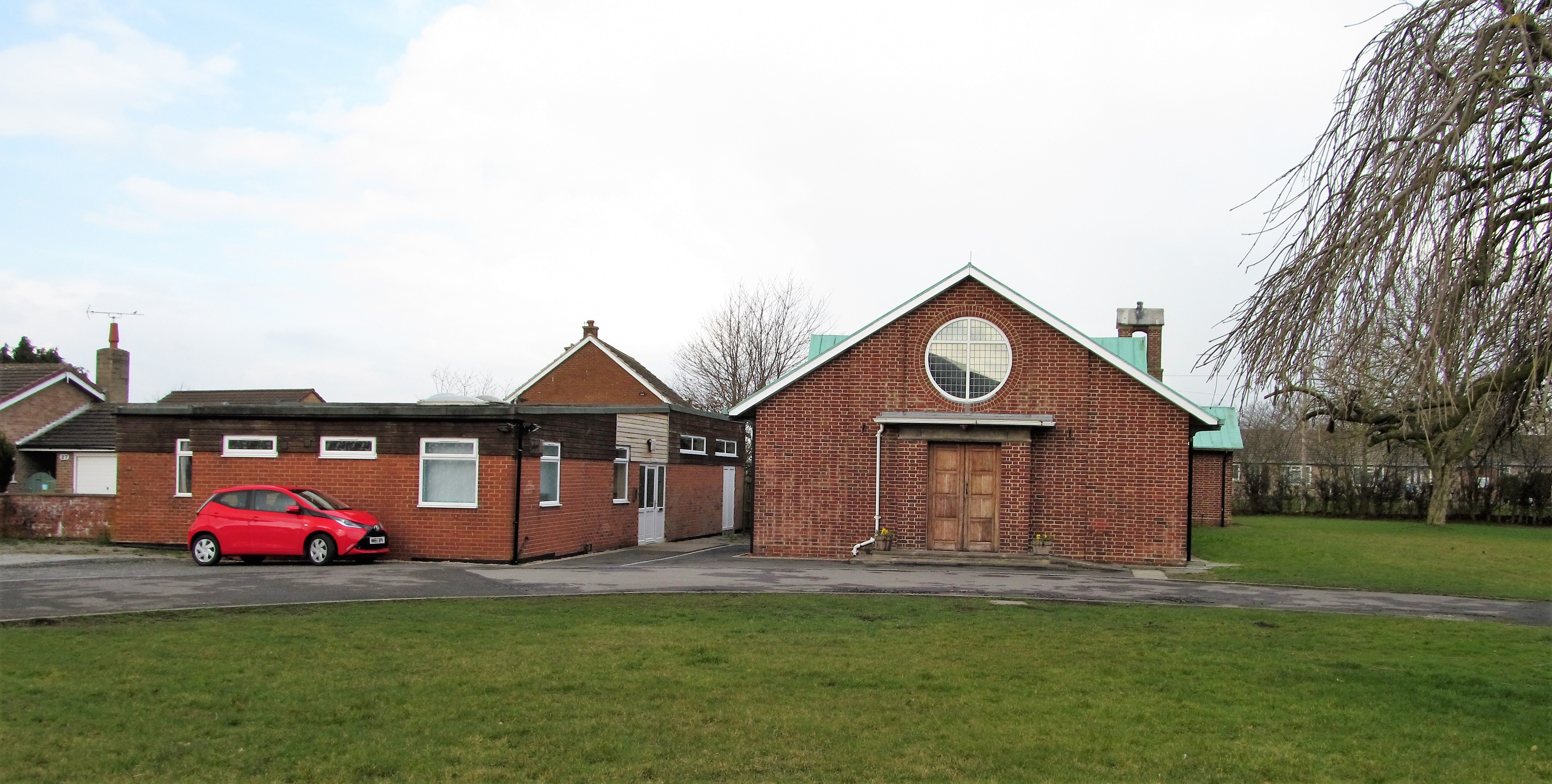
The church, in 2018

St Cuthbert's Church is an Anglican church in Colburn, North Yorkshire, a town in England.

Colburn is an ancient settlement, but its only place of worship in the mediaeval period was the private chapel at Colburn Hall. The village expanded rapidly after World War II, and in 1957, a church was constructed, to a design by Albert Richardson.

The church is a low brick building. The interior is designed to be reminiscent of the hull of an upturned boat. The east end is dominated by a massive applique tapestry, designed by David Holt, depicting Christ in Glory.
