= Listed buildings in Colburn, North Yorkshire =

Colburn is a civil parish in the county of North Yorkshire, England. It contains seven listed buildings that are recorded in the National Heritage List for England. Of these, one is listed at Grade I, the highest of the three grades, one is at Grade II*, the middle grade, and the others are at Grade II, the lowest grade. The parish contains the village of Colburn and the surrounding area, including part of Catterick Garrison to the south of the village. Two of the buildings are in the garrison, and the others are to the north of the village, consisting of a former manor house and an associated courthouse and barn, a cottage, and farm buildings.

== Key ==
Grade	Criteria
I	Buildings of exceptional interest, sometimes considered to be internationally important
II*	Particularly important buildings of more than special interest
II	Buildings of national importance and special interest

== Buildings ==
Name and location	Photograph	Date	Notes	Grade
Colburn Hall; 54.38818°N 1.69949°W	—	c. 1300	A manor house that has been much altered and extended through the centuries. It is in stone, with quoins, and a stone slate roof with stone copings, shaped kneelers, and finials. There are two storeys, and a T-shaped plan, with a front range of four bays, and a rear outshut. The doorway has a slightly chamfered surround and a hood mould, above which is a carved coat of arms. The windows vary, and include sashes and casements, some with mullions.	II*
Courthouse, Colburn Hall; 54.38823°N 1.69925°W	—	c. 1300	The courthouse, later used for other purposes, is in stone, with quoins, and a pantile roof with stone slates at the eaves, raised verges with moulded coping, and finials. There are two storeys, consisting of a hall and an undercroft, and five bays. It contains doorways and windows of various types.	I
Barn to the east of the Courthouse; 54.38828°N 1.69905°W	—	Late 17th century	The barn is in stone with quoins at the east end, and a pantile roof. There are two storeys, five bays, and a single-storey extension. The openings include doorways, windows, a blocked segmental-arched cart entry with voussoirs, and slit and square vents.	II
Cherry Tree Cottage; 54.38727°N 1.69969°W	—	Late 18th century	A cottage, and a cartshed converted into a garage, in roughcast stone, with a pantile roof and stone slates at the eaves. There are two storeys, two bays, a rear outshut, and a single-storey former cartshed to the right. In the centre is a doorway, and the windows are horizontally-sliding sashes.	II
Farm Buildings, Colburn Farm; 54.38734°N 1.69588°W		Late 18th century	The farm buildings are in stone, and have pantile roofs with stone coping. They consist of a barn, a horse engine house, byres and cartsheds. The barn has two storeys and six bays, and the other buildings have a single storey.	II
Building 55, Catterick Garrison; 54.36880°N 1.70291°W	—	1915	An officers' mess, it was extended in about 1924, and has since been used for other purposes. It has a steel girder frame, concrete walls clad in orange-brown brick, and roofs in asphalt and felt. There is a single storey, and an H-shaped plan, consisting of a pair of nine-bay huts linked by a corridor. At the end of the main range are two projecting wings, and at the rear are small store rooms added later. The windows are in painted galvanised steel.	II
Pinhill Mess, Catterick Garrison; 54.37468°N 1.70330°W	—	1928	The mess is in dark red brick on a plinth, with stone dressings, string courses, and Welsh slate roofs. There is an almost E-shaped plan, with a courtyard to the north. The main front is symmetrical with 17 bays and two storeys, flanked by projecting pavilions. The middle bay is in Portland stone, and contains a semicircular porch with four Tuscan columns on a two-step podium, a moulded architrave, a plain frieze, a projecting cornice and a balcony, and above are pilaster strips and a pediment. The windows are sashes, those in the ground floor with keystones.	II
