= Wensleydale Creamery Football League =

Football league in North Yorkshire, England

Wensleydale Football League
- Organising body: North Riding County Football Association
- Founded: 1919
- Country: England
- Number of clubs: 9 (2023/24)
- Current champions: Unicorn First (2022/23) (Stats available from 2003- present)
- Most championships: Unicorn First (5 titles)

The Wensleydale Creamery Football League (known as the Scotts Storage Wensleydale Football League for sponsorship purposes) is an adult amateur football league based in North Yorkshire in the North Yorkshire Dales and is affiliated with North Riding County FA. The Wensleydale league celebrated its centenary in 2019.

Unicorn First were the champions for 2022/23. This result made them the most successful club since the league was added to FA Full Time in 2003, overtaking Bowes, who had achieved four titles since 2003.

The league will fold at the end of the 2025/26 season.

== Current member clubs (2023/24) ==
Members clubs include:

- Askrigg and Bainbridge United First
- Carperby Rovers First
- Catterick Garrison Football Centre Senior
- Hawes United First
- Leyburn United Men's
- Reeth & District Athletic Club First
- Richmond Town Academy
- Spennithorne & Harmby First
- Unicorn First

== Champions ==
Champions include:

Season	Champions	Runner-up
2003/04	Carperby Rovers	Middleham Town
2004/05	Middleham Town	Bowes
2005/06	Leyburn United	Bowes
2006/07	Bowes	Leyburn United
2007/08	Bowes	Hawes United
2008/09	Bowes	Richmond Town
2009/10	Bowes	Colburn Town
2010/11	Colburn Town	Richmond Town
2011/12	Richmond Town	Spennithorne & Harmby
2012/13	Unicorn 1st	Colburn Town
2013/14	Unicorn 1st	Hawes United
2014/15	Catterick Garrison Football Centre Senior	Colburn Town
2015/16	Richmond Mavericks	Unicorn 1st
2016/17	Richmond Mavericks	Hawes United
2017/18	Colburn Town	Richmond Mavericks
2018/19	Richmond Mavericks 1st	Unicorn 1st
2019/20	N/A	N/A
2020/21	Unicorn 1st	Richmond Town Reserves
2021/22	Unicorn 1st	Richmond Mavericks 1st
2022/23	Unicorn 1st	Richmond Town Reserves
