= Hipswell Hall =

Historic building in North Yorkshire, England

Coordinates: 54°22′52″N 1°42′43″W

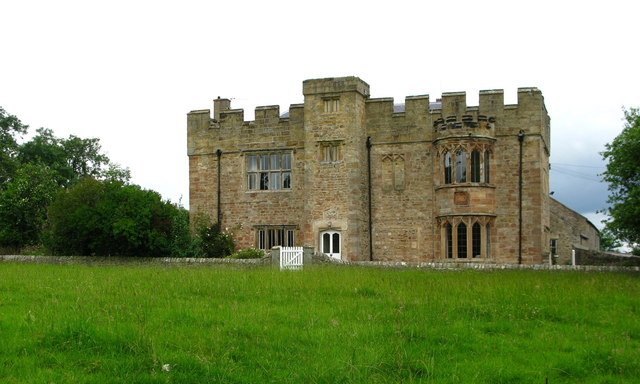
The building, in 2009

Hipswell Hall is a historic building in Hipswell, a village in North Yorkshire, in England.

The building dates from the late 15th century, but it is likely that John Wycliffe was born in an earlier building on the site. It was constructed for the Fulthorpe family, in a similar style to South Cowton Castle but more elegant. In 1559, it passed to the Wandesford family, and in 1596 they enlarged the hall. In about 1840, much of the building was demolished, leaving only the west range. It became used as a farmhouse. In about 1917 a flat-roofed extension was added, reusing some old materials. The building was grade I listed in 1969.

The house is constructed of stone, partly roughcast, with quoins, an embattled parapet, and a stone slate roof. It has two storeys, and projecting from the front is a three-storey tower porch. The porch contains a doorway with a chamfered surround and a lintel with a triangular soffit. Above this is a mullioned window in each floor and a plain parapet. To the left of the porch is a mullioned window in the ground floor and a mullioned and transomed window in the upper floor. To the right is a five-sided two-storey bay window with cinquefoil heads and an embattled parapet with the arms of the Fulthorpes. Between the floors is a traceried panel with a cross moline. The interior has been heavily altered, but an early plaster ceiling with an armorial shield survives in the ground floor bay window.

== See also ==
- Grade I listed buildings in North Yorkshire (district)
- Listed buildings in Hipswell
