= Richardson candle =

Style of electric streetlamp

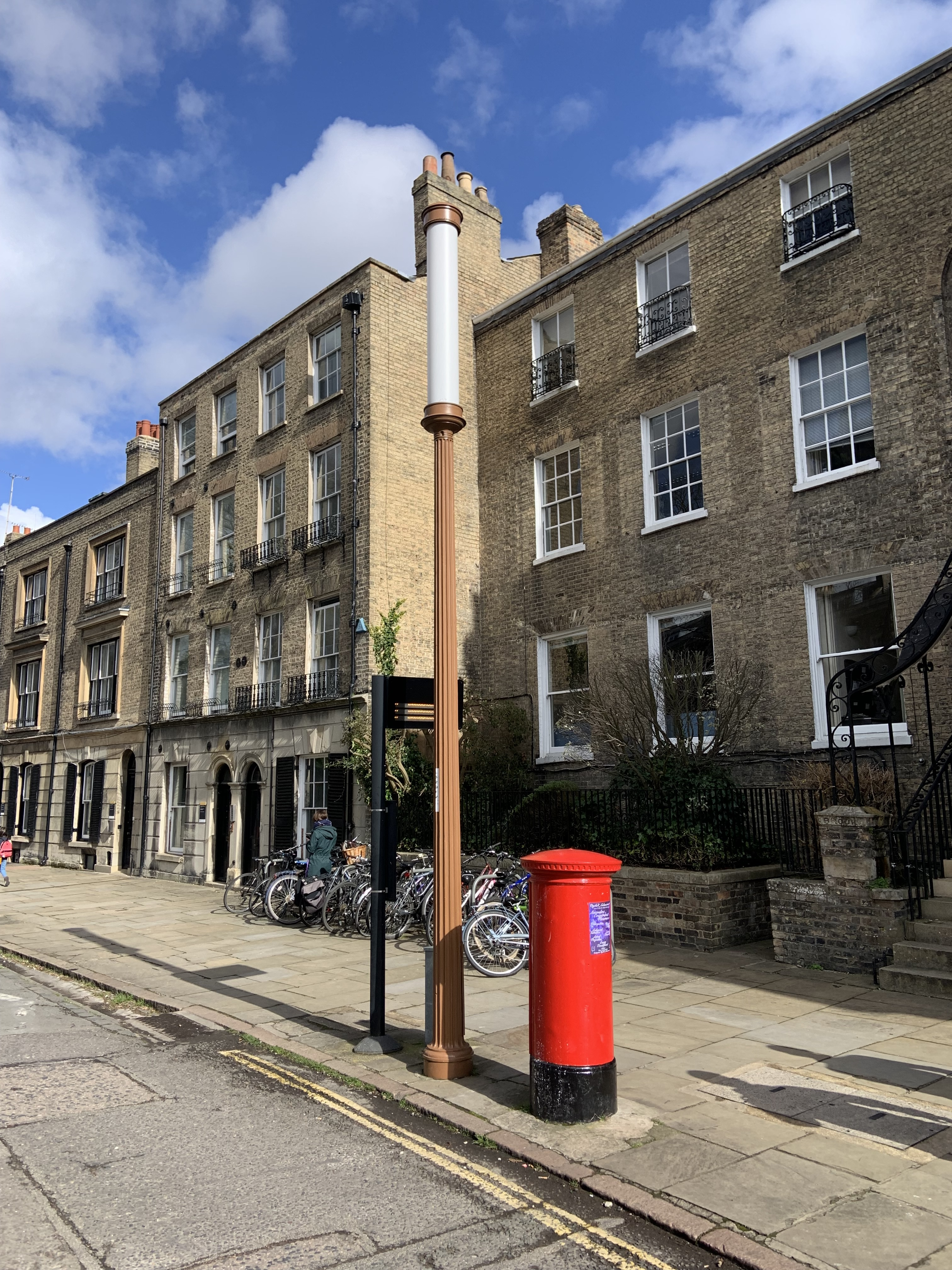
Richardson candle lamp on Trumpington Street

The Richardson candle lamp is a unique vertical style of electric streetlamp designed for and installed in Cambridge in the 1950s. Several examples remain in place in the historic heart of Cambridge, on Trumpington Street, Silver Street, King's Parade, Bene't Street, Trinity Street, and St John's Street.

Many were listed by Historic England at Grade II between 2011 and 2013. According to the listings, "Cambridge is the last city in the UK to retain its own custom-designed lighting stock from the post-war period".

The Richardson candle lamp was designed by Sir Albert Richardson and manufactured by the REVO Electrical Company, based in Tipton, West Midlands. The design was based on the REVO Festival candle lamp, a tall tubular column-mounted lamp designed and installed in Birmingham in 1951 as part of the Festival of Britain and which remained in place until the 1990, for example on Colmore Row. After a trial which rejected an off-the-shelf lamp, Richardson was commissioned in 1957, adopting a similar tall and narrow vertical design to echo the perpendicular architectural lines of many historic Gothic Cambridge buildings, but with less decoration than the Festival candle. The vertical tube of the lamp of white translucent perspex is about 78 in (200 cm) long and 15 in (38 cm) in diameter, surrounding three or four 80 watt fluorescent tubes, with a simple cap and base of cast iron coloured bronze. From the 2010s, fluorescent tubes were replaced with halide bulbs.

A bespoke order of 120 new electric streetlamps was manufactured by REVO, installed in Cambridge in the late 1950s to replace pre-war gas lamps. There were 56 wall-mounted lamps, mounted with brackets embossed with the word "REVO", and 64 mounted on slim fluted cast iron columns with bronze colouring. Approximately half of them survive. Three examples were stolen in 2024, but two were recovered by police in January 2025.

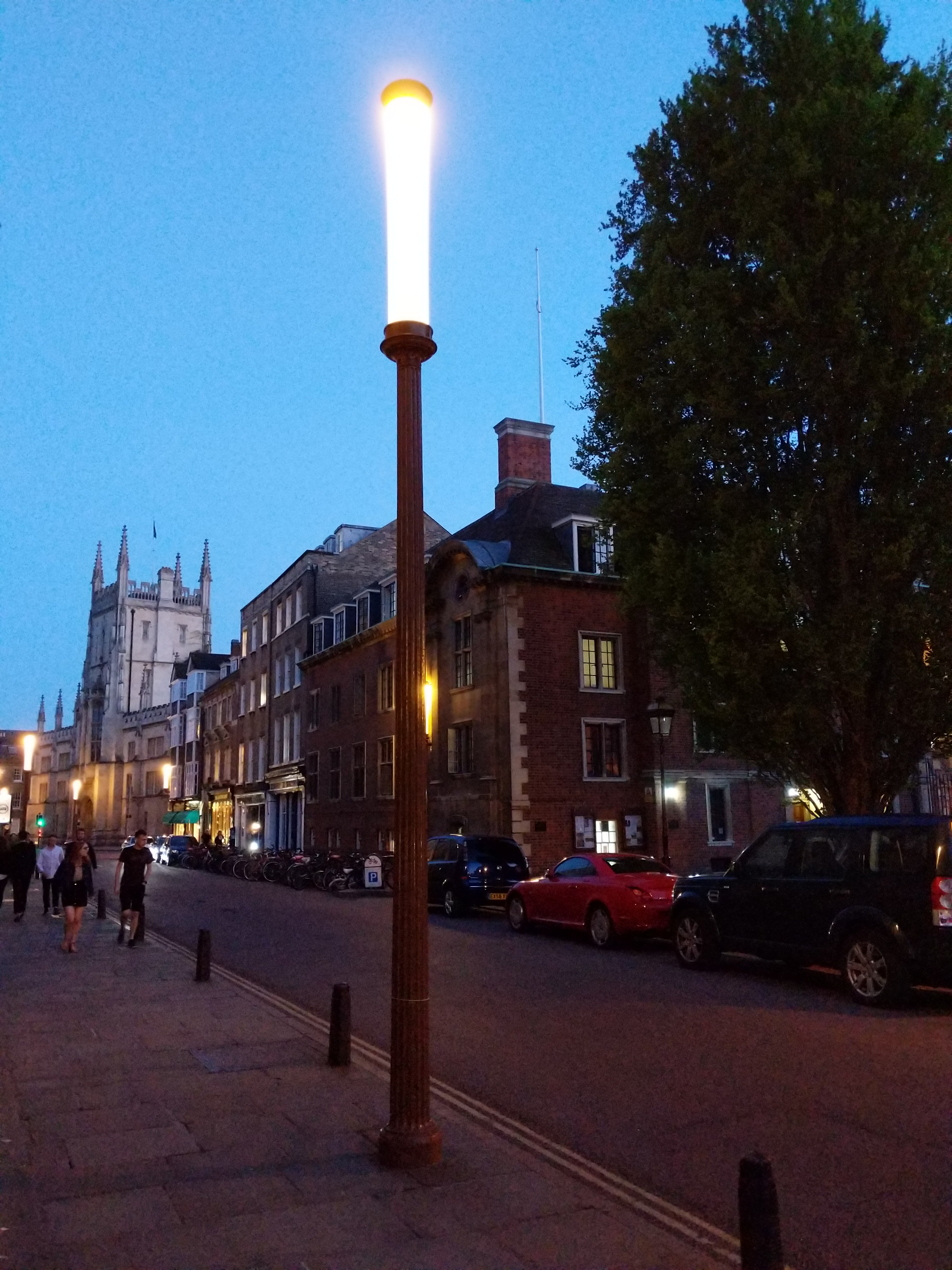
Lit Richardson candle, on Trumpington Street near St Catharine's College

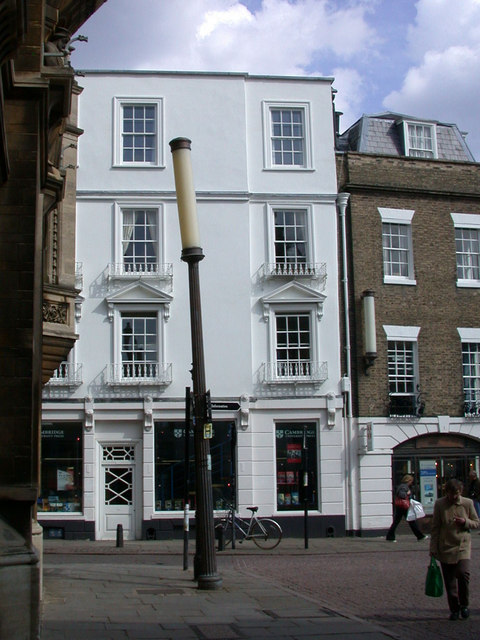
Column-mounted Richardson candle outside Gonville and Caius College, and wall-mounted behind

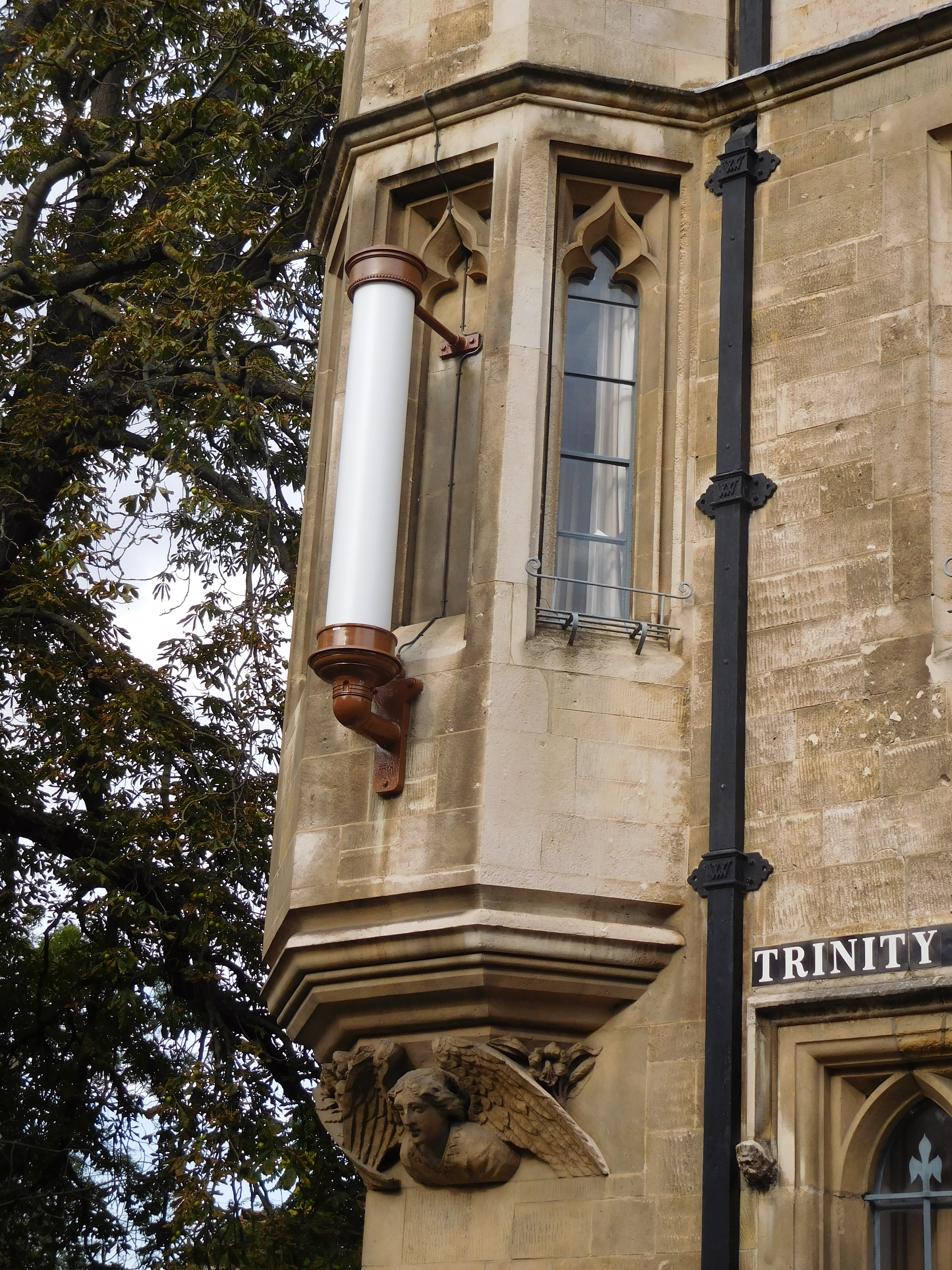
Wall-mounted Richardson candle on Trinity Street

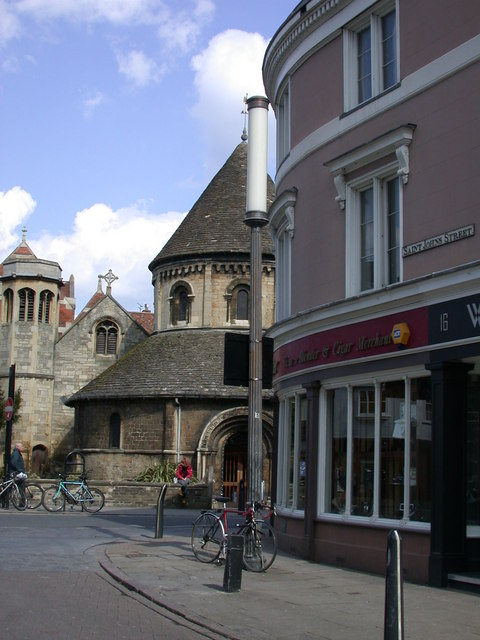
Streetlamp on St John's Street, near the Round Church

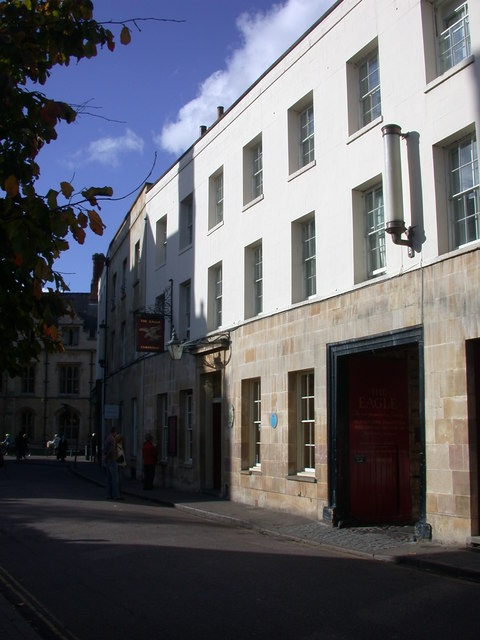
Wall-mounted outside The Eagle on Bene't Street
