= Listed buildings in Hipswell =

Hipswell is a civil parish in the county of North Yorkshire, England. It contains ten listed buildings that are recorded in the National Heritage List for England. Of these, one is listed at Grade I, the highest of the three grades, and the others are at Grade II, the lowest grade. The parish contains the village of Hipswell and the surrounding area. The most important building in the parish is Hipswell Hall, which is listed together with associated structures. Also in the parish is part of Catterick Garrison, and three of its buildings are listed. The other listed buildings are a mill, millhouse and associated outbuildings, a pair of bridges and a church.

== Key ==
| Grade | Criteria |
|---|---|
| I | Buildings of exceptional interest, sometimes considered to be internationally important |
| II | Buildings of national importance and special interest |

== Buildings ==
| Name and location | Photograph | Date | Notes | Grade |
|---|---|---|---|---|
| Hipswell Hall; 54.38102°N 1.71189°W | | 15th century | The surviving western range of a fortified manor house, later a farmhouse, it is in stone, partly roughcast, with quoins, an embattled parapet, and a stone slate roof. There are two storeys, and projecting from the front is a three-storey tower porch. The porch contains a doorway with a chamfered surround and a lintel with a triangular soffit. Above this is a mullioned window in each floor and a plain parapet. To the left of the porch is a mullioned window in the ground floor and a mullioned and transomed window in the upper floor. To the right is a five-sided two-storey bay window, and between the floors is a traceried panel with a cross moline. | I |
| Barn north of Hipswell Hall; 54.38112°N 1.71178°W | — | 16th century | The barn is in stone on a plinth, with quoins and a stone slate roof. There are two storeys and four bays. The barn contains a large doorway with a chamfered and quoined surround and a concrete lintel, and mullioned windows, some with hood moulds, and in the upper floor is a pitching door with a chamfered quoined surround. | II |
| Gate piers northeast of Hipswell Hall; 54.38110°N 1.71177°W | — | 16th century | The gate piers are in stone, and have a square plan. Each pier has a plinth, a corniced cap and a ball finial. | II |
| Hipswell Mill and Millhouse; 54.38082°N 1.71025°W | — | Late 18th century | The mill and millhouse to the west are in stone, and have slate roofs and coped gables and two storeys. They contain various doorways and the windows are horizontally-sliding sashes. In the rear wing of the mill is a large iron waterwheel. | II |
| Outbuildings east of Hipswell Mill; 54.38091°N 1.71010°W | — | Late 18th century | The outbuildings are in stone with quoins and roofs of pantile and tile. They are in one and two storeys, and consist of stables with haylofts above, a privy, a cart shed and a pigsty. | II |
| Sandbeck West Bridge; 54.39333°N 1.74387°W | | Late 18th to early 19th century | A pair of stone bridges at right angles, carrying roads over two streams, linked by a parapet wall. Each bridge has a single semicircular arch. The north bridge has chamfered rustication, a band, a hood mould, a parapet with segmental coping, and flanking pilasters. The south bridge has roughly-dressed voussoirs and a parapet with segmental coping. | II |
| St John's Church; 54.37990°N 1.71261°W | | 1811 | The church, which was restored and altered in 1893–94 by C. Hodgson Fowler, is in sandstone with a Welsh slate roof. It consists of a nave and a chancel under one roof, a south porch and a north vestry. On the west gable is a bellcote with a corbelled cupola. The porch is gabled, and has a four-centred arch with the date on the apex stone. | II |
| Officers' Mess and Stables, Bourlon Barracks; 54.37962°N 1.74880°W | — | 1938 | The building in Catterick Garrison is in red brick with a hipped Westmorland slate roof. There are two storeys and a C-shaped plan, with a main range of eleven bays and recessed three-bay wings. On the front is a porch in Portland stone with Doric pilasters and an arched doorway. The windows are sashes, those in the ground floor arched with gauged brick heads. To the northwest is a stable block with six bays. | II |
| Sandhurst Block, Bourlon Barracks; 54.38156°N 1.74463°W | — | 1938 | The building in Catterick Garrison is in red brick with Portland stone dressings and hipped Westmorland slate roofs. There is a complex butterfly plan, with mirrored U-shaped accommodation blocks linked by a central block. The central block has three storeys and 21 bays, the centre projecting and containing a stone doorway with an arched canopy. The block is surmounted by a square clock tower in lead, timber and copper. | II |
| Officers' Mess and Stables, Gaza Barracks; 54.38047°N 1.72279°W | | 1938 | The building in Catterick Garrison is in red brick with a hipped Westmorland slate roof. There are two storeys and a C-shaped plan, with a main range of nine bays, recessed three-bay wings, and an extension on the east wing. On the front is a stone porch in Tuscan style, and the windows are sashes, those in he ground floor with segmental-arched heads. | II |
