= St John's Church, Hipswell =

Church in Hipswell, North Yorkshire, England

Coordinates: 54.3799°N 1.7126°W

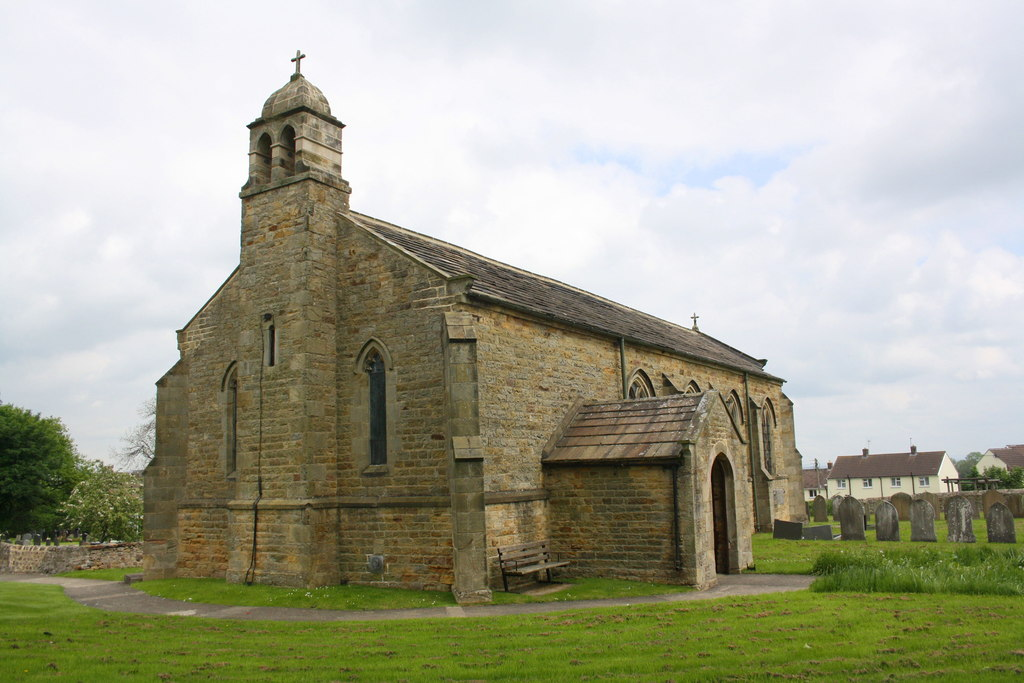
The church, in 2016

St John's Church is an Anglican church in Hipswell, a village in North Yorkshire, in England.

There was a church in Hipswell by the late mediaeval period, although only the only remain is a 16th-century window head. The current church was built in 1811, and in 1893 C. Hodgson Fowler added the chancel, vestry and replaced the windows. It was grade II listed in 1969.

The church is built of sandstone with a Welsh slate roof. It consists of a nave and a chancel under one roof, a south porch and a north vestry. On the west gable is a bellcote with a corbelled cupola. The porch is gabled, and has a four-centred arch with the date on the apex stone. Inside, the old window head is in the vestry, while there is a timber screen at the west end of the church. There is a wall monument to the Reverend James Robinson.

== See also ==
- Listed buildings in Hipswell
