= Catterick Garrison =

Garrison and military town in North Yorkshire, England

Coordinates: 54.3774°N 1.7220°W

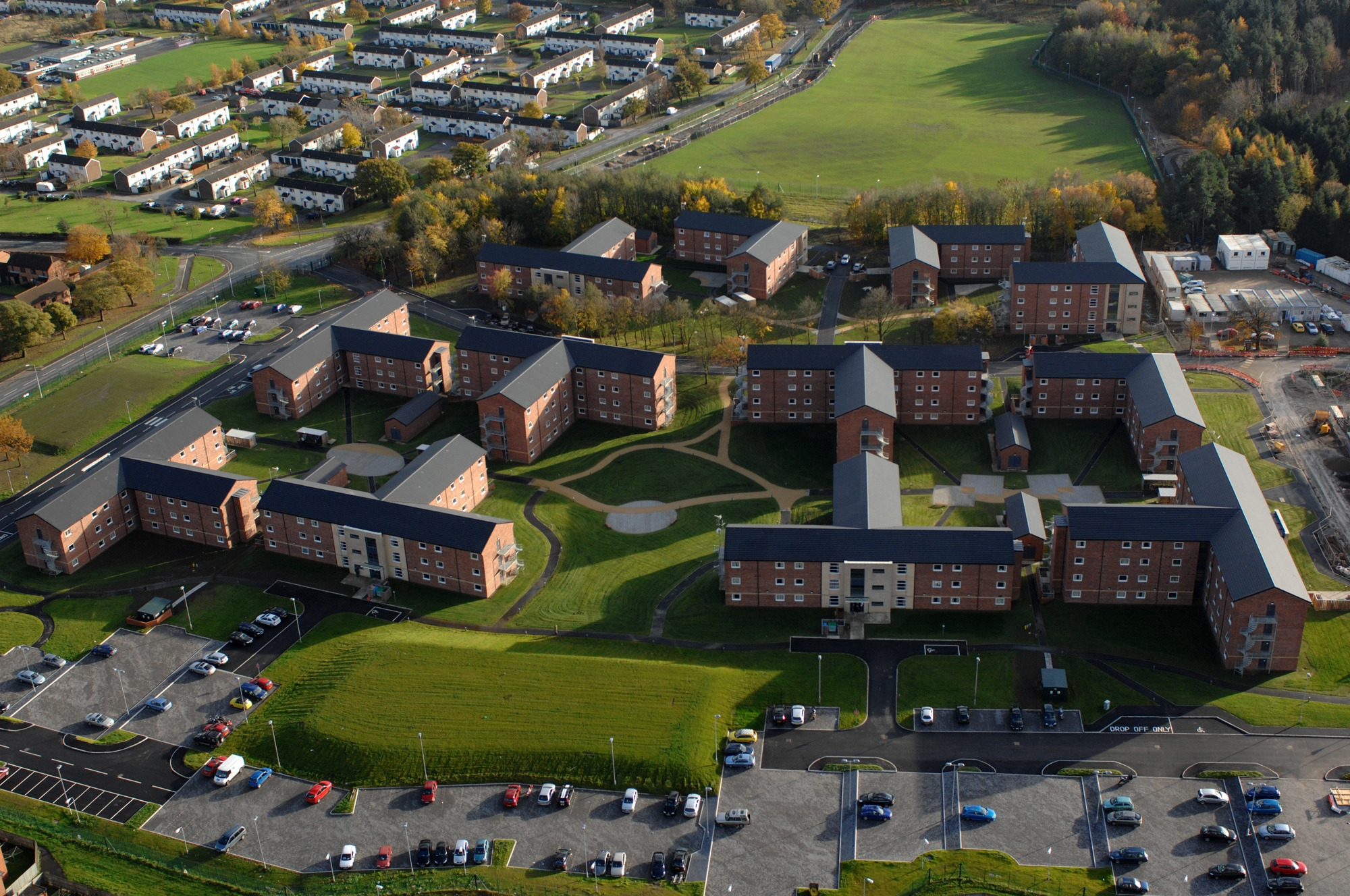
- Single Living Accommodation (SLA) blocks at Catterick.

- Badge of Catterick Garrison

- Location within North Yorkshire
- Population: 14,000
- OS grid reference: SE 180 980
- Civil parish: Hipswell; Scotton
- Unitary authority: North Yorkshire
- Ceremonial county: North Yorkshire
- Region: Yorkshire and the Humber
- Country: England
- Sovereign state: United Kingdom
- Post town: CATTERICK GARRISON
- Postcode district: DL9
- Dialling code: 01748
- Police: North Yorkshire
- Fire: North Yorkshire
- Ambulance: Yorkshire
- UK Parliament: Richmond and Northallerton

Catterick Garrison is a major garrison and military town 3 miles (5 km) south of Richmond, North Yorkshire, England. It is the largest British Army garrison in the world, with a population of around 14,000 in 2021 and covering over 2,400 acres (about 10 km^{2}).

== History ==
In October 1907, Robert Baden-Powell was appointed to command the Northumbrian Division of the newly formed Territorial Army. His headquarters were in Richmond Castle, which was too small to hold the garrison, so he chose as a replacement the site for the Catterick military town.

On 12 August 1914, the order was issued for the construction of the camp, following the outbreak of the First World War. The original intention was for Catterick to be a temporary camp to accommodate two complete divisions with around 40,000 men in 2,000 huts.

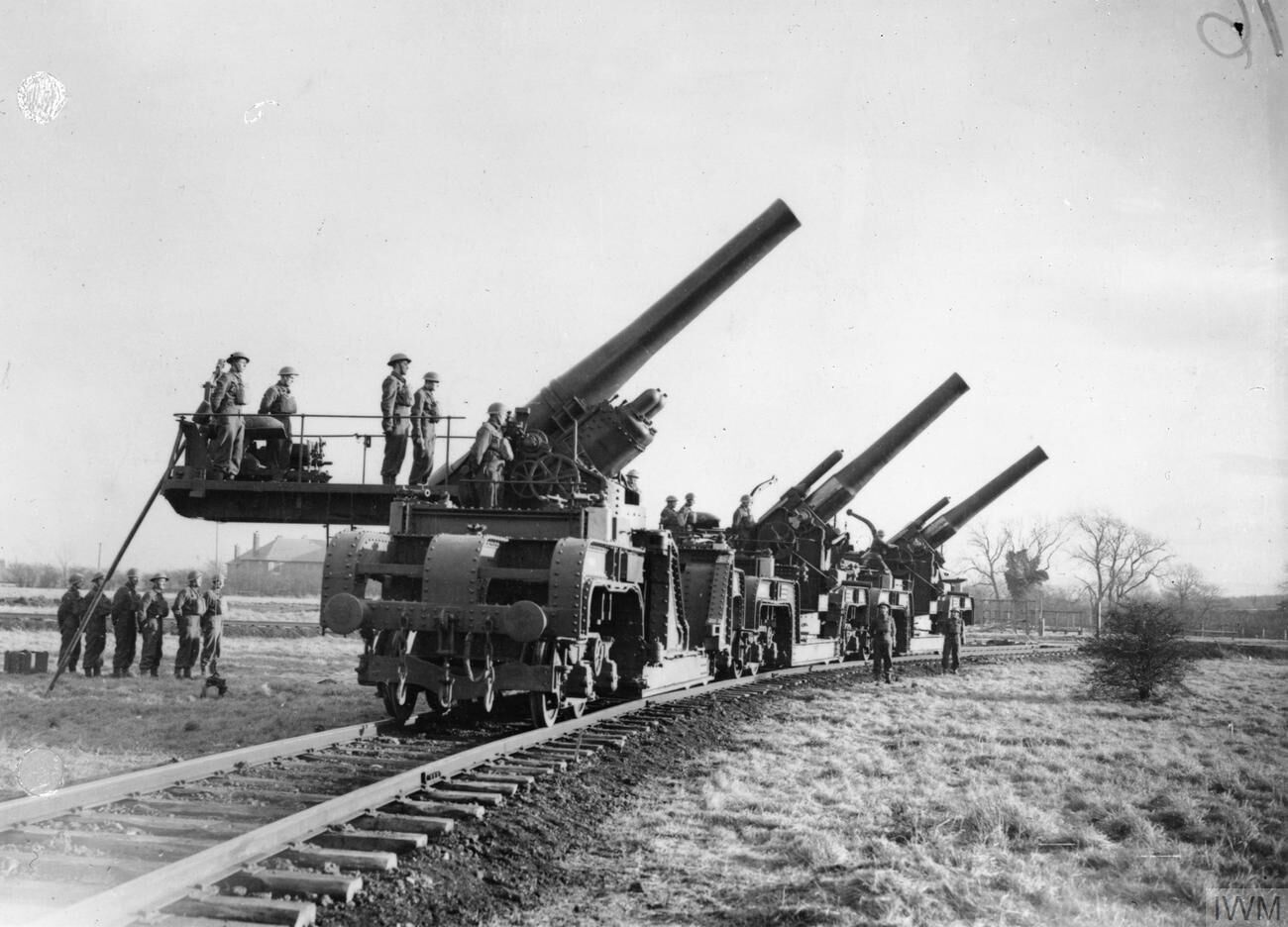
One Mk V 12-inch railway howitzer (foreground) and two Mk III 12-inch railway howitzers at Catterick in 1940

The base was originally named Richmond Camp but was changed to Catterick Camp in 1915 and later modified to Catterick Garrison in 1973. After serving as a prisoner of war camp at the end of the First World War, the idea to make Catterick a permanent military barracks was first suggested after the partitioning of Ireland in 1921, to replace The Curragh. The required land was purchased, and building plans were put forward in 1923. Construction was undertaken by John Laing & Son, and by the mid-1930s most of the camp's facilities were complete. During the Second World War, the camp was once again used to house prisoners of war.

RAF Catterick closed in 1994 and was transferred to the British Army to become Marne Barracks, which falls under the command of Catterick Garrison.

In 2007 an investigation began after allegations that a Parachute Regiment soldier was filmed being sexually assaulted in Catterick.

In 2018, to celebrate the centenary of the Armistice and the end of the First World War, four stone monuments, depicting a steam locomotive, a likeness of Lord Baden Powell, a First World War Tommy, and a pilot of the Royal Flying Corps, were erected on the town's central roundabout.

== Governance ==
Between 1974 and 2023 it was in the Richmondshire district of North Yorkshire, within the Central Richmondshire electoral division of North Yorkshire County Council and divided between the Hipswell and Scotton wards of Richmondshire District Council.

The town is divided between two civil parishes, the southern part of the town, south of a small stream known as Leadmill Gill, is in the civil parish of Scotton, the northern part forms the greater part of the civil parish of Hipswell. Each parish has its own parish council.

Catterick Garrison was within the Richmond (Yorks) parliamentary constituency, following the completion of the 2023 review of Westminster constituencies, the seat was abolished. Subject to moderate boundary changes, it was reformed as Richmond and Northallerton, first contested at the 2024 general election. These seats have been represented since 2015 by Conservative Rishi Sunak.

== Geography ==
Catterick Garrison is located on the A6136 road, connecting Richmond with the A1(M) at Catterick Village, 4.7 miles (7.6 km) to the east. Nearby are the suburban settlements of Scotton 1.6 miles (2.6 km) south and Hipswell 0.7 miles (1.1 km) to the east, as well as Colburn, 1.9 miles (3.1 km) to the east.

Foxglove Covert, a local nature reserve, was the first of its kind in North Yorkshire and the first to be located on Ministry of Defence (MoD) land in the UK. It covers 100 acres of moorland edge, and was opened in 1992. In 2001 it was declared a Site of Local Nature Conservation Importance (SLNCI).

== Commerce ==
The town has two centres for shopping, a small shopping parade (on Catterick Road between Byng Road and Vicarage Road) and the town centre. The town centre developed around Richmond Road from the 2000s. Richmondshire Walk and a supermarket were opended in 2000 on the west side of Richmond Road near village shops on east side of the road. From 2013 to 2015, the centre was expanded with the Princes Gate development, on MoD-owned land north of Richmondshire Walk, with new retail outlets, a cinema, 60-bedroom hotel as well as places for eating and drinking.

== Transport ==
There is no longer a railway station at the garrison. Catterick Camp railway station was a terminus station on the Eryholme-Richmond branch line until its closure in 1964; the closest mainline railway stations are now at Northallerton and Darlington; they are equidistant, at 15.9 miles (25.6 km) south-east and north-east respectively. Regular bus services to Richmond and Darlington are operated by Arriva North East; the closest airport is Teesside International Airport, 21.3 miles (34.3 km) north-east.

== Education ==
Primary education is provided by Carnagill Community Primary School, built in 1966, Wavell School, Le Cateau Community Primary School and Cambrai Primary School, a free school opened in 2019 on the complex formerly housing a campus of Darlington College. Pupils then receive secondary education at Risedale School. Alternatively, children may also attend school at Richmond School and Sixth Form College.

== Religion ==
The town has three existing churches. St. Joan of Arc is a Roman Catholic memorial church built in 1930 and situated within the Diocese of Middlesbrough, but owing to its position is governed by the Bishopric of the Forces. On the same road is St Aidan's Garrison Church, and The Garrison Memorial Church of St Martin and St Oswald.

=== Garrison Cemetery ===
Catterick Garrison Cemetery, on the north side of St John's Churchyard in Hipswell, was opened by the War Office in 1930 to serve the camp. Among its graves are those of 42 Commonwealth service personnel of the Second World War and some Polish servicemen.

Previously soldiers from the camp and military hospital were buried in St John's Churchyard, which now contains the war graves of 64 Commonwealth service personnel of the First World War and two of the Second World War.

== Community and culture ==
=== Sport ===
The town's football club, Catterick Garrison Football Centre, was founded in 2006, and the senior team play in the Wensleydale Creamery League, an affiliate league of the North Riding County Football Association. The Catterick Crusaders rugby league team play in the North East Division of the Rugby League Conference, originally known as the Northallerton Stallions, they adopted their current name after relocation in 2012.

=== Media ===
The town was formerly home to Garrison FM until 2013, when the Ministry of Defence merged Garrison FM's contract with that of overseas forces' station BFBS, who took over local broadcasting for the garrison area. The Catterick Garrison Military WAGS Choir, formed in 2010 was the basis for the BBC programme The Choir: Military Wives and the 2019 film Military Wives (film), which also has scenes filmed in the garrison itself.

=== Leisure facilities ===
Catterick Leisure Centre is a purpose-built complex opposite the retail park, opened in July 2009; it offers a broad spectrum of leisure and fitness facilities including a swimming pool and a gym, as well as an adjoining public library.

Catterick Garrison once had one of Yorkshire's largest cinemas, the Ritz Cinema, which opened on 21 December 1940 and had over 1000 seats. It closed on 2 July 1977 after declining usage; today, the site is used as a health and beauty salon. The town would gain a seven screen cinema in 2015 as part of the Princes Gate retail complex.

== Public services ==
The town has a leisure centre and its primary healthcare provider is the Harewood Medical general practice managed by South Tees Hospitals NHS Foundation Trust. The Duchess of Kent Hospital was a military hospital opened on 6 October 1976 and closed its major surgery and hospital wings in 1999, it was still used as a medical facility until 2015, when services were relocated to RAF Leeming. However, an upgraded and brand new facility, known as the Catterick Integrated Care Centre is expected to open in 2026. Groundwork on the £55 million facility, a joint venture between the NHS and the Ministry of Defence, began in January 2024.

The local ambulances are run by the Yorkshire Ambulance Service, the town is also in the catchment area of the Great North Air Ambulance. North Yorkshire Police and the Royal Military Police have stations located on a shared complex while North Yorkshire Fire and Rescue provide firefighting services mainly from Colburn Fire Station (between the town and Colburn).

== Based units ==
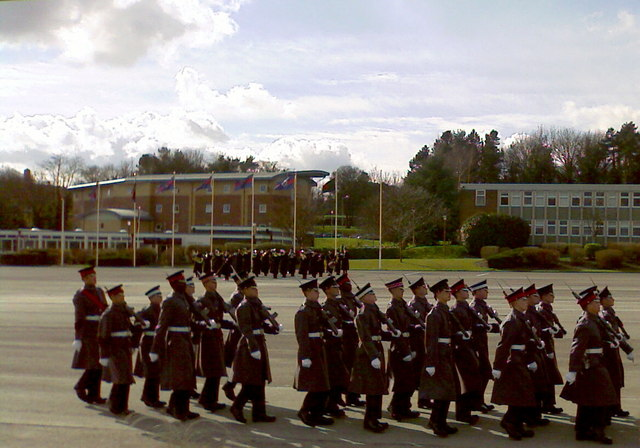
The parade ground at Helles Barracks

The garrison consists of many different groups of buildings spread over a wide area and includes a number of barracks, most of which are named after historical British Army battles, many of which took place in Northern France during the First World War. The current units based within Catterick Garrison include:

- Commander and Staff Trainer (North)
- Alma Lines
  - 1st Battalion, Royal Yorkshire Regiment
- Cambrai Lines
  - Royal Lancers (Queen Elizabeth's Own)
- Meggido Lines
  - 1st Close Support Battalion, Royal Electrical and Mechanical Engineers
- Piave Lines
  - 521 Explosive Ordnance Disposal and Search Squadron
  - British Army Bands Catterick, Royal Corps of Army Music
    - Band of the Royal Armoured Corps
    - Band of the King's Division
    - Band of the Royal Electrical and Mechanical Engineers
- Bourlon Barracks
  - Headquarters North
  - The Highlanders, 4th Battalion, Royal Regiment of Scotland
  - 1st Military Intelligence Battalion, Intelligence Corps
  - 1st Regiment, Royal Military Police
- Peronne Lines
  - Headquarters, 4th Light Brigade Combat Team
  - Headquarters, Catterick Garrison
- Gaza Barracks
  - The Light Dragoons
  - 3 Medical Regiment, Royal Army Medical Service
- Helles Barracks
  - Infantry Training Centre
- Marne Barracks
  - 5th Regiment, Royal Artillery
  - 32nd Engineer Regiment, Royal Engineers
- Somme Barracks
  - 1st Battalion, Scots Guards
- Vimy Barracks
  - Headquarters, School of Infantry
  - Infantry Training Centre
  - 3 Army Education Centre Group, Adjutant General's Corps

=== HQ School of Infantry, Infantry Training Centre ===
The Infantry Training Centre conducts infantry training combining Phase 1 and 2 of the Combat Infantryman's Course. Junior soldiers destined for the infantry continue to receive Phase 1 training at the Army Foundation College in Harrogate. ITC Catterick is the major user of the Warcop Training Area.

ITC Catterick is also home to the Army School of Ceremonial ('ASC'), where recruits learn to take part in the massed bands of the British Army. In 2016–17, the ASC moved from their former school (an old stately home) to modern facilities.

== Deaths and suicides ==
Between 1990 and June 2004, there were 27 non-combat-related deaths at Catterick Garrison. Between 1995 and 2003, 7 soldiers had been found hanged in Catterick Garrison, and another 6 soldiers had been killed by gunshot wounds.

In 1997, 18-year-old private Daniel Farr of the Prince of Wales's Own Regiment of Yorkshire died under mysterious circumstances in Catterick. His death was widely covered in British news media and led to the creation of the Daniel Trust.

In 2003, Lance Corporal Derek McGregor was found hanged in Catterick Camp. He reportedly left behind a note alleging that he was beaten up and his superiors failed to take action.

In 2004, the body of a 24-year-old soldier, Andrew John Browne, belonging to the Coldstream Guards was found in Catterick Camp.

In 2016, Adam Hosford died on his 25th birthday at Catterick Garrison.

In 2018 (sometimes reported as 2019) Alistair McLeish, an 18-year-old soldier of the Royal Regiment of Scotland, was found hanged in the Bourlon Barracks of Catterick Garrison.

In 2019, a soldier driving a Supacat Jackal in Catterick Camp died of brain injuries after crashing his vehicle. A jury-led inquest concluded that "a lack of supervision by chain of command and inadequate safety enforcement contributed to Sgt. McKelvie's death."

In 2020 the decomposing body of Royal Signals Lance Corporal Bernard Mongan was discovered at the barracks in Catterick, after an "unusual smell" was noticed coming from his room in the accommodation block. He had been missing for three weeks before his absence was noticed. Before his death, there had been reports that Mongan had suffered bullying from fellow soldiers.

In January 2020 a 57-year-old civilian contractor, Alistair Ferguson, was crushed to death by a Wolfhound troop carrier at Catterick Garrison.

In 2022, Nicholas (Nicki) Hart, a soldier of the Royal Regiment of Scotland, killed themselves in Catterick Garrison. That same year an 18-year-old soldier, Josh Kennington, died after collapsing during training at Catterick Garrison.

In 2022, two soldiers belonging to Catterick Garrison died on the same weekend in separate unrelated incidents.

In 2022 Lance Corporal Ryan Mackenzie, a veteran of the War in Afghanistan, was found dead in his barracks. His body had not been discovered until 6 days after his death when his friends called Catterick Garrison to alert them to his absence.

In 2023, another soldier based at Catterick Camp died from unknown circumstances while on a training exercise. In September 2023 an 8-year-old boy was killed at Catterick Garrison after being hit by a vehicle.

== See also ==
- Listed buildings in Colburn, North Yorkshire
- Listed buildings in Hipswell
