= Death of Daniel Farr =

1997 death of a British Army soldier

Daniel Farr was a British Army soldier who in 1997 died under mysterious circumstances in Catterick Garrison in North Yorkshire, England. His death was widely covered in British news media and led to the creation of the Daniel Trust.

== Service and death ==
Daniel Farr was a man from Driffield in East Yorkshire. He joined the Prince of Wales's Own Regiment of Yorkshire in June 1996.

In 1997 Farr suddenly died at the Infantry Training Centre, in Catterick Garrison. His death was suspected by his family to have been linked to the nuclear-biological-chemical warfare training which Farr had undertaken in the weeks prior to his death.

According to Farr's mother, he had been begging to leave the Army for months before his death, and that he was absent without leave a few days before his death.

== Legacy ==
After Farr's death, his family made connections with the relatives of other British soldiers who have died at Catterick Garrison and also the relatives of soldiers who died as part of the deaths at Deepcut army barracks, including the family of a British soldier whose corpse had been found in his barracks with two bullet wounds.

In 2005 it was reported that his family were calling for a public inquiry examining the British Army's non-combat deaths.

Farr's mother Lynn became an activist and founded the Daniel Trust in her son's memory. She also went onto become an anti-bullying campaigner.
