= Charles Lovett Gill =

English architect

Charles Lovett Gill FRIBA (1880–1960) was an English architect, born in Harbertonford, Devon, where his father was a Church of England Rector.

He was notable for his long-term partnership with Sir Albert Edward Richardson, with whom he was joint architect for the Duchy of Cornwall estate in Devon. The partnership did a lot of work in central London, and lasted from 1906 to 1939. He lived at The White House, Odiham, Hampshire, England.

He trained as an architect with E. G. Warren of Exeter, and he studied at the Royal Academy Schools. In 1904, he was the Ashpitel Prizeman (an annual architectural award in the name of Arthur Ashpitel) of the Royal Institute of British architects (RIBA), and was invested as a Fellow of the Royal Institute of British Architects in recognition for his contribution to architecture in England.

He was also a keen amateur violin player and maker, and collaborated with Lionel Tertis on the design and construction of his viola, though as FRICS he was only allowed to be recognised for his draughtsmanship.
