= Foxglove Covert =

Nature reserve in North Yorkshire, England

Foxglove Covert Local Nature Reserve
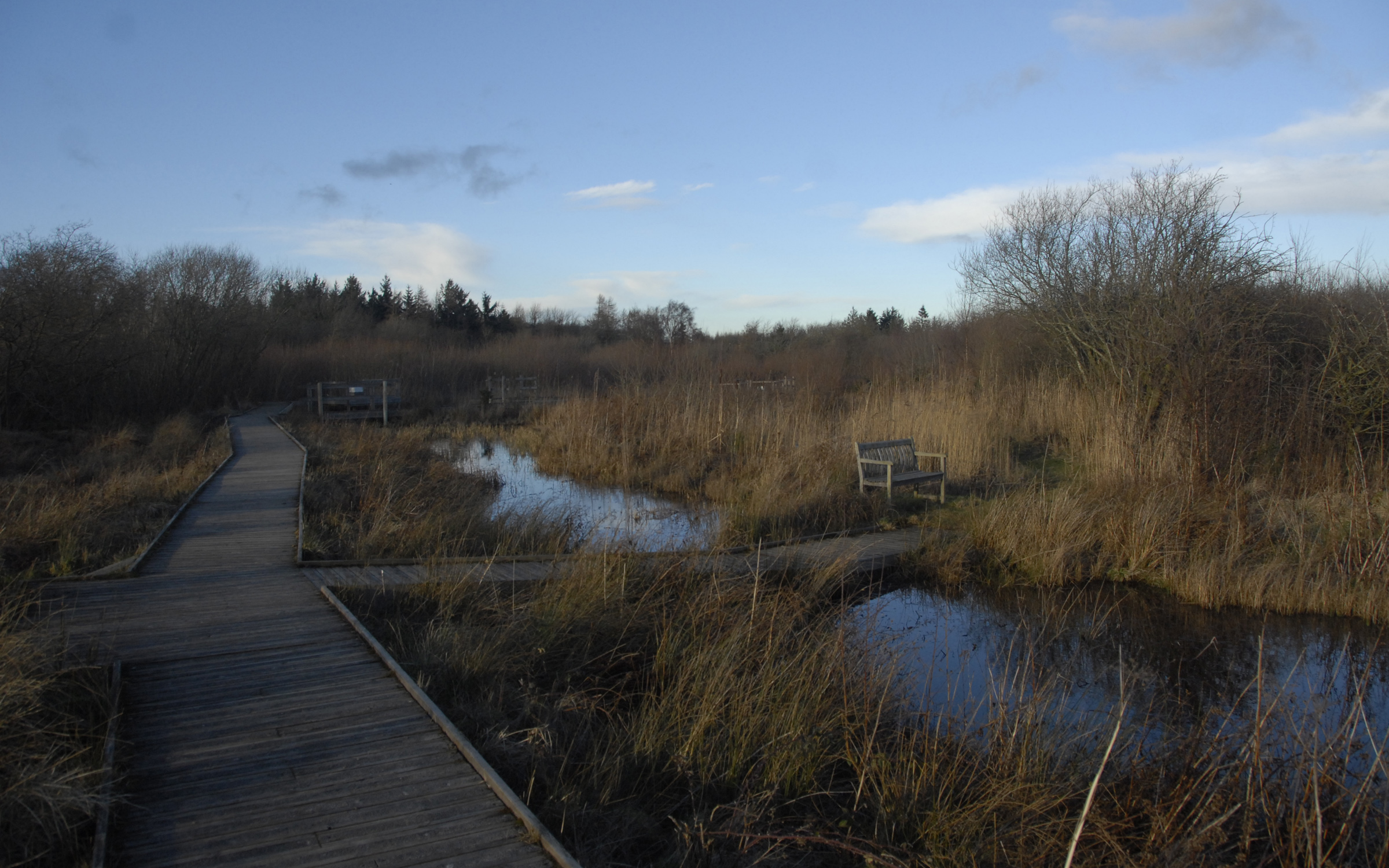
- Wetlands area at Foxglove Covert

- Location within North Yorkshire
- Location: Catterick Garrison, North Yorkshire, England
- Nearest town: Richmond
- Coordinates: 54°22′05.7″N 1°45′15.0″W
- Area: 100 acres (40 ha)
- Created: 1992
- Designated: 2001
- Visitors: 25,000 (in 2017)
- Open: 9:00 am–5:00 pm every day (except Christmas Day, Boxing Day and New Year's Day)
- Designation: Local Nature Reserve (LNR); Site of Local Nature Conservation Importance (SNCLI)
- Website: Official website

Foxglove Covert is a Local Nature Reserve (LNR) located on Catterick Garrison in North Yorkshire, England and is on the eastern edge of the Yorkshire Dales. The reserve was created in 1992 by The Royal Scots Dragoon Guards who had just returned from the First Gulf War. The reserve has been visited by royalty and has won many awards for its activities.

The site is on Ministry of Defence (MoD) land with access via security control on part of Catterick Camp. It was the first nature reserve in Richmondshire and was the first nature reserve with public access on MoD land.

== History ==
In the 1970s, due to an upsurge in terrorism, security was upgraded and razor wire was installed around the perimeter of Catterick Garrison. A section across the north western edge of the camp was bypassed because of its undulating nature. The section was an area of foxholes, slit trenches and gullies that were designed to test tank crews as part of their training. This small area was overgrown and had many moorland streams that came together to form Leadmill and Risedale Becks flowing through it. In 1992, Major Tony Crease of The Royal Scots Dragoon Guards, realised the potential of the site and was granted 28 acres (11 ha) by the British Army to convert into a nature reserve. Crease made use of soldiers who were able to volunteer and also use their earthmoving equipment to help out. In April 2001, the site was designated as a Local Nature Reserve by Natural England which afforded it a protected and legal designation. In the same year it was designated as a Site of Local Nature Conservation Importance (SLNCI).

In 2014, due to security concerns, it was proposed to create a new access road that would still cross Army land, but would mean that visitors would not need to go through the security at the gate. The downside to the plan was that the new access road would be at least a 4-mile (6.4 km) diversion and would cross an active training area where soldiers would be using blank ammunition.

In 2015, it was revealed that the MoD had withdrawn plans for the access road and had forwarded a grant to the reserve. The reserve was accredited with The Flagship Pond Scheme which only recognises the very best ponds across England and Wales. In 2016, Tony Robinson visited the reserve as part of his Coast to Coast programme and helped to provide a timber island for waterfowl and observed ringing of birds on site by the British Trust for Ornithology. The vast range of bird species that inhabit or visit the reserve makes it ideal for bird ringing; only one other site across the British Isles has data that surpasses that gathered at Foxglove Covert for time and consistency. In its first twenty years, the reserve noted, detailed and ringed over 90,000 birds.

In 2017, after being open for 25 years, the reserve won the Environmental Project Award as given out by the Ministry of Defence and Sanctuary Magazine.

The local MP at the time of its creation, William Hague, was a keen supporter of the reserve and his successor, Rishi Sunak is also a patron of the site and writes about the reserve often in the local press. In June 2021, the staff at the reserve were given the Queen's Award for Voluntary Service.

== Description ==
The reserve is accessed through Cambrai Lines gate at Catterick Garrison, which is guarded by The Royal Lancers. Between 20,000 and 25,000 visitors come each year specifically for the reserve and by the end of 2017, the reserve had recorded over 770,000 visitors in its 25-year history. Foxglove Covert now covers over 100 acres (40 ha) and includes heathland, wetland, moorland, flower-rich grassland and ancient deciduous woodland.

The reserve also includes a £350,000 field centre, built in 2002, that has classrooms and bird-ringing rooms with one way glass so as not to disturb the wildlife outside. The centre also has an observation bee hive that can be viewed through clear plexiglass and the local beekeeping association then sells some of the honey produced. They also promote beekeeping by running courses throughout the year to new, novice and experienced beekeepers. The reserve is noted as a specialist centre for bird preservation.

In May 2016, a "quasi Neolithic edifice" of 13 stones was built on part of the moorland trail. The stones were donated by a local quarry based in Leyburn and the design is meant to replicate a clock face. The 69-foot (21 m) circle has four major keystones, at the cardinal points of a compass, with smaller stones occupying the rest of the points with a larger stone in the middle.

In the summer of 2019, a new pond was created to entice wading birds and associated wildlife. The man-made pond was christened Spigot Mere after a Second World War mortar shell (known as a Spigot) was uncovered during the excavations for the pond.

== Species list ==
The reserve is home to over 2,600 species of fauna, flora invertebrate and vertebrates. Whilst Foxglove Covert does not have a unique species, it is home to some endangered and rare species, a selection of which are listed below.

- Great crested newts
- Water vole - 100 voles were reintroduced in 2007
- European Otter - observed on Risedale Beck as it flows through the reserve
- Pillwort
- Marsh stitchwort
- Pond mud snail - listed as endangered at IUCN

== Gallery ==
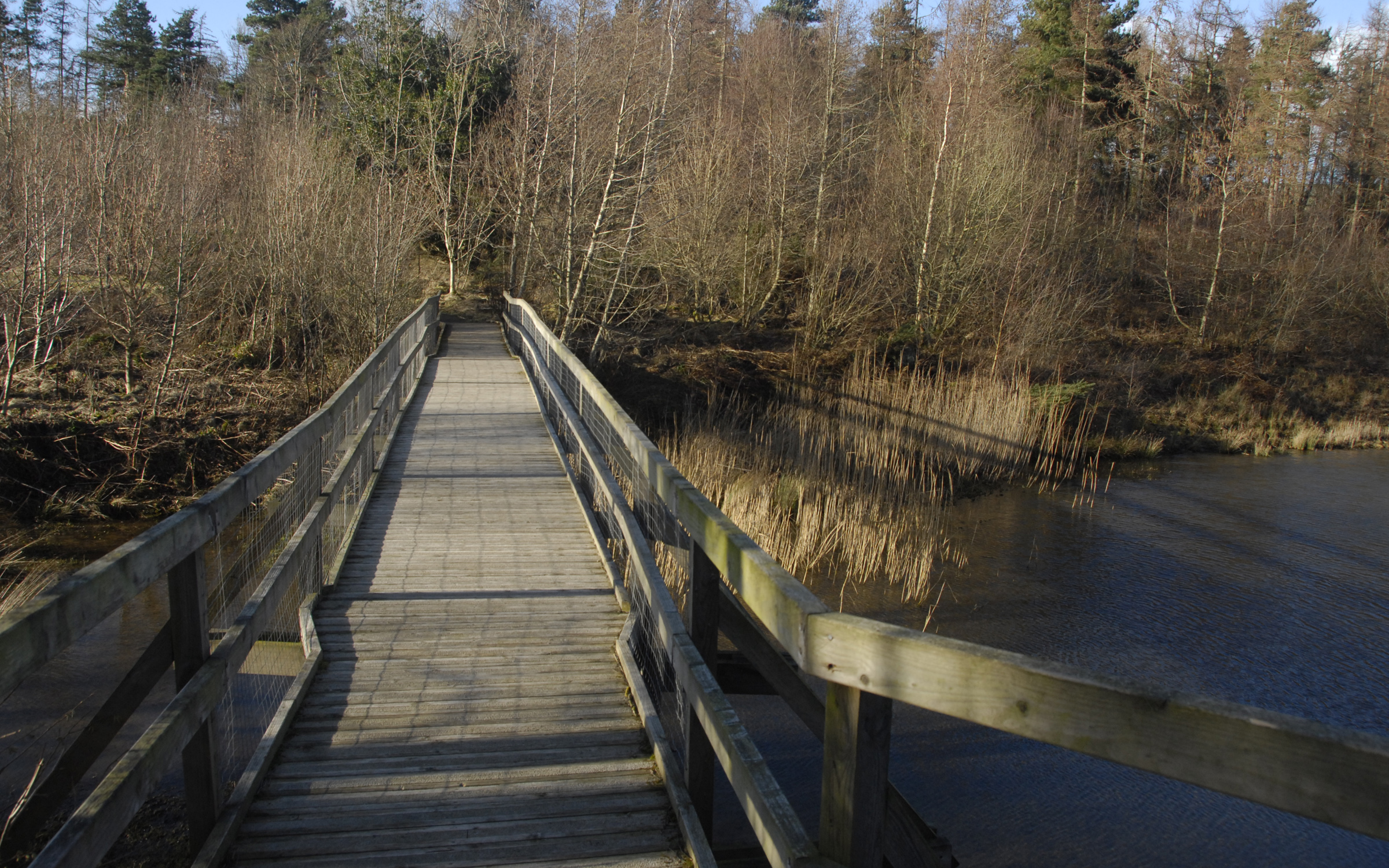
Bridge at Foxglove Covert

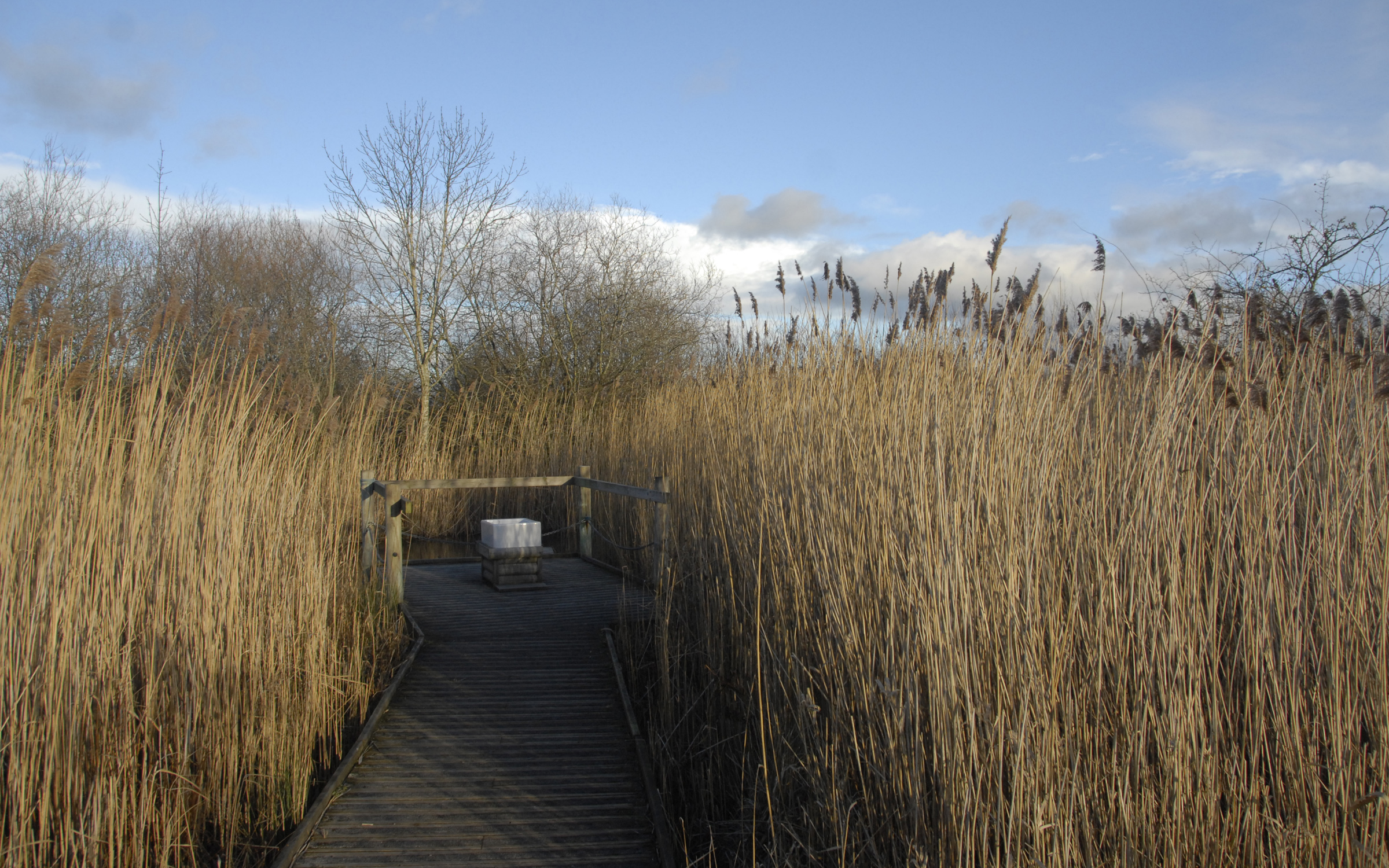
Education space in the wetlands area

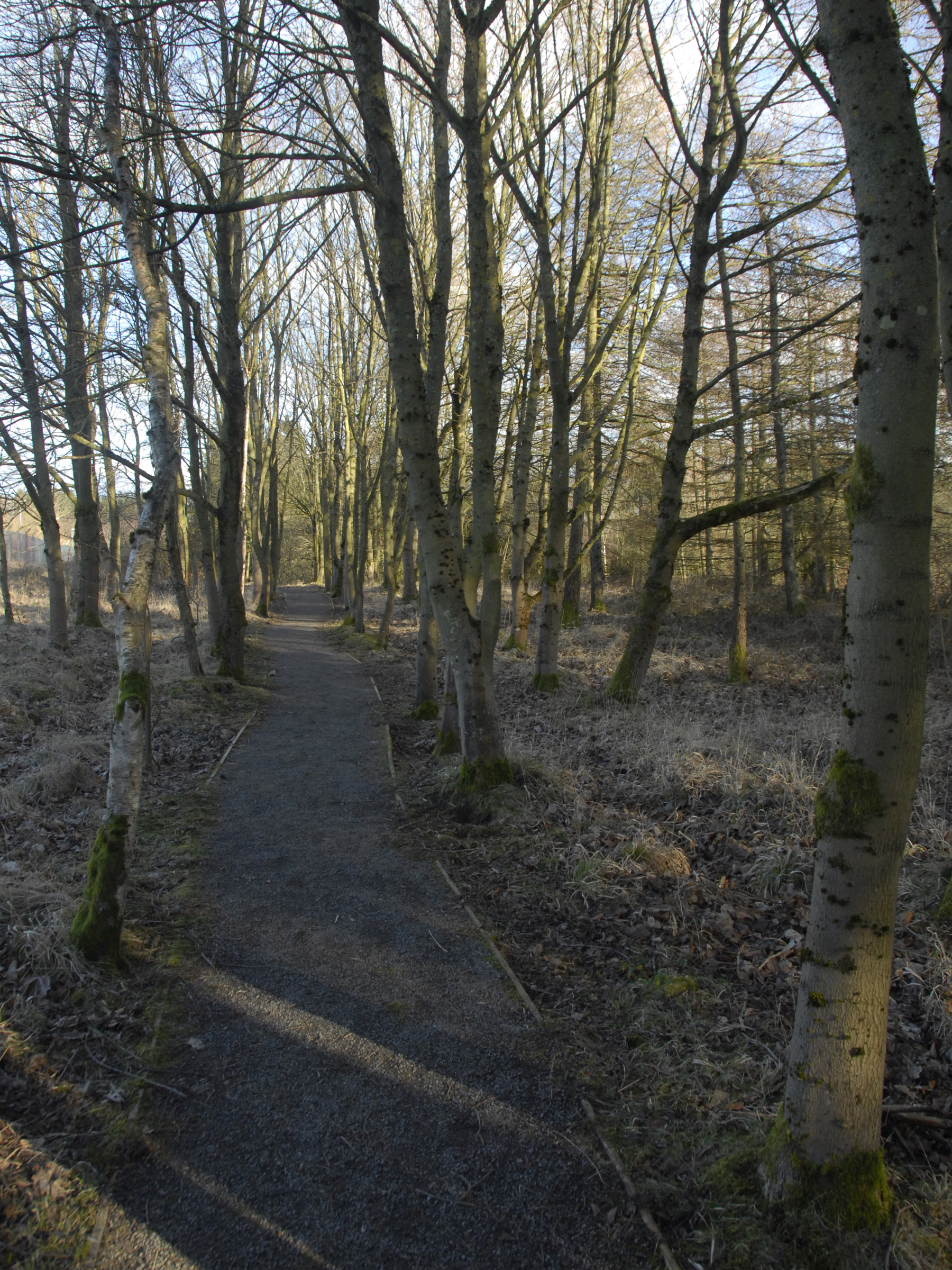
Path at Foxglove Covert

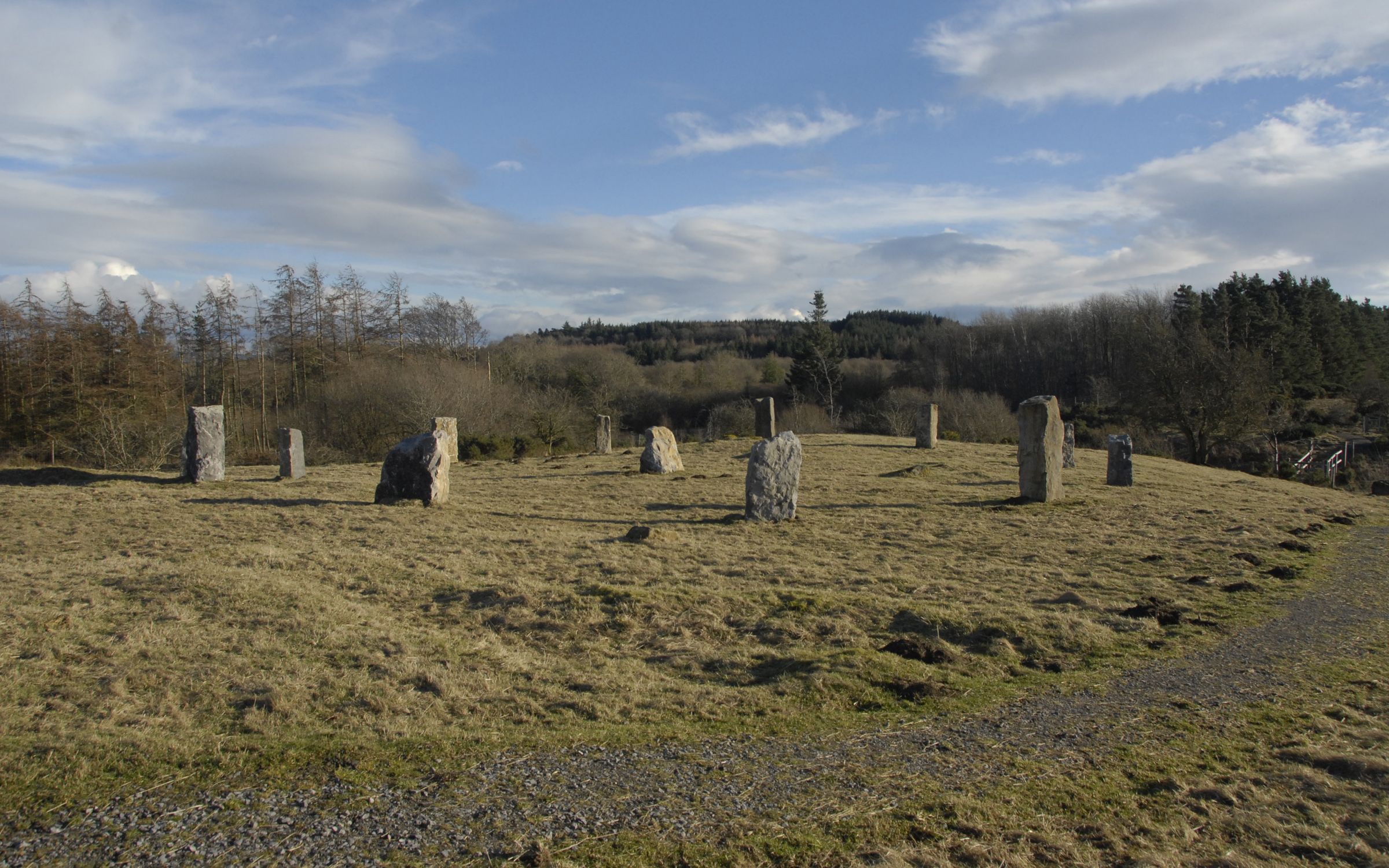
Stone Circle on Moorland walk at Foxglove Covert - not a historical monument; a 21st-century addition

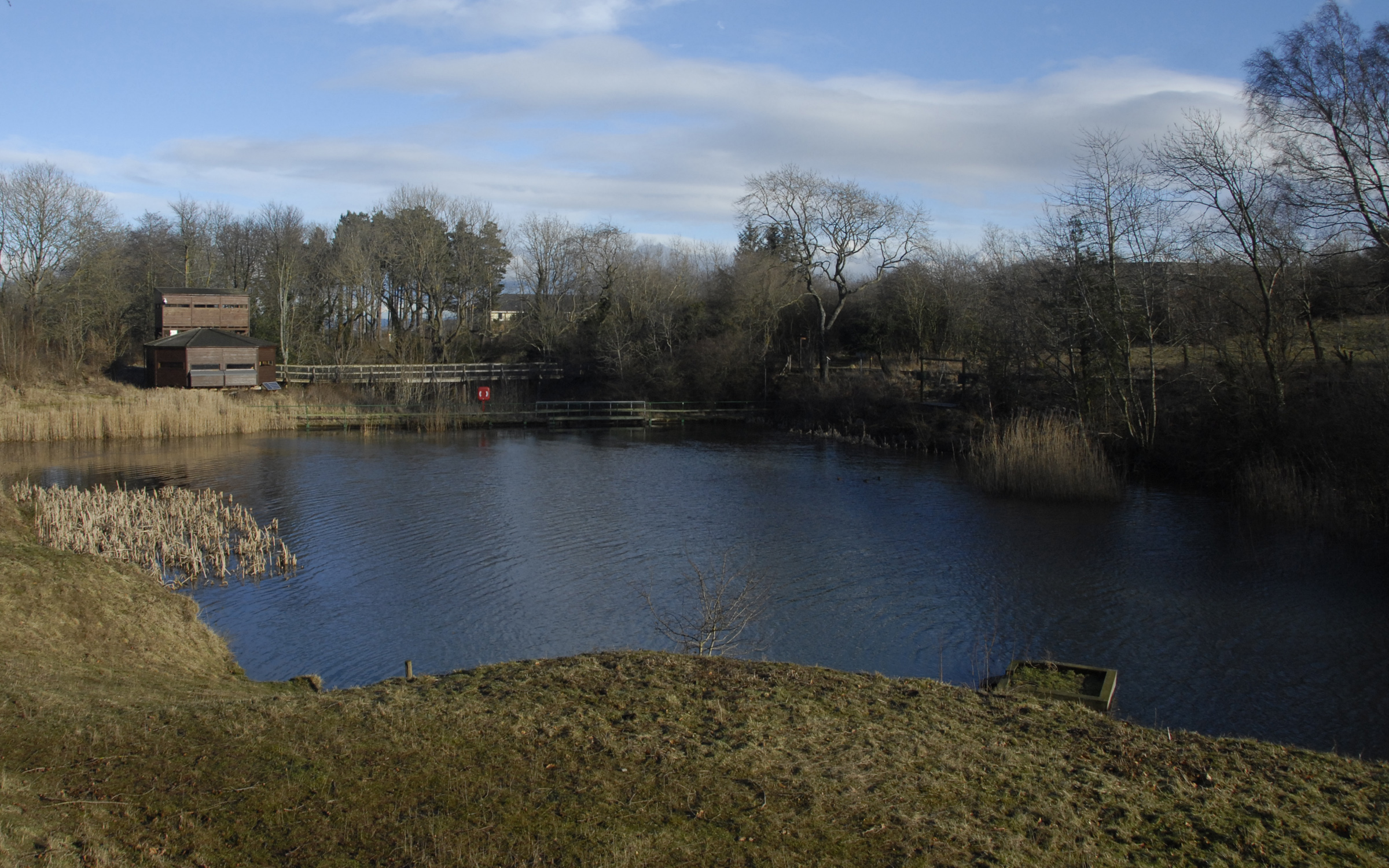
The main pond and bird hide at Foxglove Covert
