= Duchess of Kent Military Hospital =

- Shown in North Yorkshire

Geography
- Location: Horne Road, Catterick Garrison, North Yorkshire, England
- Coordinates: 54.3739°N 1.7083°W

Organisation
- Care system: NHS

Services
- Emergency department: No

History
- Founded: 1976
- Closed: 1999

Links
- Lists: Hospitals in England

The Duchess of Kent Military Hospital was an army hospital and nurse training facility in Catterick Garrison, North Yorkshire, England.

== History ==
The Duchess of Kent Military Hospital (DKMH) was opened in 1976 at a cost of £3 million, general hospital services were stopped on 1 July 1999, however it was still used as a medical facility until 2015, when services were relocated to RAF Leeming.
