= Colburn Hall =

Historic building in Colburn, North Yorkshire, England

Coordinates: 54°23′17″N 1°41′58″W

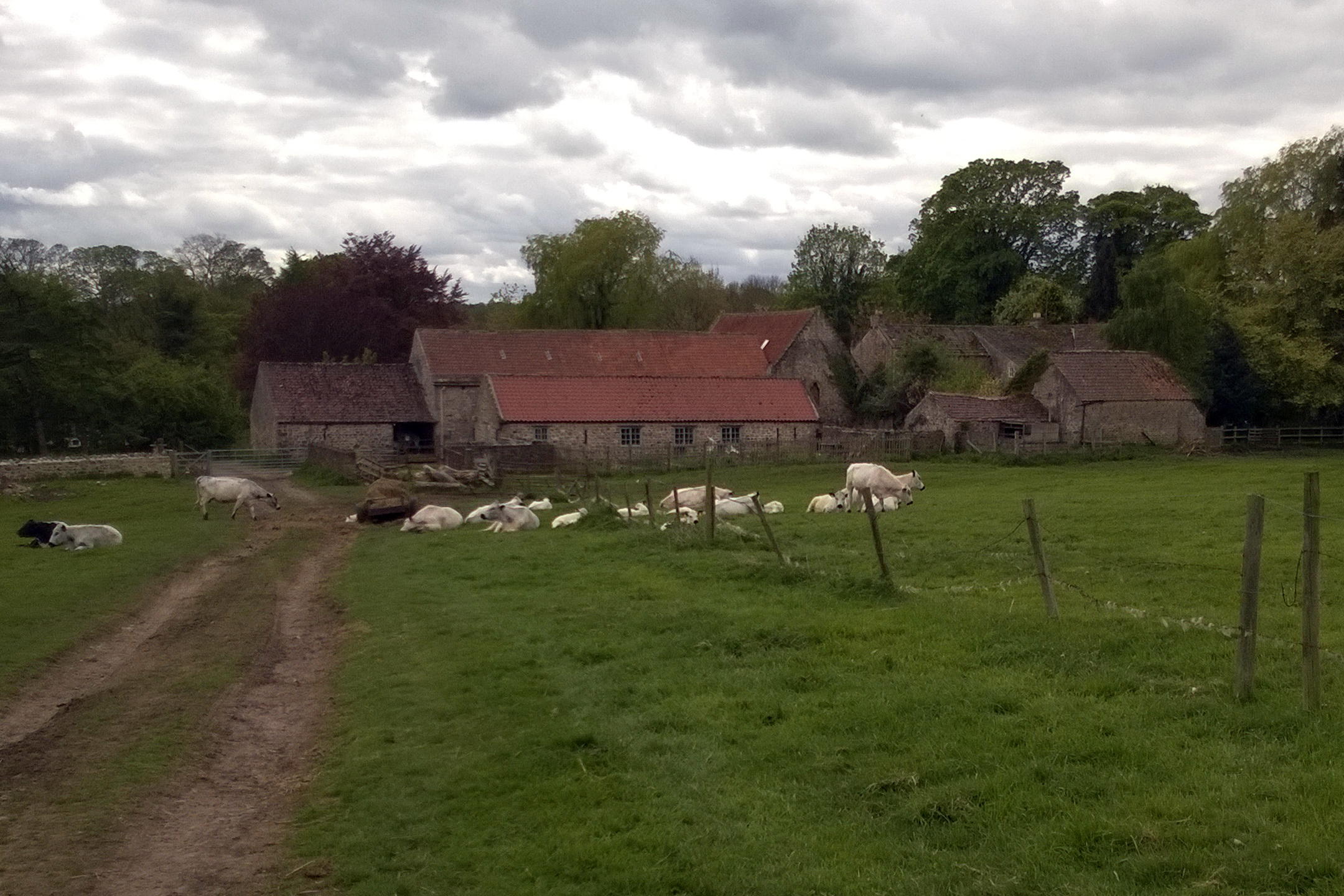
The hall and outbuildings. The hall is at the rear right, and the courthouse is to its left

Colburn Hall is a historic building in Colburn, North Yorkshire, a village in England.

The oldest part of the complex is a hall with an undercroft, now known as the courthouse, which was constructed in about 1300. About 50 years later, another two-storey block was constructed; this now forms the cross-wing of the hall. It is possible that the two structures were linked by a central range, probably built of timber; or alternatively, that they were separate but associated buildings. If a central range did exist, it was demolished before 1718, the date of a surviving sketch showing the current arrangement. In 1662, a new range was added to the west cross-wing, which was thereafter used as the new Colburn Hall, by the D'Arcy family. It was later used as a farmhouse, and was Grade II* listed in 1951. The courthouse had its roof rebuilt, and a barn was built onto it. The building itself was later used as a barn, with the ground floor used for stabling by the 19th century. The courthouse was Grade I listed in 1969. It was added to the Heritage at Risk register in 2000, at which time it was disused, but it was restored in 2010.

The hall is built of stone, with quoins, and a stone slate roof with stone copings, shaped kneelers, and finials. It has two storeys, and a T-shaped plan, with a front range of four bays, and a rear outshut. The doorway has a slightly chamfered surround and a hood mould, above which is a carved coat of arms. The windows vary, and include sashes and casements, some with mullions. Inside, there is an 18th-century stone surround for a range.

The courthouse is also built of stone, with quoins, and a pantile roof with stone slates at the eaves, raised verges with moulded coping, and finials. There are two storeys, consisting of a first-floor hall and an undercroft, and five bays. It contains doorways and windows of various types, and retains an early fireplace in the east wall of the upper floor.

== See also ==
- Grade II* listed buildings in North Yorkshire (district)
- Listed buildings in Colburn, North Yorkshire
