= Risedale School =

Location
- Hipswell, North Yorkshire, DL9 4BD; England
- Coordinates: 54.378279°N 1.714941°W

Information
- Type: Community school
- Motto: "A family of learners"
- Local authority: North Yorkshire
- Department for Education URN: 121663 Tables
- Ofsted: Reports
- Head teacher: Lucy Greenwood
- Age: 11 to 16
- Enrolment: 553
- Website: www.risedale.org.uk

Risedale School (formerly Risedale Sports and Community College) is a coeducational secondary school situated in Hipswell, Catterick Garrison, North Yorkshire, England.

It is a community school administered by North Yorkshire Council.

The headteacher of Risedale School is Lucy Greenwood.

The school's original name was Catterick Camp County Modern School, and it was a secondary modern school.
