= North Riding County Football Association =

Sport governing body in Yorkshire, Northern England

- Former logo

- Area covered in red
- Abbreviation: North Riding FA
- Formation: 1881
- Purpose: Football association
- Headquarters: Stokesley, Yorkshire
- Location: North Riding of Yorkshire
- Coordinates: 54.468783°N 1.17923°W
- CEO: Steven Wade
- Website: Official website

The North Riding County Football Association, also known as the North Riding FA, is the football governing body for the North Riding of Yorkshire. Its headquarters are located in the town of Stokesley, 7 miles (11 km) south of Middlesbrough, England.

Affiliated members pay a fee commensurate with the level of competition they play in. Affiliated members benefit from access to support and guidance on such areas as health and safety and access to finance or grants. The County FA is directly responsible for the governance of County Cup competitions.

== Membership ==
Clubs located within the geographical area of the old North Riding of Yorkshire boundaries are eligible for affiliation to the Association, including those participating at the higher levels of the Football League System in England; until 1901 the association had a more limited geographical spread and was known as the Cleveland Football Association, changing its name in September that year to the North Riding of Yorkshire and Teesside Football Association. Clubs who enter teams into Saturday and Sunday competitions are required to have a separate affiliation for each. The Association consists of two District Associations and six Saturday and Sunday leagues covering the old North Riding of Yorkshire, as well as eight Junior leagues and three Women & Girls leagues.

Governing council membership of the County FA is allocated between five geographic divisions, proportion of councillors in each is determined by the relative size of each division. The divisions are Whitby to Redcar with 3 members; Grangetown to Thornaby with 4 members; Northallerton and Dales with 2 members; Scarborough & District Association with 1 member and the York & District Association with 2 members.

== Affiliated leagues ==
=== Saturday leagues ===
The Saturday leagues are listed below with the relevant level in the English football league system shown in brackets where applicable. Each of the leagues run their own cup competitions.

- Northern Football League - Division 1 (L9), Division 2 (L10)
- North Riding Football League - Premier (L11), Division 1 (L12)
- York Football League - Premier Division (L14), Division 1 (L15), Division 2 (L16), Division 3 (L17), Division 4 (L18), Reserve A, Reserve B, Reserve C.
- Beckett Football League - Division 1, Division 2
- Scarborough & District League - Division 1, Division 2, Division 3
- Wensleydale Creamery Football League - Division 1
- North East Christian Fellowship League

=== Sunday leagues ===
- Langbaurgh Sunday League - 2 Divisions
- Redcar Sunday League - 2 Divisions (No longer Running)
- York Sunday Morning League - 4 Divisions
- Scarborough and District Sunday League - 3 Divisions
- Teesborough Football League - 2 Divisions
- Black Sheep Brewery Hambleton Football Combination - 3 Divisions
- Claro Sunday League
- Stockton Sunday League

=== Youth leagues ===
- York & District Youth Football League
- Teesside Junior Football Alliance
- Wensleydale Junior Football League
- Cleveland Youth Football League
- Scarborough & District Minor League
- Harrogate & District Junior League
- YMSV York Minor League
- Hambleton & Richmondshire Junior Football League

=== Women's and girls' leagues ===
- North Riding Women's Football League
- Tees Valley Girls League
- City of York Girls Football League
- Harrogate & District Junior Girls League
- North Riding & Tees Valley Girls League

=== Other leagues ===
- Play Football York - for 5, 6 & 7-a-side teams

== County FA competitions ==
All affiliated clubs of the County FA are required by Rule 18 of the Membership Rules to enter at least one of the County FA Cup competitions. There is a financial penalty if an exemption is applied for by any affiliated member.

=== North Riding Senior Cup ===
Any team that has entered a Football Association competition such as the Challenge Cup, F.A. Trophy or F.A. Vase must enter the Senior Cup. The Senior Cup was first competed for in 1881 as the Cleveland Cup mostly by clubs from the Middlesbrough area. The first winners were Middlesbrough, who were also the first winners of the competition in 1902 when it was renamed to the current one. Middlesbrough have won the competition fifty four times, which is the most by any team, their last success being in 2017–18. The current holders are Whitby Town who defeated Boro Rangers 5-1 in the 2024 final.

=== Other Cup competitions ===
==== Adult ====
- North Riding Saturday Cup - current holders are Boro Rangers U23 who won the 2024 competition by defeating Fishburn Park 8-7 on penalties after a 3-3 draw in regulation play.
- North Riding Sunday Cup - current holders are Wigginton Grasshoppers who won the 2024 competition by defeating Haxby Town 4-2.
- North Riding Saturday Challenge Cup - current holders are Edgehill who won the 2024 competition by defeating Carperby Rovers 4-0, retaining the title following their victory in 2023.
- North Riding Sunday Challenge Cup - current holders are Fox Covert FC who won the 2024 competition by defeating Thornaby Roundel 3-2, retaining the title following their victory in 2023.
- North Riding Women's Senior Cup - current holders are York City Ladies who won the 2024 competition by defeating Thornaby Town Ladies 10-0.

==== Junior Cup competitions ====
- Junior Cup - U11 - current holders are Boro Rangers. who won the 2015 final defeating Grangetown Boys Club 3–1. There has been no competition since this one.
- Junior Cup - U12 - current holders are Kader FC U12 who won the 2024 Final defeating Boro Rangers U12 Oranges 3-2.
- Junior Cup - U13 - current holders are Riverside Juniors U13 Rangers who won the 2024 competition by defeating T.I.B.S U13 Blues 6-0.
- Junior Cup - U14 - current holders are Marton U14 Blues who won the 2024 final defeating Boro Rangers U14 Oranges 2-0.
- Junior Cup - U15 - current holders are Boro Rangers U15 Whites who won the 2024 competition by defeating Marton Juniors U15 Blues 4-0.
- Junior Cup - U16 - current holders are Whinney Banks U16 who won the 2024 Final defeating Boro Rangers U16 Reds 2-0.
- Junior Cup - U19 - current holders are Guisborough Town U17 Reds who won the 2024 competition by defeating Nunthorpe Athletic JFC U17 1-0.
- Junior Girls Cup - U12 - current holders are Boro Rangers Girls U12 Reds who won the 2024 competition by defeating Middlesbrough Girls U12 3-0.
- Junior Girls Cup - U13 - current holders are Boro Rangers Girls U13 Blues who won the 2024 competition by defeating Boro Rangers Girls U12 Durham 13-0.
- Junior Girls Cup - U14 - current holders are York City Foundation Girls U14 who won the 2024 competition by defeating Boro Rangers Girls U14 Durham 6-0.
- Junior Girls Cup - U15 - current holders are Thornaby Town U15 Girls who won the 2024 competition by defeating York Railway Institute U15 Girls 8-0.
- Junior Girls Cup - U16 - current holders are York City Foundation RTC U16 Girls who won the 2024 competition by defeating Wigginton Grasshoppers U16 Girls Whites 13–1.
