= Hipswell =

Village and civil parish in North Yorkshire, England

Coordinates: 54°22′45″N 1°42′42″W

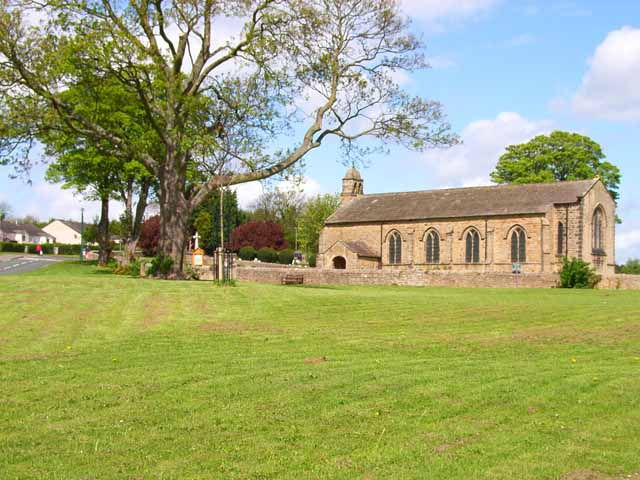
- Hipswell parish church

- Location within North Yorkshire
- Population: 5,388 (2011 census)
- OS grid reference: SE183983
- Civil parish: Hipswell
- Unitary authority: North Yorkshire
- Ceremonial county: North Yorkshire
- Region: Yorkshire and the Humber
- Country: England
- Sovereign state: United Kingdom
- Post town: CATTERICK GARRISON
- Postcode district: DL9
- Dialling code: 01748
- Police: North Yorkshire
- Fire: North Yorkshire
- Ambulance: Yorkshire
- UK Parliament: Richmond and Northallerton

Hipswell is a village and civil parish in the county of North Yorkshire. The civil parish mainly comprises the northern part of Catterick Garrison. The village of Hipswell is at the eastern end of the civil parish, and effectively forms a suburb of Catterick Garrison.

== History ==
Hipswell was mentioned in the Domesday Book in 1086 as being in the hundred of "Land of Count Alan" and the county of Yorkshire, the population was estimated at 6 households. In the 1320s it was the birthplace of noted English theologian John Wycliffe, leader of the Lollard Movement.

Hipswell was historically a township in the ancient parish of Catterick in the North Riding of Yorkshire. In 1870-72 John Marius Wilson's Imperial Gazetteer of England and Wales described Hipswell as:

a township and a chapelry in Richmond district, N. R. Yorkshire. The township lies on Rysdale beck, near its influx to the Swale, and near the Richmond railway, 2 miles SE of Richmond; and is in the parish of Catterick. Acres, 2, 785. Real property, £2, 768. Pop., 260. Houses, 53.

Situated close to the church, Hipswell Hall is a 15th-century manor house, with alterations dated 1596 with the initials "GW" for George Wandesford, possibly originally part of a fortified house, built for the Fulthorpe family.

== Governance ==
Hipswell lies within the Richmond and Northallerton parliamentary constituency, which is under the control of the Conservative Party. The current Member of Parliament, since the 2015 general election, is Rishi Sunak. An electoral ward in the same name exists; this ward stretches north almost to Richmond with a total population taken at the 2011 census of 5,610.

From 1974 to 2023 it was part of the district of Richmondshire, it is now administered by the unitary North Yorkshire Council.

== Community and culture ==
Hipswell Church of England Primary School which caters for nearly 200 pupils, is the local primary education provider, Risedale School is also located in Hipswell, which provides secondary and further education for the surrounding Garrison area. The village hall was originally built in 1919, but was re-erected in 1929 after a fire.

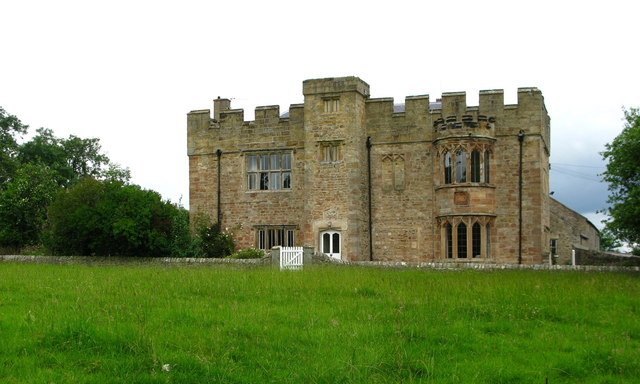
Hipswell Hall

=== Religion ===
Hipswell ecclesiastical parish is formed by the villages of Hipswell with Colburn and Scotton. The parish church is the Church of St. John the Evangelist, on Hipswell Road.

Hipswell churchyard was the initial burial ground for soldiers from Catterick Garrison and its Military Hospital in the First World War. It contains the war graves of 64 service personnel from that war and of 2 British soldiers from the Second World War. A screen wall lists those whose graves are not marked by headstones. In 1930, on the churchyard's northern boundary, Catterick Garrison Cemetery was opened by the War Office as a purpose-made cemetery for the camp. This includes war graves of 42 Commonwealth service personnel and some Polish service personnel of the Second World War. A Cross of Sacrifice stands at the boundary of the two burial grounds.

== See also ==
- Listed buildings in Hipswell
