= Angram =

Angram is a common place-name in Yorkshire, England. It may refer to:

- Angram, Long Marston, a village in the parish of Long Marston near York, North Yorkshire
- Angram, a former settlement in the parish of Stonebeck Up, Nidderdale, in the Yorkshire Dales, North Yorkshire
  - Angram Reservoir
- Angram, Muker, a village near Keld in North Yorkshire
  - Angram Bottoms
- Angram Grange, a civil parish near Coxwold in North Yorkshire
