= West Stonesdale =

Hamlet in North Yorkshire, England

Coordinates: 54.415°N 2.175°W

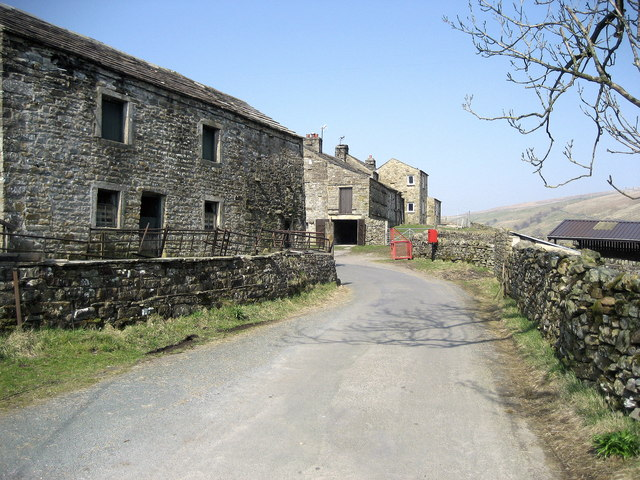
- West Stonesdale

- Location within North Yorkshire
- OS grid reference: NY8802
- Civil parish: Muker
- Unitary authority: North Yorkshire
- Ceremonial county: North Yorkshire
- Region: Yorkshire and the Humber
- Country: England
- Sovereign state: United Kingdom
- Post town: RICHMOND
- Postcode district: DL11
- Dialling code: 01748
- Police: North Yorkshire
- Fire: North Yorkshire
- Ambulance: Yorkshire
- UK Parliament: Richmond and Northallerton

West Stonesdale is a hamlet in the Yorkshire Dales, North Yorkshire, England. The secluded village is near Keld to the south, Tan Hill to the north and is both 10 miles (16 km) from Grinton (west north west) and Askrigg (north west). The small valley that cuts south from Tan Hill to West Stonesdale is also known as West Stonesdale (or West Stones Dale) and carries Stonesdale Beck 4 miles (7 km) south to the River Swale. A road heads north from the B6270 through West Stonesdale to Tan Hill. Where the road diverges from the B6270 is the site of Currack Force, a waterfall on Stonesdale Beck which drops 23 feet (7 m) before entering the Swale.

West Stonesdale used to be in the ecclesiastical parish of Grinton, but now forms part of the civil parish of Muker. From 1974 to 2023 it was part of the district of Richmondshire, it is now administered by the unitary North Yorkshire Council.

The Pennine Way is to the east of the hamlet on the far side of Stonesdale Beck. To the north, just before Startindale Gill becomes Stonedale Beck is West Stonesdale Lead Mine, which between 1850 and 1861 was operated by Christopher Lonsdale Bradley. The site of the mine and its associated workings are now listed as a scheduled monument. Coal was also mined above West Stonesdale, with Stonesdale Moor being dotted with former pit workings. Coal was mined as far back as 1384 and was transported to Richmond in the east. The coal was poor quality by comparison to other sources, but the industry was important enough in the area to warrant a turnpike road being built from Tan Hill down through Arkengarthdale.

== See also ==
- Listed buildings in Muker
