= Listed buildings in Muker =

Muker is a civil parish in the county of North Yorkshire, England. It contains 51 listed buildings that are recorded in the National Heritage List for England. Of these, two are listed at Grade II*, the middle of the three grades, and the others are at Grade II, the lowest grade. The parish is in Upper Swaledale and it contains the small settlements of Muker, Angram, Ivelet, Keld, Satron, Thwaite, West Stonesdale and Birkdale, isolated farmsteads, and the surrounding countryside and moorland. Most of the listed buildings are farmhouses and farm buildings, houses, cottages and associated structures. The others include a church and a chapel, items in the churchyard, bridges, a public house, limekilns, boundary stones, two institutes, and four telephone kiosks.

== Key ==
Grade	Criteria
II*	Particularly important buildings of more than special interest
II	Buildings of national importance and special interest

== Buildings ==
Name and location	Photograph	Date	Notes	Grade
Coffin stone northeast of Ivelet Bridge; 54.37593°N 2.10446°W	—	Medieval	The coffin stone is a stone slab. It is set in verge beside carriageway of Ivelet Bridge.	II
Ivelet Bridge; 54.37571°N 2.10455°W		Late 16th century	The bridge carries a road over the River Swale. It is in stone, and consists of a single semicircular arch of voussoirs, surmounted by smaller stones forming a hood mould. The parapets have segmental coping, and they curve round at the northeast corner.	II*
St Mary's Church; 54.37635°N 2.13922°W		1580	The church has been altered and extended through the centuries, including a restored in 1891. It is built in stone with a stone slate roof, and consists of a nave and chancel under one roof, a south porch, and a west tower. The tower has three stages, quoins, clock faces, two-light bell openings, and an embattled parapet with corner pinnacles. On the porch is a sundial, and the inner doorway has a four-centred arch.	II*
Old font 54.37625°N 2.13923°W		1580 (possible)	The font is in the churchyard of St Mary's Church, to the south of the church. It is in stone, and has a square base, an octagonal shaft, and a small circular bowl.	II
Rash Grange; 54.37248°N 2.12485°W	—	Late 17th century	A house and cottage, later a farmhouse, in stone with a stone slate roof. There are two storeys and five bays. On the front are a doorway to the left, and a gabled porch to the right. There is one fire window, and the other windows are mullioned, some with hood moulds.	II
Former house and cottage east of Rash View; 54.37253°N 2.12320°W	—	Late 17th century	The buildings, later used as farm buildings, are in stone, with stone slate roofs, and two storeys. The house has quoins, and a rear outshut, and contains a stable door and mullioned windows, with some mullions missing. The cottage on the left dates from the 18th century, and has a doorway with interrupted jambs and a sash window, and on the upper floor is a square window.	II
Stone House and barn 54.40347°N 2.21957°W	—	Late 17th century	Two houses, later combined, and a barn, in stone, with a stone slate roof and a shaped kneeler on the right, and two storeys. The middle house has three bays and a central doorway with a chamfered quoined surround, a lintel with a triangular soffit, and above is a slab hood mould. The windows are mullioned, with some mullions missing and some windows blocked. The house to the right has three bays, and a central gabled porch containing a doorway with a moulded chamfered quoined surround and a hood mould. The windows are a mix of sashes and fire windows. The taller barn to the left has a cart opening and a doorway with impost jambs, over which is an initialled and dated stone.	II
Oxnop Hall; 54.37198°N 2.10775°W		1685 or earlier	A farmhouse in stone on a boulder plinth, with sandstone dressings, quoins and a stone slate roof with stone copings and shaped kneelers. There are two storeys, five bays, and a rear stair turret. On the front is a two-storey gabled porch containing a basket-arched doorway with a moulded chamfered surround, a dated and initialled lintel, and a hood mould, above which is an inscribed and dated panel. On the front are fire windows and a single-light window, and the other windows are mullioned or mullioned and transomed with hood moulds.	II*
Cow byre southeast of West Calverts House; 54.37744°N 2.11704°W	—	1696	The cow byre with a hayloft above is in stone and has a stone slate roof with shaped kneelers and stone copings. There are two storeys, two bays, and two leantos. The building contains a board door and single-light windows with chamfered surrounds on the front. In the rear is a board door with a chamfer quoined surround, and a dated and initialled lintel. External steps lead up to the hayloft.	II
West View Cottage; 54.41408°N 2.17462°W	—	Late 17th to early 18th century	Two houses combined into one, in stone, with a stone slate roof. There are two storeys and three bays. In the centre is a doorway, to its right are a nine-pane window and a fire window with chamfered surrounds, all under a continuous hood mould. To the left is a blocked doorway and two windows, and on the upper floor are fire windows, one blocked, and a two-light mullioned window with casements.	II
Aygill Farmhouse; 54.39744°N 2.17214°W		Early 18th century	A farmhouse and a cottage under one roof, in rendered stone, with quoins, and a stone slate roof with shaped kneelers and stone coping. There are two storeys, the house has four bays, and the cottage has two. The house contains a central doorway, a fixed light window, sashes and a fire window. The cottage has a plain doorway and similar windows.	II
Crow Trees; 54.37199°N 2.11676°W		Early 18th century	A farmhouse and a cottage to the left in stone, with stone gutter brackets, and a stone slate roof. There are two storeys, and each part has two bays. On the front of the farmhouse is a gabled porch, and to the right is a doorway with a chamfered quoined surround. Between them is a casement window with a moulded chamfered surround, and to the left is a two-light mullioned window. The windows on the upper floor are sashes. The cottage, dating from the late 18th century, has quoins, a doorway and sash windows.	II
Gill Head; 54.36686°N 2.10407°W	—	Early 18th century	A farmhouse, stable and byre under one roof, in stone with a stone slate roof and two storeys. The house has two bays, and a porch and a doorway with a plain surround, above which is an initialled panel. There is one single-light window, and the other windows are mullioned. To the left is a cart shed with doors under a segmental arch of sandstone voussoirs. The stable has a doorway with impost jambs, and steps lead up to a hayloft door with interrupted jambs.	II
High Smithy Holme; 54.41082°N 2.19730°W		Early 18th century	A farmhouse and byre under one roof, in stone, with quoins, through-stones, and a stone slate roof. There are two storeys and three bays. It contains doorways with stone surrounds, fire and square windows.	II
Ravenseat Farmhouse; 54.42557°N 2.21325°W		Early 18th century	The farmhouse is in stone, with quoins, and an M-shaped stone slate roof with shaped kneelers and stone copings. There are two storeys, a double depth plan, and three bays. In the centre is a gabled quoined porch and a doorway with a quoined surround. Most of the windows are sashes, and at the rear is a round-headed stair window.	II
Greens South Farmhouse, byres, stable and cart shed 54.39543°N 2.17333°W		1731	The buildings are in stone and have stone slate roof with a shaped kneeler and stone coping to the left, and two storeys. The house has two bays and a double depth plan. The doorway has a stone surround with impost jambs on plinths. There is a fire window with a chamfered surround, and the other windows on the front are sashes. At the rear are two initialled datestones, and a round-headed stair window. The byre to the right has a doorway with interrupted jambs and a slab canopy, and a pitching door. Projecting to the right is a lower stable. To the left is a byre with a hayloft, and projecting further to the left is a single-storey cart shed with a mullioned window.	II
Tan Hill Inn; 54.45556°N 2.16036°W		Early to mid-18th century	The public house is in stone, with quoins, and an imitation stone flagged roof with shaped kneelers. There are two storeys and five bays. On the front is a gabled porch with a sandstone flagged roof and a doorway in the right return, and the windows are casements.	II
Barn north of Ravenseat Farmhouse; 54.42578°N 2.21363°W	—	18th century	The barn is in stone with quoins and a stone slate roof. It contains four board doors, some with impost jambs. Stone steps lead up to a hayloft door. In the right return are a doorway with a quoined surround, and through-stones.	II
Bridge between Ravenseat Farmhouse and Ravenseat Cottage; 54.42561°N 2.21294°W	—	18th century	An accommodation bridge between farm buildings over Hoods Bottom Beck. It is in stone and consists of a single segmental arch with stone voussoirs.	II
Limekiln east of junction with B6270; 54.37476°N 2.07941°W		Mid-18th century	The limestone is in dry stone and has a paraboloid plan. Large slabs form a lintel to the hearth, there is a cavity on the left side of the hearth entrance, and a large circular hole in the top.	II
Moor Close; 54.37909°N 2.18734°W		Mid-18th century	A farmhouse and byre under one roof, in stone, with a stone slate roof, shaped kneelers and stone copings, and two storeys, The house has a plinth, quoins, and two bays. The doorway has impost jambs, there is a fire window, and the other windows are sashes. The byre to the left has a doorway with impost jambs, and a vent, and external steps lead up to a hayloft. Further to the left is a projecting stable.	II
Packhorse bridge 54.42493°N 2.21333°W		18th century	The former packhorse bridge crosses Whitsundale Beck. It is in stone, and consists of a single segmental arch of voussoirs. The parapet has segmental coping.	II
Park Lodge; 54.40630°N 2.16651°W		1760	A farmhouse and a farm building under one roof, with quoins, and a stone slate roof with shaped kneelers and stone copings, and two storeys. The farmhouse has three bays, it contains a doorway with a surround on plinths, and above it is an inscribed date and initials. The windows are sashes, those on the ground floor with hood moulds. The farm building to the left has one bay, and contains sash windows.	II
Ivelet Farmhouse; 54.37745°N 2.09937°W	—	1761	The farmhouse is in stone with stone gutter brackets and a stone slate roof. There are two storeys, three bays and a partial rear outshut. The doorway has moulded imposts, and a basket-arched lintel, above which is an initialled and dated plaque. The windows are sashes.	II
West Calverts House; 54.37751°N 2.11727°W	—	1769	The farmhouse is in stone, with a stone slate roof, stone copings and shaped initialled and dated kneelers. There are two storeys and three bays. The doorway has a Tuscan doorcase with a cornice, and the windows on the front are sashes. At the rear is a round-arched stair window with imposts and a keystone.	II
East Calverts House; 54.37727°N 2.11683°W	—	Mid to late 18th century	A cottage in stone, with quoins, and a stone slate roof with shaped kneelers and stone coping. There are two storeys, two bays and a rear outshut. On the front is a doorway and sash windows, and at the rear is a mullioned window, and a tall flat-headed stair window with moulded arrises.	II
Limekiln beside track up to Smithy Holme; 54.40988°N 2.19016°W		Late 18th century	The limekiln is in dry stone and has a square plan. The hearth has a semicircular arch of voussoirs, and the circular hole on the top has partly collapsed.	II
Limekiln near Blackburn Beck; 54.40908°N 2.18219°W		Late 18th century	The limekiln is in dry stone and has a square plan. The hearth has a semicircular arch of voussoirs, and a tree is growing out of the hole on the top.	II
Long Close Bridge; 54.37693°N 2.15472°W		Late 18th century	The bridge carries the B6270 road over Straw Back. It is in stone and consists of a single segmental arch of voussoirs. There is a hood mould on the downstream side, and the parapet has triangular coping.	II
Greens North Farmhouse, stable, byre and railings 54.39607°N 2.17328°W	—	Early 19th century	The buildings are under one roof, and are in stone with a stone slate roof and two storeys. The farmhouse has two bays, and contains a central doorway and sash windows. To the left is a stable containing a re-set doorway with a chamfered quoined surround and a triangular soffit to the lintel with a recessed inscribed and dated panel. On the right is a byre with a side entry, and a hayloft with two vents. In front is a low wall with wrought iron railings and interval posts with urn finials.	II
Hope House; 54.40298°N 2.16631°W		Early 19th century	An inn, later a private house, in stone on a plinth, with rusticated quoins, a sill band, and a stone slate roof with stone copings and shaped kneelers. There are two storeys and three bays. The central doorway has a four-centred arch, the windows are sashes, those on the ground floor with hood moulds, and all the openings have stone surrounds. At the rear is a round-arched stair window.	II
Limekiln east of Satron; 54.37526°N 2.08580°W	—	Early 19th century	The limekiln is in stone, and has a paraboloid plan. It has a horseshoe elliptical arch of voussoirs over the hearth, and a circular hole at the top.	II
Ravenseat Cottage; 54.42546°N 2.21228°W	—	Early 19th century	A stone house with quoins, and a stone slate roof with shaped kneelers. There are two storeys and two bays. On the front is a doorway with a stone surround on plinths, and the windows are sashess.	II
Barn west of Ravenseat Cottage; 54.42549°N 2.21266°W	—	Early 19th century	The barn is in stone with projecting through-stones and a stone slate roof. It contains quoins, and two board doors with lintels.	II
Byre south-west of barn next to Ravenseat Cottage; 54.42546°N 2.21276°W	—	Early 19th century	The byre is in stone, with quoins, projecting through-stones, and a stone slate roof. It contains two board doors with a continuous hood mould between them.	II
Scar House Bridge; 54.37708°N 2.16028°W		Early 19th century	The bridge carries the B6270 road over Straw Beck. It is in stone, and consists of a single segmental arch of large voussoirs with a triangular hood mould. The parapet has coping secured with iron cramps.	II
Boundary stone at Hollow Mill Cross; 54.43149°N 2.29174°W		Early to mid-19th century	The boundary stone on the west side of the B6270 road is about 750 millimetres (30 in) tall, and has a triangular top. The south face is inscribed "HAMLET of BIRKDALE COUNTY of YORK", and on the east face is a benchmark.	II
Boundary stone to Cumbria/North Yorks; 54.45951°N 2.17196°W	—	Mid-19th century	The boundary stone is rough-dressed, it is about 2.5 metres (8 ft 2 in) tall, and has a square plan. On the south face is carved "42".	II
Bridge east of Stone House; 54.40369°N 2.21851°W		Mid-19th century	An accommodation bridge over the River Swale, it is in stone, and consists of a single segmental arch of voussoirs surmounted by a slab hood mould. The long parapets end in piers.	II
Angram Farm; 54.39323°N 2.17447°W	—	1836	The house is in stone, with sandstone dressings, quoins, a pulvinated cornice, and a stone slate roof. There are two storeys and two bays. The central doorway has Ionic fluted jambs, torus moulded imposts, a frieze with lozenges, a fluted keystone, and an inscribed and dated panel. The windows are sashes.	II
Bridge east of Firs Farmhouse; 54.40579°N 2.21039°W		1840	An accommodation bridge over the River Swale, it is in stone, and consists of a single segmental arch of voussoirs surmounted by a slab hood mould. The parapets have slab copings and end in piers. The bridge is dated on the upstream side.	II
Former Chapel School; 54.40541°N 2.16633°W		1847	The former school is in stone, with quoins, and a stone slate roof with stone copings. There is a single storey and three bays. On the front is a projecting gabled porch with the entry in the right side. In the porch is a sash window, and the other windows are casements. On the left gable is a bellcote with heart-shaped openings, an inscription and the date.	II
Marker stone 54.43082°N 2.29099°W		1856	The marker stone to the southwest of the B6270 road is about 1 metre (3 ft 3 in) tall and has a rounded top. The north face is inscribed with "THE TOWNSHIP OF NATEBY. 1856".	II
Keld URC Church, former manse, and railings 54.40557°N 2.16635°W		1860	The chapel and attached former manse are in stone, with rusticated quoins, and a stone slate roof with stone copings. The chapel to the right has a single storey, and contains two round-arched sash windows. In the centre is a two-storey gabled porch with a round-arched gabled bellcote. The porch contains a round-arched doorway with a quoined surround, voussoirs and a moulded arris, above which is a sundial. Over this is a round-arched opening with a keystone, containing a window and an inscribed and dated panel. The manse has two storeys and two bays, and contains a round-arched doorway with a keystone and sash windows. In front, there is a low wall with saddleback coping and wrought iron railings. The gate piers to the manse have pointed caps, and those to the chapel have pyramidal caps.	II
Former Institute, Keld; 54.40535°N 2.16650°W		1861	The building is in stone, with rusticated quoins, and a hipped stone slate roof. There are two storeys, and fronts of two and five bays. The entry is on the left side, and steps lead up to a gabled porch and a round-arched doorway with a quoined surround. This in flanked by narrow round-arched windows with keystones. At the rear is a window with three stepped round-arched heads and keystones, and elsewhere there are sash windows.	II
Chapel and railings, Thwaite; 54.37925°N 2.16870°W	—	1863	The chapel, later converted into two dwellings, is in sandstone, and has a stone slate roof with kneelers and stone coping. There is one storey and fronts of one and three bays. The entrance front is gabled and has quoins and a sill band. In the outer parts are slightly projecting porches each with a round-arched Tuscan doorway, and a cornice with acroteria. Between them is a round arch of voussoirs containing two round-arched windows, and a blind circle and two trefoils in the tympanum, over which is an oculus with keystones. On the apex is a bellcote with a spiked orb. On the sides are round-arched window with impost bands. In front of the chapel is a low coped wall with cast iron railings.	II
Muker Literary Institute, wall and railings 54.37633°N 2.14008°W		1867	The literary institute is in stone, with quoins, a floor band, and a slate roof with coped gables and kneelers. On the west front are steps leading to a projecting porch containing a round-headed doorway with a moulded surround, chamfered jambs with bands, and a keystone. Above it is a flat hood with a decorative top, and a curved Dutch gable with kneelers and a ball finial. The south front has two storeys and three bays. To the left is a round-headed doorway with a fanlight, a moulded impost and a keystone. To the right are two round-headed sash windows with keystones, and on the upper floor are sash windows with shouldered heads. Attached to the southwest corner is a low wall with spearhead railings.	II
Telephone kiosk, Angram; 54.39344°N 2.17455°W		1935	The K6 type telephone kiosk was designed by Giles Gilbert Scott. Constructed in cast iron, it has a square plan and a dome, and there are three unperforated crowns in the top panels.	II
Telephone kiosk north of West View Cottage; 54.41428°N 2.17486°W	—	1935	The K6 type telephone kiosk was designed by Giles Gilbert Scott. Constructed in cast iron, it has a square plan and a dome, and there are three unperforated crowns in the top panels.	II
Telephone kiosk at junction with road to Keld; 54.40356°N 2.16683°W		1935	The K6 type telephone kiosk was designed by Giles Gilbert Scott. Constructed in cast iron, it has a square plan and a dome, and there are three unperforated crowns in the top panels.	II
Telephone kiosk opposite the Farmers Arms Public House; 54.37620°N 2.14110°W	—	1935	The K6 type telephone kiosk was designed by Giles Gilbert Scott. Constructed in cast iron, it has a square plan and a dome, and there are three unperforated crowns in the top panels.	II
