= Birkdale, North Yorkshire =

Dale in North Yorkshire, England

Coordinates: 54.416°N 2.250°W

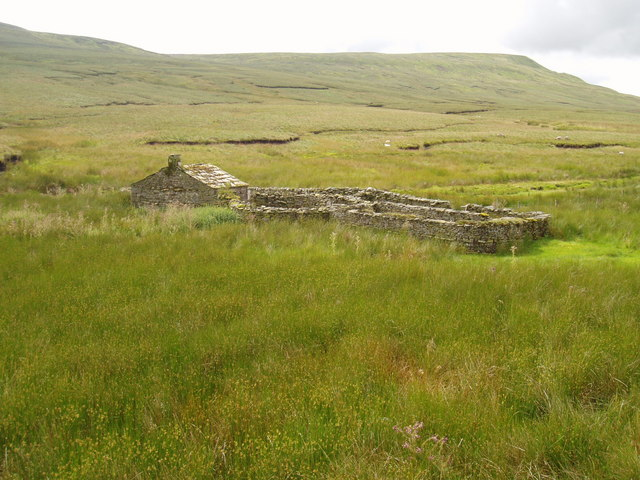
A sheepfold in Birkdale

Birkdale (sometimes written out as Birk Dale) is a dale in the Yorkshire Dales National Park, in North Yorkshire, England. It lies at the far western end of Swaledale, close to the border with Cumbria. The dale is one of the smallest of the Yorkshire Dales. The hamlet of Birkdale is in the lower part of the dale, 2 miles (3.2 km) west of Keld. The area forms part of the civil parish of Muker.

Birkdale Tarn is north of the hamlet of Birkdale across the B6270 road at a height of 1,594 feet (486 m) above sea level. The tarn covers and area of 17 acres (7 ha) and has an average depth of 15 feet (4.6 m). The tarn has been heavily modified, being a smaller upland lake that was converted into a larger body of water to ensure a constant supply of water for the lead industry in the area.

Birkdale Beck flows through the dale draining an upland area of 11.5 miles (18.5 km). At the eastern end of the dale the beck joins Great Sleddale Beck to become the River Swale. The dale suffered depopulation in the 1960s (like Grisedale, near to Garsdale), leaving only a few occupied farms and farmsteads.

The Coast to Coast long-distance path traverses Birkdale, leaving the B6270 at Birkdale Cross, and following an ancient track through Ravenseat to Tan Hill.

== See also ==
- Listed buildings in Muker
