= Oxnop Hall =

Building in North Yorkshire, England

Coordinates: 54°22′19″N 2°6′28″W

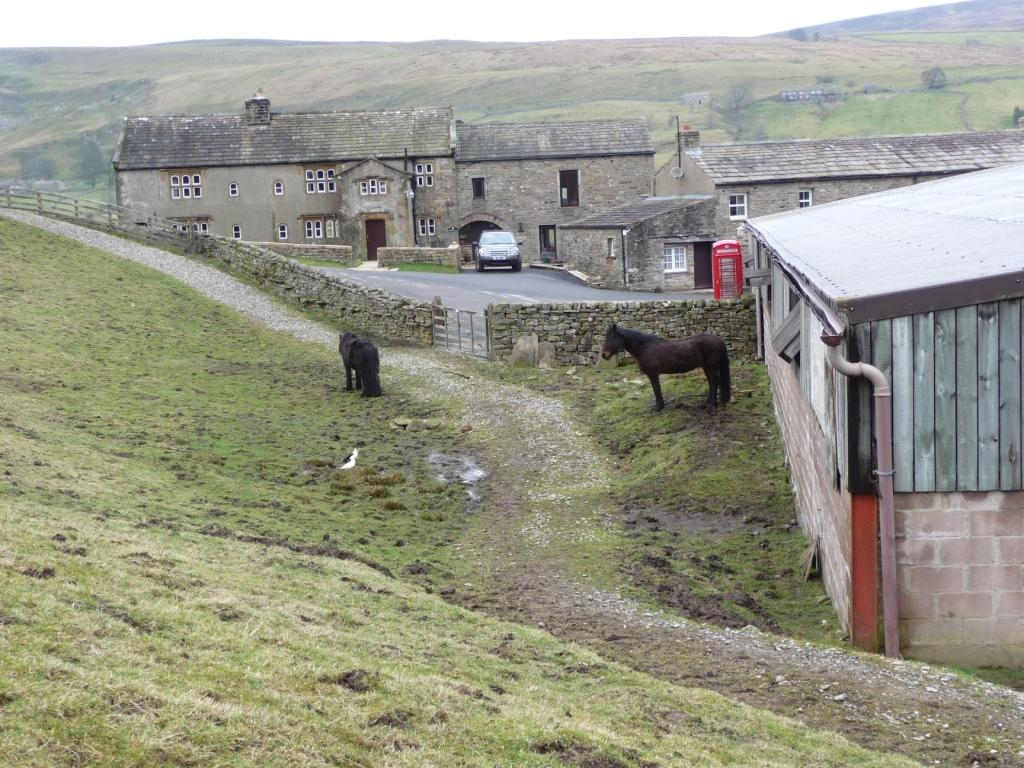
The building, in 2011

Oxnop Hall is a historic building near Muker in North Yorkshire, in England.

The date the farmhouse was built is uncertain, but it has a datestone reading 1685, so was either built or altered at that time. It was the home of George Kearton, a boxer and huntsman, who died in 1764, when he claimed to be 125 years old. The building was grade II* listed in 1966; Historic England describes it as "the best house of its type in Swaledale". In 2018, it remained in use as a farmhouse, and has more recently also served as a bed and breakfast.

The house is built of stone on a boulder plinth, with sandstone dressings, quoins and a stone slate roof with stone copings and shaped kneelers. It has two storeys, five bays, and a rear stair turret. On the front is a two-storey gabled porch containing a basket-arched doorway with a moulded chamfered surround, a dated and initialled lintel, and a hood mould, above which is an inscribed and dated panel. On the front are fire windows and a single-light window, and the other windows are mullioned or mullioned and transomed with hood moulds.

== See also ==
- Grade II* listed buildings in North Yorkshire (district)
- Listed buildings in Muker
