= Keld Old School Museum =

Museum in Keld, North Yorkshire, England

Coordinates: 54°24′19″N 2°09′59″W

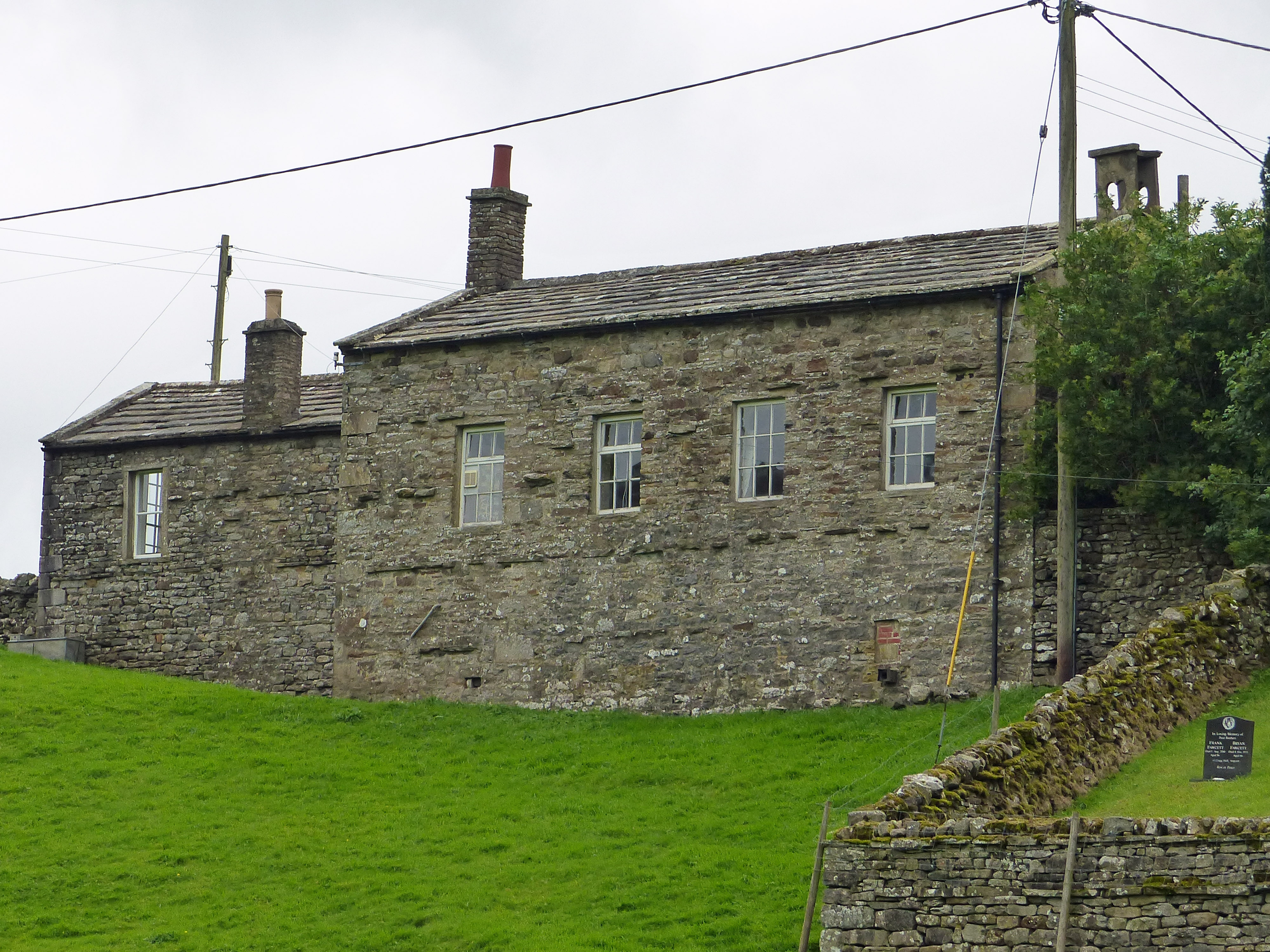
The building, in 2020

The Keld Old School Museum is a museum in a historic building in Keld, North Yorkshire, a village in England.

The school was built in 1847, on the initiative of James Wilkinson, minister at the Keld Congregational Church. It closed in the 1970s, and was used as a bunkhouse, then as a storeroom. The building was grade II listed in 1986. In 2022, it was restored by the Keld Resource Centre, and opened as a museum of life in Upper Swaledale.

The building is constructed of stone, with quoins, and a stone slate roof with stone copings. There is a single storey and three bays. On the front is a projecting gabled porch with the entry in the right side. In the porch is a sash window, and the other windows are casements. On the left gable is a bellcote with heart-shaped openings, an inscription and the date 1847.

== See also ==
- Listed buildings in Muker
