= Angram, Muker =

Hamlet in North Yorkshire, England

Coordinates: 54.393°N 2.175°W

Angram
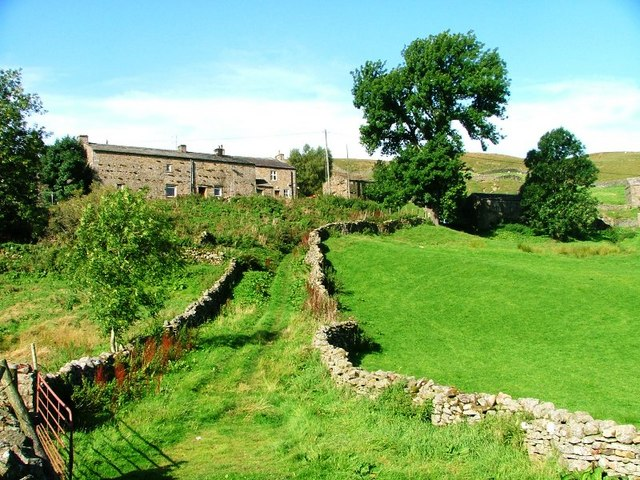
- Green Lane

- Location within North Yorkshire
- OS grid reference: SD888997
- Civil parish: Muker
- Unitary authority: North Yorkshire
- Ceremonial county: North Yorkshire
- Region: Yorkshire and the Humber
- Country: England
- Sovereign state: United Kingdom
- Post town: RICHMOND
- Postcode district: DL11
- Dialling code: 01748
- Police: North Yorkshire
- Fire: North Yorkshire
- Ambulance: Yorkshire
- UK Parliament: Richmond and Northallerton

Angram is a hamlet in the Yorkshire Dales in the county of North Yorkshire, England. It is near Keld to the north and Thwaite to the south. Angram forms part of the civil parish of Muker.

== Governance ==
The hamlet is within the Richmond and Northallerton parliamentary constituency, which is under the control of the Conservative Party. The Member of Parliament since the 2015 general election has been Rishi Sunak.

From 1974 to 2023 it was part of the district of Richmondshire. It is now administered by the unitary North Yorkshire Council.

== Geography ==
The hamlet is on the B6270 between Thwaite and Keld below Great Shunner Fell and close to a small beck named Skeb Skeugh. The area around this beck, known as Angram Bottoms, has been designated a Site of Special Scientific Interest (SSSI). It is made up of seven fields covering 24.2 acres supporting a diverse habitat of flora. A combination of mire and wet grassland, due to many sinkholes and springs. Plants in the wet grasslands that can be found here include sharp-flowered rush, lesser spearwort, slender tufted-sedge, bottle sedge, common marsh-bedstraw, northern marsh-orchid, marsh-marigold and meadowsweet. Other areas of marsh support marsh lousewort, carnation sedge, flea sedge, star sedge, marsh valerian and marsh violet.

== See also ==
- Listed buildings in Muker
