= Scot's Dike =

Scot's Dike or Scot's Dyke may refer to:

- Scot's Dyke, a linear earthwork in Richmondshire, North Yorkshire
- Scots' Dike, a linear earthwork constructed in 1552 between England and Scotland
