= Keld Literary Institute =

Building in Keld, North Yorkshire, England

Coordinates: 54°24′19″N 2°09′59″W

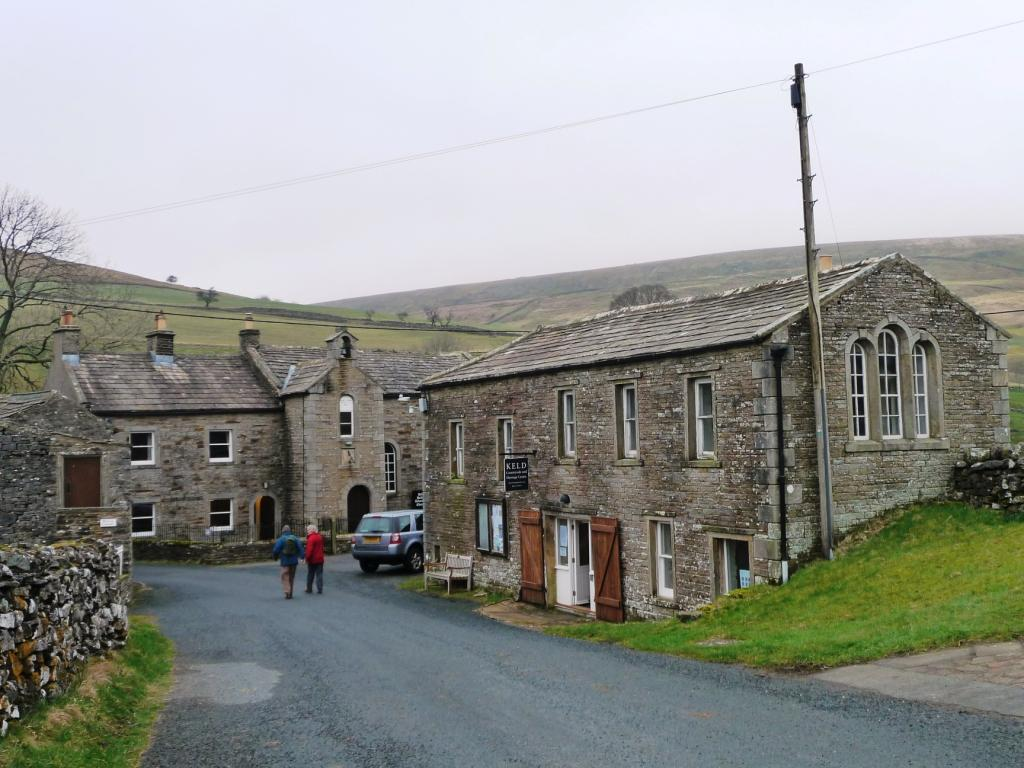
The building, in 2021

The Keld Literary Institute is a historic building in Keld, North Yorkshire, a village in England.

== History ==
James Wilkinson became the minister at Keld Congregational Church in 1838. In 1854, he founded a Mutual Improvement Society, and in 1861 arranged for the construction of a building for its meetings. The chapel had just been rebuilt, and Wilkinson saved money by reusing the old chapel roof on the new building. It became the Literary Institute, with a library and reading table, and opened in 1862. The building was grade II listed in 1986. In 2011, the Keld Resource Centre converted the ground floor stable and carriage room into the Countryside and Heritage Centre, a local museum. The upper floor, which was derelict for some years, was in 2017 converted into an events and conference space.

== Architecture ==
The building is constructed of stone, with rusticated quoins, and a hipped stone slate roof. There are two storeys, and fronts of two and five bays. The entry is on the left side, and steps lead up to a gabled porch and a round-arched doorway with a quoined surround. This in flanked by narrow round-arched windows with keystones. At the rear is a window with three stepped round-arched heads and keystones, and elsewhere there are sash windows.

== See also ==
- Listed buildings in Muker
