= Church of St Mary the Virgin, Muker =

Anglican church in North Yorkshire, England

Church of St Mary, Muker
- Church of St Mary the Virgin, Muker
- St Mary Muker
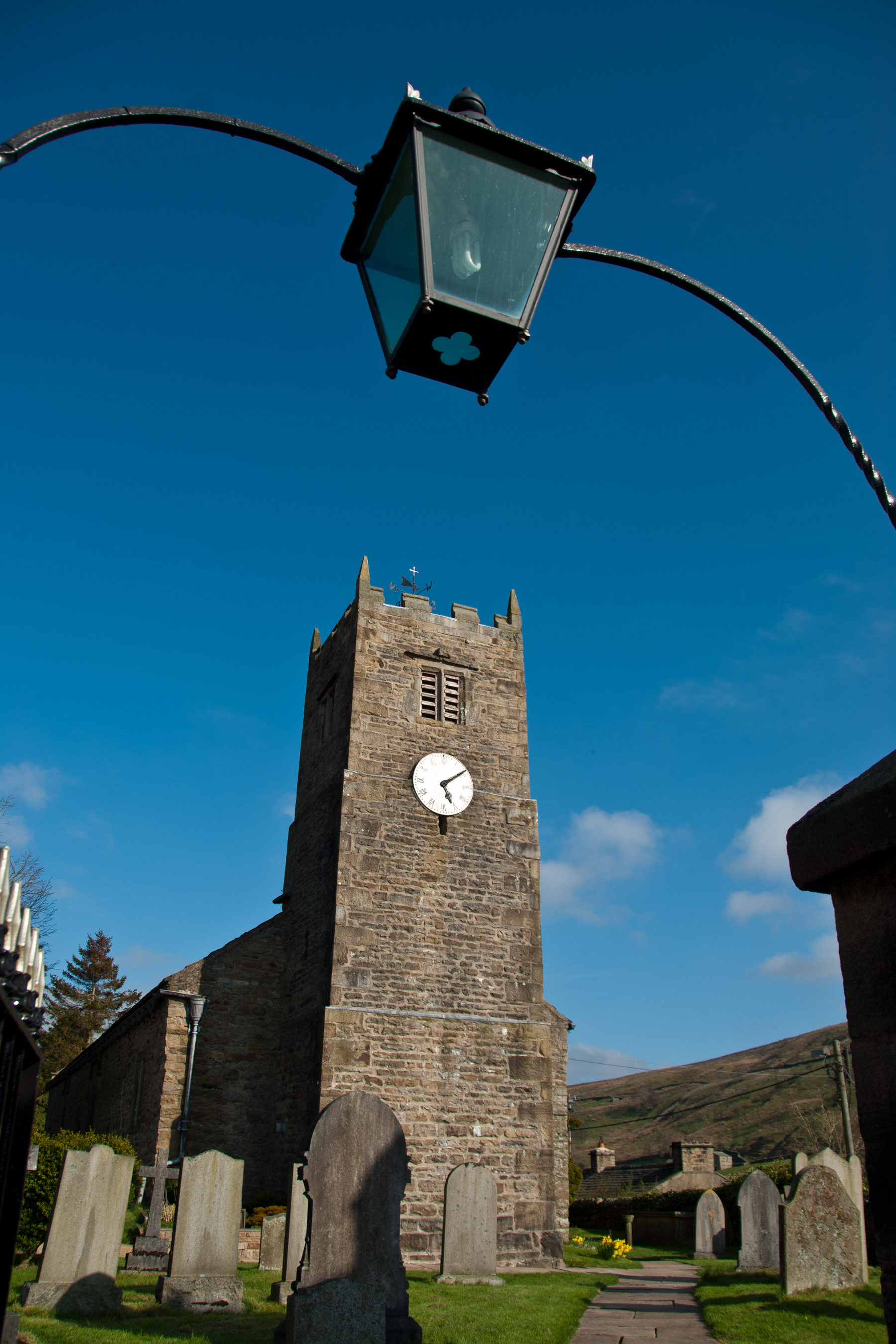
- Church of St Mary, Muker

- Location within North Yorkshire
- 54.3763°N 2.1391°W
- OS grid reference: SD 91055 97880
- Location: Muker, North Yorkshire
- Country: England
- Denomination: Church of England
- Website: Official website

History
- Founded: 1580

Architecture
- Functional status: Active

Administration
- Diocese: Leeds
- Archdeaconry: Richmond and Craven
- Deanery: Richmond
- Benefice: Swaledale with Arkengarthdale
- Parish: Swaledale with Arkengarthdale

Listed Building – Grade II*
- Designated: 7 December 1966
- Reference no.: 1302046

The Church of St Mary the Virgin is an Anglican church in the Upper Swaledale village of Muker, in North Yorkshire, England. It is one of four churches in the ecclesiastical Parish of Swaledale with Arkengarthdale. The church was constructed in 1580, but previous to this, a chapel-of-ease had stood on the site which came under the Church of St Andrew in Grinton. Until the consecration of St Mary's, baptisms, weddings and funerals, had to be conducted at the church in Grinton. The Church of St Mary the Virgin, is noted for being a rare example of a house of worship being built during the Elizabethan era.

== Ecclesiastical background ==
The parish registers for Grinton record that in August 1580, the Bishop of Chester, William Chaderton, (Note: Listed in the Grinton Parish Registers as William Chatterton.) visited to

...allow the inhabitants there to baptize, marry and to bury and to minister the sacraments of the church according to the prescribed order set downe in the Booke of Common prayer. Provided that the said inhabitants pay all their ecclesiasticall dutyes to the vicar of Grinton... [sic]"

Until the consecration of the graveyard, deaths occurring in Muker, Keld and Upper Swaledale, involved carrying the deceased along the Corpse Road to Grinton for burial, some 10 miles (16 km) to 14 miles (23 km) to the east. This process could take three days to accomplish and involved many stops.

The church at Muker was thus allowed to carry out its own affairs, whilst still being tied to St Andrew's at Grinton. St Mary's stayed as a daughter church to the parish church in Grinton for 300 years when it was finally granted its own parish in 1892. The church was the focus of much religious activities in the area after the chapel at Keld was destroyed. Some records point to the destruction being part of a riot linked to the Dissolution.

Speight, writing in "Romantic Richmondshire", describes the village as: "The grey, old village of Muker, with its plain little church, stands under the precipitous scars of Kisdon..."

== History ==
The church was built in 1580, which makes it rare as an example of an Elizabethan church; not many places of worship were built at this time. Originally, the roof was thatched, being replaced with slate in 1791. It is thought that the tower was shorter when first built, than it is now, being adapted in 1719. Glynne describes the tower as being "wholly devoid of character", the windows as being Perpendicular, and the whole structure as "mean and ugly". The tower measures almost 7 feet 9 inches (2.36 m) by 7 feet 3 inches (2.21 m), with the nave and chancel measuring 68 feet (21 m) in length, and 22 feet (6.7 m) wide.

In the 1890s, some frescoes were revealed underneath the paintwork/whitewash, however, these were deemed worthless and so not kept. Earlier stonework, possibly from the 14th century, is included in the walls of the church, and the original bells in the tower were thought to have been brought up the valley from Ellerton Priory, after the Dissolution. The bells were undated, but their narrow shape indicated a "Medieval date". The church has a variety of stained glass, one of which (the east window) depicts the surrounding countryside, the River Swale and Straw Beck. The church was renovated in 1890, when the west gallery was removed, something which not only made the church smaller, but was also unpopular with local parishioners. The entrance to the church is a via the south door, over which a sundial is affixed.

Besides the church, a grade II listed font is extant, though located in the churchyard, 9.8 feet (3 m) south of the porch door. It is possibly the original 1580 font.

== Parish and diocese ==
The church is located in the parish and benefice of Swaledale with Arkengarthdale, a community of four churches, the other three being St Andrew's Grinton, St Mary's, Arkengarthdale, and Holy Trinity at Low Row. Historically, the church was in the Diocese of Chester, but is now in the Diocese of Leeds.

== See also ==
- Grade II* listed churches in North Yorkshire (district)
- Listed buildings in Muker
