= Tan Hill, North Yorkshire =

High point in North Yorkshire, England

Tan Hill
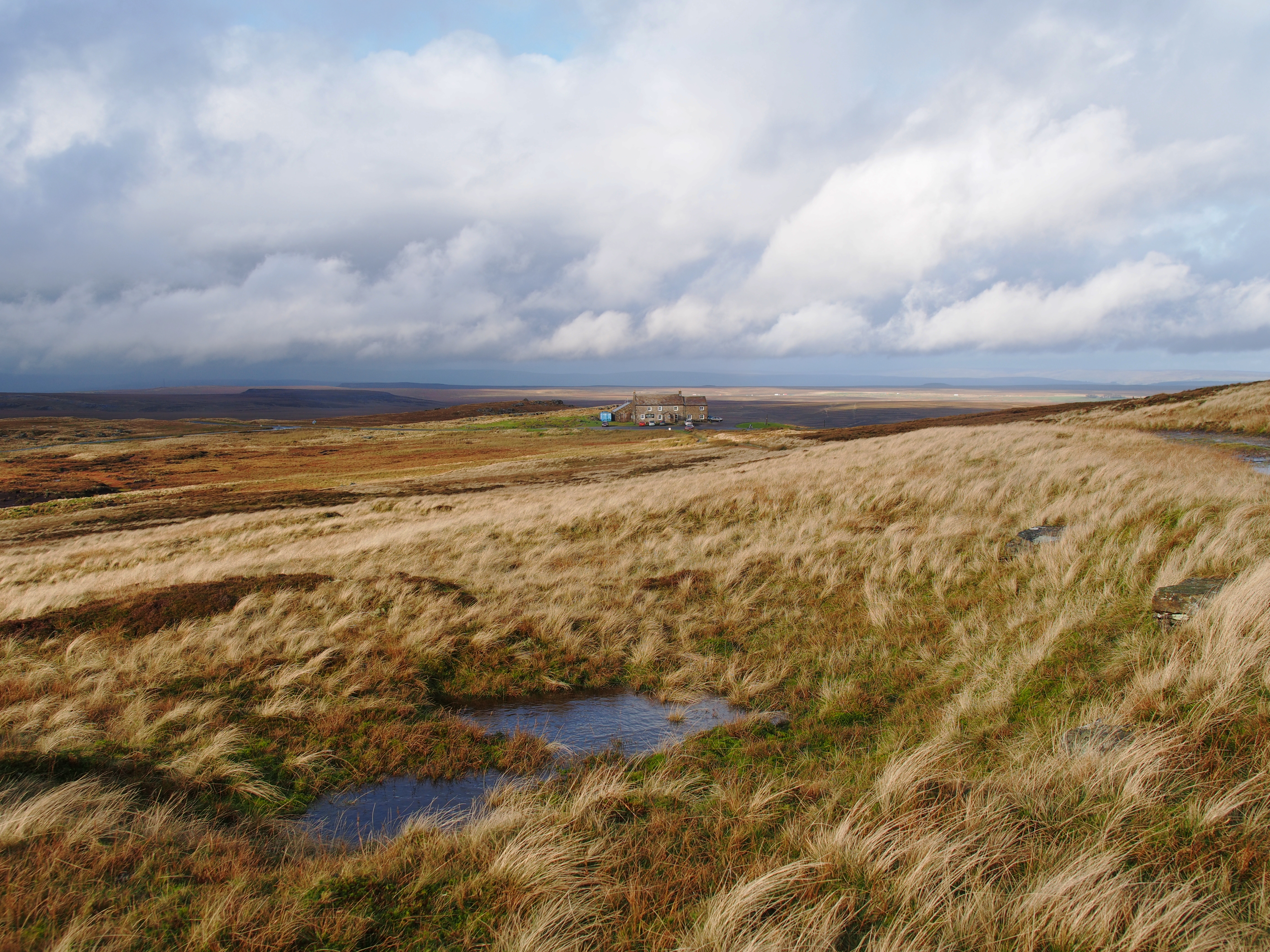
- Tan Hill Inn and surrounding countryside

Highest point
- Coordinates: 54.4555°N 2.1600°W

Geography
- Location within North Yorkshire
- Location: North Yorkshire, England
- OS grid: NY896067

Tan Hill (NY896067) is a high point on the Pennine Way in North Yorkshire, England. It lies north of Keld in the civil parish of Muker, near the borders of County Durham and Westmorland, and close to the northern boundary of the Yorkshire Dales National Park. It fell within the historic boundaries of the North Riding of Yorkshire. It is in an isolated location, the nearest town of Kirkby Stephen is 11 miles (18 km) by road.

The Tan Hill Inn is the highest inn in the British Isles at 1,732 feet (528 m) above sea level.

== Coal mining ==
The Upper Howgate Edge Grit is a coarse-grained sandstone within the Pendleian, the lower subsystem of the Carboniferous structure. Found in the peaks of the highest fells of North Yorkshire, the shale layer containing coal lies above it. The shale under the northwest region is called the Tan Hill seam, and was worked from the 13th century until the early 1930s.

The first records of coal being produced are from 1384, when locally worked shallow shafts produced coal for Richmond Castle. The poor-quality coal produced a dirty, dusty fuel but when mixed with peat it gave a good glow, and could smoulder overnight until revived in the morning. Before the start of the Industrial Revolution, the easily accessible upper seams were mainly worked out, requiring investment in deeper shafts. By the 17th century the poor-quality coal was locally converted in simple beehive kilns into coke – known locally as "cinders" – which was used in lead and iron smelting.

With modern means of transport having encroached on the valley, the local miners defied the 1926 General Strike. When better coal became more easily available, the local coal became less desirable and the last mine closed in 1929. Locals worked the residual upper seams by hand until the mid-1930s.
