= Thwaite, North Yorkshire =

Village in North Yorkshire, England

Coordinates: 54.379°N 2.168°W

Thwaite
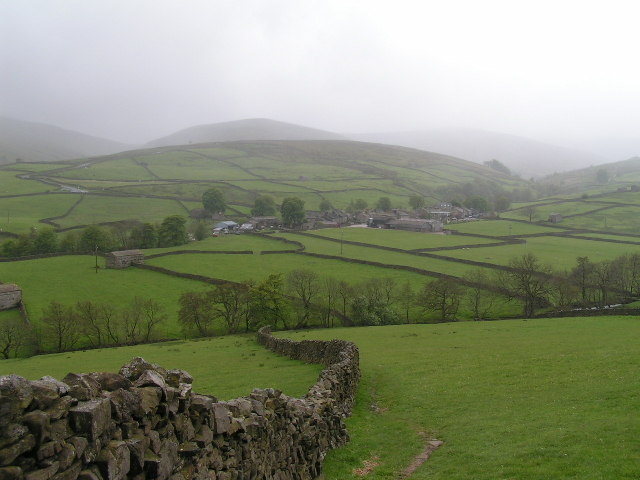
- Thwaite and Swaledale

- Location within North Yorkshire
- OS grid reference: SD8998
- Civil parish: Muker
- Unitary authority: North Yorkshire
- Ceremonial county: North Yorkshire
- Region: Yorkshire and the Humber
- Country: England
- Sovereign state: United Kingdom
- Post town: RICHMOND
- Postcode district: DL11
- Dialling code: 01748
- Police: North Yorkshire
- Fire: North Yorkshire
- Ambulance: Yorkshire
- UK Parliament: Richmond and Northallerton

Thwaite is a small village in the Yorkshire Dales, North Yorkshire, England. It is in Swaledale and is part of the civil parish of Muker. The village lies on the B6270 road that runs through Swaledale from east to west and is 9.3 miles (15 km) west of Reeth. The name "Thwaite" comes from the Old Norse word þveit, meaning 'clearing, meadow or paddock'.

Thwaite has two long-distance walking paths running through it: the Coast to Coast and the Pennine Way. There are two parts to the Coast to Coast walk: one part passes north of Thwaite and across the hills to Reeth, and the other goes through the village and across the valley floor. The Herriot Way also runs through the village, which as it passes through Thwaite, is on the same course as the Pennine Way.

From 1974 to 2023, Thwaite was part of the district of Richmondshire. It is now administered by the unitary North Yorkshire Council.

== History ==
Thwaite was involved in the lead mining economy of the late nineteenth century but to a lesser extent than other dales communities.

The village was the home and birthplace of Richard and Cherry Kearton, who were pioneers in wildlife photography at the end of the 19th century. The Kearton name lives on in the Kearton tea rooms and guesthouse in the centre of the village and the Kearton Country Hotel.

Local legend has it that the bridge over Thwaite Beck, was washed away during a fierce thunderstorm in the late 19th century. No-one was injured but a pig, that was taken by the waters, managed to climb out of the beck further downstream. A flash flood did hit the village in 1899, which resulted in the destruction of some outbuildings and gardens. Due to the de-population of Thwaite at that time (because of the decline in the mining industry) many of the structures were not repaired.

On the 28 January 1943, a Handley Page Halifax of No. 1659 Heavy Conversion Unit RAF (HCU) crashed on the eastern side of Great Shunner Fell. All crew were rescued from the aircraft by Sergeant C L Pudney, although 3 later died of their wounds. After rescuing his crew, Sgt Pudney trekked the 2 miles (3.2 km) into Thwaite to raise the alarm. Whilst Sgt Pudney was awarded the George Medal for his heroic actions, he was unable to receive the award as he was killed when the No. 405 RCAF Squadron Halifax he was flying in was struck by lightning and crashed at King's Lynn on the 13 June 1943.

== In popular culture ==
Thwaite has been cited as the setting of Misselthwaite Manor in the book The Secret Garden by Frances Hodgson Burnett. However, in the book Space and Place in Children's Literature, it states that the Thwaite in the book bears no relation to Thwaite in North Yorkshire.

Thwaite is a Viking city in the 1996 game Civilization II.

== See also ==
- Listed buildings in Muker
