= Angram Bottoms =

Grasslands in the Yorkshire Dales, England

Coordinates: 54.39446°N 2.16938°W

- Site of Special Scientific Interest
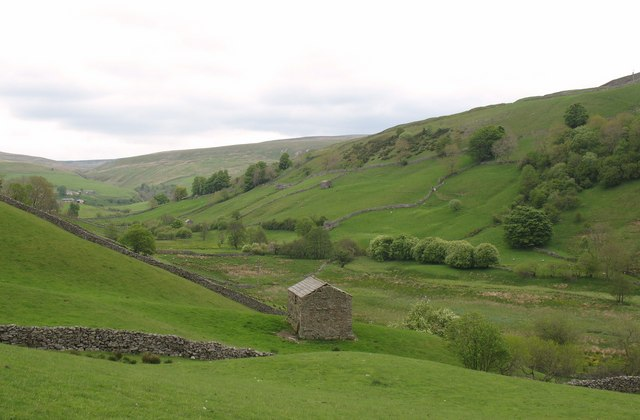
- Location of Angram Bottoms.
- Area of search: North Yorkshire
- Grid reference: SD891999
- Interest: Biological
- Area: 9.8 ha (24 acres)
- Notification date: 1989

Angram Bottoms (grid reference SD891999) is a 9.8 hectares (24 acres) biological Site of Special Scientific Interest (SSSI) near to the village of Angram in the Yorkshire Dales, England. The SSSI was first notified in 1989 and is due to the wet and dry grassland habitats which are unusual in the Yorkshire Dales.
