= Satron =

Hamlet in North Yorkshire, England

Coordinates: 54.375280°N 2.093560°W

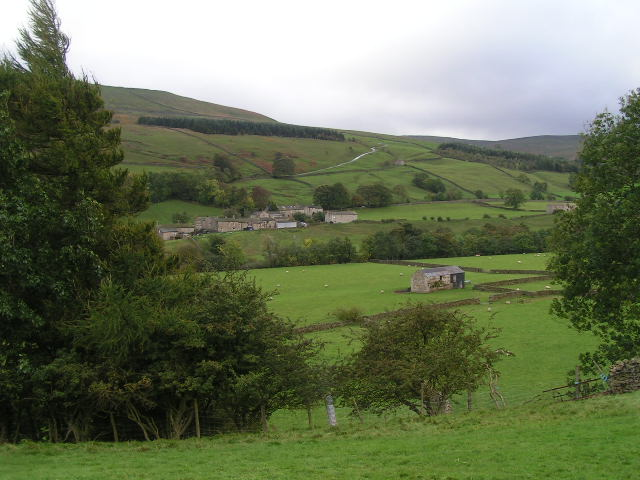
- Looking from Gunnerside across the River Swale to Satron

- Location within North Yorkshire
- OS grid reference: SD940977
- Civil parish: Muker
- Unitary authority: North Yorkshire
- Ceremonial county: North Yorkshire
- Region: Yorkshire and the Humber
- Country: England
- Sovereign state: United Kingdom
- Post town: RICHMOND
- Postcode district: DL11
- Dialling code: 01748
- Police: North Yorkshire
- Fire: North Yorkshire
- Ambulance: Yorkshire
- UK Parliament: Richmond and Northallerton

Satron is a hamlet in Swaledale, North Yorkshire, England. It lies 0.6 miles (1 km) south west of Gunnerside on the opposite bank of the River Swale. It is in the civil parish of Muker, but used to be in the ancient parish of Grinton. From 1974 to 2023 it was part of the district of Richmondshire, it is now administered by the unitary North Yorkshire Council.

The hamlet is on the south Bank of the River Swale and nestles on the northern edge of the B6270, the Kirkby Stephen to Downholme road through Swaledale.

The name of the village derives from Old Norse 'saetr' (summer pasture) from when Upper Swaledale was settled by the Norse peoples to graze cattle and sheep.

South of the hamlet is Satron Moor, which used to be worked for minerals as with much of the Upper Swaledale area. The waters were collected on the moor and used to 'hush' the minerals out. The water was then allowed to flow into Oxnop Beck. Mining ceased about 1870. Satron Moor is designated as a SSSI.
