= Scot's Dyke =

Earthwork in North Yorkshire, England

Coordinates: 54.448°N 1.703°W

Scot's Dyke, also known as the Scots Dyke or the Scots Dike, is a linear earthwork in the district of Richmondshire in the county of North Yorkshire, England. It is about fourteen kilometres (8.7 miles) long and runs from the river Swale to the river Tees.

Camden in Britannia says:

“and neere at hand there is seene a ditch by Stanwig a little village, that runneth eight miles in length betweene the river Tees and Swale.”

The Scot's Dyke varies in size and form throughout its length, which show that each section was built by a separate group of workers. South of the A66 road the dyke had a bank up to 1.5 metres (4 ft 11 in) high and 10m wide with a ditch 7 metres (23 ft) wide and 1 metre (3 ft 3 in) deep. On the eastern side of the ditch traces could be seen of a counterscarp bank approximately 5m wide.

Parts of the dyke are possibly a double dyke (two banks with a ditch in the middle) as shown by the Ordnance Survey maps at the northern end of the dyke. A link with the earthworks of the oppidum at Stanwick near the northern end of the dyke would make sense but there is no evidence of this.

Excavations in advance of the A66 road improvements in 2006-2007 gave an opportunity for the dyke to be investigated. No artefacts were recovered from the excavation and the relationship between the Scot's Dyke and the Roman road was not established but samples of the ditch fills were taken for dating:

“Archaeomagnetic dating of sediment fills from Scots Dyke in 2006 provided results suggesting that the feature was starting to fill up in the period from the first century BC to the first century AD.”

The Scot's Dyke should not be confused with the Scots' Dike that marks part of the border between England and Scotland.
