= Muker =

Village and civil parish in North Yorkshire, England

Coordinates: 54.376°N 2.140°W

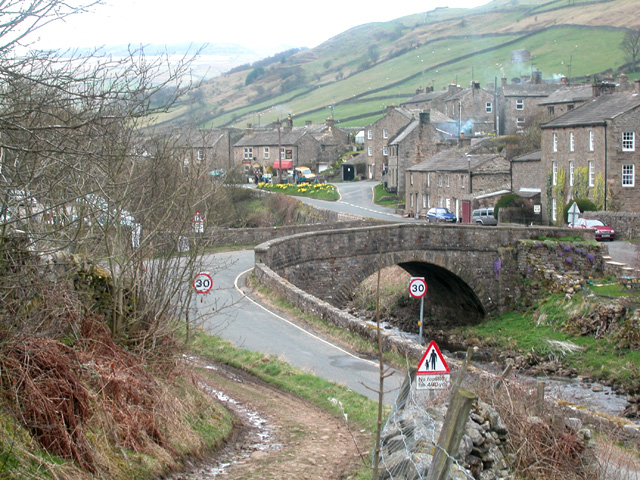
- Muker Village looking west. The beck in the foreground is the Straw Beck, a tributary of the River Swale which it joins a short distance away to the north-east.

- Location within North Yorkshire
- Population: 249 (2011 census)
- OS grid reference: NY8901
- Civil parish: Muker
- Unitary authority: North Yorkshire
- Ceremonial county: North Yorkshire
- Region: Yorkshire and the Humber
- Country: England
- Sovereign state: United Kingdom
- Post town: RICHMOND
- Postcode district: DL11
- Dialling code: 01748
- Police: North Yorkshire
- Fire: North Yorkshire
- Ambulance: Yorkshire
- UK Parliament: Richmond and Northallerton

Muker is a village and civil parish at the western end of Swaledale in North Yorkshire, England, within the Yorkshire Dales.

The parish includes the hamlets and villages of Angram, Keld, Satron, Thwaite, West Stonesdale and Birkdale, as well as the Tan Hill Inn, the highest in England. At the 2001 census the civil parish had a population of 309, reducing to 249 at the 2011 census. In 2015, North Yorkshire County Council estimated the population to be 260.

From 1974 to 2023 it was part of the district of Richmondshire. It is now administered by the unitary North Yorkshire Council.

== History ==
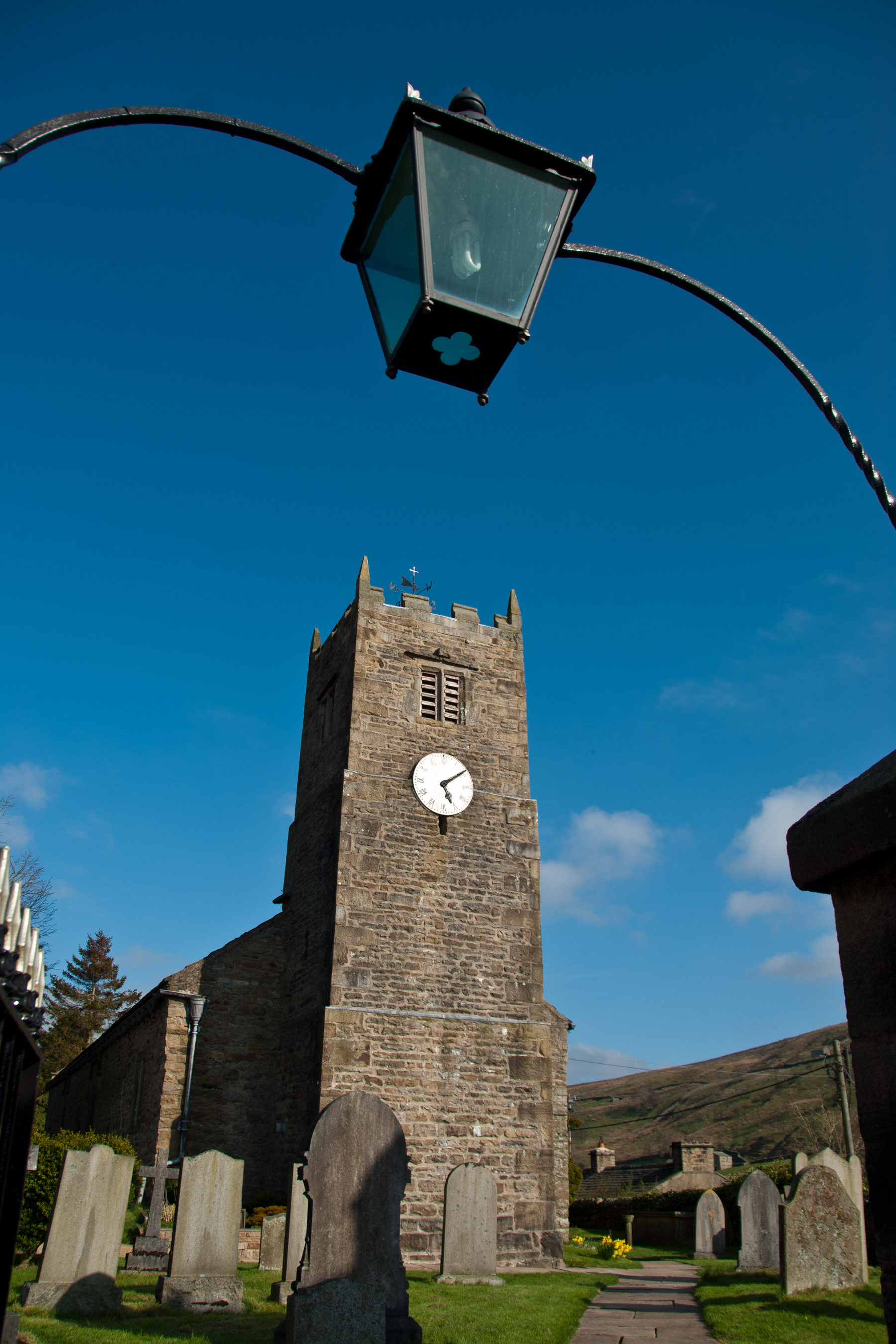
St Mary's Church dates from around 1580

The earliest recorded evidence of occupation in and around Muker takes the form of a skeleton found, with flints, on Muker Common in the early 20th century. Details suggest a burial of Bronze Age date.

The name of Muker is of Norse origin, derived from the Old Norse mjór akr meaning "the narrow newly cultivated field". The location at the meeting of the River Swale and the Straw Beck with plenty of good meadow land around is most likely why the Norse chose to settle here, giving them the opportunity to make a living out of mixed farming and pastoral farming.

Agriculture continued to be the basis of economy in Muker until lead mining became more important during the late 18th century and the early 19th century. Muker was also a major centre for hand knitting during this period. The importance of these industries is reflected in the many cottages, workshops and other buildings constructed at the time. After knitting machines were invented, hand knitting ended as a cottage industry, although it experienced a revival that started in the 1970s.

Muker was historically a township in the large ancient parish of Grinton in the North Riding of Yorkshire. The Church of St Mary the Virgin was built during the reign of Elizabeth I. A chapel of ease had stood on this site previously but in 1580 it was substantially rebuilt and a graveyard consecrated so that residents of Upper Swaledale no longer had to transport their dead all the way to the parish church in Grinton. The tower, nave and chancel all date from this period. The church was restored in 1891.

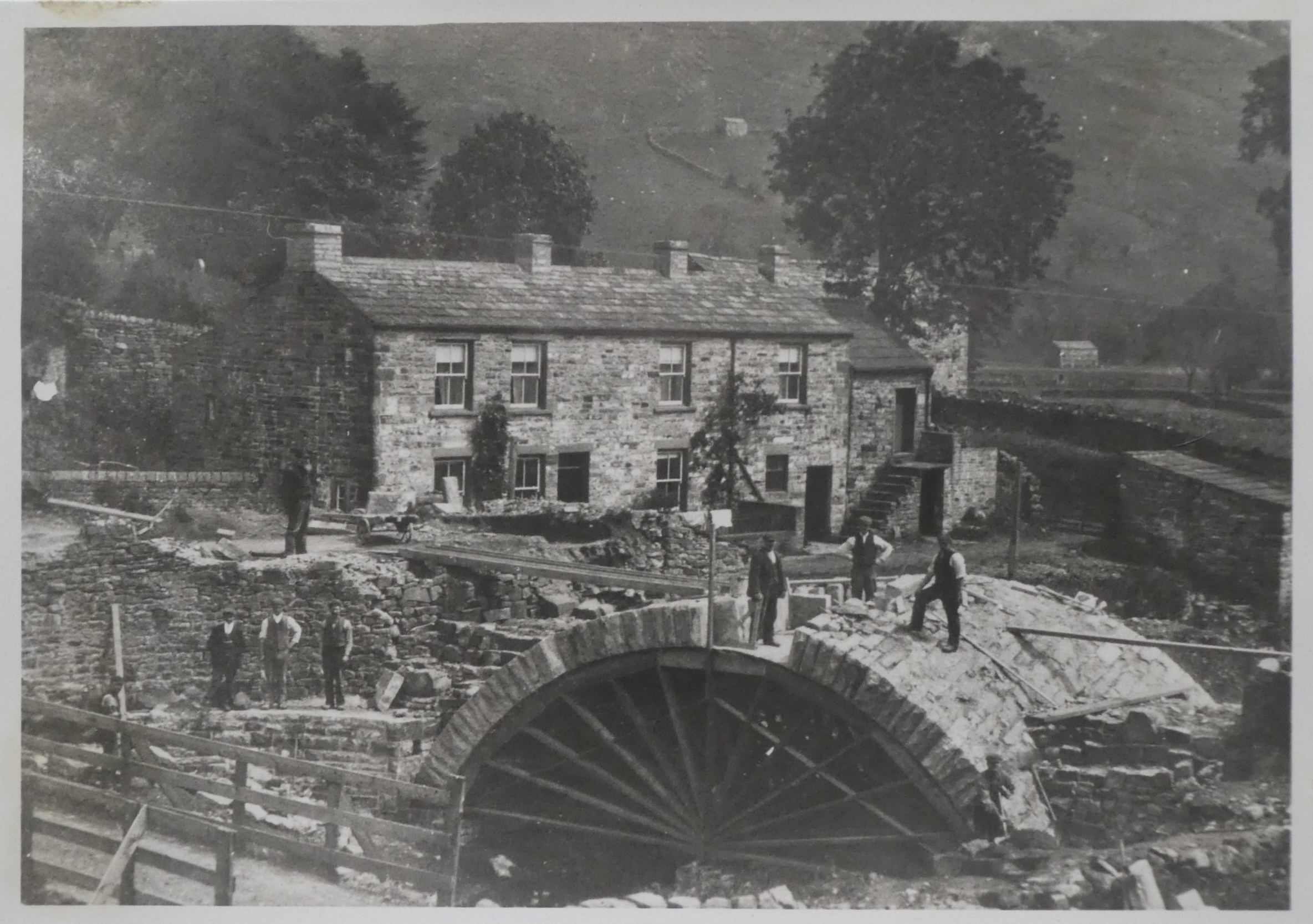
Muker Bridge under construction, 1906–07

In 1866 Muker became a separate civil parish.

With the decline of the mining industry, farming remained the principal occupation. From the late 19th century Muker began to see an increasing number of visitors and holiday makers and today the village is a popular starting point for walks in the area, with a great number of public footpaths in Upper Swaledale.

== Village today ==
The traditional late-18th- and early-19th-century barns and drystone walls of Swaledale are the most characteristic feature of the landscape. The flower-rich hay meadows around Muker are of international importance and are carefully protected. Farmers receive grants which allow them to farm the land by traditional methods, without using artificial fertilizers.

Muker is also home to the Muker Silver Band, a brass band formed in 1897. The band, which recently celebrated its hundredth anniversary, is now one of the last surviving bands in Swaledale and Wensleydale, and still maintains a busy calendar of public appearances.

Muker is at grid reference SD910978, on the banks of the Straw Beck near its confluence with the River Swale.

Although at one time a centre for lead mining, the main economic activities are now woollen clothing, tourism, grouse shooting and sheep farming. The pub, which is called the Farmers Arms, closed in the early 2020s, but was re-opened in September 2024 as a community-owned venture. Muker also has a village shop as well as an art gallery, craft shop and a café within the old school building. Originally the vicarage, the Muker village tea shop was built in 1680 and retains much of its 'olde worlde charm' today. A Park Information Point for the Yorkshire Dales National Park can be found at the Muker village shop. The village has one church; the Parish Church of Saint Mary, a Grade II* listed building. Originally dating from around 1580 and having been restored in the 19th century the church was listed on 7 December 1966. There is a small campsite on the western edge of the village.

Muker Show is held every year on the first Wednesday in September.

On 5 July 2014, the Tour de France Stage 1 from Leeds to Harrogate passed through the village.

== Popular culture ==
Muker is featured in the British television series All Creatures Great and Small, in the episode "Hampered", as the venue for the Darrowby Flower Show. The murder scene of the 1982 film Evil Under the Sun was shot in Muker.

== See also ==
- Listed buildings in Muker

== Gallery ==
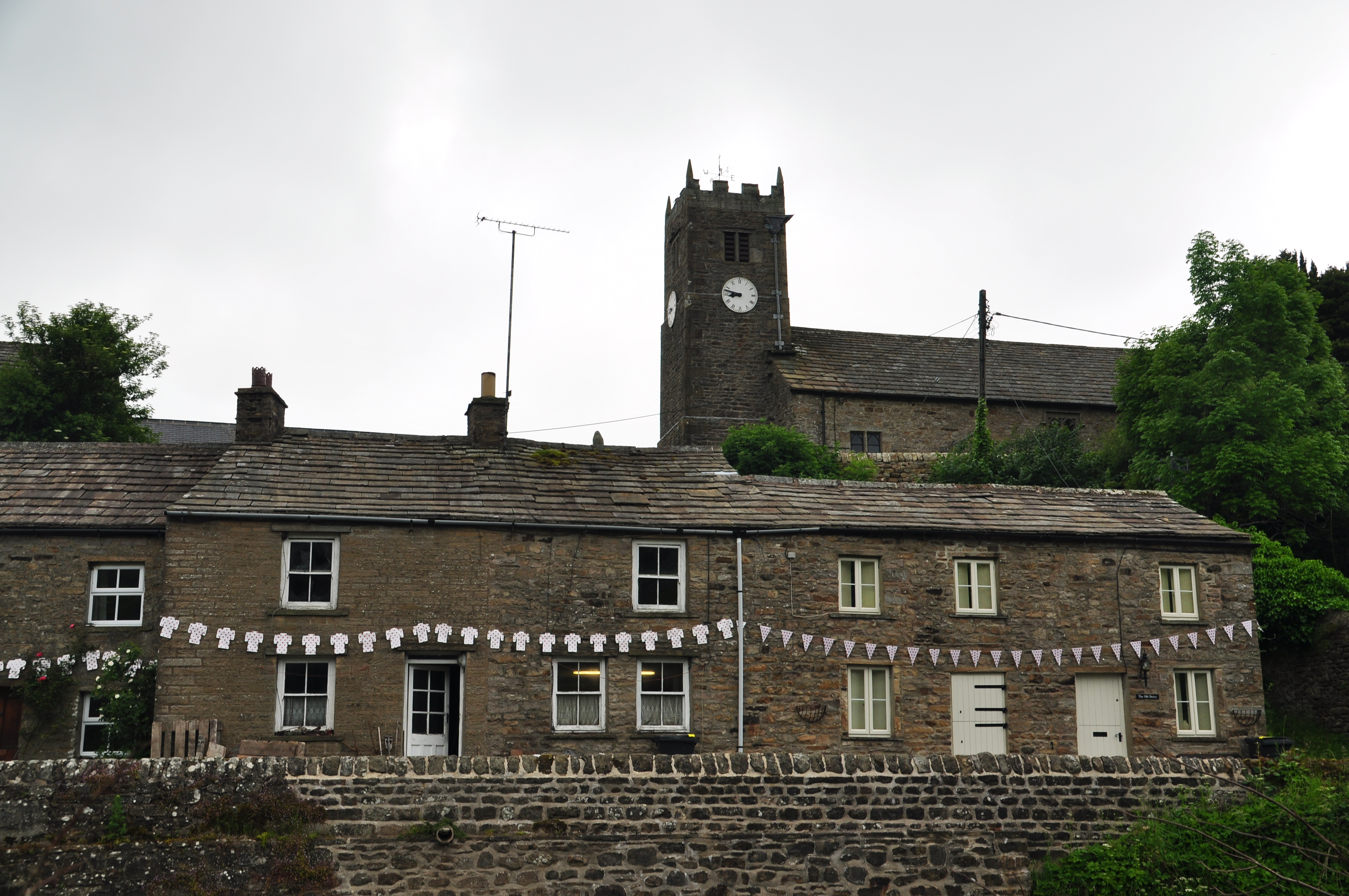
St Mary's Church, seen behind houses on Main Street, was consecrated in 1580, but some components had been moved from earlier structures; the decorations in this image were added for the Tour de France (June 2014)

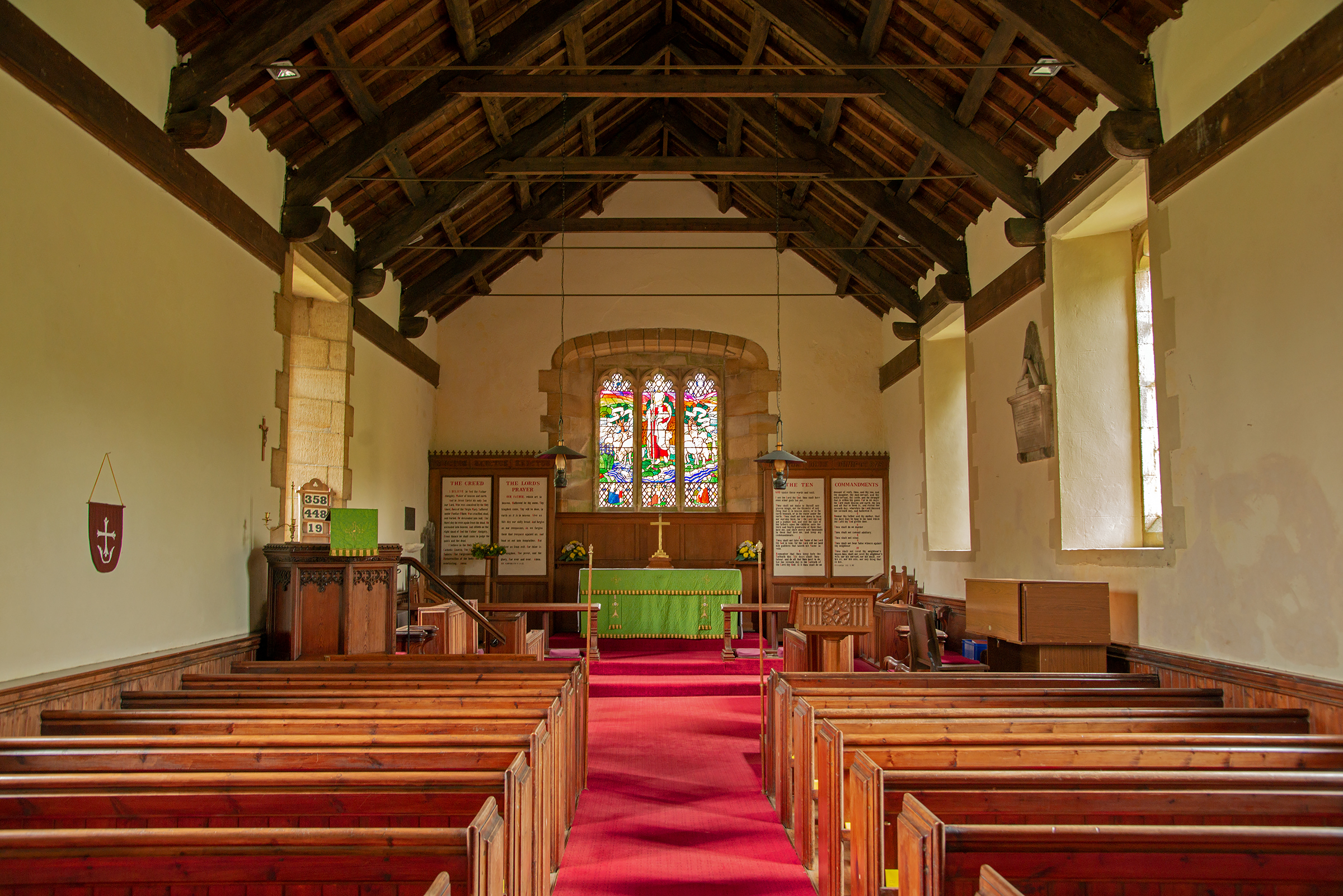
Interior, St Mary's

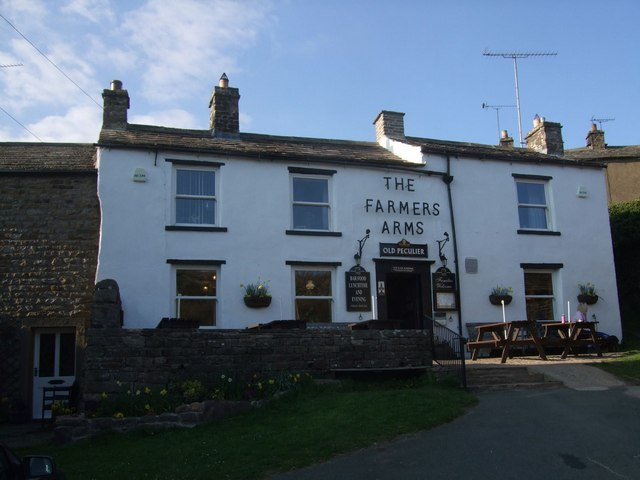
The Farmers Arms, the village's only pub

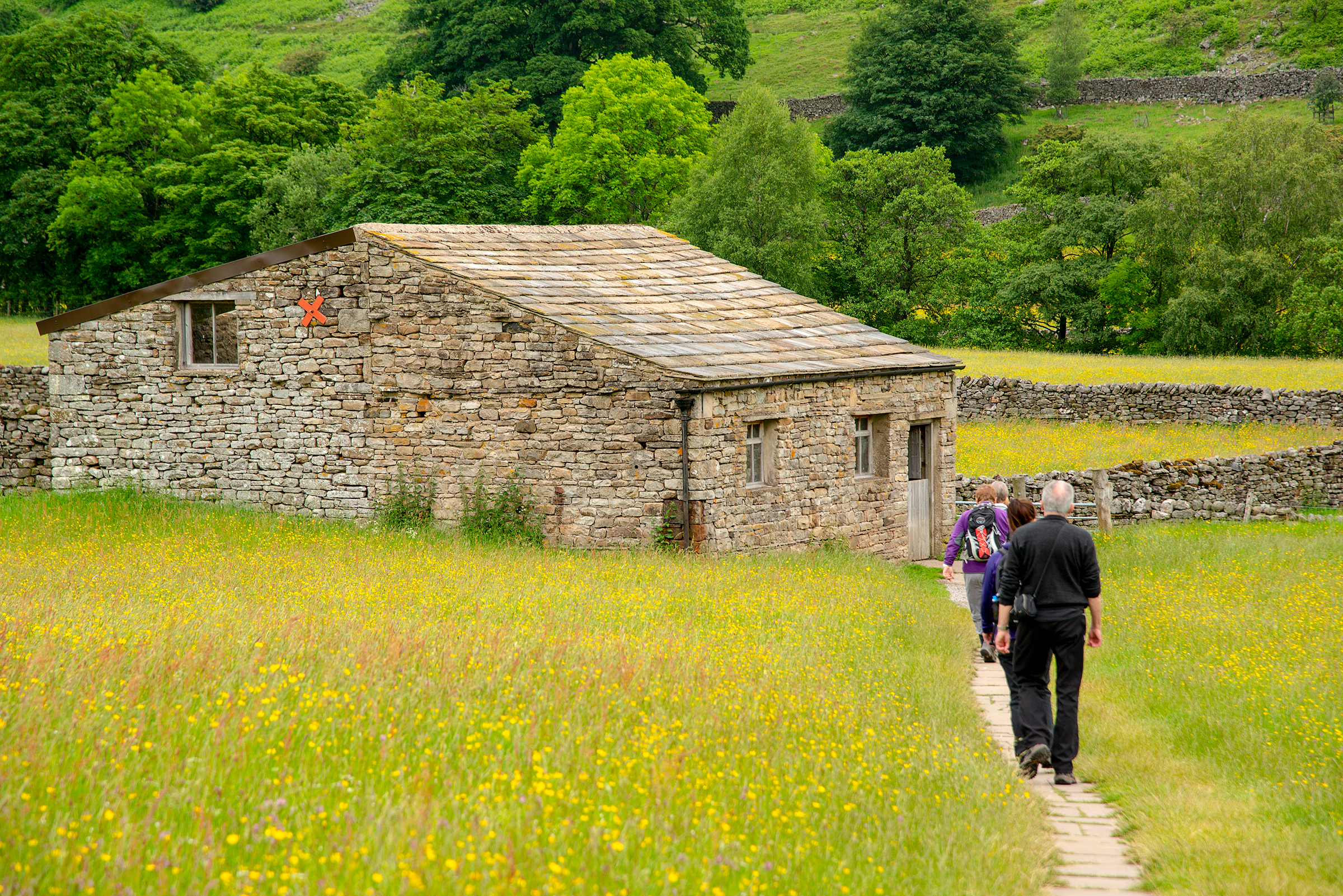
Tourists walking on a footpath, approaching a field barn in Muker
