= Angram Grange =

Civil parish in North Yorkshire, England

Coordinates: 54.185°N 1.213°W

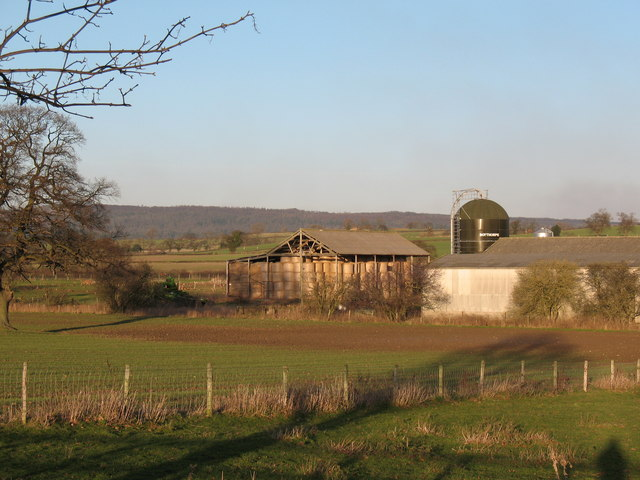
Farm buildings at Angram Hall

Angram Grange is a small civil parish in the county of North Yorkshire, England, about 7 miles south-east of Thirsk. According to the 2001 census it had a population of 17. In 2015 the population was estimated at 20.

The parish was originally a township in the parish of Coxwold.

From 1974 to 2023 it was part of the Hambleton District, it is now administered by the unitary North Yorkshire Council.
