= Keld United Reformed Church =

Building in Keld, North Yorkshire, England

Coordinates: 54°24′20″N 2°09′59″W

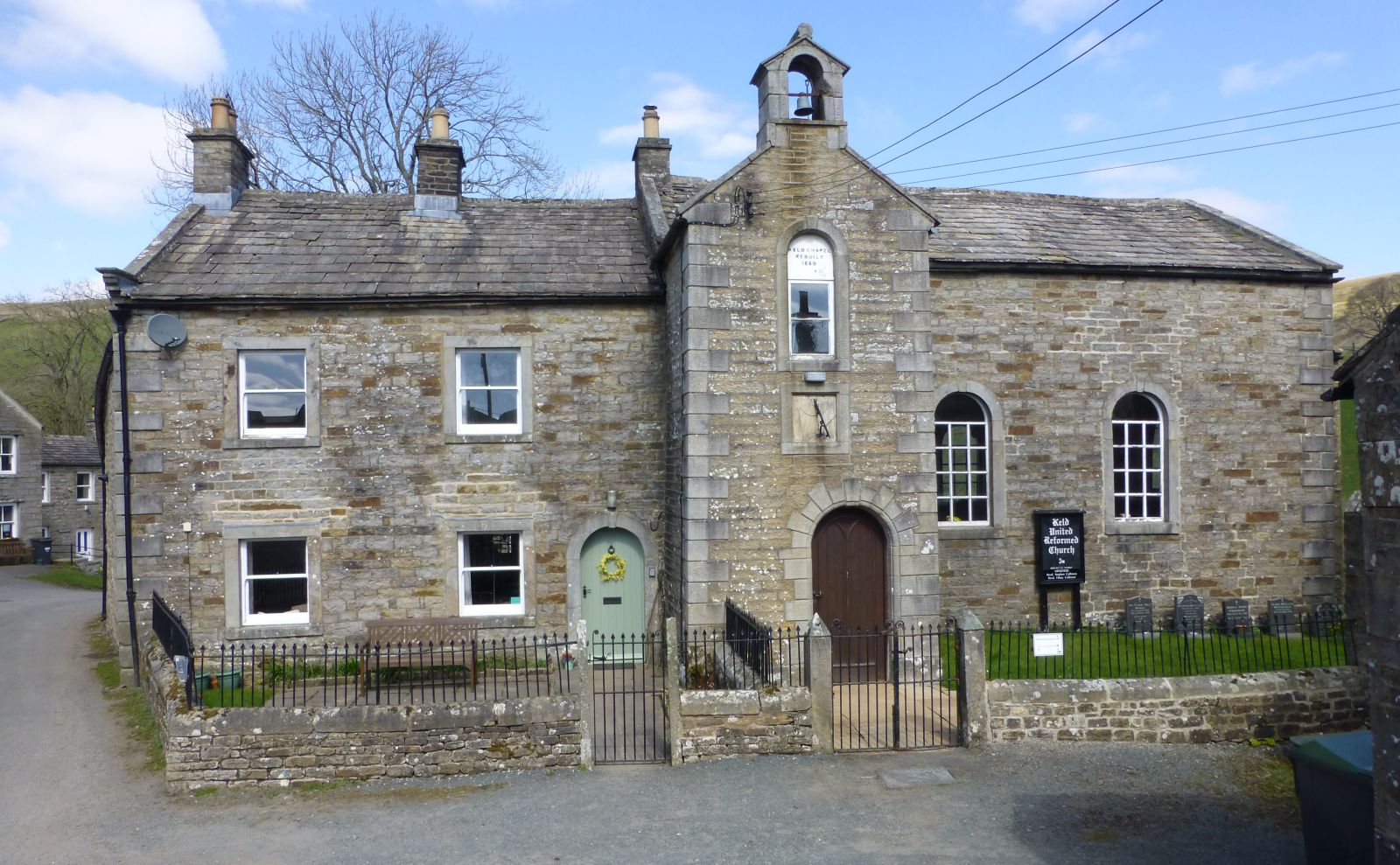
The church, in 2019

Keld United Reformed Church is a historic building in Keld, North Yorkshire, a village in England.

John Leland recorded a chapel in Keld in 1540. It was disused by 1695, when it was walled up, and was in ruins by 1706. In 1789, the congregationalist Edward Stillman resolved to build a new church on the site, which was enlarged in about 1820. In 1861, the chapel was rebuilt and enlarged, at a cost of £306 10s. The chapel joined the Congregational Union of England and Wales, which later became part of the United Reformed Church. The building was grade II listed in 1986. In 2009, the Keld Resource Centre converted the attached manse into holiday accommodation.

The chapel and manse are built of stone, with rusticated quoins, and a stone slate roof with stone copings. The chapel to the right has a single storey, and contains two round-arched sash windows. In the centre is a two-storey gabled porch with a round-arched gabled bellcote. The porch contains a round-arched doorway with a quoined surround, voussoirs and a moulded arris, above which is a sundial. Over this is a round-arched opening with a keystone, containing a window and an inscribed and dated panel. The manse has two storeys and two bays, and contains a round-arched doorway with a keystone and sash windows. In front, there is a low wall with saddleback coping and wrought iron railings. The gate piers to the manse have pointed caps, and those to the chapel have pyramidal caps. Inside the chapel is a west gallery, a recess with a reading desk, a carved minister's seat, a decorative case iron dais and two memorial slabs, one to Stillman.

== See also ==
- Listed buildings in Muker
