= Tan Hill Inn =

Listed pub in North Yorkshire, England

- The pub in 2026
- Interactive map of the Tan Hill Inn area
- Former names: The Kings Pit

General information
- Type: Public house
- Location: Tan Hill, North Yorkshire, England
- Coordinates: 54°27′20″N 2°9′37″W
- Year built: Early to mid-18th century
- Renovated: Mid-19th and late 20th century (altered)

Design and construction
- Designations

Listed Building – Grade II
- Official name: Tan Hill Inn
- Designated: 17 June 1976
- Reference no.: 1159627

Website
- tanhillinn.com

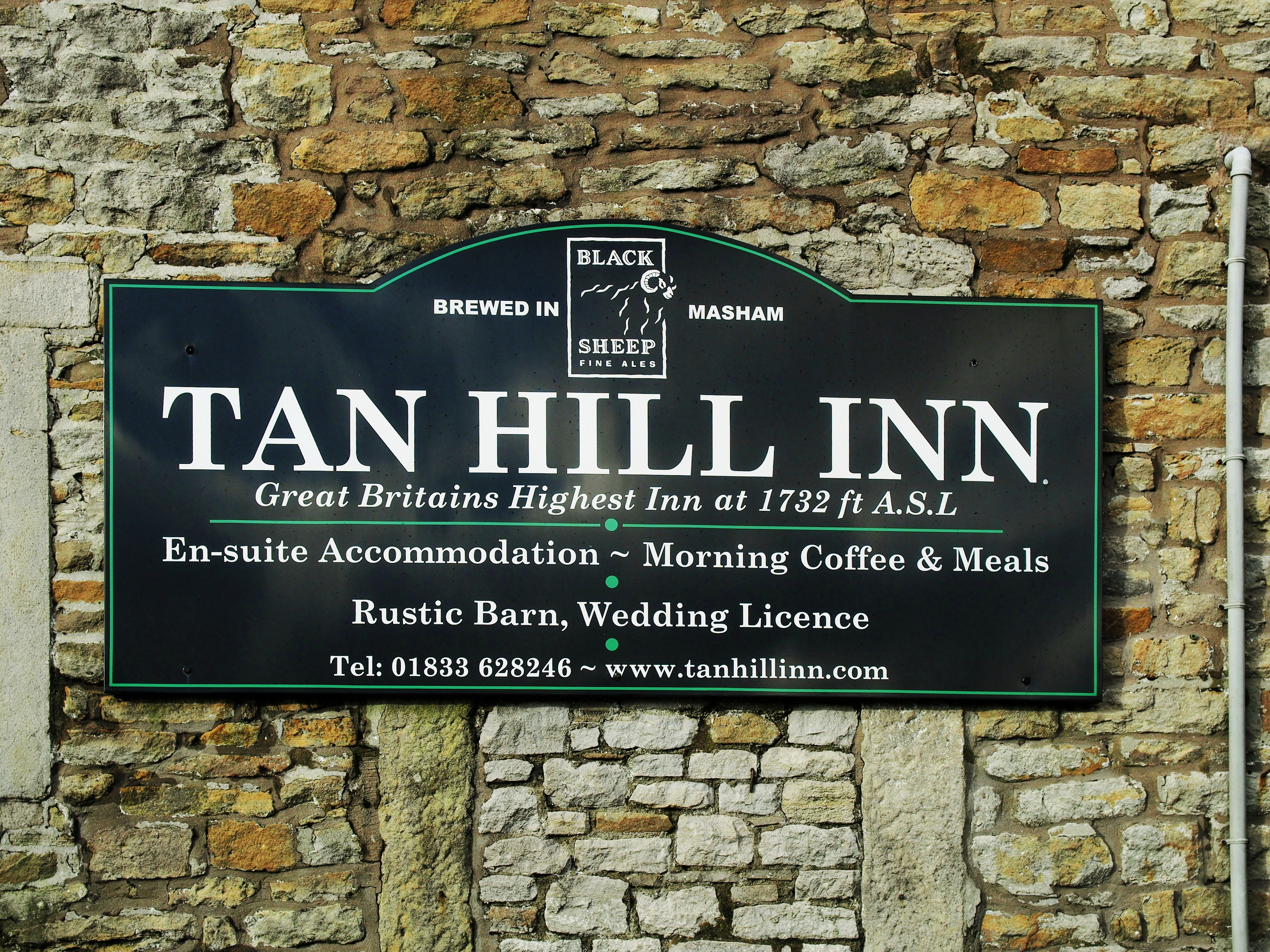
Tan Hill Inn sign in 2013

The Tan Hill Inn is a Grade II listed public house at Tan Hill, North Yorkshire, England. It is the highest inn in the British Isles at 1,732 feet (528 m) above sea level. According to the Guinness Book of World Records, it is slightly higher than the Cat and Fiddle Inn in the Peak District, which is at 1,690 feet (520 m).

== History ==
The building dates from the early to mid-18th century, and was used as a hostelry by workers digging coal pits, which is reflected in its earlier name, The Kings Pit. It is unusual for its isolation, but it was previously surrounded by miners' cottages. In addition to miners, farmers and pedlars, frequent visitors at the inn included drovers leading cattle to the coal pits.

After the closure of the last mine in 1929, and demolition of the associated cottages in the early 1930s, the pub remained open due to the patronage of local farmers and the development of the motor car.

From 1974, boundary changes moved it into County Durham, but this was reviewed in 1987 after much protest, and it reverted to within the Yorkshire boundary. In 1995, the Tan Hill Inn became the first pub in the UK to be granted a licence to hold weddings and civil ceremonies, after new laws were established to allow couples to marry in places other than churches or register offices.

The pub is a free house and has served a range of beers from the Black Sheep and Theakston breweries. Visiting bands have included Arctic Monkeys, Mark Ronson and British Sea Power.

In May 2007, Kentucky Fried Chicken (KFC) threatened legal action against the Tan Hill Inn for trademark infringement over the use of the term "Family Feast" on the inn's Christmas Day menu, but on 10 May 2007, KFC confirmed that it would not be pursuing the case.

Revellers celebrating New Year's Eve at the pub in December 2009 were unable to leave for three days as they were snowed in. The pub made headlines worldwide once again in November 2021, when Storm Arwen brought heavy snowfall, trapping patrons inside for a weekend. A reunion was held at the pub in December the following year. In January 2025, six bar staff and 23 guests were rescued after a five-day enforced stay following the New Year's celebration as they were snowed in.

=== Plans for improvement ===
In July 2017, the pub was put up for sale by landlady Louise Peace who had run it for 13 years with her husband Mike. Since mid-2018, owner Andrew Hields has been restoring the character to the inn. A report at the time indicated that the owners planned to open the barn as a carvery and to add a second bar. In 2019, the facility was encouraging camper vans, caravans and campers to stay for a modest nightly fee, and a venue for live music acts was in operation. The guest rooms were refurbished in 2019, and electrical work completed; the other plans for improvements were still in the works. Additional plans included a rustic spa and outdoor pool.

== Media appearances ==
During the 1980s the pub appeared in an advert starring Ted Moult for replacement-window company Everest, and it appeared in the first Vodafone advert, broadcast during the 1990s. Everest returned in 2008 to film a new advert with Craig Doyle and installed new windows and solar panels. The inn was visited by James May and Oz Clarke in Oz and James Drink to Britain, first broadcast in 2009. In late 2017, the inn again featured in TV coverage, for Waitrose supermarkets' Christmas advertising campaign.

In May 2019, scenes for ITV show Vera were filmed, for an episode aired in January 2020. The pub has also featured in The Inspector Lynley Mysteries, Murder in Mind, Top Gear, The Fast Show, Wish You Were Here...?, All Creatures Great and Small, and Jude the Obscure. In December 2022, it was featured in the Channel 5 documentary series Beyond the Yorkshire Farm, in scenes filmed that August.
