= Richmondshire =

Former local government district in England

Richmondshire District
- Non-metropolitan district
- Coat of arms

- Shown within North Yorkshire
- Sovereign state: United Kingdom
- Constituent country: England
- Region: Yorkshire and the Humber
- Administrative county: North Yorkshire
- Admin. HQ: Richmond

Government
  - Type: Richmondshire District Council
  - Leadership: Alternative – Sec.31
  - Executive
  - MPs: Rishi Sunak

Area
  - Total: 509 sq mi (1,319 km^{2})

Population (2021)
  - Total: 50,358
  - Density: 98.88/sq mi (38.18/km^{2})
- Time zone: UTC+0 (Greenwich Mean Time)
  - Summer (DST): UTC+1 (British Summer Time)
- ONS code: 36UE (ONS); E07000166 (GSS)
- Ethnicity: 97.0% White; 1.5% S.Asian
- Website: richmondshire.gov.uk Archived 27 March 2014 at the Wayback Machine

Richmondshire was a local government district of North Yorkshire, England, from 1974 to 2023. It covered a large northern area of the Yorkshire Dales including Swaledale and Arkengarthdale, Wensleydale and Coverdale, with the prominent Scot's Dyke and Scotch Corner along the centre. Teesdale lay to the north. With a total area of 1,319 km^{2}, it was larger than seven of the English ceremonial counties (namely, in decreasing order of size, the West Midlands, Merseyside, Tyne & Wear, Rutland, the Isle of Wight, Bristol, and the City of London).

== History ==
=== Ancient history ===
The history of this district in antiquity is not well known, but archaeologists have found artefacts from the Neolithic Period (4000–2000 BC), the Bronze Age (2500–2000 BC), the Iron Age (700 BC–first century AD) and the Roman Period (43–400 AD) in the Richmond area.

The closest important Roman settlement was at Catterick in Rheged, and was the site of the Battle of Catterick.

=== Medieval history ===
At the terminus of Scandinavian York, there was a local bout of rebellion in Stainmore, which resulted in the death of Eric Bloodaxe. The Scandinavian settlement of this area was eastwards from the Irish Sea with names such as Gilpatrick in Middleham and Thorfinn in Bedale occurring at the time of the Domesday Book. At the time of the Norman Conquest it was the Fee of Gillingshire, held by Edwin, Earl of Mercia. Gillingshire was made up of the Borough of Richmond and the five wapentakes of Gilling West, Gilling East, Hang West, Hang East and Hallikeld.

After the Harrying of the North, the land became capital of the Duchy of Brittany's Honour of Richmond (first as a barony, then an earldom and later a dukedom).

The Honour of Richmond was one of the three largest lordships created by William the Conqueror. King William granted it to his double-second-cousin, Alan the Red, the leader of the Bretons in England and a cousin of Hawise, Duchess of Brittany.

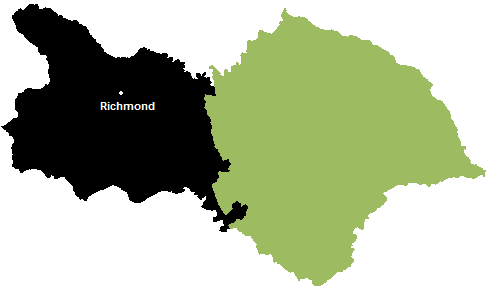
Traditional Richmondshire

According to the Register of the Honour of Richmond, the official transfer of the lands of Earl Edwin (Richmondshire) occurred at the "Siege of York" in 1068 or early 1069. Edwin's brother Morcar, Earl of Northumbria, lost his title to Robert Commines on 28 January 1069 and also lost lands to Count Alan following the brothers' participation in the northern rebellion of 1068.

A charter of Count Alan Rufus's dated before 1086 states that he obtained the honour with the help of Queen Matilda. Alan had many other English estates, and by the time of the compilation of the Domesday Book he was one of the richest and most powerful barons. He died in 1093 and was succeeded by two of his brothers in turn. The family held on to this estate until 1399. Work on Richmond Castle started in 1071 after the northern rebellions had died down.

The Honour of Richmond comprised 782 manors throughout England. The Yorkshire portion was a compact unit of 199 manors and 43 outlying properties situated near the main roads from Scotland into the Vale of York.

Richmondshire became an appanage of the English Royal Family during the reign of Edward III of England. In 1525 Henry FitzRoy, 1st Duke of Richmond and Somerset (1519–1536) became Lord Warden of the Marches and Lord President of the Council of the North while living at Sheriff Hutton.

One of the most distinctive forenames of Richmondshire folk was Marmaduke.

==== Ecclesiastical divisions ====
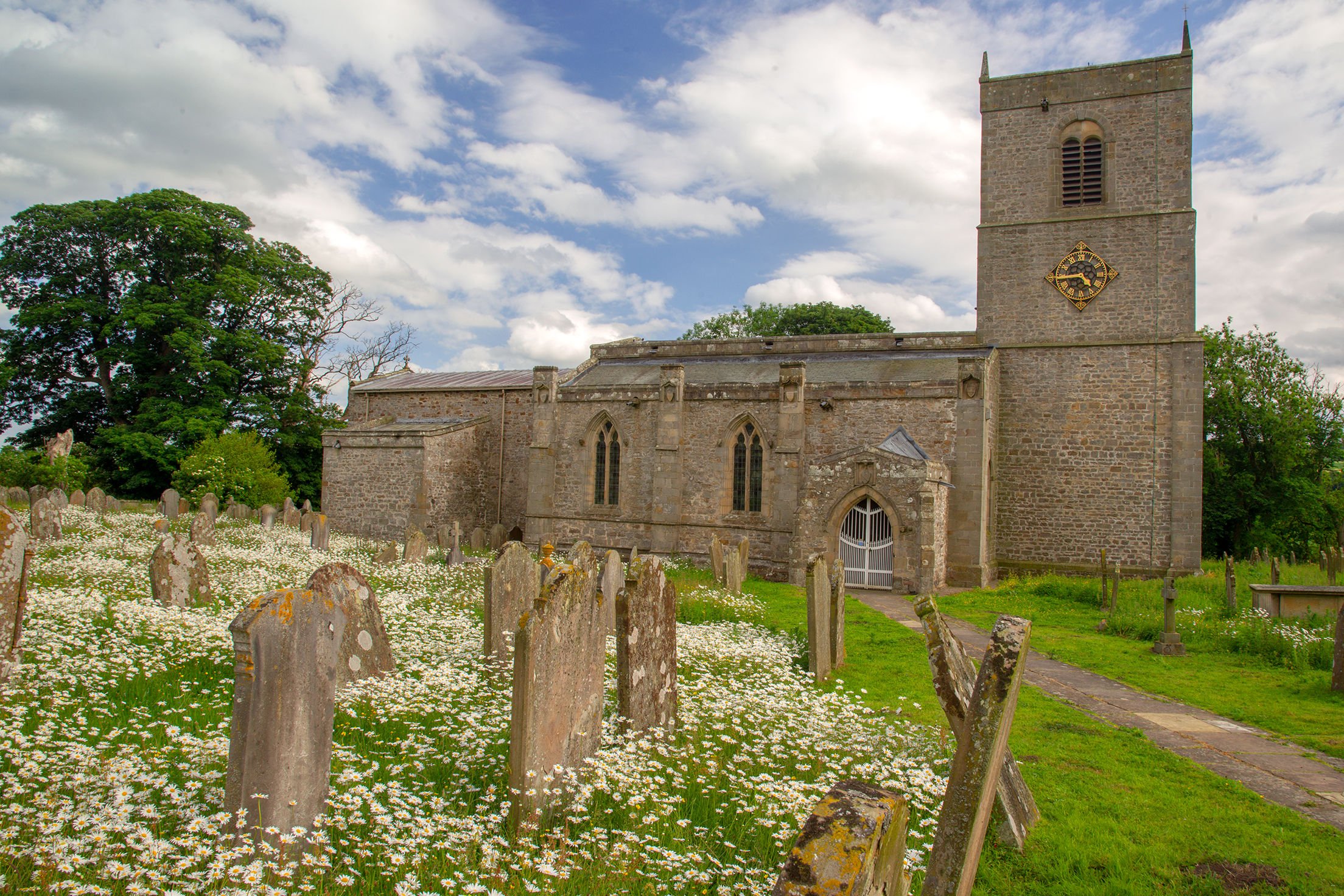
Holy Trinity, Wensley, a 13th-century church built on eighth-century foundations

St. Paulinus baptised the locals in the River Swale and as a result, it was known as the "Jordan of England".

Richmondshire is an archdeaconry which historically consisted of present-day Richmondshire and the Barony of Kendal in Westmorland, Copeland in Cumberland and what is now Lancashire north of Ribblesdale, such as Amounderness and Lonsdale.

After originally composing part of the Diocese of York, it was transferred to the Diocese of Chester, before moving into the Diocese of Ripon and Leeds and finally the Diocese of Leeds (known informally as the 'Diocese of West Yorkshire and the Dales' for a period, although this term has now fallen out of use).

=== Modern history ===
The 1861 Epsom Derby winner Kettledrum was bred at a stables in Croft-on-Tees during 1858.

Catterick army camp constructed in 1914, following the outbreak of the First World War and it remains in use to this day.

The modern district was formed on 1 April 1974, under the Local Government Act 1972. It was a merger of the municipal borough of Richmond with the Aysgarth Rural District, Leyburn Rural District, Reeth Rural District and Richmond Rural District along with part of the Croft Rural District, all in the North Riding of Yorkshire.

Stage 1 of the Tour de France ran from Leeds to Harrogate via the village of Reeth on 5 July 2014.

- See: Richmondshire District Council for details of the former political makeup.

In July 2021 the Ministry of Housing, Communities and Local Government announced that in April 2023, the non-metropolitan county of North Yorkshire would be reorganised into a unitary authority. On 1 April 2023, Richmondshire District Council was abolished and its functions transferred to a new unitary authority named North Yorkshire.

== Economy ==
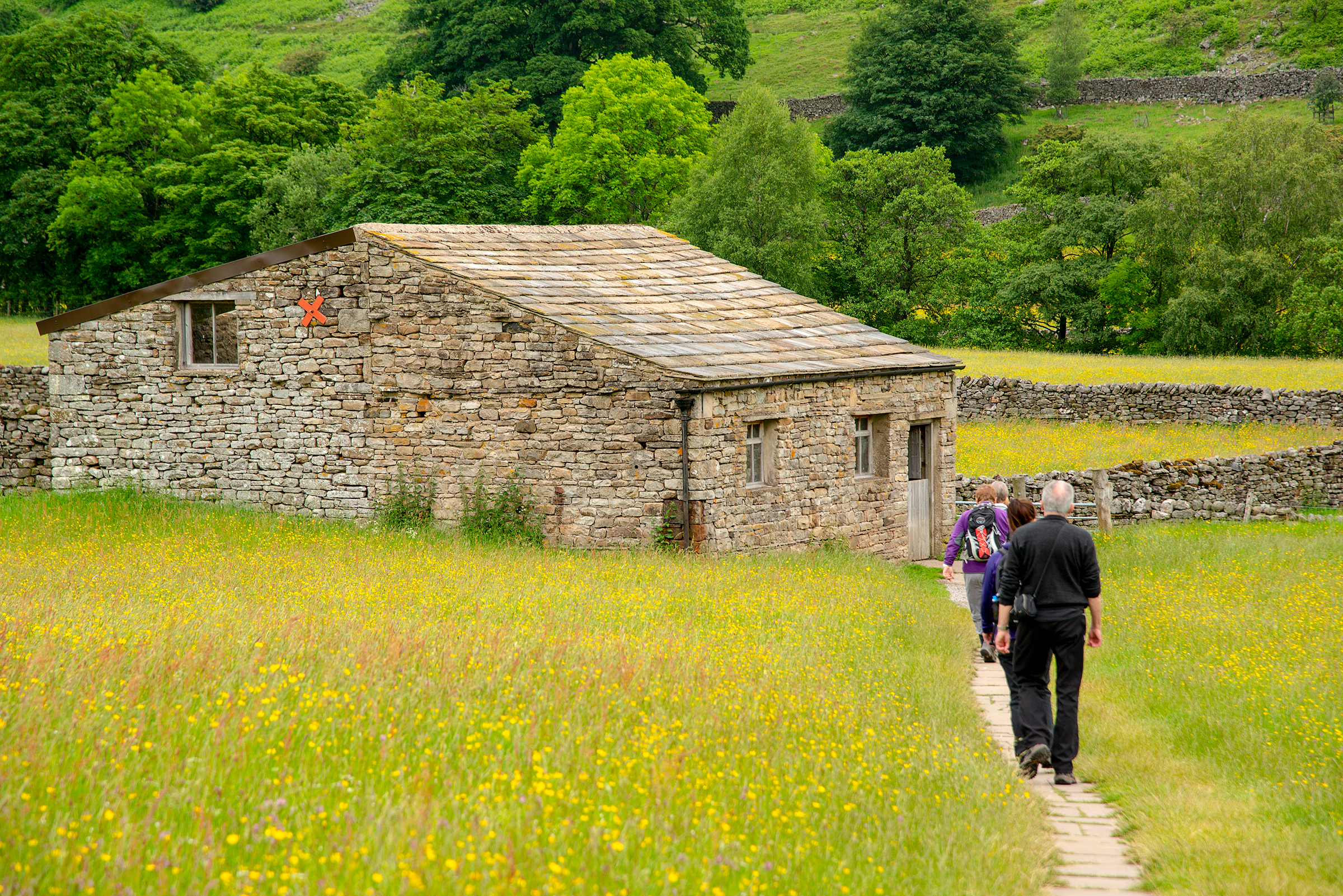
Tourists approaching a field barn in Muker

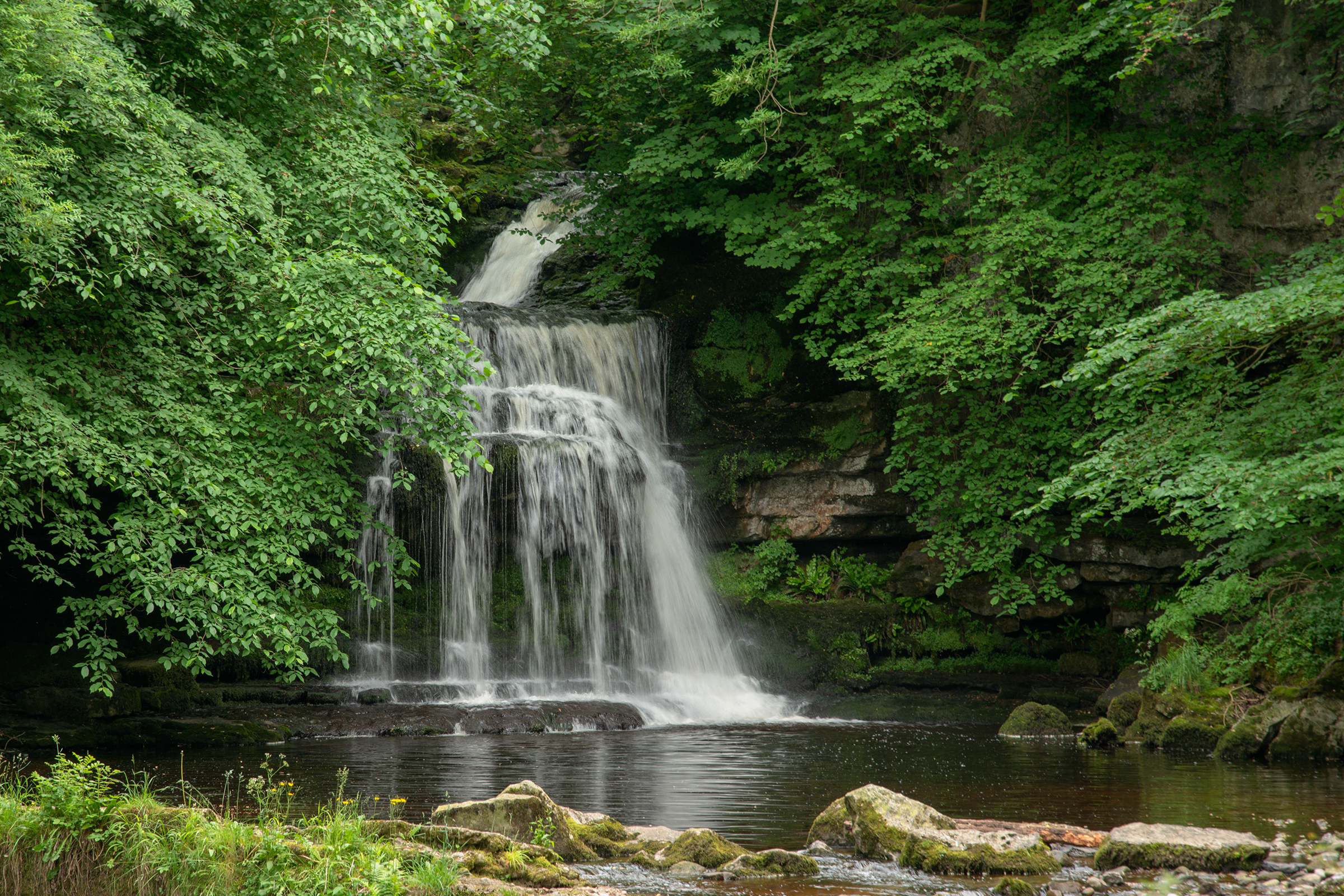
Cauldron Force, West Burton

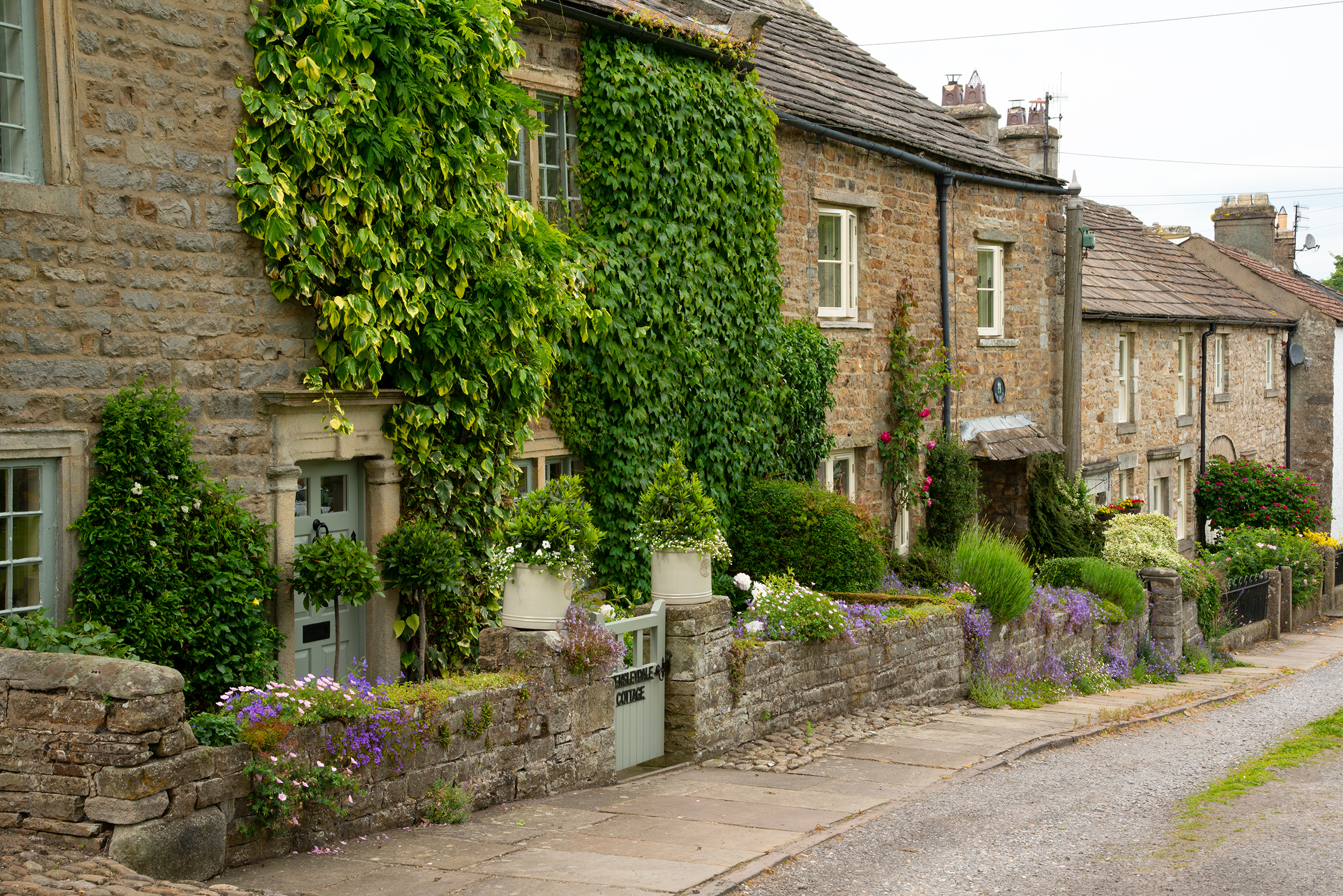
Historic homes in West Burton

The region is heavily agricultural but there are also many commercial enterprises, supported by four main business associations: Richmond Business and Tourism Association, Swaledale and Arkengarthdale Business Association, Lower Wensleydale Business Network and Upper Wensleydale Business Association. Tourism is an important part of the economy with some visitors attracted by the Yorkshire Dales. In 2014, roughly 3.62 million people visited the area; tourism provided some £225 million to the economy and supported 3,860 full time jobs. There are many hiking trails in the region as well as various attractions. Travellers using the Trip Advisor site particularly recommend Richmond Castle, Green Howards Museum, Georgian Theatre Royal, The Station, Millgate House Garden, Richmondshire Museum, Foxglove Covert Local Nature Reserve, Catterick Racecourse, The Friary Gardens War Memorial and Friary Tower and Gardens.

Potential stops for visitors include Hawes in Wensleydale, the home of Wensleydale cheese, Leyburn, a market town with many amenities, the quaint villages of Reeth, Wensley, West Burton and Muker, and Middleham with its castle and horse racing.

Catterick Garrison is also important to the economy, particularly around Richmond. It is the largest British Army garrison in the world with a population of around 13,000 and expected to continue growing.

== Media ==
In terms of television, the area is served by BBC North East and Cumbria and ITV Tyne Tees broadcasting from the Bilsdale transmitter.

Radio stations for the area are:

- BBC Radio York on 104.3 FM
- BBC Radio Tees on 95.0 FM
- Greatest Hits Radio York and North Yorkshire on 103.5 FM
- Sun FM on 102.6 FM
- Dales Radio, a community based station that broadcast on 103 FM and 104.9 FM

The district is served by two local newspapers, North Yorkshire editions of the daily Northern Echo and the weekly Darlington & Stockton Times both published by Newsquest.

== Settlements ==
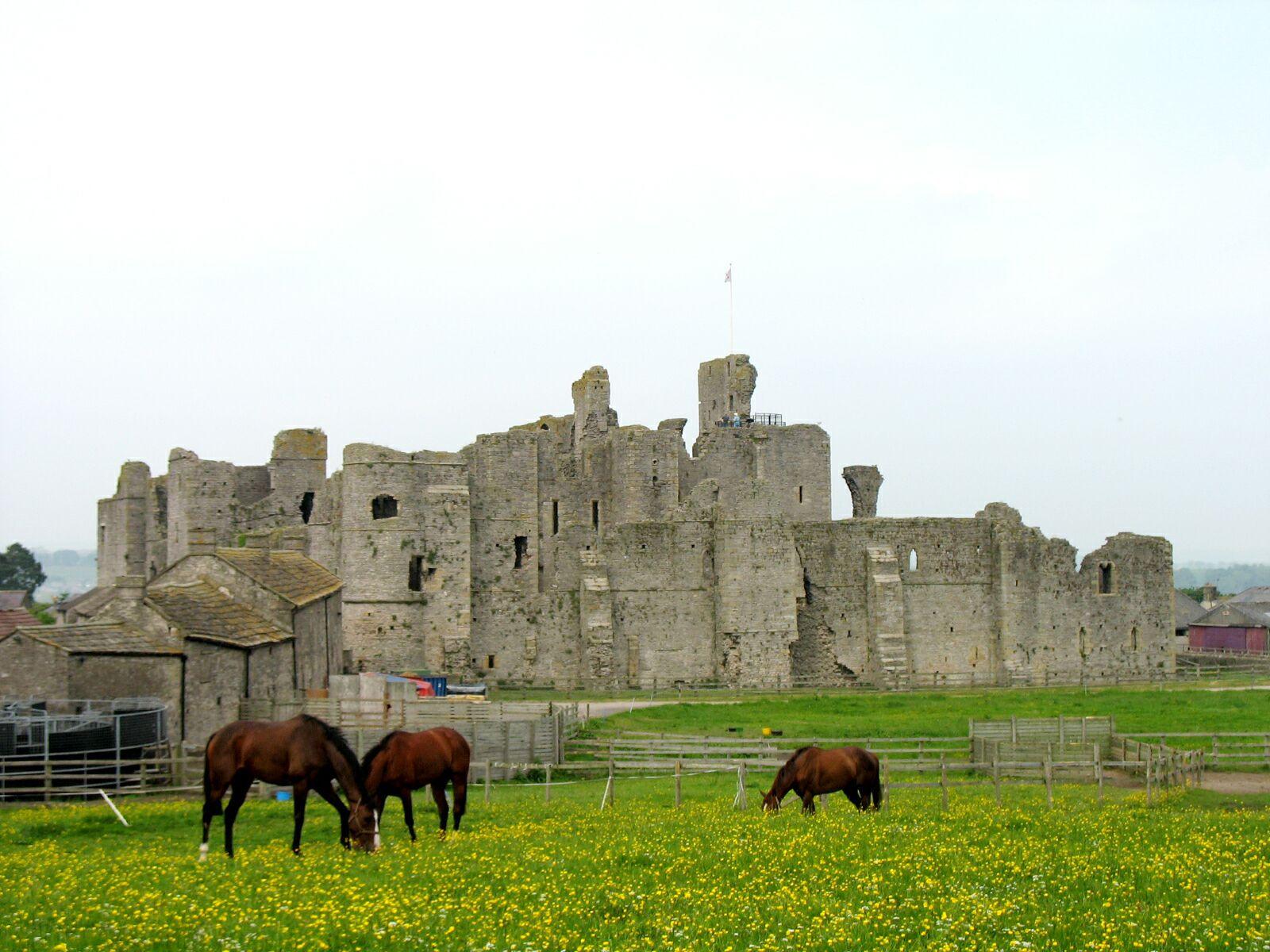
Middleham Castle

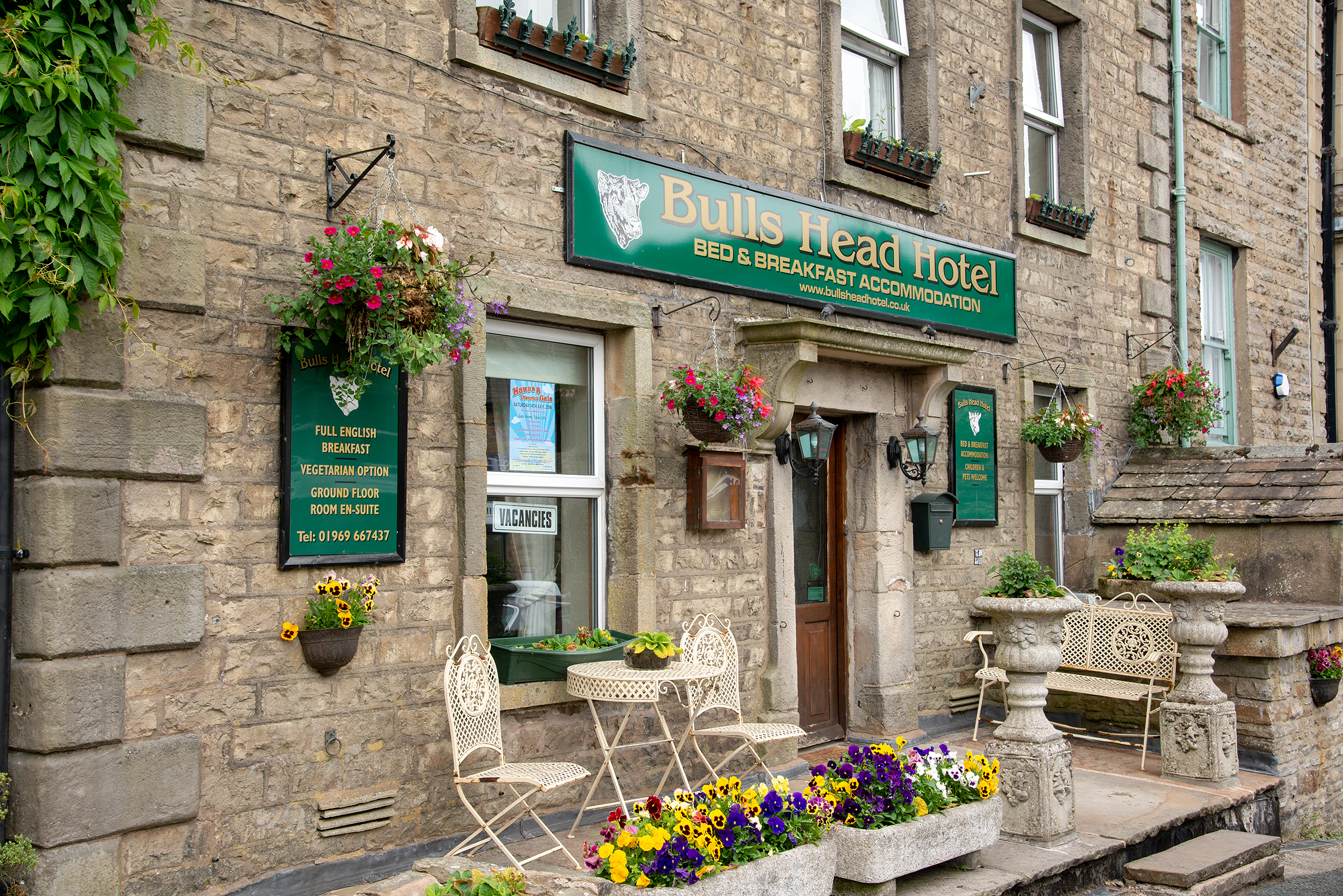
A traditional pub with rooms to let in Hawes

The former administrative area of Richmondshire included the major settlements of:

- Askrigg
- Barton
- Brough with St. Giles
- Catterick
- Catterick Garrison
- Colburn
- Croft-on-Tees
- Hawes
- Keld
- Leyburn
- Middleham
- Middleton Tyas
- Reeth
- Richmond

== See also ==
- Hallamshire
- Hexhamshire
- History of Yorkshire
- List of hundreds of England and Wales
- Winchcombeshire

== Bibliography ==
- The Pilgrimage of Grace: The rebellion that shook Henry VIII's throne by Geoffrey Moorhouse
- The Wars of the Roses by John Gillingham
- The Pilgrimage of Grace: and the politics of the 1530s by R. W. Hoyle.
- The Penguin Illustrated History of Britain and Ireland: from earliest times to the present day by Barry Cunliffe, Robert Bartlett (historian), John Morrill (historian), Asa Briggs and Joanna Burke
- The Swale: A history of the Holy River of St Paulinus by David Morris
- The Honour of Richmond: a history of the lords, earls and dukes of Richmond by David Morris
- Conquest, Anarchy & Lordship: Yorkshire, 1066–1154 by Paul Dalton
- Albion's Seed: Four British Folkways in America by David Hackett Fischer
- Yorkshire Dales by Ron Scholes
- 'Richmondshire: Introduction', A History of the County of York North Riding: Volume 1 by William Page
- Richmond: Geographical and Historical information from the year 1890 from Bulmer's History and Directory of North Yorkshire (1890)
- The Early History of Bedale by H. B. McCall
- "By any name, June brings summer" in The Northern Echo
- A Dictionary of First Names, Oxford University Press ISBN 0-19-280050-7

54.330°N 2.012°W
