= Keld, North Yorkshire =

Village in North Yorkshire, England

Coordinates: 54°24′21″N 2°10′00″W

Keld
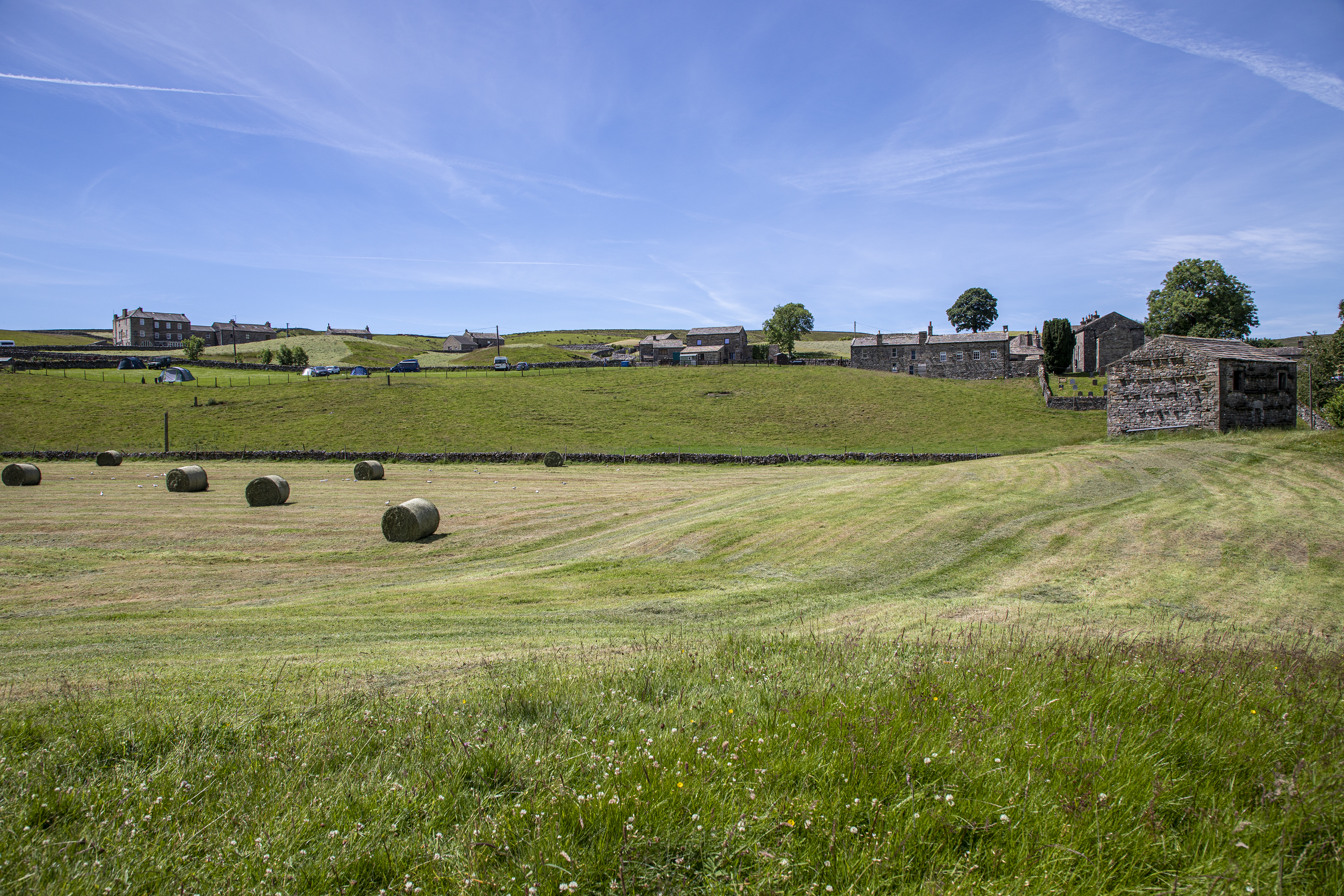
- Keld looking westwards

- Location within North Yorkshire
- OS grid reference: NY8901
- Civil parish: Muker
- Unitary authority: North Yorkshire
- Region: Yorkshire and the Humber
- Country: England
- Sovereign state: United Kingdom
- Post town: RICHMOND
- Postcode district: DL11
- Dialling code: 01748
- Police: North Yorkshire
- Fire: North Yorkshire
- Ambulance: Yorkshire
- UK Parliament: Richmond and Northallerton

Keld is a village in the civil parish of Muker, in the English county of North Yorkshire. It is in Swaledale, and the Yorkshire Dales National Park. The name derives from the Viking word Kelda meaning a spring and the village was once called Appletre Kelde – the spring near the apple trees.

From 1974 to 2023 it was part of the district of Richmondshire. It is now administered by the unitary North Yorkshire Council.

Keld is the crossing point of the Coast to Coast Walk and the Pennine Way long-distance footpaths at the head of Swaledale, and marks the end of the Swale Trail, a 20 km mountain bike trail which starts in Reeth. A footpath called the "Corpse Way" leads to Grinton, historically the nearest burial ground. At the height of the lead-mining industry in Swaledale in the late 19th century, several notable buildings – now Grade II listed – were erected: they include the Congregational and Methodist chapels, the school and Keld Literary Institute.

== Keld Resource Centre ==
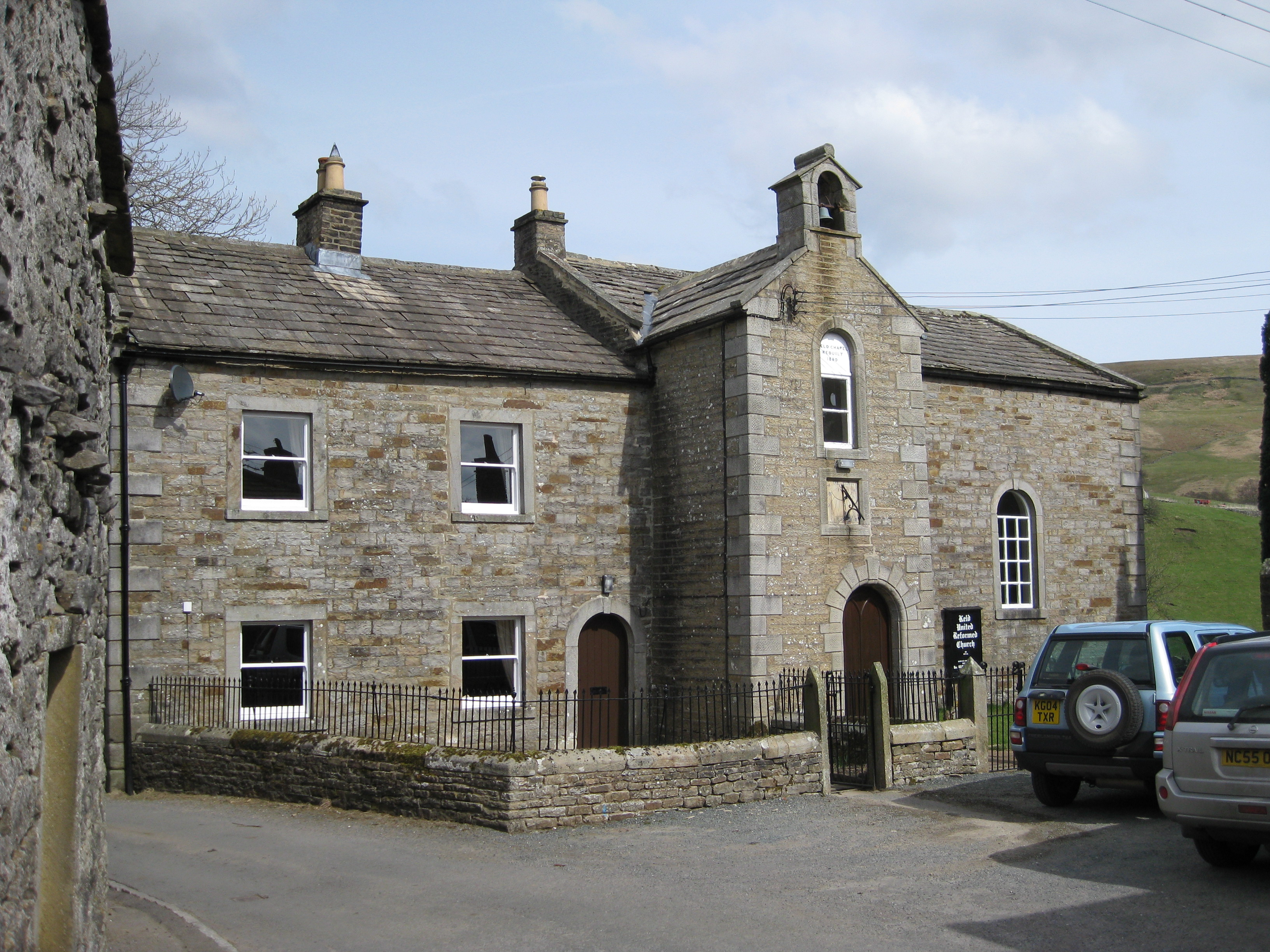
Keld United Reformed Church and Manse

The Keld Resource Centre, a local charity, is restoring a series of listed buildings in the village centre and returning them to community use. The first phase involved restoring the Manse, the minister's house attached to Keld United Reformed Church, which was completed in 2009 and is now used as a holiday cottage, proceeds from which support the Centre's work.

The Keld Countryside and Heritage Centre opened in 2011; it provides interpretation of the countryside, buildings and social history of Keld, and displays of artefacts relevant to Upper Swaledale. It is open throughout the year, operating alongside The Upper Room, which is used for meetings, exhibitions, workshops and social events. A range of guided walks, exhibitions, talks and other activities take place during the summer months.

The Resource Centre's completed projects include:

- The Manse – the former Minister's house adjoining the URC Church was refurbished in 2009. It is now available to let as a holiday cottage. Proceeds from lettings are used to fund the centre's future projects.
- The Well-being Garden (2010), a patch of unkempt land in the chapel churchyard has been turned into a quiet, meditative garden from which visitors can contemplate their inner well-being amidst the beautiful natural scenery of Upper Swaledale.
- The Countryside and Heritage Centre – a former stables has now become a small visitor and interpretation centre, was opened on 14 May 2011, providing information about the countryside and local community. There is a display of historical items relevant to Upper Swaledale curated by the Swaledale Museum in Reeth. The centre is open all year.

Keld Old School Museum and the Keld Literary Institute have also been restored. The Resource Centre is developing plans to restore the Methodist Chapel and further projects will involve restoring Keld’s former school.

== Crackpot Hall ==
The ruins of Crackpot Hall lie about a mile east of Keld on the northern slope of the dale at grid reference NY906008. There may have been a building on this site since the 16th century when a hunting lodge was maintained for Thomas, the first Baron Wharton, who visited the Dale occasionally to shoot the red deer. Survey work by the Yorkshire Dales National Park Authority has shown that the building has changed many times over the years. At one time it even had a heather or "ling" thatched roof.

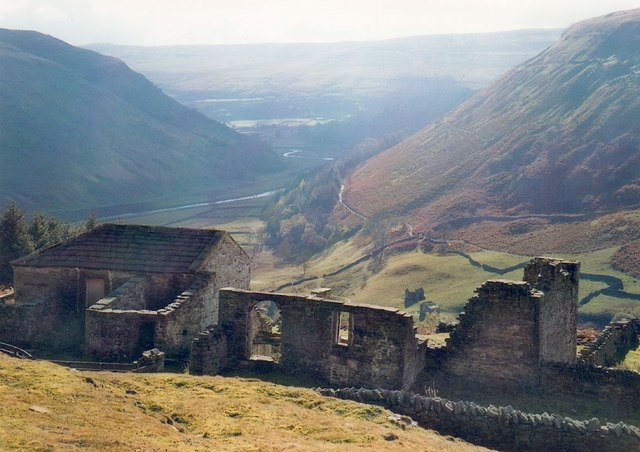
Crackpot Hall and view of Swaledale

The current ruin is of a farmhouse dating from the mid 18th century. It was an impressive two-storey building with a slate roof and matching "shippons" or cowsheds at each end for animals. The building may also have been used as mine offices, as intensive lead mining was carried out in the area, and there were violent disputes over mine boundaries in the 18th century.

In the 1930s Ella Pontefract and Marie Hartley wrote of a wild 4-year-old child named Alice. On 7 November 2015, BBC Radio 3 broadcast a documentary about the story in the Between the Ears strand titled Alice at Crackpot Hall.

The current building was abandoned in the 1950s because of subsidence. Crackpot Hall has been saved from further decay by Gunnerside Estate with the aid of grants from the Millennium Commission and European Union through the Yorkshire Dales Millennium Trust.

The name Crackpot is said to mean "a deep hole or chasm that is a haunt of crows".

== Other facilities ==
A tea room and small shop operate at Park Lodge from Easter to autumn. Out of season, local volunteers provide a self service café for visitors in the village's Public Hall. Keld's Youth Hostel closed in 2008 and has since reopened as Keld Lodge, a hotel with bar and restaurant. There is a series of four waterfalls close to Keld in a limestone gorge on the River Swale: Kisdon Force, East Gill Force, Catrake Force and Wain Wath Force.

== See also ==
- Listed buildings in Muker
