= Holy Trinity Church, Melbecks =

Church in Melbecks, North Yorkshire, England

Coordinates: 54°22′53″N 2°01′21″W

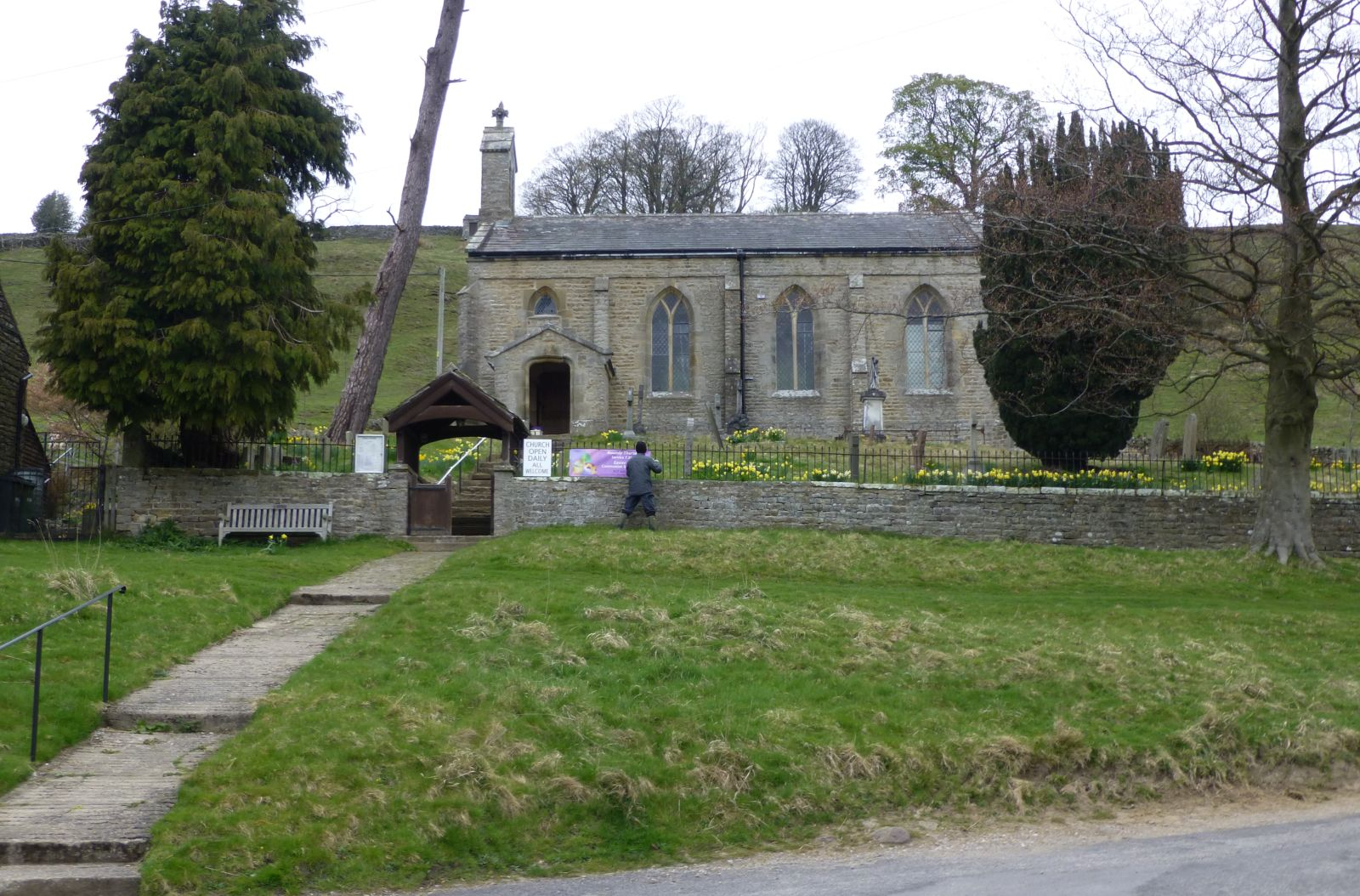
The church, in 2019

Holy Trinity Church is the parish church of Melbecks, an area of Swaledale in North Yorkshire, in England.

Until the mid 19th century, the Melbecks area fell within the parish of the Church of St Andrew, Grinton. A church in Low Row was completed in 1840, and the following year, it was given its own parish. It was restored in 1886, when the current pews were installed, while most other furnishings are later. The church was grade II listed in 1986.

The church is built of stone with a stone slate roof, and consists of a nave, a south porch, and a chancel. On the west gable is a double bellcote with corrugated copings and a floriated finial. The windows contain Y-shaped tracery. Inside is a west gallery, and a neo-Gothic altar rail which may date from 1840.

== See also ==
- Listed buildings in Melbecks
