= Listed buildings in Melbecks =

Melbecks is a civil parish in the county of North Yorkshire, England. It contains 53 listed buildings that are recorded in the National Heritage List for England. Of these, one is listed at Grade II*, the middle of the three grades, and the others are at Grade II, the lowest grade. The parish is in upper Swaledale, it is sparsely populated, and contains the settlements of Gunnerside, Low Row, Feetham and Kearton, and the surrounding countryside. Most of the listed buildings are houses, cottages and associated structures, farmhouses and farm buildings, and the others include a hotel and a public house, a bridge, a church and a chapel and associated structures, a former school, and two telephone kiosks.

== Key ==
Grade	Criteria
II*	Particularly important buildings of more than special interest
II	Buildings of national importance and special interest

== Buildings ==
Name and location	Photograph	Date	Notes	Grade
Punch Bowl Hotel; 54.38156°N 2.02142°W		1638	The hotel, which was extended later, is in stone with an artificial slate roof. There are three storeys and six bays. On the front are two doorways, the left with a quoined surround and a dated and initialled lintel. There is a blocked fire window with a moulded surround, and the other windows are sashes. On the right is a later projecting extension.	II
Brownberry Barn; 54.38450°N 2.02842°W		17th century	A house and a barn under one roof, in stone, with quoins, through stones, and a roof of stone slate and corrugated asbestos with stone coped gables. There are two storeys, and the building contains doorways and windows, some blocked, vents, and loft doors.	II
Calvertcote; 54.37943°N 2.07555°W	—	17th century	A house and a cottage under one roof, with through stones at the rear, and a stone slate roof with shaped kneelers and stone coping. There are two storeys and three bays. On the front are two doorways, a datestone, and sash windows.	II
Pursglove Cottage; 54.38204°N 2.03103°W	—	17th century	A house, cottage and outbuilding under one roof, in stone with a stone slate roof, shaped kneelers and stone coping. There are two storeys, four bays and a rear outshut. The house and cottage each have a doorway, there is one mullioned window, and the other windows are sashes. The outbuilding has a doorway with interrupted jambs and a sash window.	II
Gorton Lodge, walls, gate and gate piers 54.37492°N 2.03163°W	—	17th century	The lodge consists of a cottage with a house added in the 18th century, in sandstone with quoins, stone slate roofs with shaped kneelers and stone coping, and two storeys, The house has a moulded floor band and a moulded stone gutter. There are three bays, and a central doorway and sash windows, all with moulded architraves. The cottage to the right is lower, and has the remains of mullioned numbers. The garden wall is in stone with coping, and it contains wrought iron gates, and panelled stone gate piers, each on a plinth, and with a cornice and a pyramidal cap.	II
Ling Garth; 54.38208°N 2.01636°W	—	17th century	Two houses, later combined, in stone, with stone slate roof, shaped kneelers and stone copings. There are two storeys and the right house is lower. The left house has three bays and an outshut. The central doorway has quoined jambs, and a triangular soffit to the lintel, which contains a panel dated 1665. The right door has two bays, a rear outshut, and a doorway with quoined jambs. The left house has a fire window, the right house has a sash window, and both houses have casement windows and the remains of mullioned windows.	II
Paradise; 54.37642°N 2.02893°W	—	1653	A house with an attached manufactory, in stone on a boulder plinth, with a stone slate roof, stone copings and shaped kneelers, and three storeys. The house has three bays, and a central doorway with a quoined surround, and a lintel with inscribed and dated recessed panels. The manufactory to the left has two doorways, one with a chamfered surround. In both parts there is a mix of windows, some are mullioned, and others include casements and sashes, some horizontally-sliding. At the rear is an outshut with two cart sheds containing segmental arches, voussoirs and keystones.	II*
Moor View, Peat Gate House and two cottages 54.38174°N 2.02074°W		Late 17th century	A row of four cottages, of different dates, in stone, with a stone slate roof, stone coping and a shaped kneeler on the right, and two storeys. On the front are doorways, and windows, most of which are sashes, and there is also a fire window and a mullioned window.	II
Shoregill Head Farmhouse; 54.37999°N 2.09938°W	—	1679	The farmhouse is in stone on a boulder plinth, with quoins, and a stone slate roof with shaped kneelers and stone coping. There are two storeys, two bays, and a rear outshut. The doorway has a chamfered quoined surround and a triangular soffit to the lintel that contains a recessed dated panel, and a hood mould. The windows are mullioned, those on the ground floor with hood moulds.	II
Old House adjoining Feetham Farmhouse; 54.38168°N 2.01677°W	—	1682	The house, later divided into two, is in stone with a stone slate roof. There are two storeys, two bays, and a rear outshut. In the centre is a doorway with a quoined surround, and a triangular soffit to the lintel, which has inscribed initials and the date. To the right is an inserted doorway, there is a fire window, and the other windows are sashes. Under the outshut is a deep cellar.	II
Pratt's House and byre 54.38603°N 2.00666°W	—	1684	The farmhouse and byre are under one roof, and are in stone with a stone slate roof. There are two storeys and five bays. The doorway has a chamfered quoined surround, and a triangular soffit to the lintel that is inscribed with initials and the date. At the left is a large tractor opening, most of the windows are mullioned, and there is a fire window. At the rear is a shallow stair turret, and to the right is a byre with a doorway.	II
Birds Nest Close; 54.38434°N 2.01949°W	—	c. 1700	A cottage and attached barn in stone, with a stone slate roof, stone gables, and two storeys. The openings include doorways, a stable door, a taking-in door, and a window.	II
Park Hall; 54.38559°N 1.98989°W	—	1700	A farmhouse and a cottage, later combined, in stone, with a stone slate roof, stone coping, and shaped kneelers. There are two storeys, the house has three bays, the cottage has two, and there is a rear outshut. The house has a central doorway with shouldered jambs, and the cottage doorway has a plain surround. The windows in both parts are sashes. At the rear is a doorway with a quoined surround, a moulded arris, and an inscribed and dated lintel.	II
Gate piers west of Park Hall; 54.38561°N 1.99018°W	—	c. 1700	The two gate piers are in rusticated stone. Each pier has a cornice, convex capping and a ball finial.	II
Riddings West; 54.38023°N 2.02962°W	—	c. 1700	A pair of cottages from different dates, in stone, with stone slate roofs and stone copings. There are two storeys, two bays and a rear outshut. On the front are two doorways, the left with quoined jambs, and a moulded arris, and the right doorway with interrupted jambs. The windows are sashes and all the openings have sandstone surrounds. In the outshut are single-light windows with chamfered surrounds.	II
Turnip House and byre 54.37868°N 2.03522°W		c. 1700	The farmhouse and byre are under one roof, and are in stone on a boulder plinth, with a stone slate roof, shaped kneelers and coping, and two storeys. The house has quoins, two bays, and a rear outshut. It contains a central doorway flanked by jambs on splayed bases, sash windows on the front and mullioned windows on the outshut. The byre on he left projects forward; the byre and the outshut each have a doorway with interrupted jambs.	II
Glory Be and outbuildings 54.38168°N 2.03231°W		1706	The house and outbuilding are in stone, and have a stone slate roof with an elaborately shaped kneeler and stone coping on the right, and two storeys. The house has two bays, and a stair turret at the rear. The central doorway has a quoined surround, a moulded arris, and a lintel with two dated and initialled panels. There is a fire window with a chamfered surround, and the other windows are sashes. The outbuilding on the left projects as an outshut, and contains two doorways, a window and a vent.	II
Brockma Gill East; 54.38681°N 2.00334°W	—	1718	The cottage is in stone with quoins and a stone slate roof. There are two storeys and three bays. The central doorway has interrupted jambs with splayed bases, and a lintel containing an inscribed and dated panel. To its right is a blocked doorway with a sandstone surround. The windows vary, and include a blocked three-light mullioned window and later casements.	II
Croft Cottage, Croft House, Croft View and gate piers 54.37941°N 2.07601°W		1720	A row consisting of a house flanked by cottages, in rendered stone, that has a stone slate roof with copings. There are two storeys, the house has five bays, the cottages have one bay each, and there is a rear outshut. The house has a central doorway with a moulded surround, and sash windows. Each cottage has a doorway and sash windows. In the left return is an oculus with keystones. In front of the house is a low wall, and rusticated stone gate piers with cornices and caps.	II
Barf Side Farmhouse; 54.37761°N 2.04755°W	—	Early 18th century	The farmhouse is in stone, and has a stone slate roof with shaped kneelers and copings on the right. There are two storeys and three bays. In the centre is a doorway with a chamfered surround and interrupted jambs on plinth blocks. The windows on the front are casement windows with chamfered surrounds, and at the rear are two two-light mullioned windows.	II
Birds Nest; 54.38394°N 2.02012°W	—	Early 18th century	A row of cottages and animal houses with lofts above, in stone, with a stone slate roof and kneelers, and two storeys. On the front are various openings including doorways and sash windows, some horizontally-sliding, and at the rear are two blocked segment-headed windows.	II
Fair Acre; 54.38658°N 2.01036°W	—	Early 18th century	A house and a byre under one roof, in stone, with quoins and a stone slate roof with kneelers, and two storeys. The house has two bays and an outshut. There is a central doorway, the windows are sashes, and all the openings have moulded architraves. In the outshut is a doorway with interrupted jambs, and a window with a chamfered surround. The barn projects on the left, and contains a doorway, a vent, and a pitching door with a quoined surround.	II
High Roof; 54.38265°N 2.03259°W	—	Early 18th century	The house is in stone, with a stone slate roof, two storeys and three bays. The doorway has a chamfered surround and interrupted jambs, and the windows are sashes. In the right bay is a garage door.	II
Barf End; 54.38336°N 2.06387°W	—	Early to mid-18th century	The house is in stone with quoins, and a stone slate roof, partly roofless, There are two storeys and four bays, with a barn to the right, and two outshuts. On the front are doorways, and the windows are sashes.	II
Cantrells Barn; 54.38380°N 2.03138°W		18th century	A byre and a barn under one roof, in stone, with quoins, through stones, and a stone slate roof. There are two storeys, and the building contains doorways, windows and vents.	II
Dial House; 54.37961°N 2.07458°W	—	Mid-18th century	Two cottages, later combined into a house, in stone with a stone slate roof. There are two storeys and two bays. In the centre is a doorway with jambs on plinth blocks, and to the right is a blocked doorway. The windows are sashes, one with a chamfered surround.	II
Green Sike Farmhouse, cottage and outbuildings 54.38114°N 2.03951°W		Mid-18th century	The buildings are under one roof, they are in stone and have stone slate roofs with shaped kneelers and stone copings. The house has two storeys, two bays and a rear outshut. The doorway is in the centre, and the windows are sashes. The cottage to the right is slightly lower, and has two storeys, two bays, and a porch. To the right is a barn, and to the left are two byres, all with doorways.	II
Kings Head Inn; 54.37927°N 2.07649°W		18th century	The public house is in stone, with quoins, sill bands, a floor band, and a stone slate roof with shaped kneelers and stone coping. There are two storeys, three bays and a rear outshut. The doorway is in the centre, the windows are sashes, and all the openings have projecting stone surrounds.	II
Byre to west of Simon's Garth; 54.38161°N 2.03153°W	—	18th century	The byre is in stone, with quoins, through stones, and a stone slate roof with kneelers and stone copings. There are two storeys, and it contains two doorways on the ground floor and one on the upper floor.	II
Staining Farmhouse and byre 54.37926°N 2.03860°W	—	Mid-18th century	The farmhouse and byre are under one roof, and are in stone, with quoins, and a stone slate roof with kneelers and copings. There are two storeys and a rear outshut. The house has two bays, a central doorway with impost blocks, and sash windows. The byre to the right has two ground floor doorways, and a window on the upper floor.	II
Wardell Hall; 54.38048°N 2.02286°W	—	18th century	A house, cottage and farm buildings in one range, in stone with a stone slate roof, moulded kneelers and coping, and two storeys. The house has quoins, two bays and a rear outshut. It has a central entrance with Tuscan jambs, and to the west is an entrance with a moulded quoined surround, and a massive initialled and dated lintel. The windows are sashes. The farm buildings have various openings.	II
Ghyll View and Ghyll Edge; 54.38033°N 2.07740°W	—	Late 18th century	A pair of houses in stone with quoins on the left, and a stone slate roof with a shaped kneeler and stone coping on the left. There are two storeys and two bays. Each house has a doorway and sash windows.	II
High Cottage; 54.38260°N 2.03274°W	—	Late 18th century	The cottage is in stone, and has a stone slate roof with stone coping on the left. There are two storeys and two bays. The doorway to the right has a stone surround with impost blocks and a hood mould, and to the left is another doorway. There is one modern window, and the others are sashes.	II
House to east of Moorland Cottage; 54.38230°N 2.03194°W	—	Late 18th century	A house and cottage, later combined, in stone, with a stone slate roof and stone coping. There are two storeys and three bays. The house has a central doorway, flanked by bay windows connected over the doorway by a verandah with decorative edging. The cottage to the right has a doorway, and on the upper floors of both parts are sash windows.	II
Farm building, wall and gate pier west of the Old Post Office; 54.37905°N 2.02555°W	—	Late 18th century	The farm building is in stone with a hipped stone slate roof and two storeys. On the front is a doorway with a plain surround on plinths, to the right are external stone steps leading to an upper floor doorway, and to its left is a window. In the right return, facing the road, is an oculus, and attached to the building is a wall.	II
Gorton Farmhouse, coach house, stables and wall 54.37473°N 2.03208°W	—	1776	The farmhouse and outbuildings are in sandstone, with quoins, and a stone slate roof with shaped kneelers and copings. The house has three bays, a central doorway and sash windows. The other buildings contain a segmental coach arch with voussoirs, doorways and two circular windows. Further to the left is a single-storey stable containing a doorway and a semicircular window. The garden wall has flag coping, and contains a bee bole.	II
Stable block, Paradise; 54.37657°N 2.02854°W	—	1791	The stable block is in stone, and has a stone slate roof with shaped kneelers and stone copings, and two storeys. On the ground floor is a doorway with initials and the date. External stone steps lead up to an upper floor doorway with a plinth.	II
Spensley House; 54.37920°N 2.07899°W	—	c. 1820	The house is in sandstone, with quoins, a sill band, and a stone slate roof. There are two storeys and three bays. The central doorway has an oblong fanlight, and the windows are sashes. At the rear is a round-headed stair window with Gothic tracery, and in the right return is a quoin carved with the name of the house.	II
The Temple, Spensley House; 54.37915°N 2.07885°W	—	Early 19th century	A garden building in ironstone with a stone slate roof. There is a single storey and a square plan. The building contains a doorway, and has a moulded cornice.	II
Belle Isle, wall, gate piers and railings 54.37450°N 2.03545°W	—	Early 19th century	A house and a cottage under one roof, in sandstone, with a stone slate roof, a shaped kneeler on the right, and two storeys. The house has three bays. In the centre is a porch, and a doorway with plinths, an entablature, a frieze with the house name painted, and on the cornice is a re-set dated and initialled keystone. To the left of the doorway is a canted bay window, and the other windows are sashes. The cottage to the right has one bay, a doorway, a fixed window and a fire window on the ground floor, and a sash above. In front of the house is a stone coped garden wall and cast iron railings. The gate piers have obelisks, and there are more obelisks at intervals on the wall.	II
Ivy Cottages; 54.37702°N 2.02736°W	—	Early 19th century	Three, later two, cottages in stone with a stone slate roof, stone copings and shaped kneelers, and two storeys, The earlier cottage on the right has two bays, and a central doorway with Tuscan columns on bases, with capitals decorated with acanthus leaves, a plain entablature, a cornice and a pediment, and a door with a radial fanlight. At the rear is a round-headed sash window by imposts and a keystone. The cottage on the left is dated 1830, and it has three bays and two doorways, one with an initialled lintel. There is one casement window in the left cottage, and the other windows in both cottages are sashes.	II
Moorland Cottage, cart shed and stable 54.38225°N 2.03213°W	—	Early 19th century	The buildings are under one roof, and are in stone, with a stone slate roof and stone coping on the left. There are two storeys, and the house has three bays, and a double depth plan. On the front is a decorative porch and a doorway, the ground floor windows are casements and on the upper floor they are sashes. The stable and cart shed are on the left, and contain a segmental-arched cart entrance with a hood mould, a door, a vent and a window.	II
Old Post Office; 54.37910°N 2.02533°W	—	Early 19th century	The house is in sandstone, with rusticated quoins, paired gutter brackets, and a stone slate roof with kneelers and stone coping. In the centre is a doorway with a plain surround, a frieze and a cornice, and the windows are sashes.	II
School House and cottage 54.37941°N 2.07474°W	—	Early 19th century	The house was once a schoolmaster's house, and is in stone, and has a stone slate roof with shaped kneelers and stone coping. There are two storeys and two bays. In the centre is a round-arched doorway with quoined jambs, voussoirs and a keystone, and the windows are sashes. The cottage on the left dates from the 17th century, and has two storeys. It contains a doorway on the right with a chamfered surround, and in each floor is a two-light mullioned window.	II
Gunnerside New Bridge; 54.37571°N 2.07871°W		Early 1830s	The bridge carries the B6270 road over the River Swale. It is in stone, and consists of two arches, semicircular to the south and segmental to the north. It has voussoirs, a central cutwater, and a string course below the parapet that has rock-faced coping.	II
Brown Hill Top; 54.37685°N 2.02955°W		1836	A range of houses, cottages and outbuildings in stone, with a stone slate roof, a shaped kneeler on the left, and two storeys. On the left is a protruding stable and outhouse. On the front is a porch and various doorways, one with a lintel containing an initialled and dated panel. Most of the windows are casements, some with roundels on the lintel.	II
Holy Trinity Church; 54.38138°N 2.02238°W		1840	The church is in stone with a stone slate roof, and consists of a nave, a south porch, and a chancel. On the west gable is a double bellcote with corrugated copings and a floriated finial. The windows contain Y-tracery.	II
Gunnarsgill Hall; 54.38080°N 2.07697°W		1845	A school and a school house, later used for other purposes, in sandstone with a Welsh slate roof. There is an H-shaped plan, with a central range of two storeys and two bays, a right cross-wing, the former schoolroom, with one storey, and a two-storey left cross-wing. In the centre range is a doorway and two flat-headed windows. The right wing contains a porch and a doorway with a trefoil head, above is a three-light window, the lights with trefoil heads, and a single light in the gable.	II
Methodist Chapel; 54.37868°N 2.07751°W		1866	The chapel is in stone on a plinth, with rusticated quoins, sill bands, and a band forming a pediment, the tympanum containing an inscribed and dated plaque and a circular opening above. The roof is in stone slate with stone copings, and on the front gable is a ball with obelisk finial on a pedestal. There are two storeys and fronts of three bays. The central doorway has a round-arched head, imposts, voussoirs and a keystone. The windows are also round-headed with imposts and keystones, those above the doorway paired.	II
Wall, railings, gates and gate piers, Methodist Chapel; 54.37874°N 2.07708°W		Late 19th century	At the entrance to the churchyard are double gates and a wicket gate in wrought iron. The main gates are flanked by stone gate piers, each on a plinth, with a cornice and capping. Outside these are low stone walls with saddleback coping and cast iron railings.	II
Telephone kiosk opposite the Old Post Office; 54.37931°N 2.02548°W		1935	The K6 type telephone kiosk was designed by Giles Gilbert Scott. Constructed in cast iron with a square plan and a dome, it has three unperforated crowns in the top panels.	II
Telephone kiosk behind The Kings Head Public House; 54.37931°N 2.07632°W		1935	The K6 type telephone kiosk was designed by Giles Gilbert Scott. Constructed in cast iron with a square plan and a dome, it has three unperforated crowns in the top panels.	II
Farm buildings southwest of Park Hall; 54.38548°N 1.99012°W	—	Undated	The stables, byres and barn are in stone with a stone slate roof. There are two ranges at right angles, with two storeys. The openings include doorways and windows, and in the right return gable is a pigeon-cote.	II
