= Kearton (disambiguation) =

Kearton is a hamlet in the Yorkshire Dales, North Yorkshire, England.

Notable people with the surname Kearton include:

- Ada Cherry Kearton (1877–1966), South African soprano, spouse of Cherry Kearton
- Frank Kearton, Baron Kearton (1911–1992), British scientist and industrialist
- Jason Kearton (born 1969), Australian association football goalkeeper
- Richard and Cherry Kearton (1862–1928), late 19th/early 20th-century wildlife photographers and naturalists

First name

- Kearton Coates (1820–1893), English-born member of the Wisconsin State Assembly
