= Listed buildings in Skipton-on-Swale =

Skipton-on-Swale is a civil parish in the county of North Yorkshire, England. It contains four listed buildings that are recorded in the National Heritage List for England. All the listed buildings are designated at Grade II, the lowest of the three grades, which is applied to "buildings of national importance and special interest". The parish contains the village of Skipton-on-Swale and the surrounding area, and the listed buildings consist of a bridge, a church and two houses.

== Buildings ==
Name and location	Photograph	Date	Notes
Swale Bridge; 54.21262°N 1.44358°W		1781	The bridge, which carries the A61 road over the River Swale was designed by John Carr. It is in stone, and consists of six segmental arches with voussoirs. The central arch is flanked by semicircular cutwaters rising to form pedestrian retreats. The bridge has a band, plain parapets with chamfered copings, and square end piers.
Skipton Hall; 54.21206°N 1.43984°W		Early 19th century	The house is in red brick, with an eaves band, and a stone slate roof with stone coping. There are three storeys and three bays, and a recessed two-bay wing on the right. The central doorway has Doric half-columns, a fanlight with radial glazing, a frieze and a pediment. It is flanked by canted bay windows, each with a modillion frieze, a cornice and a lead hipped roof. The windows on the middle floor and on the wing are sashes, and on the top floor they are casements.
Skipton House; 54.21276°N 1.44178°W		c. 1830	The house is in red brick with a Welsh hipped slate roof. There are two storeys and three bays. The central doorway has Doric pilasters, a fanlight, a frieze and a cornice. The windows are sashes with stuccoed wedge lintels.
St John's Church; 54.21301°N 1.43807°W		1848	The church is in stone with a Welsh slate roof. It consists of a three-bay nave with a south porch, and a single-bay chancel with a north vestry. On the west gable is a gabled bellcote with a four-centred arched opening. The porch contains a four-centred arch, and a gable with kneelers and stone coping. The windows have two lights, flat heads, chamfered mullions, lights with cusped heads, and hood moulds.
