= Melbecks =

Civil parish in North Yorkshire, England

Coordinates: 54.395°N 2.070°W

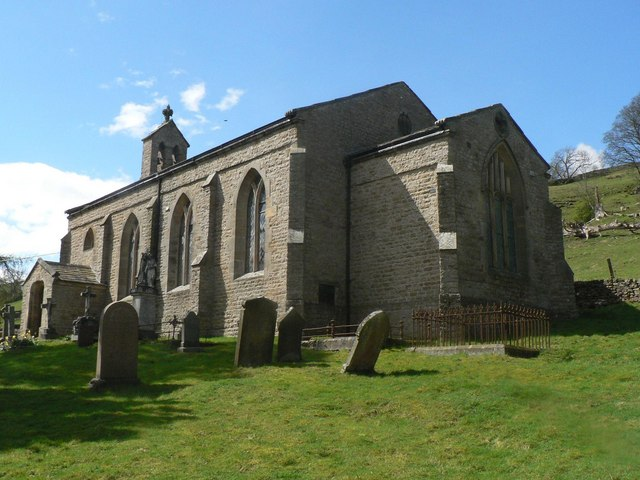
An image of Melbecks

Melbecks is a civil parish in Swaledale, North Yorkshire, England.

== History ==
It is located in upper Swaledale and covers the settlements of Gunnerside, Low Row, Feetham and Kearton. Melbecks is first recorded in 1676 under the Grinton Parish register, and its name derives from the Old Norse melr and bekkr, and means sand-bank streams. There is no settlement called Melbecks, but the upland to the north of Gunnerside is known as Melbecks Moor.

Historically, Melbecks was a township in the wapentake of Gilling West and in the Rural District of Reeth. From 1974 to 2023 it was part of the district of Richmondshire, it is now administered by the unitary North Yorkshire Council. Melbecks was made into its own Ecclesiastical Parish in 1838, and the church for the Melbecks parish, dedicated to the Holy Trinity, is at Feetham on the north side of the road through the hamlet. Both the Ecclesiastical Parish and the civil parish were separated from Grinton in 1838, and 1866 respectively.

The parish council conducts meetings alternately between the villages of Gunnerside and Low Row. It is represented at Westminster as part of the Richmond & Northallerton Constituency.

== Population ==
Population of Melbecks 1801–2015
1801	1811	1821	1831	1841	1851	1861	1871	1881	1891	1901	1911	1921	1931	1951	1961	1971	2001	2011	2015
1,274	1,586	1,726	1,455	1,633	1,661	1,622	1,437	1,165	600	497	411	415	402	388	345	299	285	273	280 (Note: Estimated population.)

The decrease in population of 75% between 1871 and 1891 was down to the collapse of the lead mining industry, which in the parish of Melbecks, was centred around Barney Beck and the moorland to the north of Gunnerside and Low Row. Likewise, a surge in population numbers was experienced in the parish before 1821 due to an influx of miners.

== See also ==
- Listed buildings in Melbecks
