= Kisdon Force =

Waterfall in North Yorkshire, England

Coordinates: 54.4041°N 2.1575°W

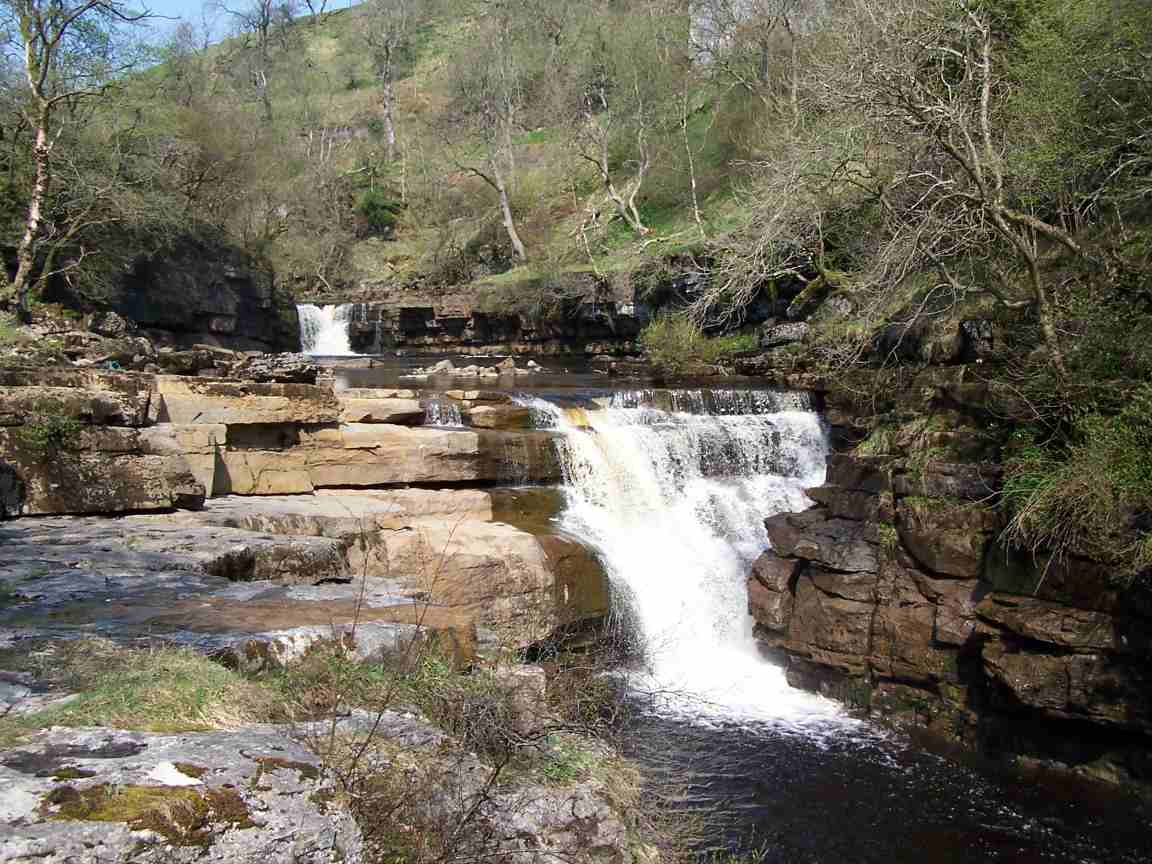
Kisdon Force

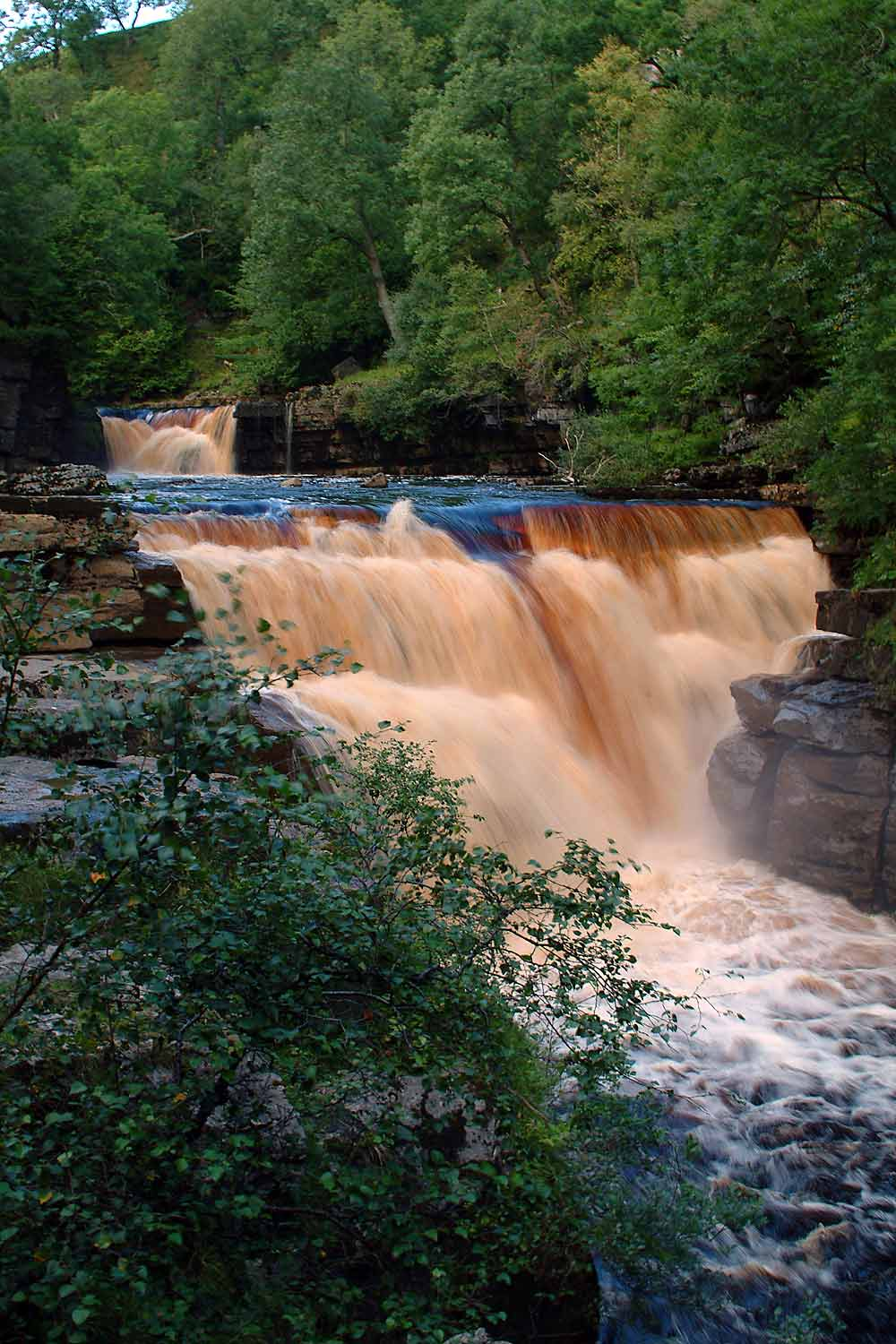
Kisdon Force in August 2006 after a night of rain

Kisdon Force is a series of waterfalls on the River Swale in Swaledale, England. The falls are situated within the Yorkshire Dales National Park in the county of North Yorkshire, 500 metres downstream from the small hamlet of Keld at grid reference NY898010.

Kisdon Force is one of several waterfalls on the Swale in the Keld area: the others are East Gill Force, Catrake Force and Wain Wath Force. All occur where the river cuts a gorge through the Carboniferous Limestone between the hills of Kisdon and Rogan's Seat. The falls in this area are termed "forces" after the Norse word fors or foss, which means "waterfall". Both upper and lower Kisdon Force can be negotiated by canoeists, although a high degree of skill and experience is needed. The upper falls are rated Grade IV whilst the lower falls are rated more difficult at Grade V.

The falls drop 10 metres (33 ft) over two cascades and are surrounded by Kisdon Force Woods, a Site of Special Scientific Interest covering an area of 38 hectares, which consists of mixed broad-leaved woodland with ash, wych elm and rowan dominating. In the spring, primroses grow profusely in the area. The falls can be easily visited by a riverside path from Keld. However, care should be taken since the stones around the falls are often wet and slippery. Visitor numbers to the falls are swollen by walkers along the Pennine Way, a long-distance footpath that passes the falls.

== See also ==
- List of waterfalls of England
