= Skipton-on-Swale =

Village and civil parish in North Yorkshire, England

Coordinates: 54°12′45″N 1°26′25″W

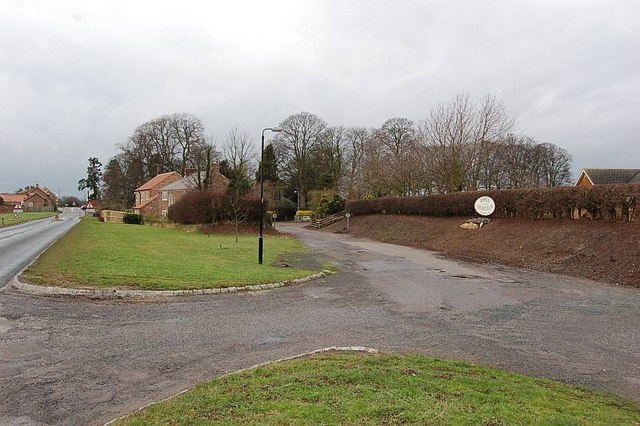
- Looking West at Skipton on Swale

- Location within North Yorkshire
- OS grid reference: SE364798
- Civil parish: Skipton-on-Swale
- Unitary authority: North Yorkshire
- Ceremonial county: North Yorkshire
- Region: Yorkshire and the Humber
- Country: England
- Sovereign state: United Kingdom
- Post town: THIRSK
- Postcode district: YO7
- Police: North Yorkshire
- Fire: North Yorkshire
- Ambulance: Yorkshire
- UK Parliament: Thirsk and Malton

Skipton-on-Swale is a village and civil parish in the county of North Yorkshire, England. The population at the 2011 Census was less than 100. Details are included in the civil parish of Catton, North Yorkshire. It lies on the A61 road, about 4 miles west of Thirsk on the east bank of the River Swale.

== History ==
The village is mentioned in the Domesday Book as Schipetune in the Yarlestre hundred under the manor of Topeclive, (Topcliffe). At the time of the Norman invasion, the manor was owned by Bernwulf and afterwards by William of Percy. In 1086 there were 35 villagers. The overlordship remained with and followed that of Topcliffe, but there were grants as mesne lord to various families over the centuries. For example, in 1284, Baldwin, son of John de Skipton owned land. In the 14th century, John Minniott of nearby Carlton bought land in the village. From 1600, one of the main land owners were the Clough family who were recorded as still in possession in 1710. After then, manorial rights seem to cease.

The name is derived from the Anglian word Scēp, meaning Sheep and the Old English word tun for settlement/farm, therefore literally Sheep farm.

The bridge that crosses the River Swale is a Grade II Listed building designed by John Carr and built in 1781.

To the north of the village is an abandoned airfield which was used by four squadrons from the Royal Canadian Air Force and one Polish Bomber Squadron between 1942 and 1947.

== Governance ==
The village is within the Thirsk and Malton UK Parliament constituency. From 1974 to 2023 it was part of the Hambleton District, it is now administered by the unitary North Yorkshire Council.

== Geography ==
The nearest settlements are Howe 0.5 miles (0.8 km) to the north west, Carlton Miniott 1.7 miles (2.7 km) to the north east, Baldersby 1 mile (1.6 km) to the south west and Catton 1.1 miles (1.8 km) to the south. It is located on the east bank of the River Swale and on the A61 road.

In 1881, the UK Census recorded the population as 145.

== Religion ==
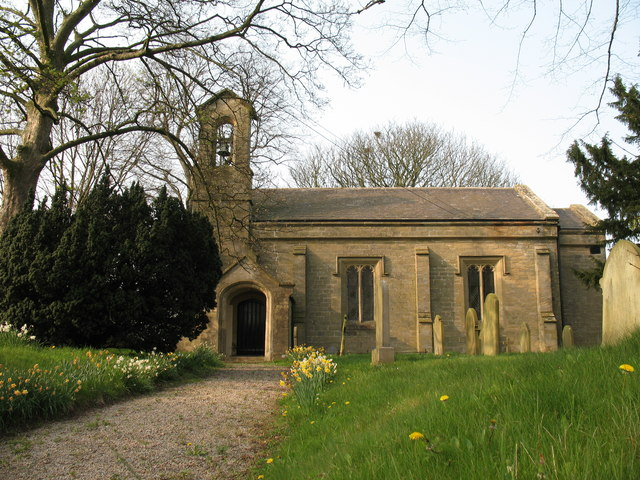
Church of St John the Evangelist, Skipton on Swale

St John's Church, Skipton-on-Swale was built in 1848 and is a Grade II Listed building. The Wesleyans built a chapel in the village in 1810 that had a school attached in 1882, both now disused.

== See also ==
- Listed buildings in Skipton-on-Swale
