= Paradise, Low Row =

Building in Low Row, North Yorkshire, England

Coordinates: 54°22′35″N 2°01′44″W

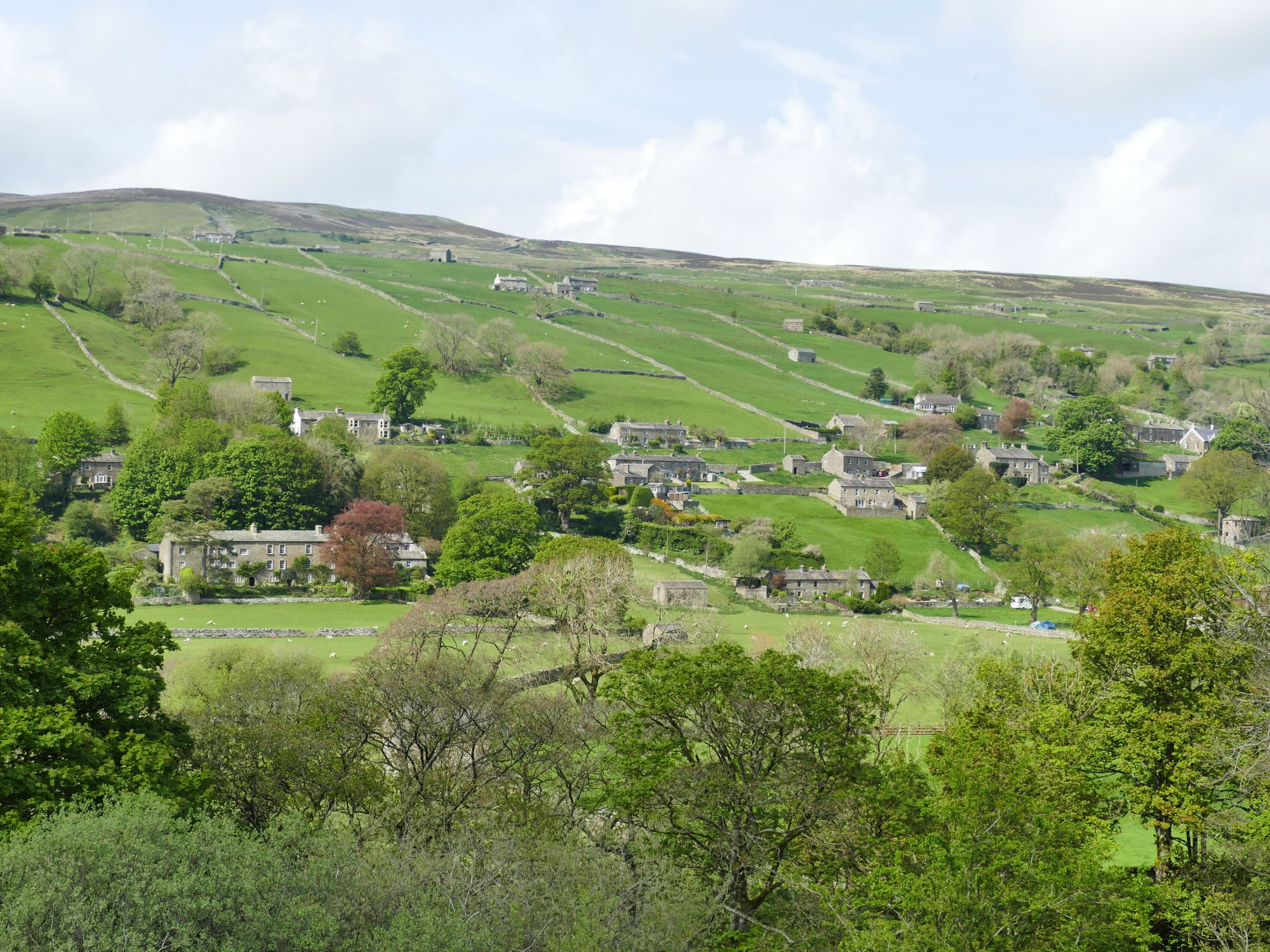
The building (front left), in Low Row

Paradise is a historic building in Low Row, a village in North Yorkshire, in England.

In the late mediaeval period, land at Paradise was owned by Mount Grace Priory. The current building was constructed in 1653, as a house and knitting factory. It was altered in the 18th century, the work including the replacement of the roof and some of the windows. The building was grade II* listed in 1986.

The house is built of stone on a boulder plinth, with a stone slate roof, stone copings and shaped kneelers, and three storeys. The house has three bays, and a central doorway with a quoined surround, and a lintel with inscribed and dated recessed panels. The manufactory to the left has two doorways, one with a chamfered surround. In both parts there is a mix of windows, some are mullioned, and others include casements and sashes, some horizontally-sliding. At the rear is an outshut with two cart sheds containing segmental arches, voussoirs and keystones. Inside, the outshut contains stone stairs.

The stable block, built in 1791, is grade II listed. It is built of stone, and has a stone slate roof with shaped kneelers and stone copings, and two storeys. On the ground floor is a doorway with initials and the date. External stone steps lead up to an upper floor doorway with a plinth.

== See also ==
- Grade II* listed buildings in North Yorkshire (district)
- Listed buildings in Melbecks
