= East Gill Force =

Waterfall in North Yorkshire, England

Coordinates: 54.40615°N 2.16172°W

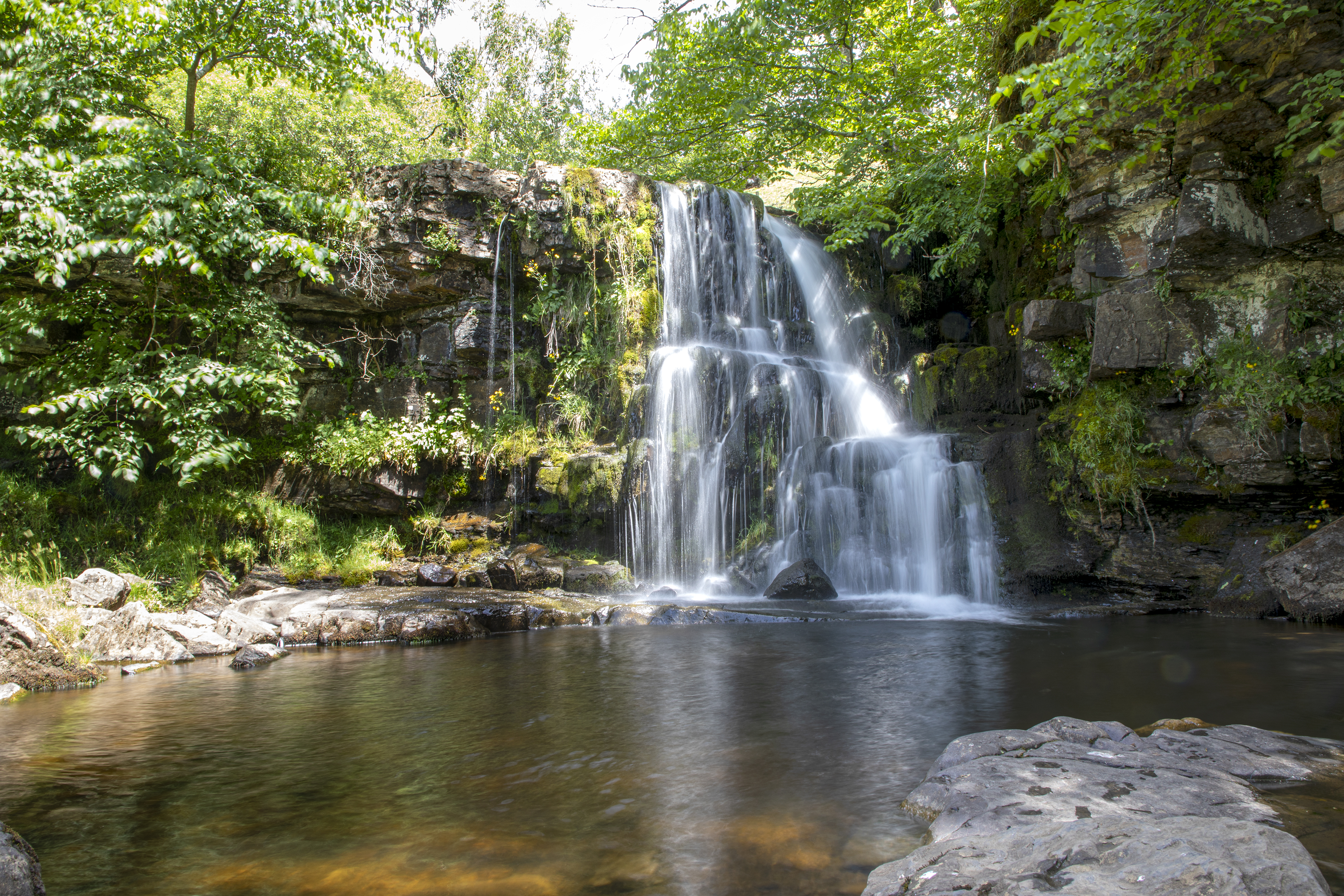
East Gill Force upper falls in Swaledale, North Yorkshire

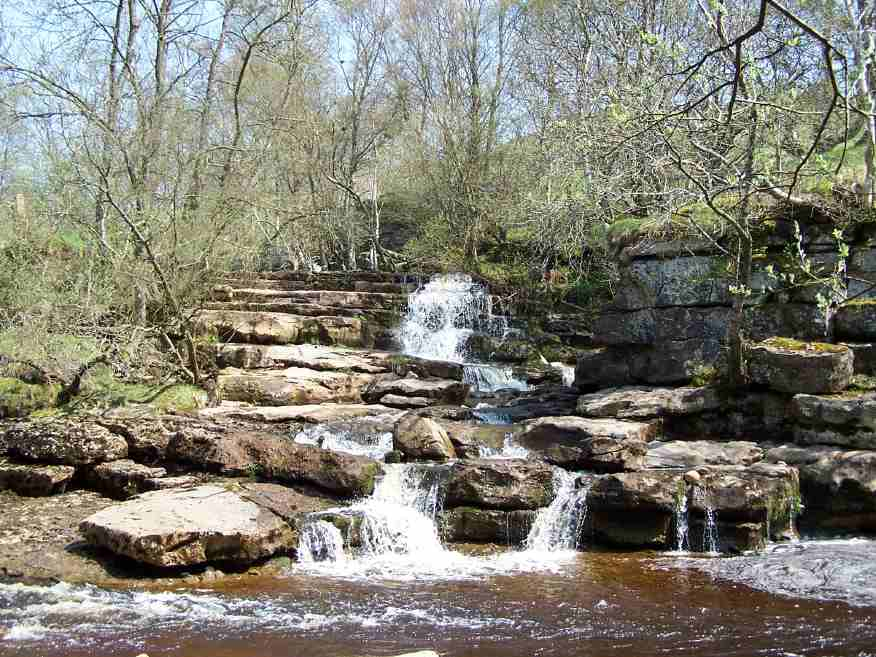
The lower part of East Gill Force as the Gill joins the River Swale

East Gill Force is a waterfall in Swaledale, 330 yards (300 m) east of the hamlet of Keld, in the Yorkshire Dales National Park, North Yorkshire, England. The falls are on East Gill at grid reference NY896012, just before its confluence with the River Swale at the point where the Pennine Way and the Coast to Coast Walk intersect. The falls are a popular spot for visitors, not just long-distance walkers but also families and picnickers because of the proximity of the road. East Gill Force has two main torrents: the upper falls have a 15-foot (4.5 m) drop whilst the lower section is a series of stepped cascades that fall 9.8 feet (3 m) as East Gill enters the River Swale.

East Gill Force is one of four waterfalls in the Keld area, the others being Kisdon Force, Catrake Force and Wain Wath Force that occur where the river cuts a gorge through the carboniferous limestone between the hills of Kisdon and Rogan's Seat. The falls in this area are called "forces" after the Norse word foss, meaning waterfall. The falls are surrounded by deciduous broadleaved woodland.

East Gill Force is sometimes mistaken for the nearby Catrake Force (on the River Swale proper), perhaps because the latter is marked on the Ordnance Survey map but is less prominent and less easily accessible.

== See also ==
- List of waterfalls in the United Kingdom
