= King's Head, Gunnerside =

Pub in North Yorkshire, England

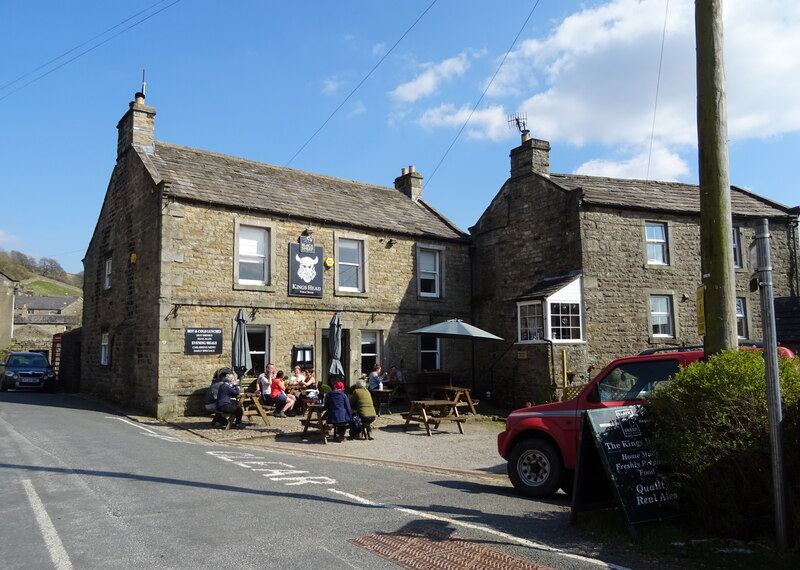
The pub, in 2021

The King's Head is a pub in Gunnerside, a village in North Yorkshire, in England.

The pub was built in 1760. It was grade II listed in 1986. It was restored and reroofed in 2014, then in 2019, it was acquired by the local community.

The pub is built of stone, with quoins, sill bands, a floor band, and a stone slate roof with shaped kneelers and stone coping. It has two storeys, three bays and a rear outshut. The doorway is in the centre, the windows are sashes, and all the openings have projecting stone surrounds.

== See also ==
- Listed buildings in Melbecks
