= Wain Wath Force =

Waterfall in North Yorkshire, England

Coordinates: 54.40882°N 2.18176°W

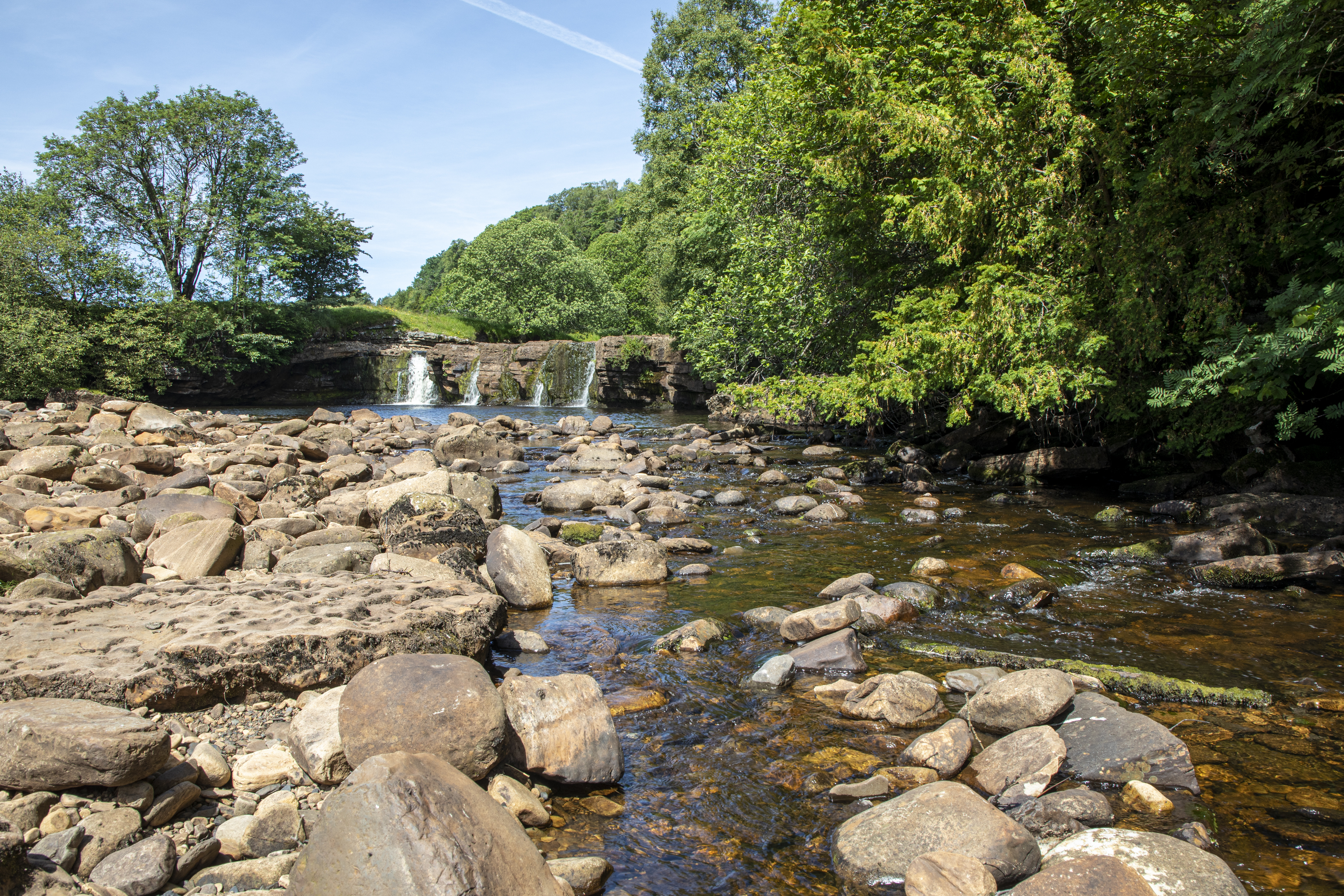
Wain Wath Force waterfall in North Yorkshire

Wain Wath Force is a waterfall on the River Swale in the Yorkshire Dales National Park, North Yorkshire, England. The falls are at grid reference NY883015, 0.6 miles (1 km) upstream from the hamlet of Keld which has three other waterfalls in its vicinity (Kisdon Force, East Gill Force, and Catrake Force). The names of waterfalls in the north of England often contain "force" after the Old Norse word foss, which means "waterfall".

Its name derives from the ford above the fall, wath being the Anglo-Saxon word for a ford. Wain may denote that it was passable for a cart or wain.

Wain Wath Force is not a substantial waterfall: it has a drop of only around 1.5 metres as the river flows beneath the limestone cliffs of Cotterby Scar. Despite its modest height it is popular with visitors; the Coast to Coast long-distance footpath passes the falls on the north bank of the River Swale while the main motor road up Upper Swaledale passes on the south bank.

== See also ==
- List of waterfalls in the United Kingdom
