= Catrake Force =

Waterfall in North Yorkshire, England

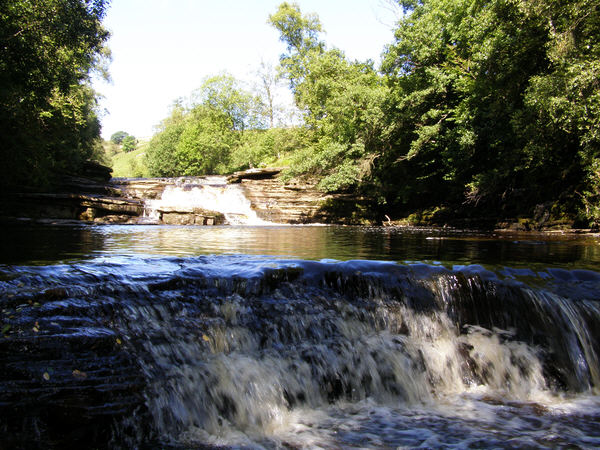
- Catrake Force
- Interactive map of Catrake Force
- Location: Swaledale, North Yorkshire, England
- Coordinates: 54°24′4″N 2°10′0″W
- Type: Step
- Total height: 10 m (33 ft)
- Number of drops: 4

Catrake Force is a waterfall on the River Swale in North Yorkshire, England. It is not visible from the road but is accessible via a campsite in Keld. It comprises a series of four steps, each its own small waterfall, and each with a very different character – the largest single drop being about 20 feet (6.1 m).

It lies just upstream of Keld, downstream from Wain Wath Force. The next waterfall downstream is Kisdon Force. Waterfalls in the north of England are often termed Forces after the Norse word Foss which means waterfall, whilst Catrake derives from the Latin cataracta (waterfall) via Middle English.

== East Gill Force ==
East Gill Force, a nearby waterfall on the tributary of East Gill just above its confluence with the Swale, is more obvious and accessible (being on both the Pennine Way and Coast to Coast Walk) and is often mistaken for Catrake Force.

== See also ==
- List of waterfalls
- List of waterfalls in England
