= The Punch Bowl, Low Row =

Listed pub in North Yorkshire, England

The Punch Bowl
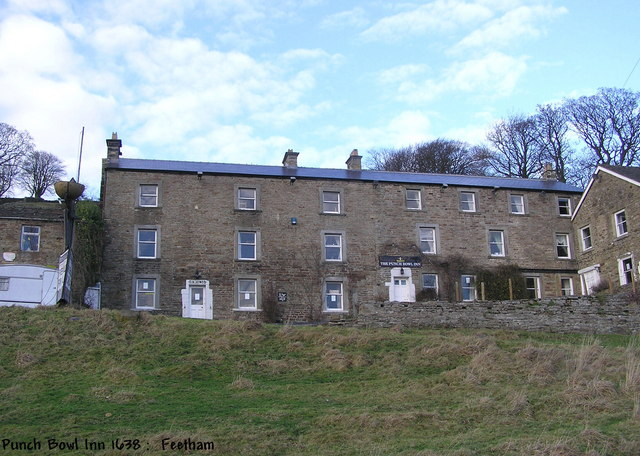
- The pub in 2006
- Interactive map of the The Punch Bowl area

General information
- Type: Public house
- Location: Low Row, North Yorkshire, England
- Coordinates: 54.12084°N 1.19563°W
- Years built: Mid-18th century (mostly; dated 1638)
- Renovated: Early 20th century (extended) c. 1929 (restored)

Design and construction
- Designations

Listed Building – Grade II
- Official name: Punch Bowl Hotel
- Designated: 21 April 1986
- Reference no.: 1301814

Website
- pbinn.co.uk

The Punch Bowl is a historic public house in Low Row, a village in North Yorkshire, England.

The pub is dated 1638, and may partly date from that period, but is mostly mid-18th-century. It is locally believed that it was the main stop on the "corpse road", where bodies were carried from upper Swaledale to the burial ground at Grinton, which ceased to be used after 1580, when ground was consecrated in Muker. The building was extended in the early 20th century. In 1929, it suffered a serious fire, destroying the roof and interior, but was soon restored. The building was Grade II listed in 1986.

The pub is built of stone with an artificial slate roof. It has three storeys and six bays. On the front are two doorways, the left with a quoined surround and a dated and initialled lintel. There is a blocked fire window with a moulded surround, and the other windows are sashes. On the right is a later projecting extension.

== See also ==
- Listed buildings in Melbecks
