= Gunnerside Gill =

Valley in North Yorkshire, England

Coordinates: 54°23′58″N 2°05′32″W

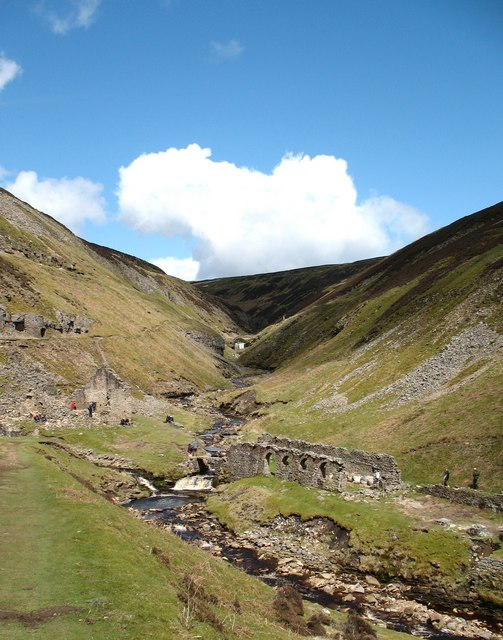
Upper reaches of the gill, showing the remains of Blakethwaite Smelt Mill.

Gunnerside Gill (or Ghyll) is a small valley in the Yorkshire Dales, England, which branches off Swaledale into moorland to the north of Gunnerside.

The site of intensive lead mining in the 18th and 19th centuries, the valley still contains much evidence of its industrial past. Streams were dammed, and the water released as a torrent to scour soil off the surface and reveal lead ore (galena) seams. The resultant scars are known as hushes (perhaps an onomatopoeia of the sound that the water made). Bunton, Friarfold, and Gorton hushes are on the east side of the valley, with the North Hush being on the opposite side. Large areas of the upper valley are covered in spoil heaps from the mining activity, and a number of buildings remain. Many of the buildings and mine structures are scheduled ancient monuments.

Waterfalls in Botcher Gill, a tributary of Gunnerside Beck, contain numerous fossils.

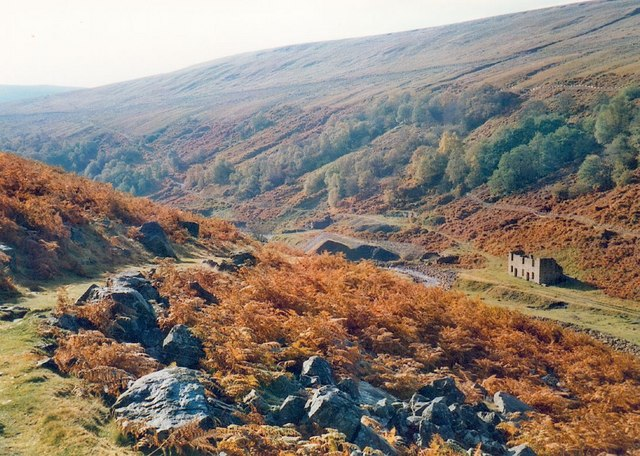
The Sir Francis Mine in the lower reaches of the gill. The building to the right is the remains of the mine offices.

The Sir Francis mine opened further down the valley in 1864 to exploit deeper seams, and was the first to use compressed air drills. It was abandoned in 1882 after failing to make decent returns.

The Coast to Coast Walk passes through the upper reaches of the valley.

As the valley descends southwards, the scenery changes from the industrial to a mixture of woodland and sheep pastures, before the beck joins the River Swale in the village of Gunnerside.
