= St John's Church, Skipton-on-Swale =

Church building in North Yorkshire, England

Coordinates: 54°12′47″N 1°26′17″W

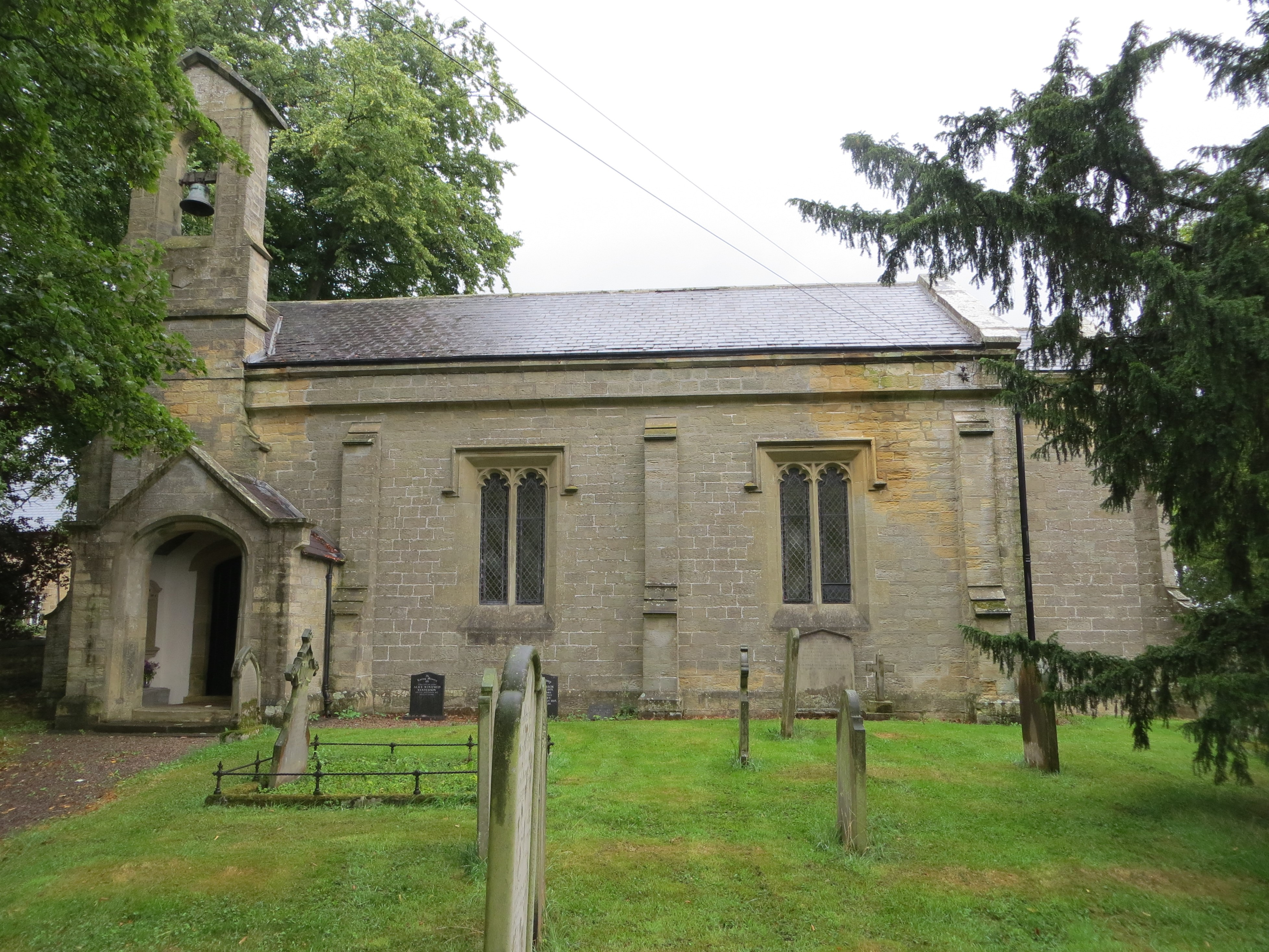
The church, in 2018

St John's Church is a closed church in Skipton-on-Swale, a village in North Yorkshire, in England.

Skipton was long in the parish of St Columba's Church, Topcliffe. A church was built in 1842, at a cost of £700. A vestry was added on the north side in the 20th century. The building was grade II listed in 1988. The church closed for worship in 2022.

The church is built of stone with a Welsh slate roof. It consists of a three-bay nave with a south porch, and a single-bay chancel with a north vestry. On the west gable is a gabled bellcote with a four-centred arched opening. The porch contains a four-centred arch, and a gable with kneelers and stone coping. The windows have two lights, flat heads, chamfered mullions, lights with cusped heads, and hood moulds.

== See also ==
- Listed buildings in Skipton-on-Swale
