= Gunnerside Methodist Church =

Chapel in North Yorkshire, England

Coordinates: 54.3787°N 2.0775°W

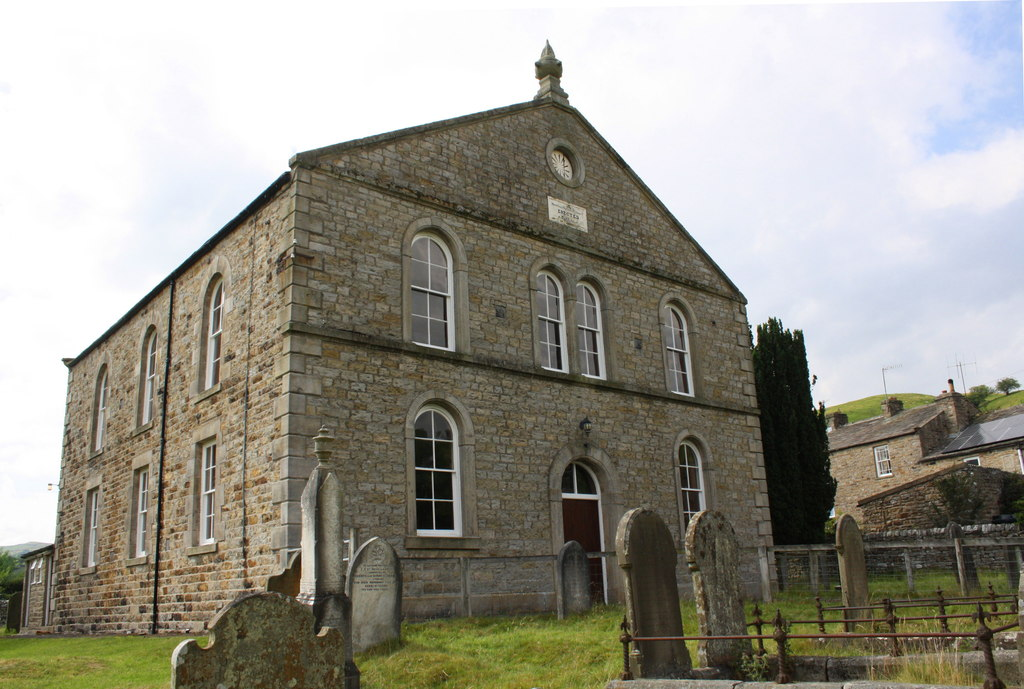
The building in 2018

Gunnerside Methodist Church is a historic building in Gunnerside, a village in North Yorkshire, in England and an active church within the North Yorkshire Dales Circuit of the Methodist Church.

The first Wesleyan Methodist Church in Gunnerside was built in 1789. It was rebuilt in 1866. Hall and Zaman describe it as the "most prominent structure" in the village, and its "critical physical marker", but that "unfortunately, its architecture offers no merit beyond the gable's rose window and the stone finial at its apex". On completion, it could seat a congregation of 700 worshippers. The building was grade II listed in 1986.

The chapel is built of stone on a plinth, with rusticated quoins, sill bands, and a band forming a pediment, the tympanum containing an plaque inscribed "WESLEYAN METHODIST CHAPEL ERECTED 1866" and a circular opening above. The roof is in stone slate with stone copings, and on the front gable is a ball with obelisk finial on a pedestal. There are two storeys and fronts of three bays. The central doorway has a round-arched head, imposts, voussoirs and a keystone. The windows are also round-headed with imposts and keystones, those above the doorway paired.

At the entrance to the churchyard are double gates and a wicket gate in wrought iron. The main gates are flanked by stone gate piers, each on a plinth, with a cornice and capping. Outside these are low stone walls with saddleback coping and cast iron railings. The wall, railings, gates and gate piers are contemporary with the church and are collectively grade II listed.

By 2016 the chapel was hosting fortnightly services with fewer than ten attendees. It was threatened with closure in 2015, but a friends' group was set up to fund running costs and repairs, and it survives as the last Methodist chapel in Swaledale.

== See also ==
- Listed buildings in Melbecks
