= Gunnerside =

Village in North Yorkshire, England

Coordinates: 54°22′45″N 2°04′36″W

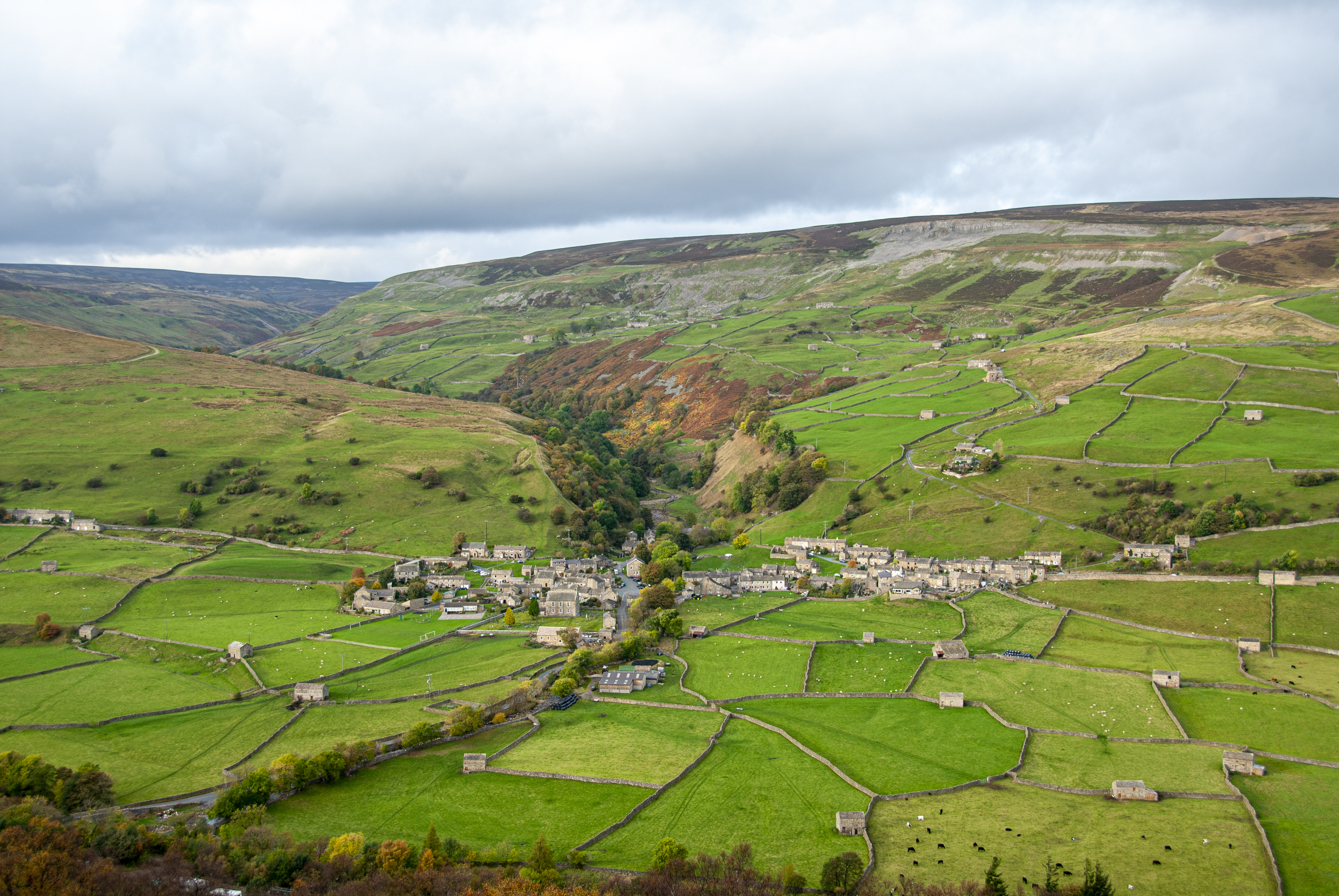
- Gunnerside from the south side of the valley

- Location within North Yorkshire
- OS grid reference: SD951982
  - London: 210 mi (340 km) SE
- Civil parish: Melbecks
- Unitary authority: North Yorkshire
- Ceremonial county: North Yorkshire
- Region: Yorkshire and the Humber
- Country: England
- Sovereign state: United Kingdom
- Post town: DARLINGTON
- Postcode district: DL11
- Dialling code: 01748
- Police: North Yorkshire
- Fire: North Yorkshire
- Ambulance: Yorkshire
- UK Parliament: Richmond and Northallerton

Gunnerside is a village in North Yorkshire, England. It is situated in Swaledale, on the B6270 road, 3 miles (5 km) east of Muker and 6 miles (10 km) west of Grinton. The village lies between the River Swale and its tributary, Gunnerside Beck, and is within the Yorkshire Dales National Park. From 1974 to 2023 it was part of the district of Richmondshire. It is now administered by the unitary North Yorkshire Council.

== History ==
The name of the village derives from an Old Norse personal name Gunnar and sætr meaning hill or pasture.

Gunnerside Ghyll (or Gunnerside Gill), a smaller valley running northwards, at right angles to the Swale valley (Swaledale), was the site of a major lead mining industry in Swaledale from the 17th century to the late 19th century. The beck that runs through the narrow valley, also called Gunnerside Gill, or Gunnerside Beck, rises between Rogan's Seat and Water Crag, and runs for 5 miles (8 km), emptying into the River Swale at the site of Gunnerside New Bridge. The bridge carries the B6270 over the River Swale south of the village; it was rebuilt several times during the 19th century due to flooding. The current structure dates from around 1892 and is Grade II listed.

== Local facilities ==
The Old Working Smithy & Museum was established in 1795.

Gunnerside is served by the Gunnerside Methodist Chapel, a part-time post office, a weekly market, a restaurant and some shops selling food items. The chapel was founded in 1789, but rebuilt in 1866. The structure is now Grade II listed. A private building to the north of the crossroads in the village was the site of a medieval corn mill, and in the early 20th century, a bus garage. At the foot of Gunnerside Ghyll is the King's Head, a public house.

The village primary school is one of two sites of the Reeth and Gunnerside Schools. At the last Ofsted inspection in 2023, the primary school was rated as "Good".

The area attracts many ramblers who use the foot tracks for exploring the area. Local employment centres on tourism, clockmaking, hill farming, wildlife management and construction, the latter concerned chiefly with the maintenance of traditional stone-built field walls, houses and field barns. The latter, also known as laithes, are typically referred to as "cow'uses" or cow houses in Swaledale.

== Notable people ==
- John Close, poet, was born in the village in 1816.
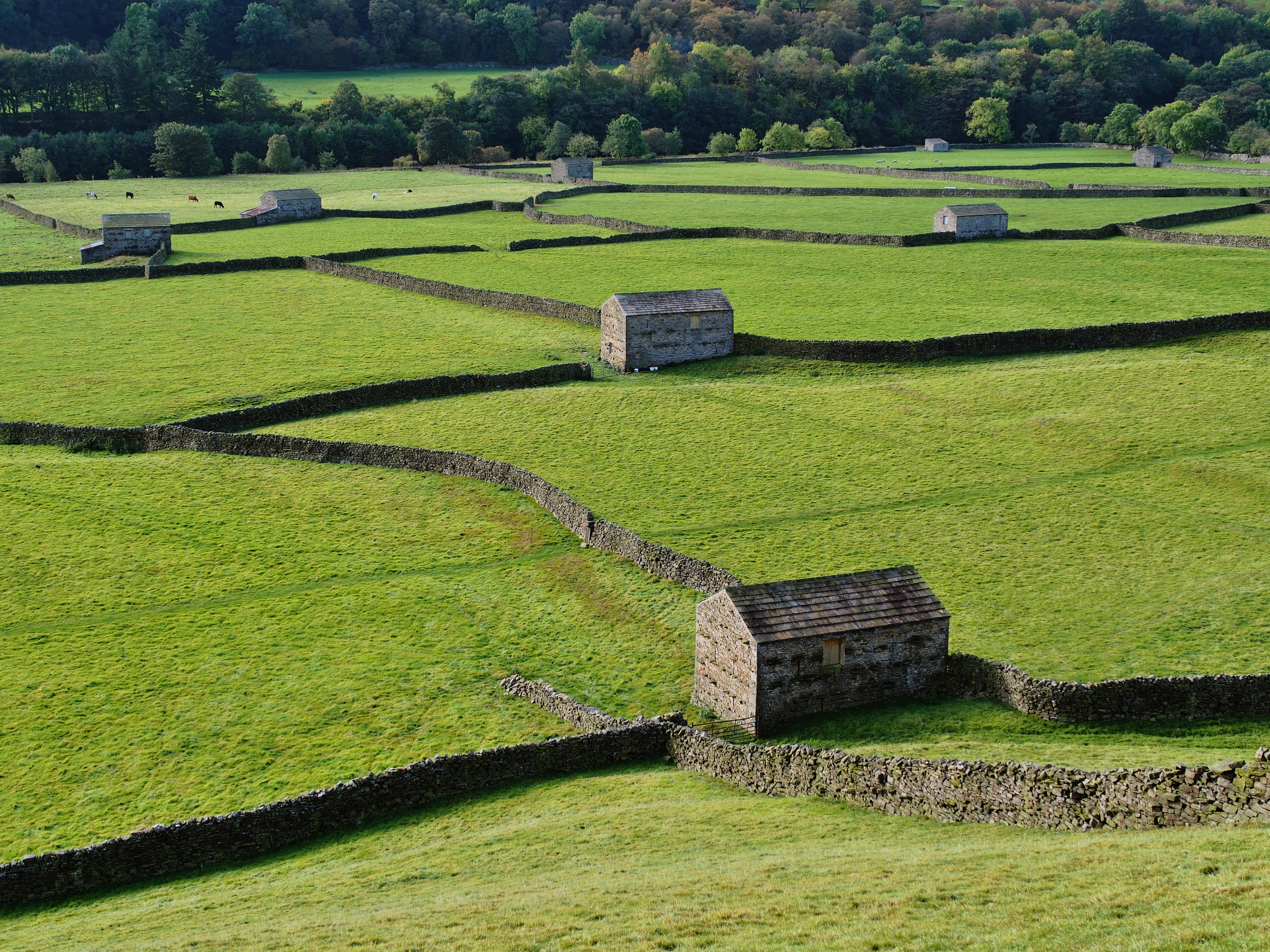
Stone barns in the meadows near Gunnerside New Bridge

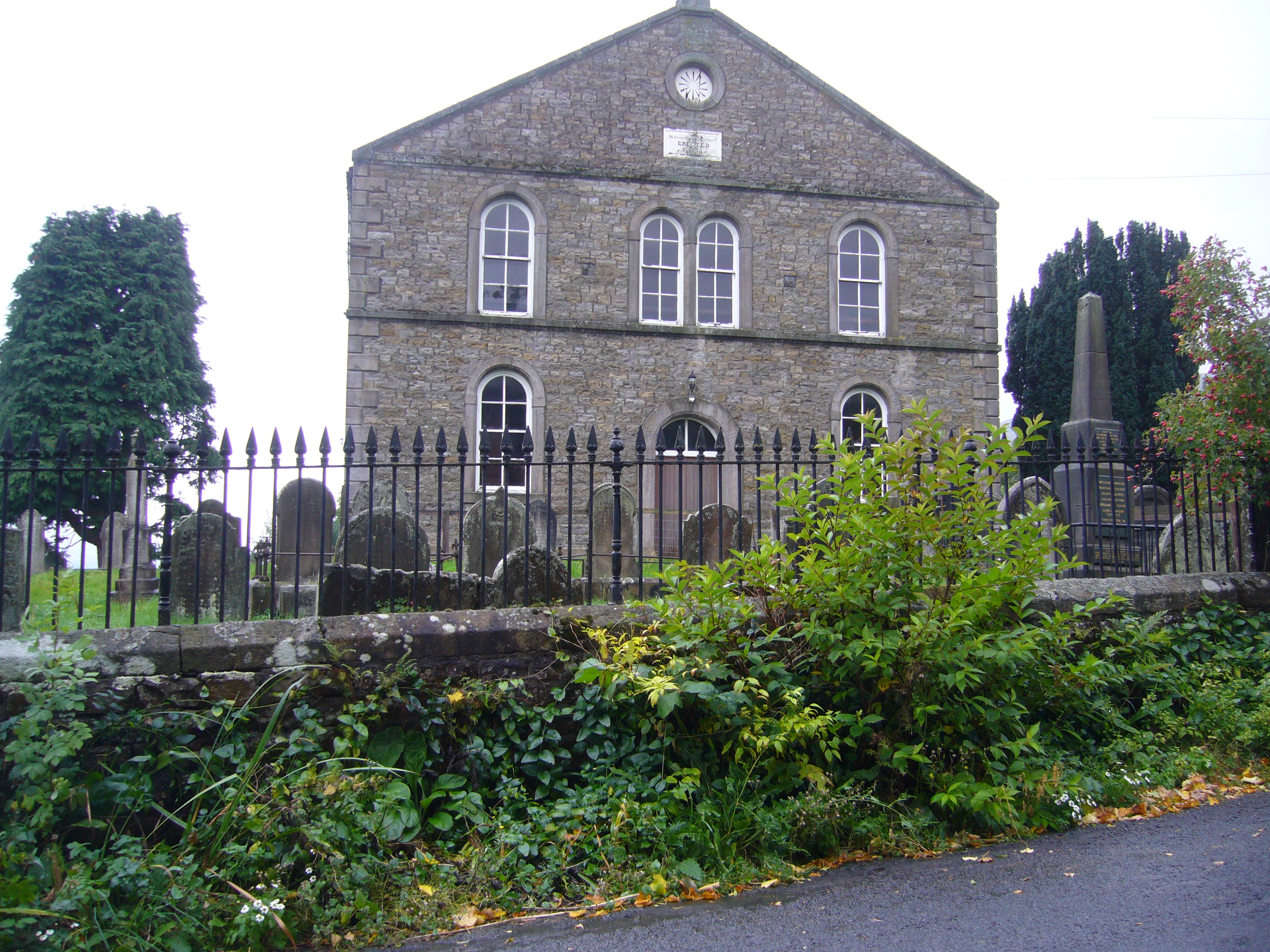
Methodist Chapel

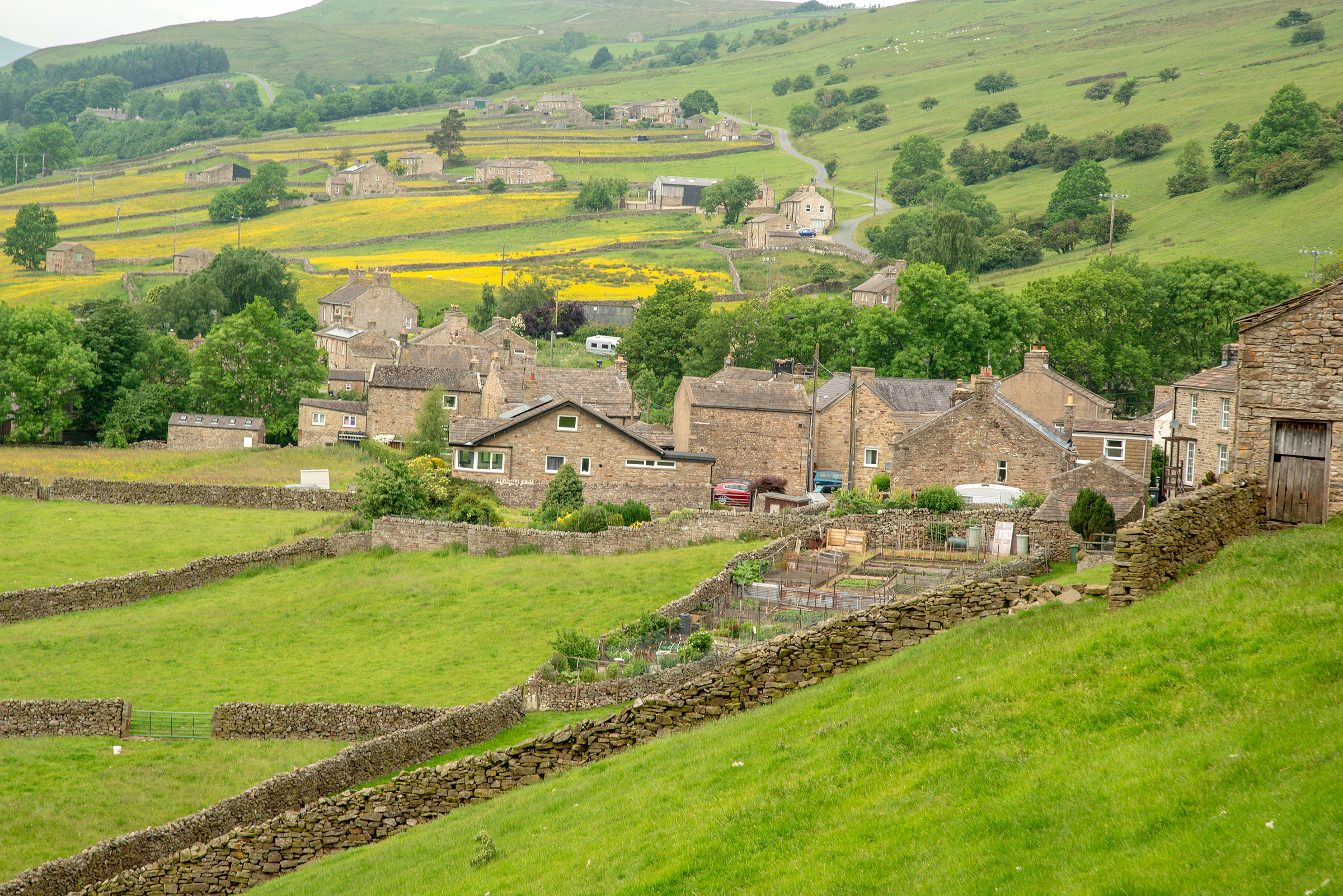
Approaching Gunnerside

== See also ==
- Listed buildings in Melbecks
- Operation Gunnerside, which may have acquired its name because the participants trained on a moor near to Gunnerside owned by Charles Hambro.
