= Fawdington =

Hamlet and civil parish in North Yorkshire, England

Coordinates: 54.14907°N 1.33099°W

- Location within North Yorkshire
- Population: 10 (NYCC 2015)
- OS grid reference: SE437727
- Civil parish: Fawdington
- Unitary authority: North Yorkshire
- Ceremonial county: North Yorkshire
- Region: Yorkshire and the Humber
- Country: England
- Sovereign state: United Kingdom
- Post town: YORK
- Postcode district: YO61
- Police: North Yorkshire
- Fire: North Yorkshire
- Ambulance: Yorkshire

Fawdington is a hamlet and civil parish in the county of North Yorkshire, England. It is on the River Swale and near the A1(M) motorway, 8 miles (13 km) south of Thirsk, and 5 miles (8 km) north-east of Boroughbridge. The population of the parish was estimated at 10 in 2015. The population remained at less than 100 at the 2011 Census. Details were included in the old civil parish of Brafferton, North Yorkshire.

From 1974 to 2023 it was part of the Hambleton District, it is now administered by the unitary North Yorkshire Council.

The name of the hamlet is generally agreed to derive from a mixture of Old English and Old Norse, with the suffix tūn meaning town. However the first part is in dispute; Ekwall states that it derives from the Old English Falding, meaning the place where animals were folded (brought into a fold), whereas the English Place-Name Society states that it is from Falda, a personal name.

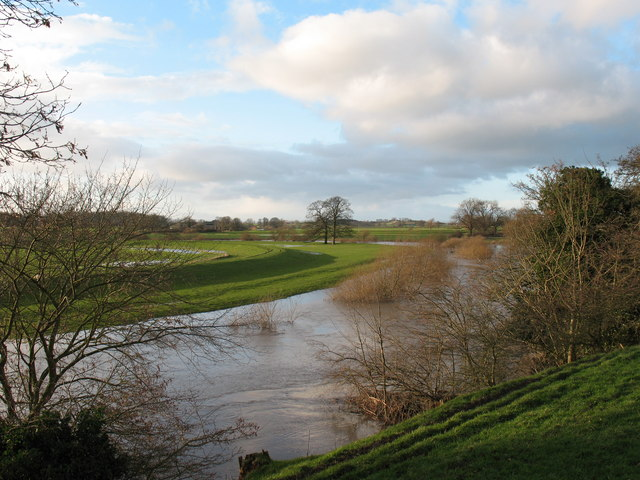
The River Swale at Fawdington
