= Catton, North Yorkshire =

Village and civil parish in North Yorkshire, England

Coordinates: 54.197°N 1.434°W

Catton
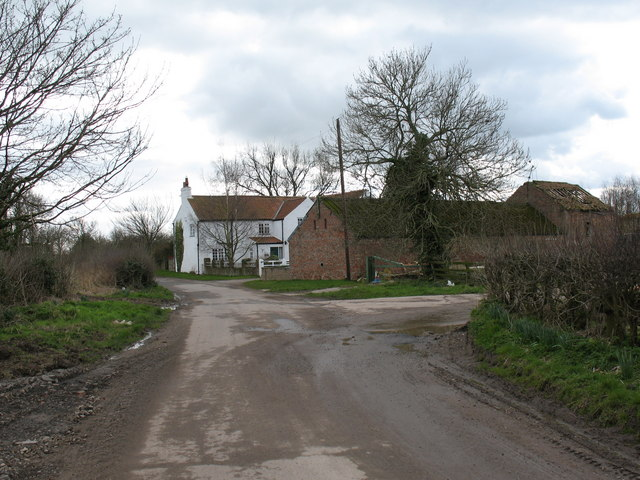
- Village Farm, Catton

- Location within North Yorkshire
- Population: 173 (Including Skipton-on-Swale. 2011 census)
- OS grid reference: SE369780
- Civil parish: Catton
- Unitary authority: North Yorkshire
- Ceremonial county: North Yorkshire
- Region: Yorkshire and the Humber
- Country: England
- Sovereign state: United Kingdom
- Post town: THIRSK
- Postcode district: YO7
- Dialling code: 01845
- Police: North Yorkshire
- Fire: North Yorkshire
- Ambulance: Yorkshire
- UK Parliament: Thirsk and Malton

Catton is a village and civil parish in North Yorkshire, England. It is situated between Thirsk and Ripon, on the River Swale.

From 1974 to 2023 it was part of the Hambleton District, it is now administered by the unitary North Yorkshire Council.
