= River Swale =

River in Yorkshire, England

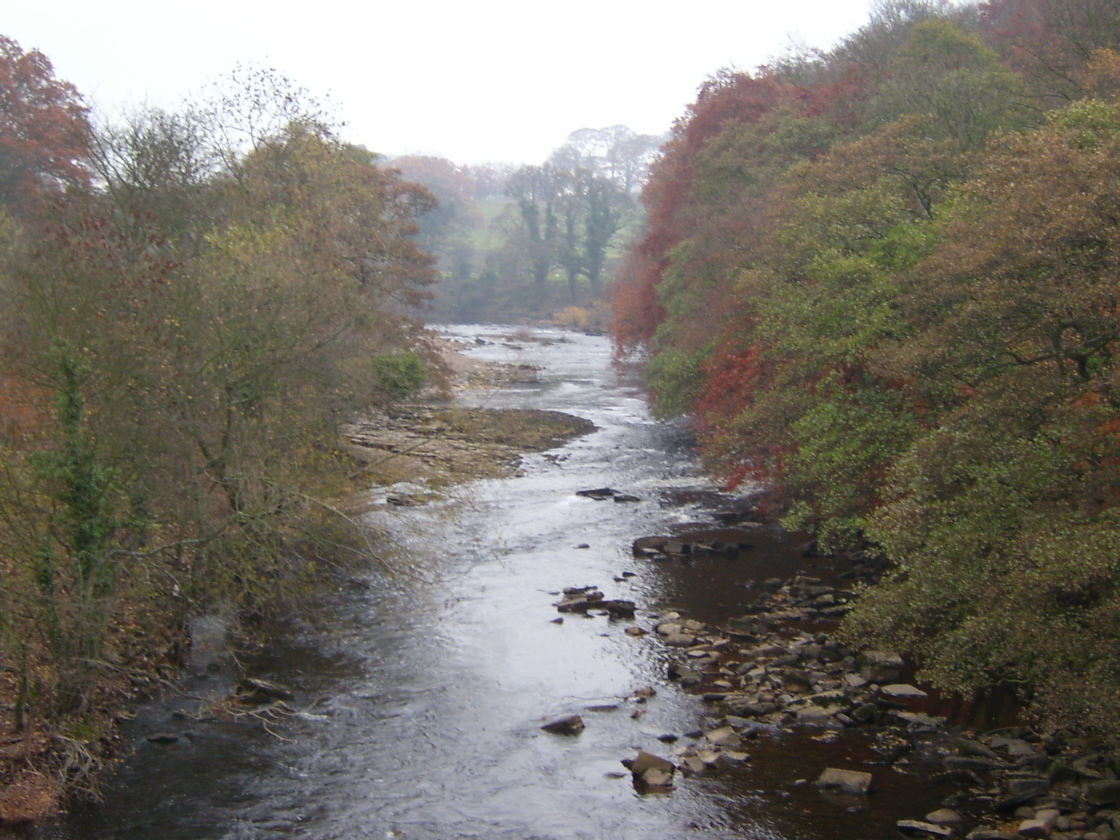
- The River Swale near Richmond

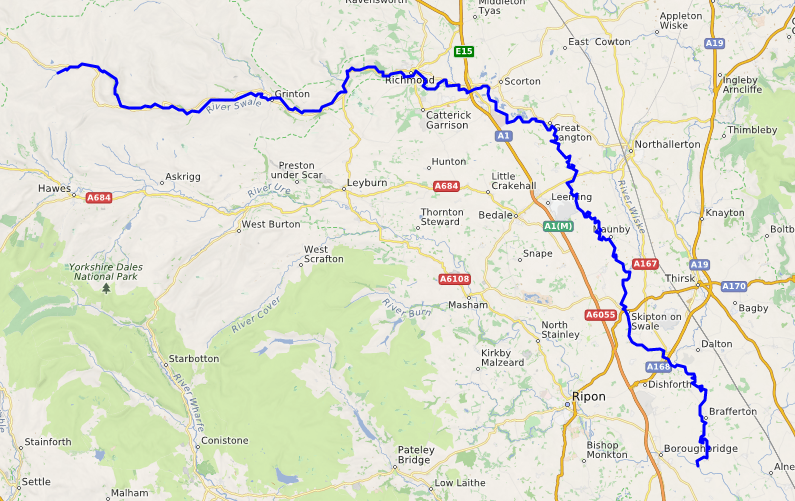

Location
- Country: England

Physical characteristics
- Source
  - location: Confluence of Birkdale Beck and Great Sleddale Beck.
  - coordinates: 54.403019°N 2.222681°W
  - elevation: 366 m (1,201 ft)
- Mouth
  - location: River Ure, near Myton-on-Swale, North Yorkshire
  - coordinates: 54.087853°N 1.343408°W
  - elevation: 11 m (36 ft)
- Length: 117.8 km (73.2 mi)

The River Swale in Yorkshire, England, is a major tributary of the River Ure, which becomes the River Ouse, that empties into the North Sea via the Humber Estuary. The river gives its name to Swaledale, the valley through which it flows.

The river and its valley are home to many types of flora and fauna typical to the Yorkshire Dales. Like similar rivers in the region, the river carves through several types of rock and has features typical of both river and glacial erosion. The River Swale has been a contributory factor in the settlements that have been recorded throughout its history. It has provided water to aid in the raising of crops and livestock, but also in the various mining activities that have occurred since Roman times and before.

The river is said to be the fastest flowing in England and its levels have been known to rise 10 feet (3 m) in 20 minutes. Annual rainfall figures average 1800 mm p.a. in the headwaters and 1300 mm p.a. in the lower waters over a drop of 148 m in 32 km.

== Course ==
The source of the Swale is at the confluence of Birkdale Beck and Great Sleddale Beck. The river flows north-north-east past lead mines on its northern bank and the end of Whitsundale and then eastwards towards the first of many waterfalls in the headwaters. After flowing over Wain Wath Force the river continues south-east over Hoggarts Leap and Catrake Force near Keld, before it reaches East Gill Force and Kisdon Force. Shortly after Swinner Gill joins the river it swings sharply south towards the village of Muker where Straw Beck joins and the river turns east again. The river flows past Gunnerside towards Feetham where it turns north-east for a short while before returning east past Healaugh, Reeth and Grinton. The river then swings gently south-east and east below Marrick before turning north-eastward and then north past Marske.

The Swale returns eastward near Hudswell before it flows past the main town of the valley, Richmond. It starts a series of long south-east meanders past Brompton-on-Swale and passes under the A1 at Catterick Bridge before turning south past Catterick. The river continues long south and south-east meanders past Thrintoft and Morton-on-Swale. As it starts to pursue a more constant southerly flow it is joined by the River Wiske before passing Skipton-on-Swale, Catton, Topcliffe and Asenby. It then flows past Helperby and Myton-on-Swale before joining the River Ure.

=== River levels ===
Monitoring station	Station elevation	Low water level	High water level	Record high level
Park Bridge	325 m (1,066 ft)	0.00 m (0 ft)	2.50 m (8.2 ft)	3.04 m (10.0 ft)
Grinton Bridge	178 m (584 ft)	0 m (0 ft)	1.5 m (4.9 ft)	2.51 m (8.2 ft)
Richmond Lownthwaite Bridge	114 m (374 ft)	0.00 m (0 ft)	2.0 m (6.6 ft)	4.19 m (13.7 ft)
Catterick Bridge	60 m (200 ft)	0.3 m (0.98 ft)	2.40 m (7.9 ft)	3.48 m (11.4 ft)
Morton-on-Swale	27 m (89 ft)	0.13 m (0.43 ft)	5.80 m (19.0 ft)	6.47 m (21.2 ft)
Crakehill	16 m (52 ft)	0.22 m (0.72 ft)	3 m (9.8 ft)	5.45 m (17.9 ft)
Myton-on-Swale	12 m (39 ft)	0.44 m (1.4 ft)	3.44 m (11.3 ft)	6.02 m (19.8 ft)

- Low and High Water Levels are an average figure.

== Natural history ==
The River Swale and its valley support a range of habitats including broadleaved, mixed and conifer woodland as well as hay meadows and grasslands. Limestone scar, bracken, scrub and heather moorland can also be found. Amongst the species of tree that can be found are ash, birch, rowan and bird cherry along with shrubs such as hawthorn, hazel and holly. There are smaller populations of yew and sycamore. Pine, larch and spruce occur mostly in plantations with alder and willow common along the river banks. The many hay meadows are filled with buttercup species and wood cranesbill.

== Geology ==
There are three distinct geological areas in Upper and Mid Swaledale. The upper reaches of the river flow over Carboniferous, Permian and Triassic rock, all of which are atop a layer of Lower Paleozoic beds. These rocks are rich in minerals and metalliferous sulfide ores such as galena, sphalerite, chalcopyrite and bravoite. There are also deposits of fluorite, barite, witherite, calcite, dolomite and barytocalcite.

Along the valley sides can be seen the typical Dales geology of Yoredale beds, alternating strata of limestone and gritstone. Small seams of coal, particularly around Tan Hill, have been found and worked. During the last Ice Age, the glacier that dominated the valley was responsible for broadening it and altering the course of the river around Keld and Round Howe. It was also responsible for cutting the Kisdon gorge. Retreat moraines lower in the river valley can be seen around Gunnerside and Grinton Bridge.

== History ==
The earliest evidence of occupation in the river valley can be dated to the Mesolithic and Neolithic Ages with the discovery of flint tools and arrowheads. Around Harkerside are some small stone circles that date to the Bronze Age and some Iron Age defensive earthworks. Evidence of lead mining has been traced back to Roman times with finds at the Hurst mine. This industry seemed to decline until after the Norse (Danish) invasions of the area. During the major ecclesiastical building of the 12th and 13th centuries, lead became a valuable commodity and mining once again increased in the valley. Evidence of the lead mining can still be seen from the remains of the 18th-century practice of 'hushing' that involved creating turf dams across gills that were then released to wash away topsoil to expose the ore veins.

It was part of the Votadini Celtic kingdom of Catraeth, but in the late 6th century the river valley was invaded by Angles who took the settlement at Catraeth (now Catterick). Warriors from the Celtic Gododdin kingdom to the north attempted to dislodge them, but failed to do so at the Battle of Catraeth. The Angles then established themselves at Reeth, Stainton, Grinton Bridge and Fremington. By the mid-9th century the area had been invaded by Norsemen who settled first the lower and then the upper valley. After the Norman invasion, the lands of the valley were given to Alan the Red of Brittany who built the castle at Richmond between 1071 and 1091. It was built on a bluff overlooking the River Swale.

In the 7th century, St Paulinus supposedly immersed thousands of people in a baptismal rite at Brompton-on-Swale and further downstream at Brafferton. Because so many had been baptised in this way, 19th-century writers have labelled the Swale as England's River Jordan. Mass baptisms are still carried out in the river around the Catterick Bridge area.

== Economy ==
Over the centuries, lead mining and cattle farming have been the main industries, but competition from the rest of the world saw them decline by the end of the 19th century. Some crop farming also took place, most notably during the warm periods of the 13th century.

Tourism now plays a major role in the economy of the river valley. The Yorkshire Dales Cycle Way follows the valley between Fremington and Gunnerside. The Coast to Coast Walk passes through Richmond to Reeth and is crossed at Keld by the Pennine Way, which goes through the upper valley from Buttertubs Pass to Muker.

== Gallery ==
Along the River Swale
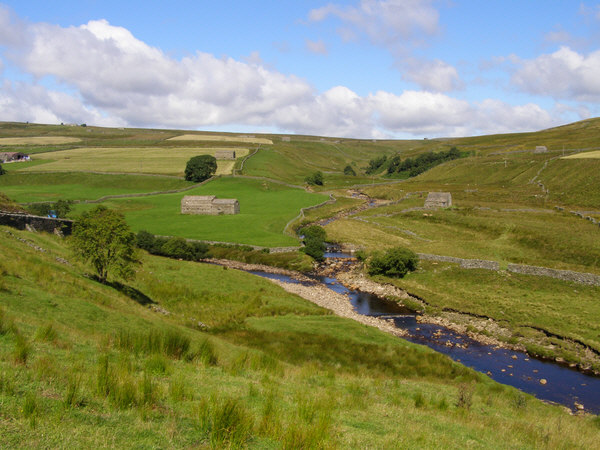
Whitsundale Beck joins the River Swale

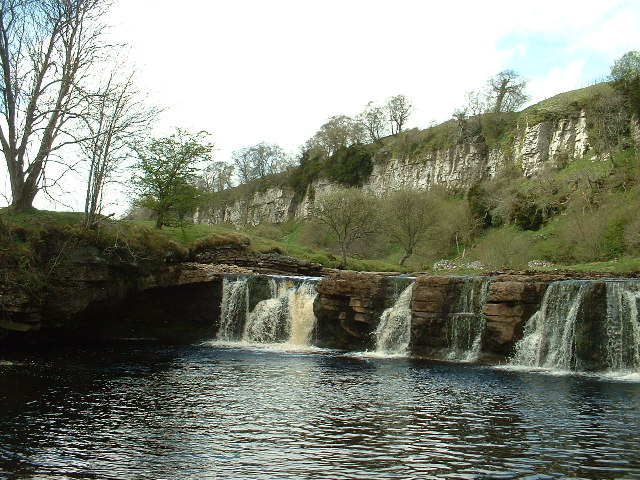
Wain Wath Force, near Keld, with the limestone cliffs of Cotterby Scar in the background.

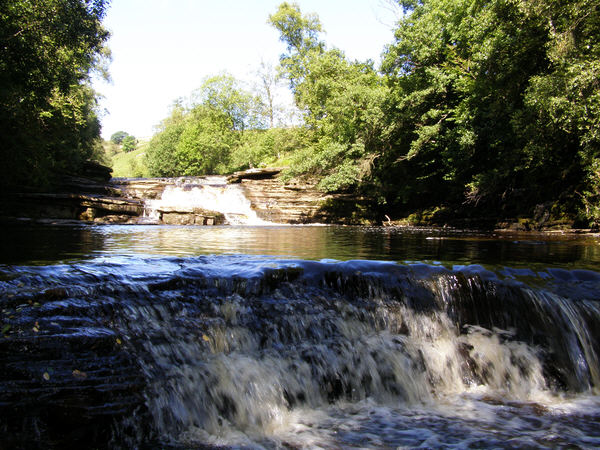
Catrake Force

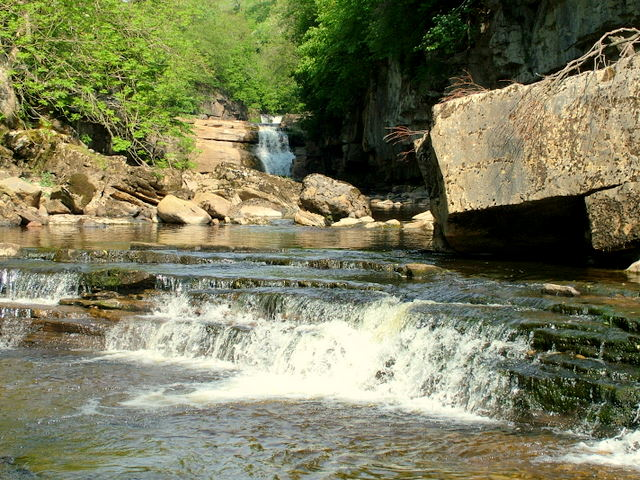
Kisdon Force on River Swale

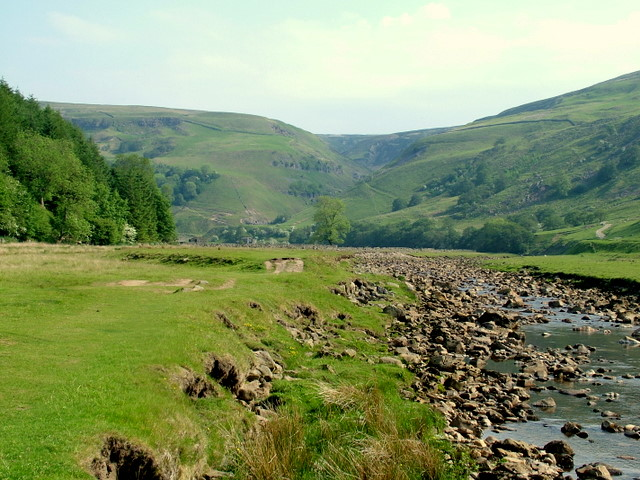
River Swale near Muker

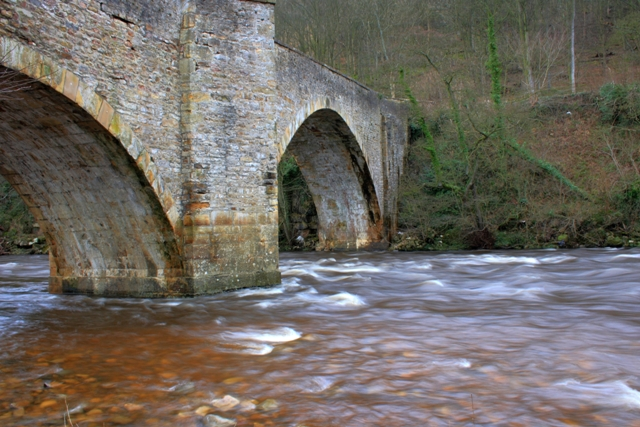
River Swale flowing under Downholme Bridge

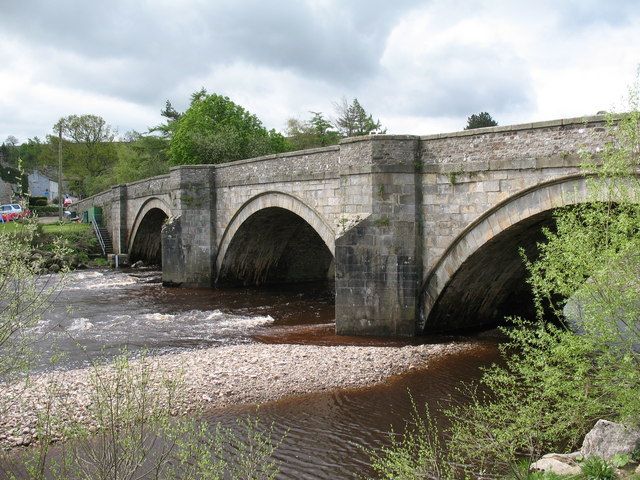
Grinton Bridge

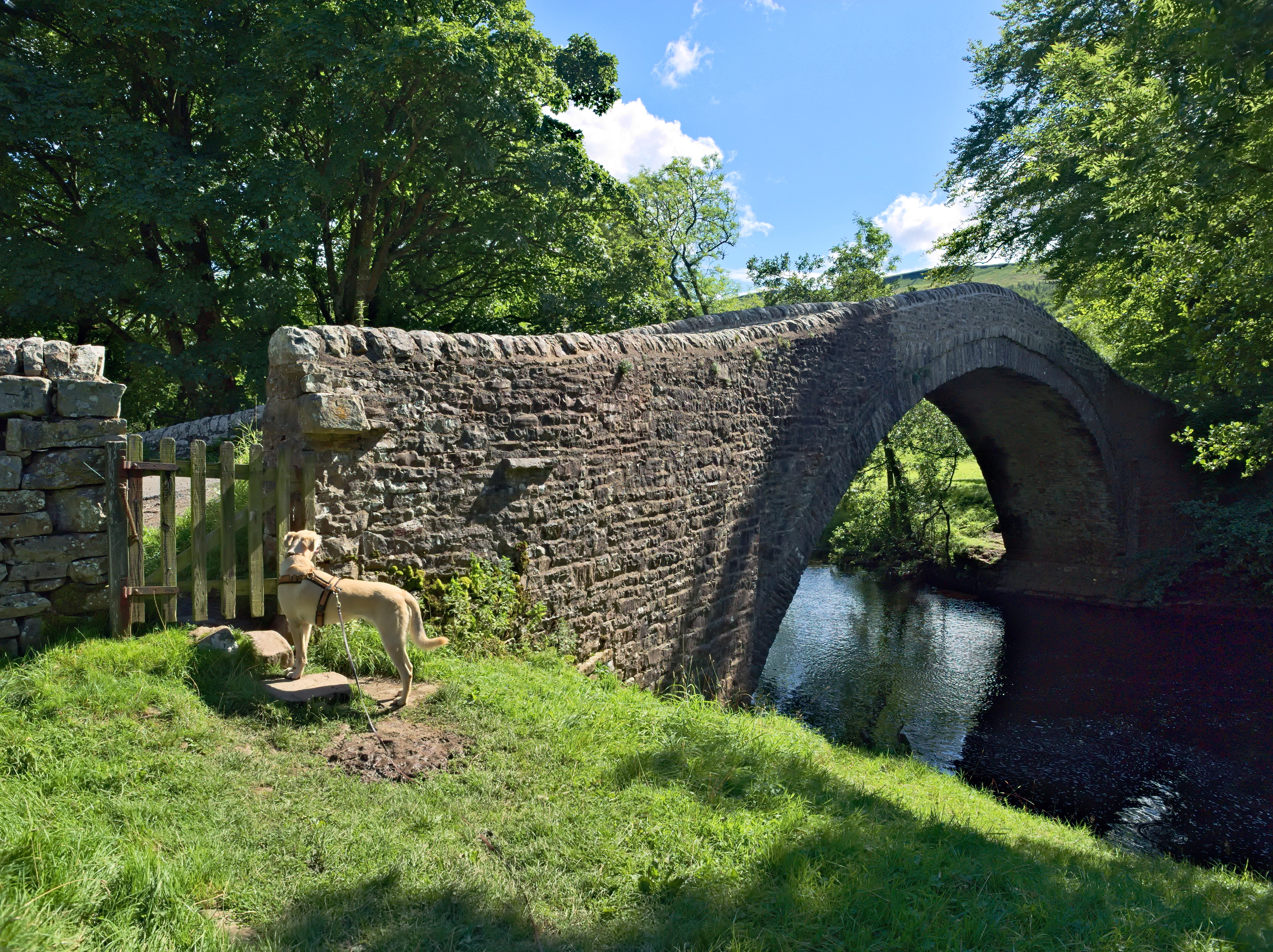
Ivelet Bridge

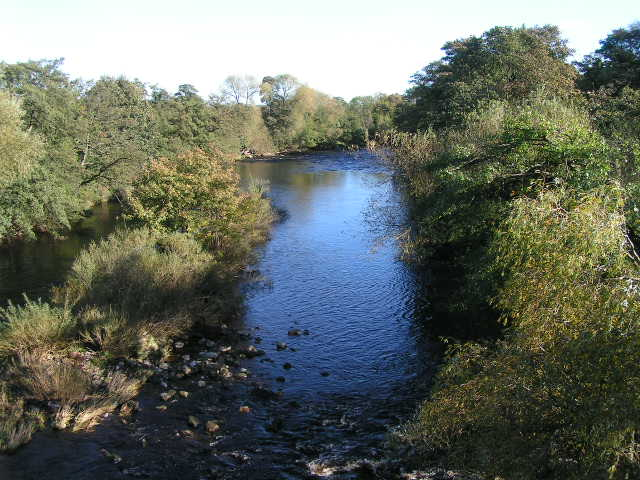
River Swale from Catterick Bridge

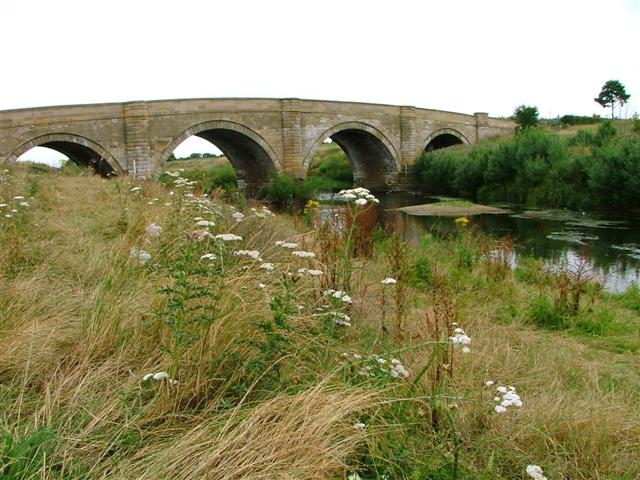
Morton Bridge, A684 Crossing the River Swale

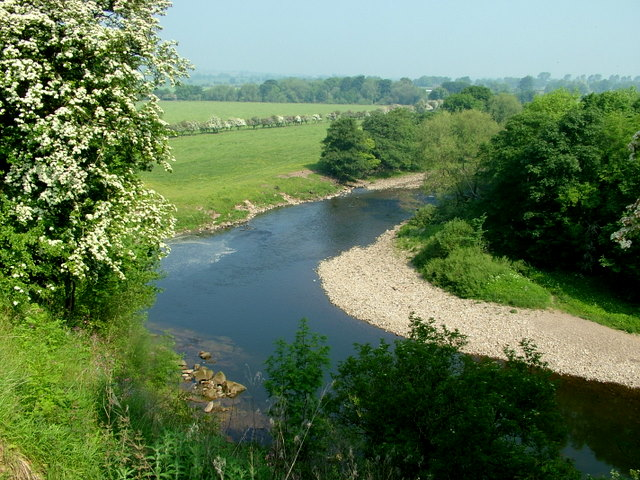
River Swale near Brompton-on-Swale

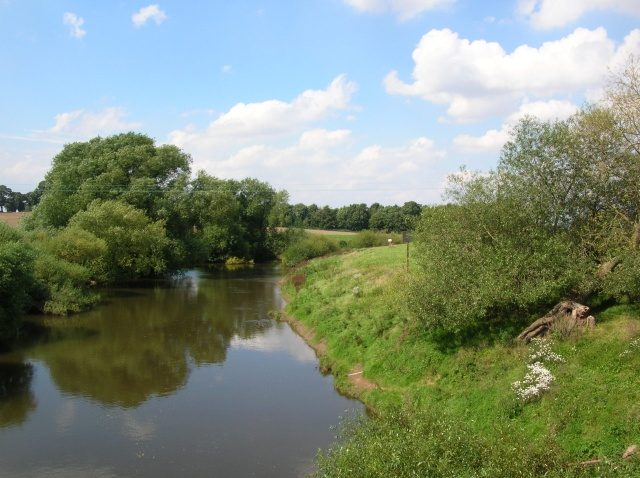
River Swale from bridge near Brafferton

== Lists ==
=== Settlements ===
- Keld
- Muker
- Gunnerside
- Low Row
- Reeth
- Grinton
- Richmond
- Brompton-on-Swale
- Catterick Bridge
- Catterick
- Great Langton
- Little Fencote
- Morton-on-Swale
- Gatenby
- Maunby
- Pickhill
- Skipton-on-Swale
- Catton
- Baldersby St James
- Topcliffe
- Cundall
- Fawdington
- Brafferton
- Helperby
- Myton-on-Swale

=== Tributaries ===
- Holme Ash Gill 54°24′11.37″N 2°13′6.08″W
- Little Ash Gill 54°24′20.38″N 2°12′32.63″W
- Great Ash Gill 54°24′26.33″N 2°12′6.83″W
- Whitsunudale Beck 54°24′27.99″N 2°11′50.00″W
- Blackburn Beck 54°24′33.11″N 2°10′48.27″W
- Stonesdale Beck 54°24′31.73″N 2°10′28.76″W
- Oldfield Gutter 54°24′5.88″N 2°9′6.11″W
- Swinner Gill 54°23′56.07″N 2°8′36.93″W
- West Arn Gill 54°23′44.50″N 2°8′25.28″W
- Straw Beck 54°22′35.40″N 2°8′3.83″W
- Routin Gill 54°22′29.20″N 2°7′25.83″W
- Oxnop Gill 54°22′32.11″N 2°6′17.05″W
- Shore Gill 54°22′34.86″N 2°5′56.92″W
- Gunnerside Gill 54°22′32.05″N 2°4′42.41″W
- Haverdale Beck 54°22′20.68″N 2°2′15.51″W
- Mirk Gill 54°22′18.48″N 2°1′46.33″W
- Birks Gill 54°22′19.31″N 2°1′44.01″W
- Scabba Wath 54°22′50.16″N 1°59′15.05″W
- Barney Beck 54°22′53.87″N 1°58′37.77″W
- Arkle Beck 54°22′55.33″N 1°56′4.60″W
- Cogden Beck 54°22′46.47″N 1°54′45.42″W
- Hags Gill 54°22′25.15″N 1°53′54.76″W
- Gill Beck 54°22′32.83″N 1°51′18.93″W
- Gill Beck 54°22′32.83″N 1°51′18.93″W
- Oxque Beck 54°23′4.36″N 1°50′23.91″W
- Marske Beck 54°23′46.83″N 1°49′42.70″W
- Clapgate Beck 54°24′17.93″N 1°49′20.56″W
- Sand Beck 54°23′53.03″N 1°43′8.34″W
- Colburn Beck 54°23′31.10″N 1°41′9.56″W
- Skeeby Beck 54°23′36.73″N 1°40′27.51″W
- Brough Beck 54°22′15.05″N 1°36′38.62″W
- Fiddale Beck 54°21′52.02″N 1°33′55.71″W
- Kiplin Beck 54°21′49.43″N 1°33′21.67″W
- The Stell 54°21′28.32″N 1°32′15.85″W
- Mill Beck 54°20′14.50″N 1°31′47.21″W
- Bedale Beck 54°18′15.21″N 1°30′50.03″W
- River Wiske 54°14′38.19″N 1°26′19.94″W
- Cod Beck 54°10′3.88″N 1°21′58.63″W
- Crakehill Beck 54°9′7.14″N 1°20′22.01″W
- Cundall Beck 54°8′13.20″N 1°20′18.10″W
- Arn Gill 54.38847°N 2.14071°W

=== Crossings ===
See List of crossings of the River Swale
