= Kearton =

Hamlet in North Yorkshire, England

Coordinates: 54.38687°N 2.00901°W

- Location within North Yorkshire
- OS grid reference: SD995990
- Unitary authority: North Yorkshire
- Ceremonial county: North Yorkshire
- Region: Yorkshire and the Humber
- Country: England
- Sovereign state: United Kingdom
- Post town: RICHMOND
- Postcode district: DL11
- Police: North Yorkshire
- Fire: North Yorkshire
- Ambulance: Yorkshire

Kearton is a hamlet in the Yorkshire Dales, North Yorkshire, England. Kearton is situated near Low Row and Reeth.

From 1974 to 2023 it was part of the district of Richmondshire, it is now administered by the unitary North Yorkshire Council.

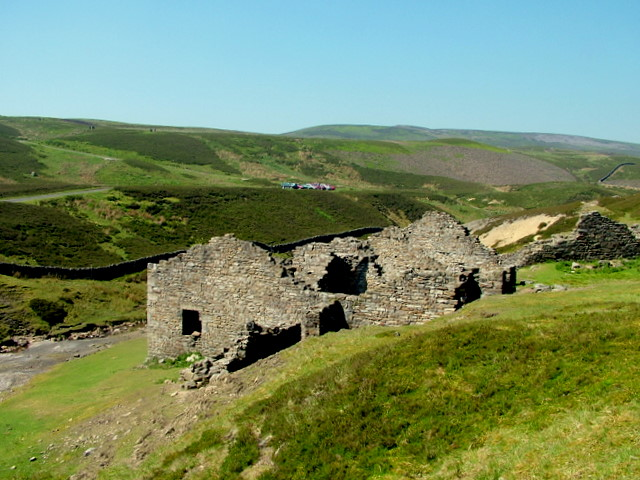
Surrender Mill at Surrender Bridge, near Kearton, the ruins of a former lead smelting site

== See also ==
- Listed buildings in Melbecks
