= Feetham =

Hamlet in North Yorkshire, England

Coordinates: 54.3809°N 2.02208°W

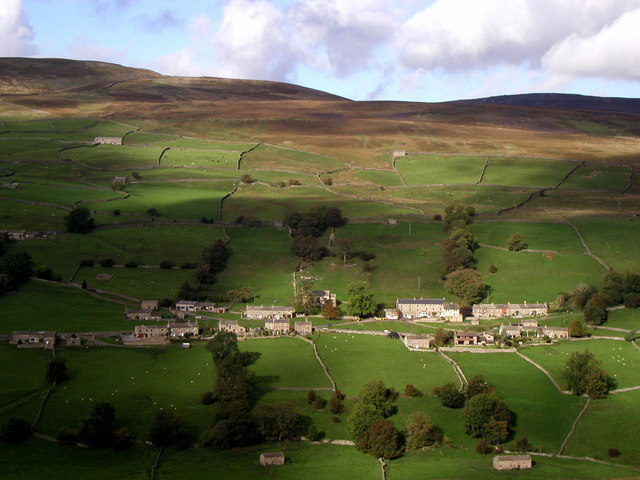
- Looking south into Swaledale with Feetham below

- Location within North Yorkshire
- OS grid reference: SD986983
- Unitary authority: North Yorkshire
- Ceremonial county: North Yorkshire
- Region: Yorkshire and the Humber
- Country: England
- Sovereign state: United Kingdom
- Police: North Yorkshire
- Fire: North Yorkshire
- Ambulance: Yorkshire

Feetham is a hamlet opposite Low Row in the Yorkshire Dales, North Yorkshire, England.

From 1974 to 2023 it was part of the district of Richmondshire, it is now administered by the unitary North Yorkshire Council.

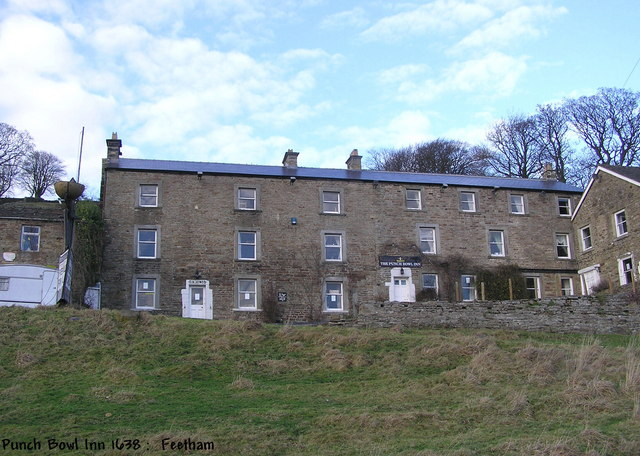
Punch Bowl Inn, Feetham

The origin of the place-name is from Old Norse and means place at the riverside meadows; it appears as Fytun in 1242.

== See also ==
- Listed buildings in Melbecks
