= Low Row =

Village in North Yorkshire, England

Coordinates: 54°22′38″N 2°01′44″W

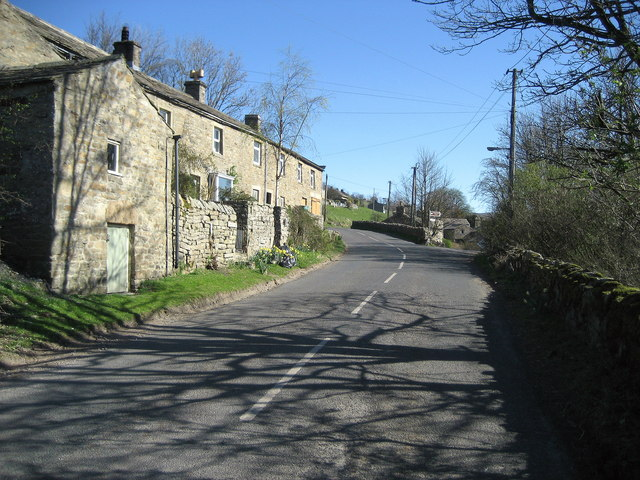
- Entering Low Row

- Location within North Yorkshire
- OS grid reference: SD980978
- Unitary authority: North Yorkshire
- Ceremonial county: North Yorkshire
- Region: Yorkshire and the Humber
- Country: England
- Sovereign state: United Kingdom
- Post town: RICHMOND
- Postcode district: DL11
- Police: North Yorkshire
- Fire: North Yorkshire
- Ambulance: Yorkshire

Low Row is a village in Swaledale, in the Yorkshire Dales, North Yorkshire, England. It lies about 3 miles (4.8 km) west of Reeth and is between Healaugh and Gunnerside. It is part of the civil parish of Melbecks. It is a linear village running along one road, the B6270. To the east, Low Row merges with the settlement of Feetham.

From 1974 to 2023 it was part of the district of Richmondshire, it is now administered by the unitary North Yorkshire Council.

A working farm, Hazel Brow Farm, is open to visitors and The Punch Bowl, a stone inn dated 1638, is by the main road.

== History ==
The name Low Row comes from the Norse "The Wra" (a nook). The surname "Raw" is associated with the village. The village was raided by Jacobites in 1745, and bodies probably from that raid are buried at Holy Trinity Church, Melbecks, in Low Row.

On 5 July 2014, the Tour de France Stage 1 from Leeds to Harrogate passed through the village.

== Smarber Chapel and Low Row United Reformed Church ==
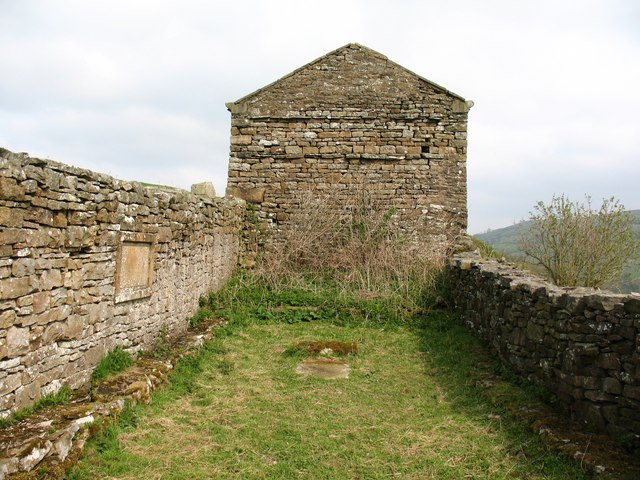
The remains of Smarber Chapel in 2009, looking east. The chapel is in the foreground. The former cottage, now a barn, stands behind

Philip, Lord Wharton, owned land in the area. On this stood a number of shooting lodges including one at Crackpot, near Keld, and one at Smarber, a small hamlet on the ridge to the west of Low Row. A Puritan sympathiser, in around 1690 Wharton converted part of the Smarber lodge into a chapel for ‘Protestant Dissenters’. He particularly had the needs of the local lead miners in mind.

It was a small, simple building; the lower part of the dry-stone wall remains and shows evidence of plaster and the location of a window. At the east end, an adjoining barn still stands. This also shows traces of plaster and windows and is considered originally to have been a cottage attached to the chapel. It is known that Wharton bought land near Kirkby Stephen, the income from which was to support a minister at Smarber.

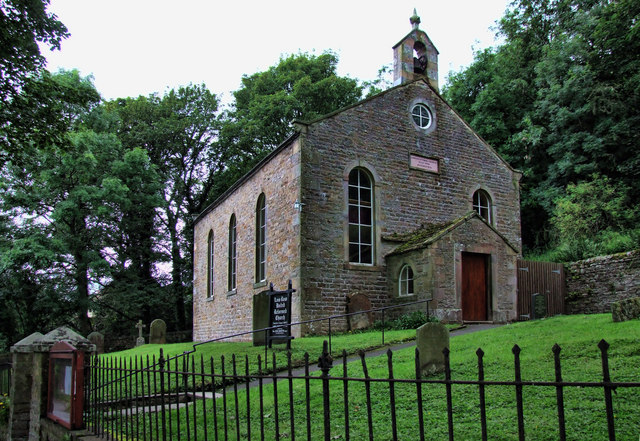
Low Row United Reformed Church, 2007

In 1809 a new chapel was built, beside the road at the west end of Low Row, and the former building fell into disrepair. Having originally tended to favour the Presbyterian position, the chapel declared itself Congregational in 1867, during the 50-year ministry of John Boyd. He also supervised a major rebuild in 1874. This cost over £300 and resulted in the building as seen today. Now part of the United Reformed Church, an active congregation continues to worship in the chapel and ‘pilgrimages’ to the former building take place from time to time.

== In popular culture ==
Some filming for the 2026 version of Wuthering Heights took place in the village.

== See also ==
- Listed buildings in Melbecks
