= Rogan's Seat =

Peak in the Yorkshire Dales, England

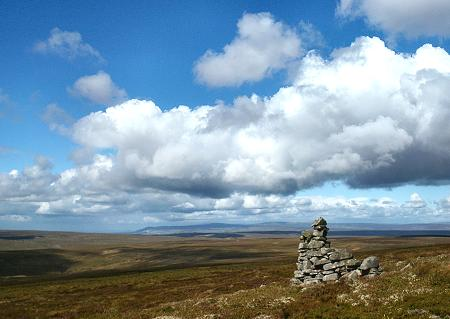
- The moorland from the summit with Mickle Fell in the background

Highest point
- Elevation: 672 m (2,205 ft)
- Prominence: c. 195 m
- Parent peak: Great Shunner Fell
- Listing: Marilyn, Hewitt, Nuttall
- Coordinates: 54°25′24″N 2°07′35″W

Geography
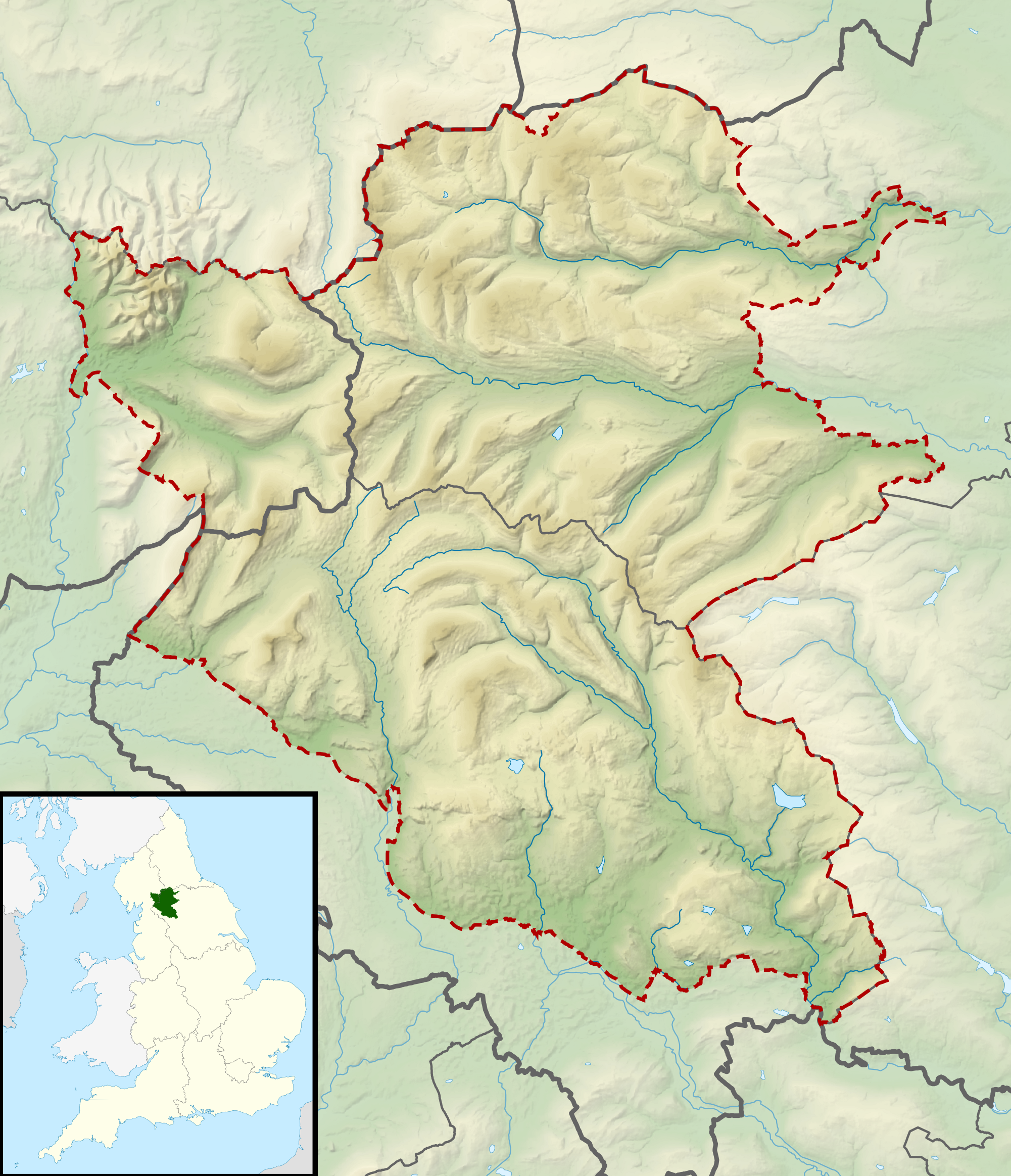
- Location within Yorkshire Dales
- Location: North Yorkshire, England
- Parent range: Yorkshire Dales
- OS grid: NY919031
- Topo map: OS Landranger 98

Rogan's Seat is a remote hill located near East Stonesdale and Gunnerside Gill, in the Yorkshire Dales in England.

It is a high expanse of moorland that stretches alongside Swaledale, Swinner Gill and Gunnerside Gill. It is the joint 17th highest fell in North Yorkshire, along with Great Knoutberry Hill, and reaches a height of 672 metres (2,205 ft).

There has been controversy about how specifically the summit can be reached via a direct footpath; however, landowners of the Yorkshire grouse moors were tolerant in deciding not to publish a correct right of way for walkers. Despite this drawback, it attracts a lot of local interest, particularly being just 2 kilometres from the lower Valley waterfalls in Gunnerside Gill.

The most appropriate route to ascend Rogan's Seat to its summit would be to divert leftbound from Gunnerside Gill and follow a bridleway track north for 2 kilometres. The track is fairly flat but for explorative walkers the journey back down the same route can become tedious.

The views are not special due to the wide expanse of moorland, although Great Shunner Fell, Ingleborough and Whernside can be seen to the west.

Water Crag is a secondary summit to the north east, with trig point, at 668 metres (2,192 ft).
