= Midford Castle =

Building in Bath, Somerset, England

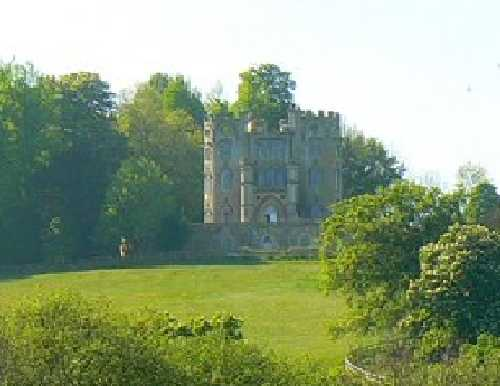
- Midford Castle
- Interactive map of the Midford Castle area

General information
- Architectural style: Gothic
- Location: Midford, Somerset 51°21′2″N 2°20′47″W, England
- Completed: 1775
- Client: Henry Disney Roebuck

Design and construction
- Architect: John Carter

Midford Castle is a folly castle in the village of Midford, and the parish of Southstoke 3 miles (5 km) south of Bath, Somerset, England.

The castle was built in 1775 for Henry Disney Roebuck from designs by John Carter in the shape of the "clubs" symbol used in playing cards (♣). It has been suggested, originally in a magazine article in 1899, that he asked for the clubs design to represent an ace of clubs because he had obtained the money for the castle from gambling on a card game, but this is unlikely, as the porch which creates the "stem" of the symbol was added later. It is more likely that the layout was taken from an article which had been published in Builder's Magazine in 1774. The house has a sub triangular or trefoil plan formed by 3 semi-circular towers conjoined in a gothic style. It has been designated by English Heritage as a Grade I listed building.

In 1810, the castle was bought by one of the Conollys of Castletown House in County Kildare, who added the porch (said to give the clubs symbol its stalk) and built the nearby stables and chapel, known as the priory. The latter fell into disrepair after the last of the Conollys sold the house in 1901.

Soon after 1810 Kingham Field, which was part of the estate, was operating as a stone quarry similar to the nearby Combe Down and Bathampton Down Mines. William Smith, who became known as "Father of English Geology", proposed conveying the stone by a railway down to Tucking Mill where it would be sawn by machinery, and then loaded on to canal barges and transported via the Somerset Coal Canal and the Kennet and Avon Canal to Bath and London. In April 1814, Smith mortgaged the remainder of his estate to Charles Conolly who then controlled the railway and probably extended it to his Vinegar Down Quarry. The scheme failed and in 1819 Conolly had Smith committed to the King's Bench Prison for debt and took over the sawmill and Smith's house at Tucking Mill.

Michael Fenwick Briggs and his wife Isabel (better known by her pen name of Isabel Colegate) bought Midford in 1961 and carried out extensive renovation work; which included incorporating the chapel into the garden as a picturesque ruin.

In July 2007, the castle was sold to actor Nicolas Cage for £5 million. Cage sold the castle in 2009 to Scott Adams, founder of Nutrisport.

The castle was then restored and converted into its current form as both the Adams family home, and a boutique hotel.

The castle is listed Grade I on the National Heritage List for England. The castle grounds also include the Grade II listed archway with lodge and screen wall, a pair of gatepiers and gates, and the Grade II* listed group of the stables, old chapel, walls enclosing the stable yard, coach house and greenhouse. The priory 500 yards to the north east of the castle is Grade II listed.

== See also ==
- Sham Castle
- Beckford's Tower
- Browne's Folly
