= Pieter Boogaart =

Dutch writer

Pieter Boogaart is the European Secretary of the Folly Fellowship. A noted book reviewer and teacher, he lives with his wife and collaborator, Rita Boogaart, in the Netherlands.

== Works ==
Boogaart is the author of the book A272 - An Ode to a Road (Pallas Athene, 2000), which covers the road itself as well as selected places within six or seven miles to the north and south.
