= Folly =

Type of building

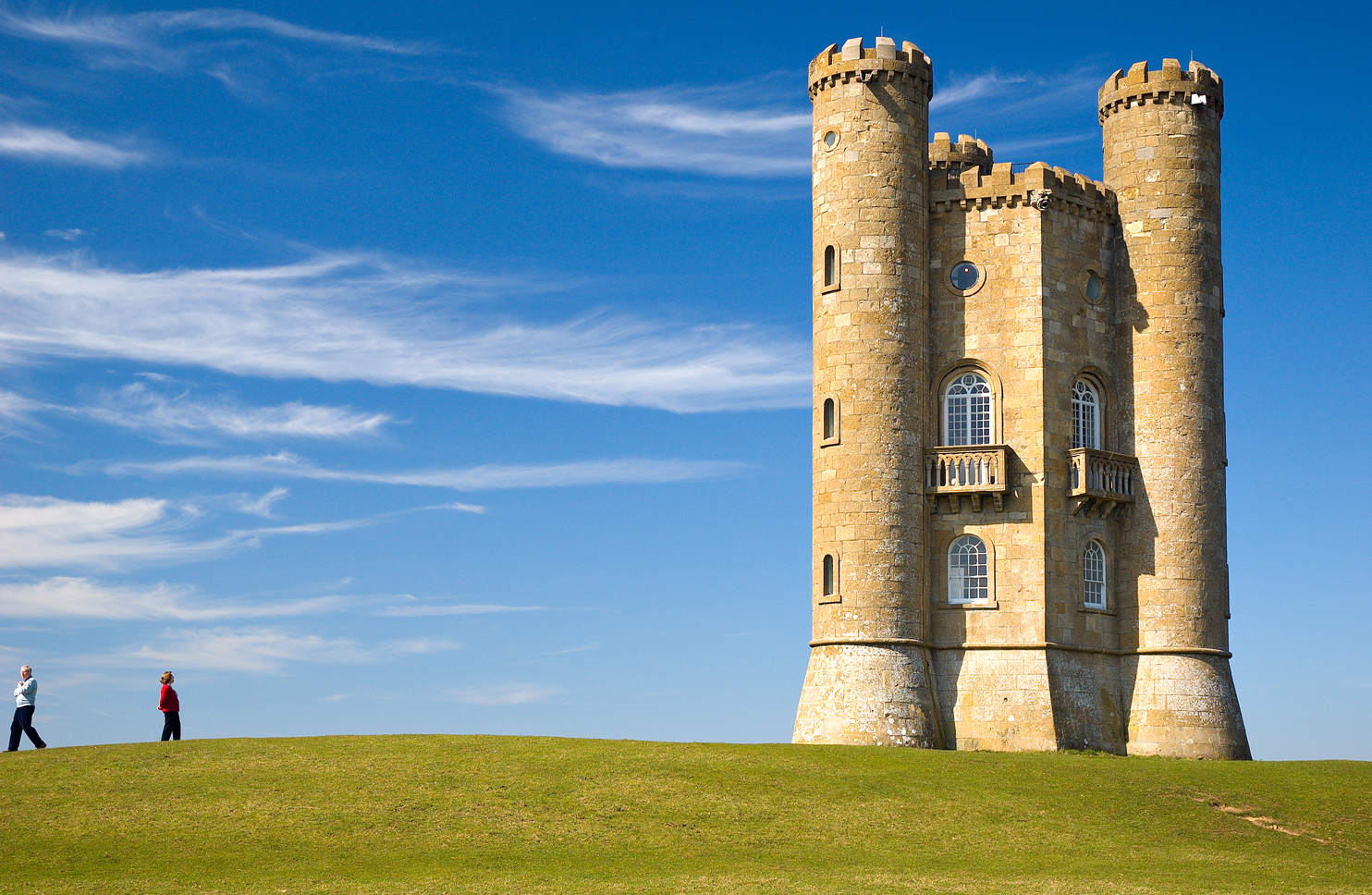
Broadway Tower, Worcestershire, England

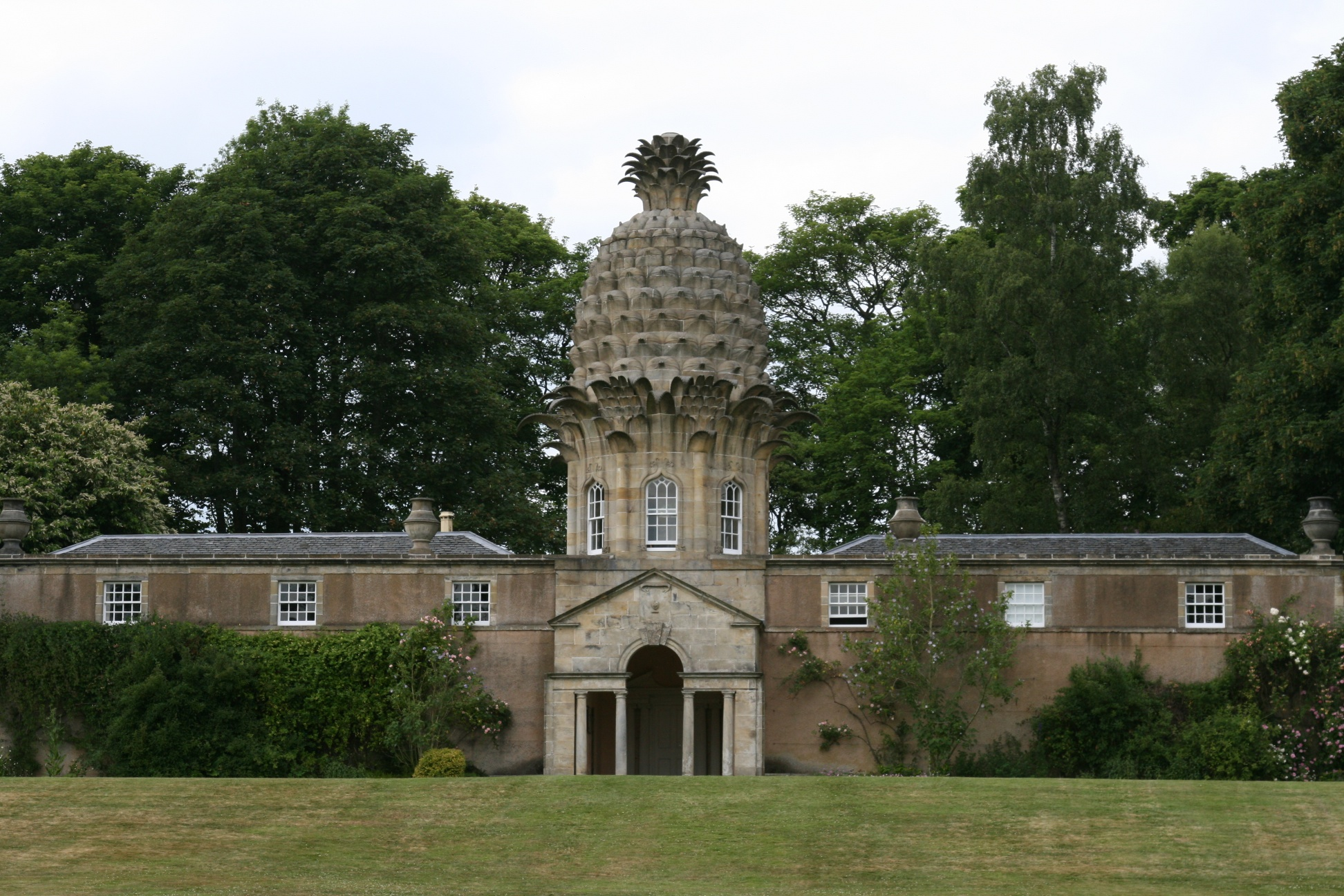
The Dunmore Pineapple in Scotland (attributed to William Chambers)

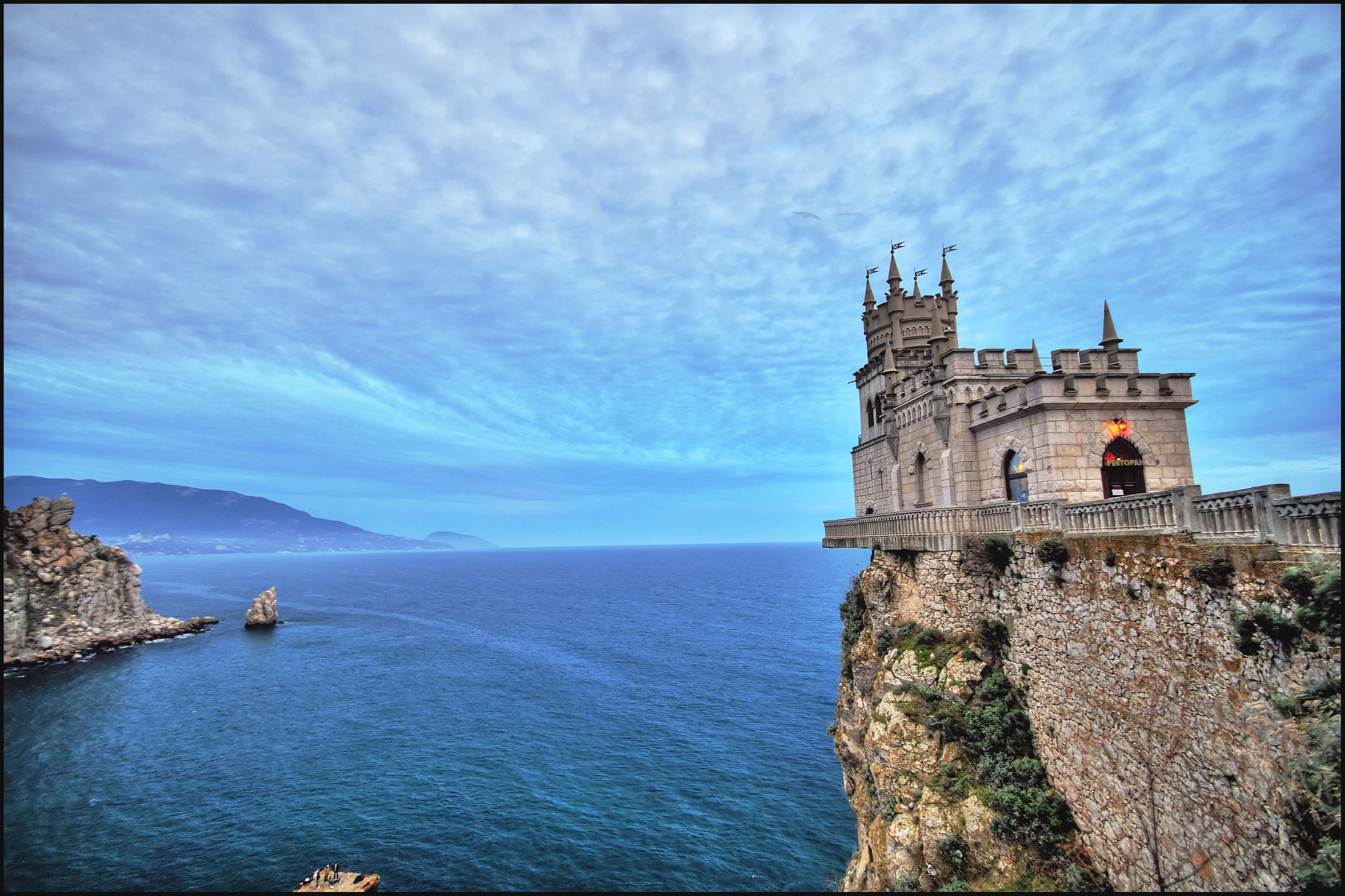
Built in 1912, the Swallow's Nest is one of the Neo-Gothic châteaux fantastiques in Crimea.

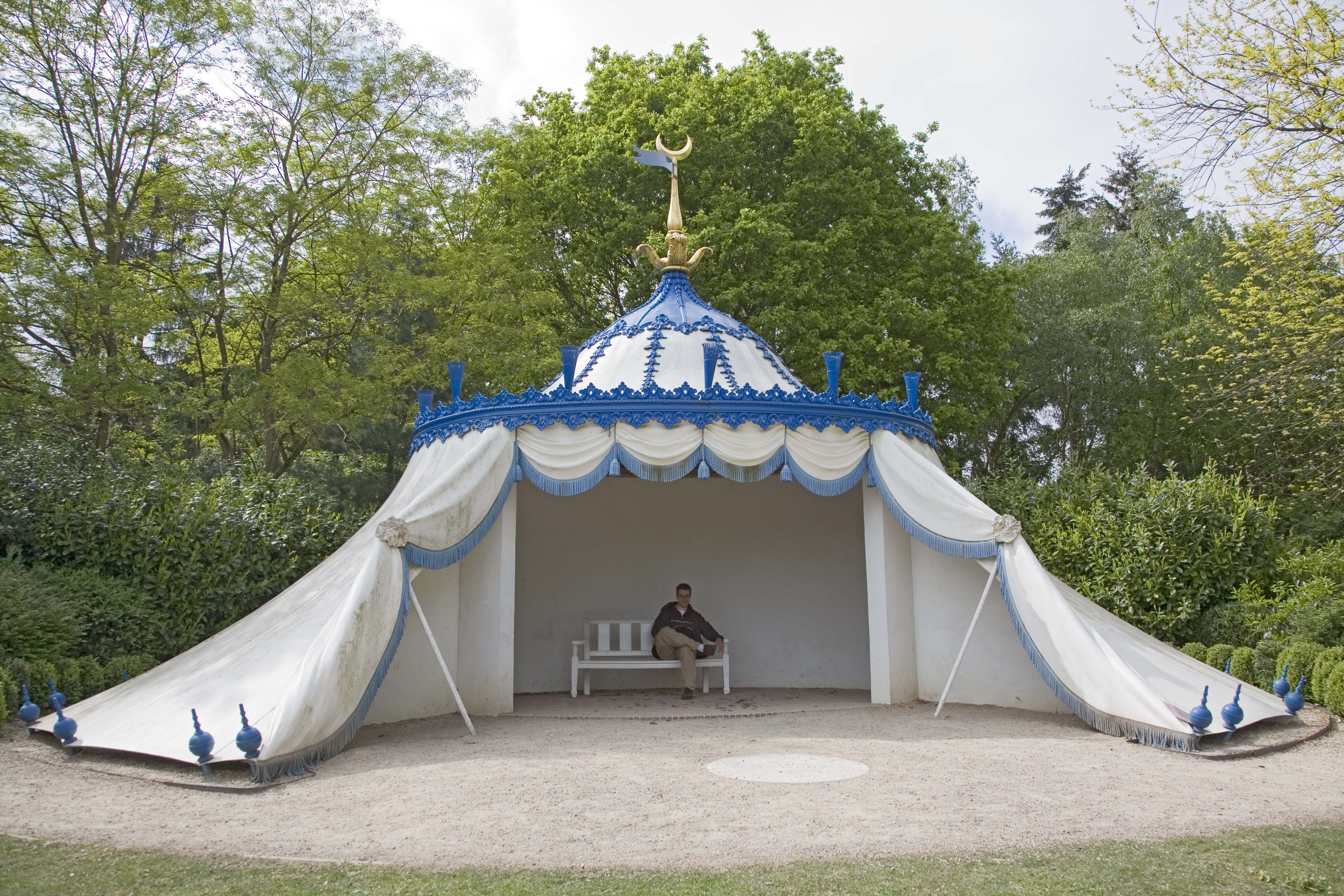
Modern reconstruction of the Turkish Tent, a permanent structure at Painshill, Surrey

In architecture, a folly is a building constructed primarily for decoration, but suggesting through its appearance some other purpose, or of such extravagant appearance that it transcends the range of usual garden buildings.

Eighteenth-century English landscape gardening and French landscape gardening often featured mock Roman temples, symbolising classical virtues. Other 18th-century garden follies imitated Chinese temples, Egyptian pyramids, ruined medieval castles, abbeys, or Tatar tents, to represent different continents or historical eras. Sometimes they represented rustic villages, mills and cottages, to symbolise rural virtues. Many follies, particularly during times of famine, such as the Great Famine in Ireland, were built as a form of poor relief, to provide employment for peasants and unemployed artisans.

In English, the term began as "a popular name for any costly structure considered to have shown folly in the builder", the Oxford English Dictionary's definition. Follies are often named after the individual who commissioned or designed the project. The connotations of silliness or madness in this definition is in accord with the general meaning of the French word folie; however, another older meaning of this word is "delight" or "favourite abode". This sense included conventional, practical buildings that were thought unduly large or expensive, such as Beckford's Folly, an extremely expensive early Gothic Revival country house that collapsed under the weight of its tower in 1825, 12 years after completion.

As a general term, "folly" is usually applied to a small building that appears to have no practical purpose or the purpose of which appears less important than its striking and unusual design, but the term is ultimately subjective, so a precise definition is not possible.

== Characteristics ==
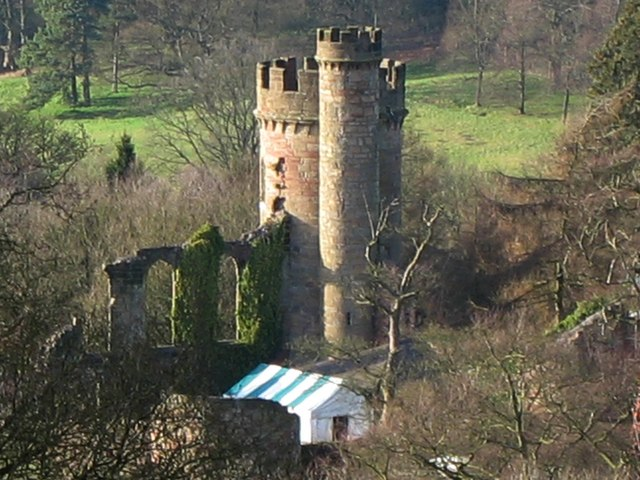
Hagley Castle is in the grounds of Hagley Hall. It was built by Sanderson Miller for George, Lord Lyttelton in the middle of the 18th century to look like a small ruined medieval castle.

The concept of the folly is subjective and it has been suggested that the definition of a folly "lies in the eyes of the beholder". Typical characteristics include:

- They have no purpose other than as an ornament. Often they have some of the appearance of a building constructed for a particular purpose, such as a castle or tower, but this appearance is a sham. Equally, if they have a purpose, it may be disguised.
- They are buildings, or parts of buildings. Thus they are distinguished from other garden ornaments such as sculpture.
- They were built or commissioned for pleasure.

== History ==
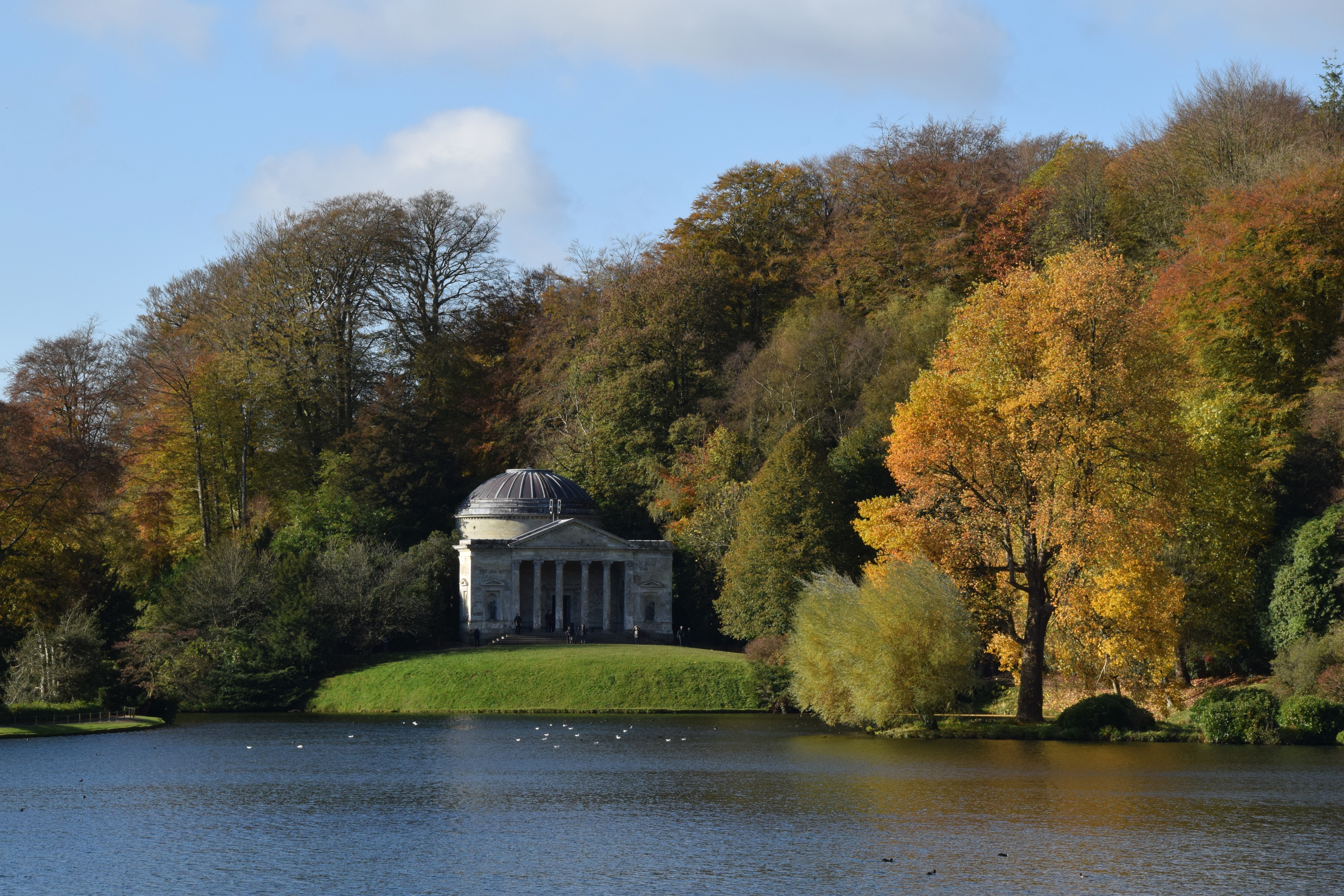
The Pantheon at Stourhead estate

Follies began as decorative accents on the great estates of the late 16th and early 17th centuries, but they flourished especially in the two centuries that followed. Many estates had ruins of monastic houses and (in Italy) Roman villas; others, lacking such buildings, constructed their own sham versions of these romantic structures.

However, very few follies are completely without a practical purpose. Apart from their decorative aspect, many originally had a use which was lost later, such as hunting towers. Follies are misunderstood structures, according to The Folly Fellowship, a charity that exists to celebrate the history and splendour of these often neglected buildings.

=== Follies in 18th-century French and English gardens ===
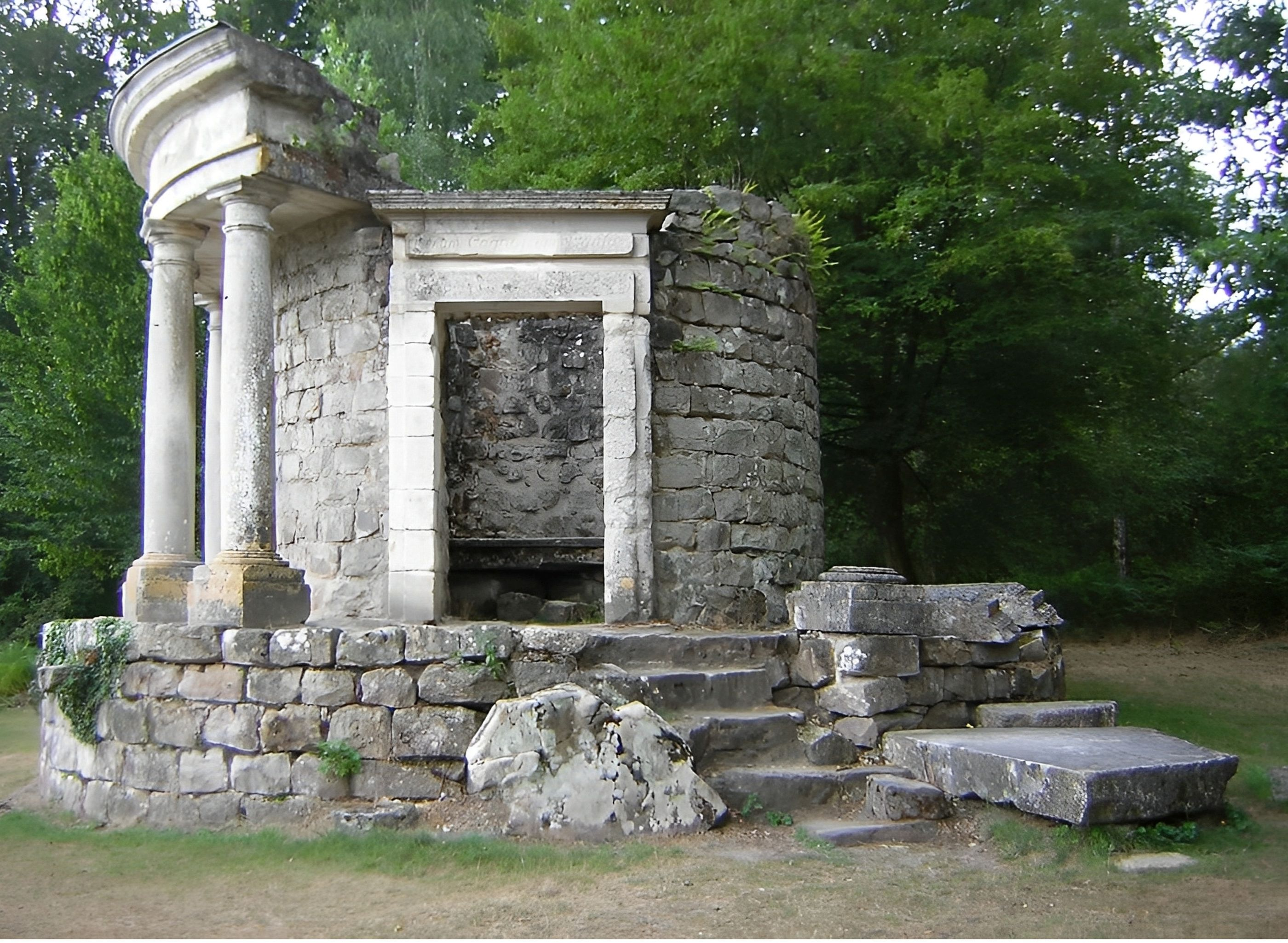
The Temple of Philosophy at Ermenonville in Oise, France

Follies (French: fabriques) were an important feature of the English garden and French landscape garden in the 18th century, such as Stowe and Stourhead in England and Ermenonville and the gardens of Versailles in France. They were usually in the form of Roman temples, ruined Gothic abbeys, or Egyptian pyramids. Painshill Park in Surrey contained almost a full set, with a large Gothic tower and various other Gothic buildings, a Roman temple, a hermit's retreat with resident hermit, a Turkish tent, a shell-encrusted water grotto and other features. In France they sometimes took the form of romantic farmhouses, mills and cottages, as in Marie Antoinette's Hameau de la Reine at Versailles. Sometimes they were copied from landscape paintings by painters such as Claude Lorrain and Hubert Robert. Often, they had symbolic importance, illustrating the virtues of ancient Rome, or the virtues of country life. The temple of philosophy at Ermenonville, left unfinished, symbolised that knowledge would never be complete, while the temple of modern virtues at Stowe was deliberately ruined, to show the decay of contemporary morals.

Later in the 18th century, the follies became more exotic, representing other parts of the world, including Chinese pagodas, Japanese bridges, and Tatar tents.

=== Famine follies ===
The Great Famine of Ireland of 1845–1849 led to the building of several follies in order to provide relief to the poor without issuing unconditional handouts. However, to hire the needy for work on useful projects would deprive existing workers of their jobs. Thus, construction projects termed "famine follies" came to be built. These included roads in the middle of nowhere, between two seemingly random points, screen and estate walls, piers in the middle of bogs, etc.

== Examples ==
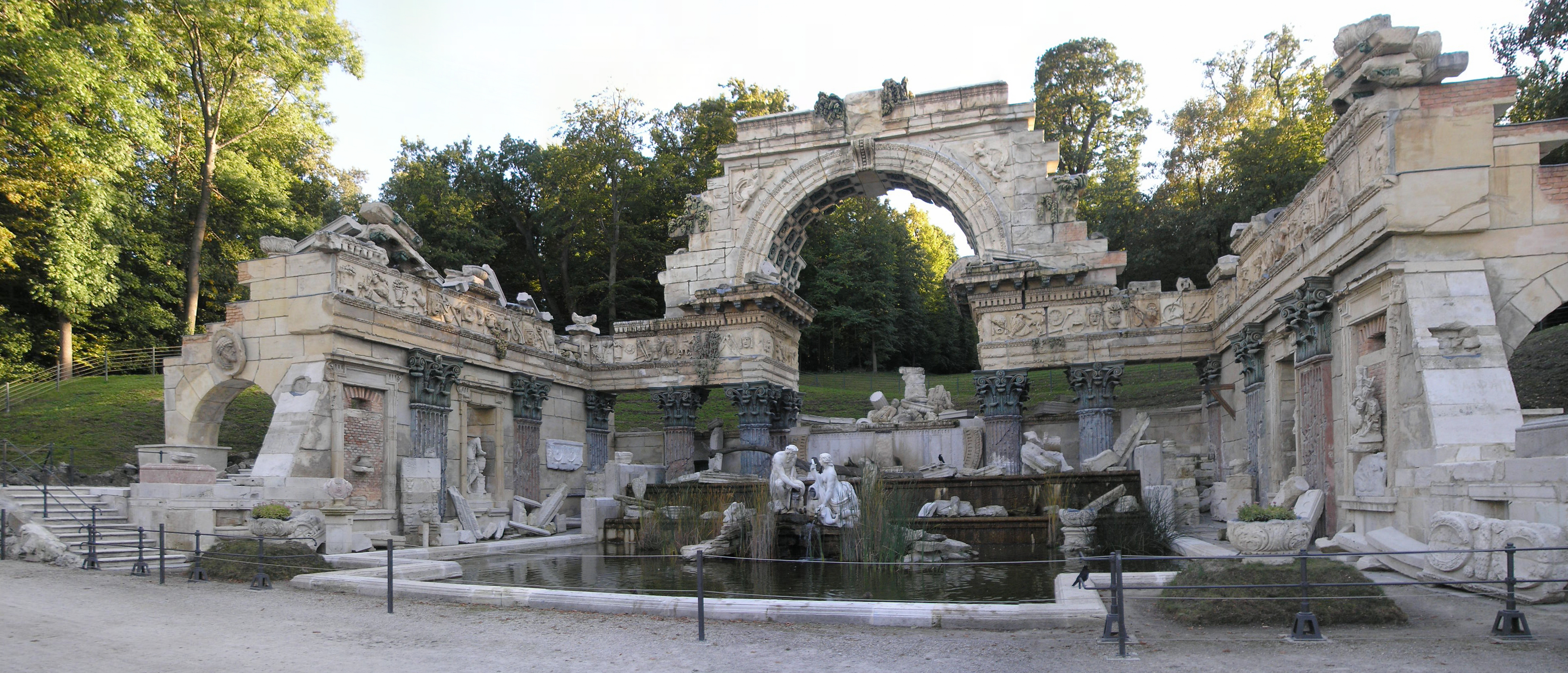
Roman ruin, Schönbrunn, Austria

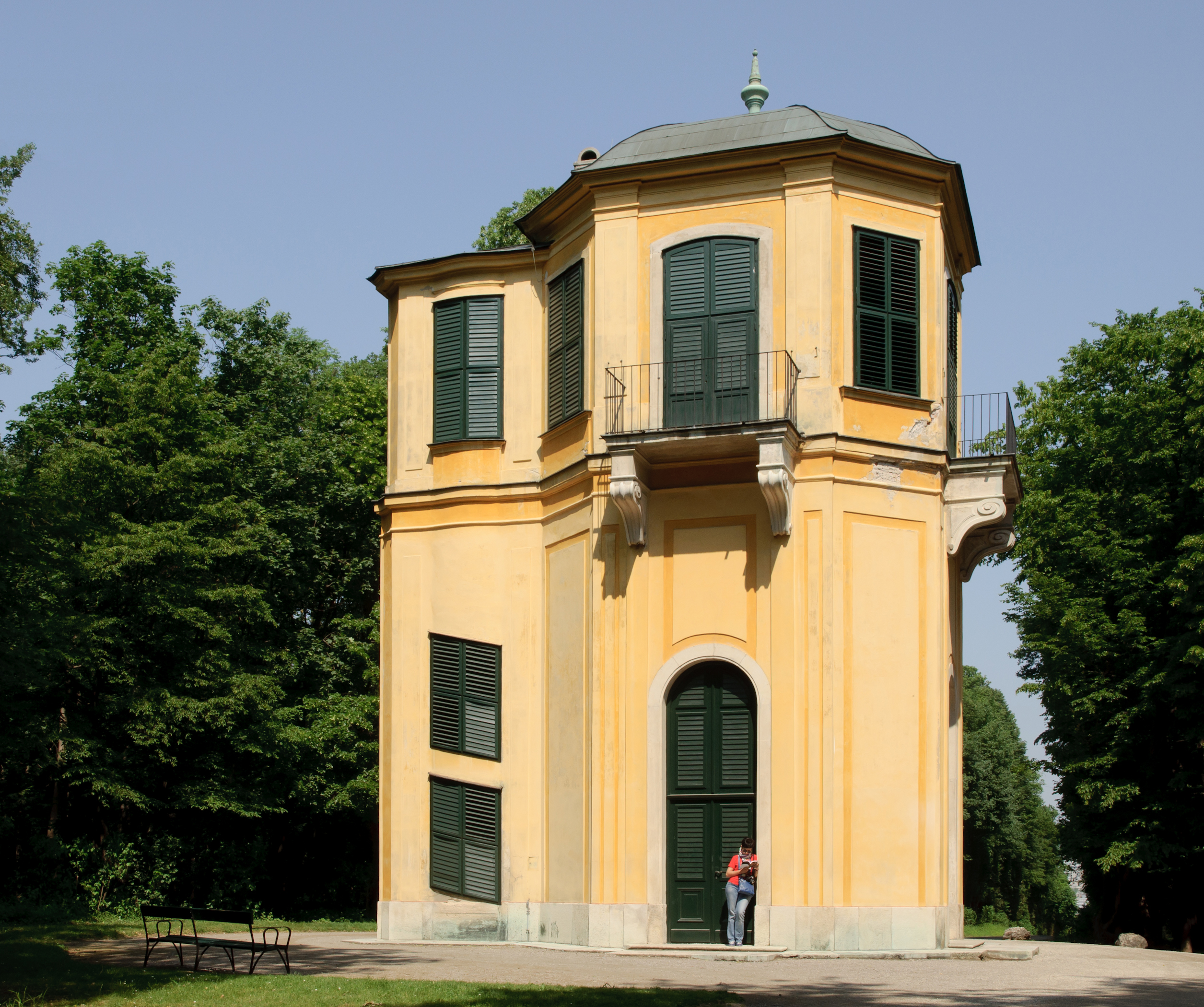
Small Gloriette of Schönbrunn Palace

Follies are found worldwide, but they are particularly abundant in Great Britain.

=== Australia ===
- Eastlink hotel, in Victoria

=== Austria ===
- Roman ruin and gloriettes, in the park of Schönbrunn Palace, Vienna

=== Belgium ===
- Hanssenspark tower in the Hanssenspark in Vilvoorde, Flemish Brabant

=== Canada ===
- Dundurn Castle in Hamilton, Ontario

=== Czech Republic ===
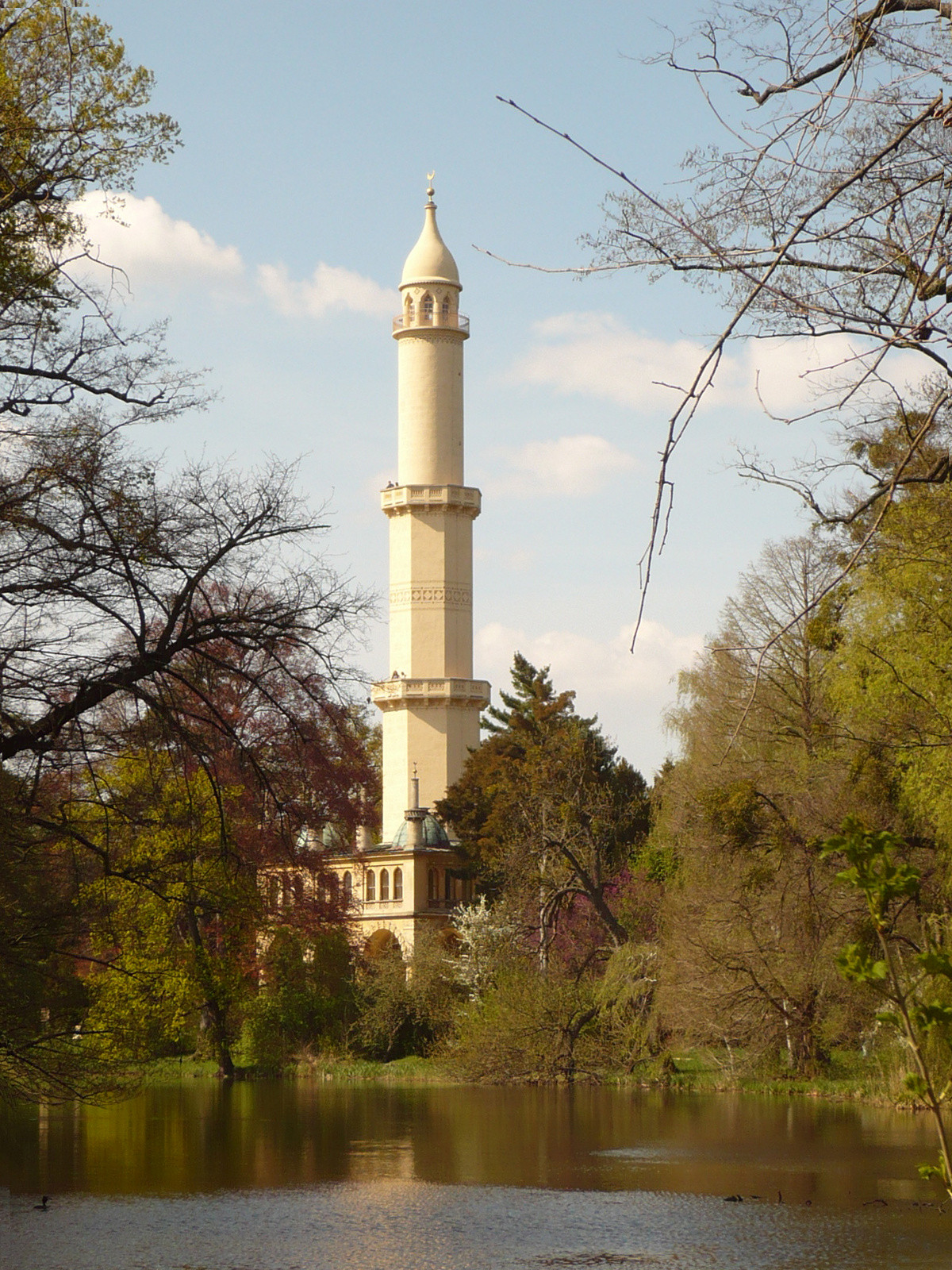
The minaret in the Lednice–Valtice Complex, Czech Republic, was built by the House of Liechtenstein between 1797 and 1804.

- Series of buildings in Lednice–Valtice Cultural Landscape (UNESCO World Heritage Site)
- Chinese Pavilions in chateau gardens in Vlašim, Děčín Krásný Dvůr

=== France ===
- Chanteloup Pagoda, near Amboise
- Désert de Retz, folly garden in Chambourcy near Paris, France (18th century)
- Parc de la Villette in Paris has a number of modern follies by architect Bernard Tschumi.
- The Ideal Palace of Ferdinand Cheval in Hauterives, seen as an example of naive architecture.
- Hameau de la Reine, in the park of the Château de Versailles
- The Grottoes of Ferrand, in Saint-Hippolyte, Gironde

=== Germany ===
- Bergpark Wilhelmshöhe water features
- Lighthouse in the park of Moritzburg Castle near Dresden
- Mosque in the Schwetzingen Castle gardens
- Pfaueninsel artificial ruin, Berlin
- Ruinenberg near Sanssouci Park, Potsdam

=== Hungary ===
- Bory Castle at Székesfehérvár
- Taródi Castle at Sopron
- Vajdahunyad Castle in the City Park of Budapest

=== India ===
- Overbury's Folly, Thalassery, Kerala
- Rock Garden of Chandigarh

=== Ireland ===
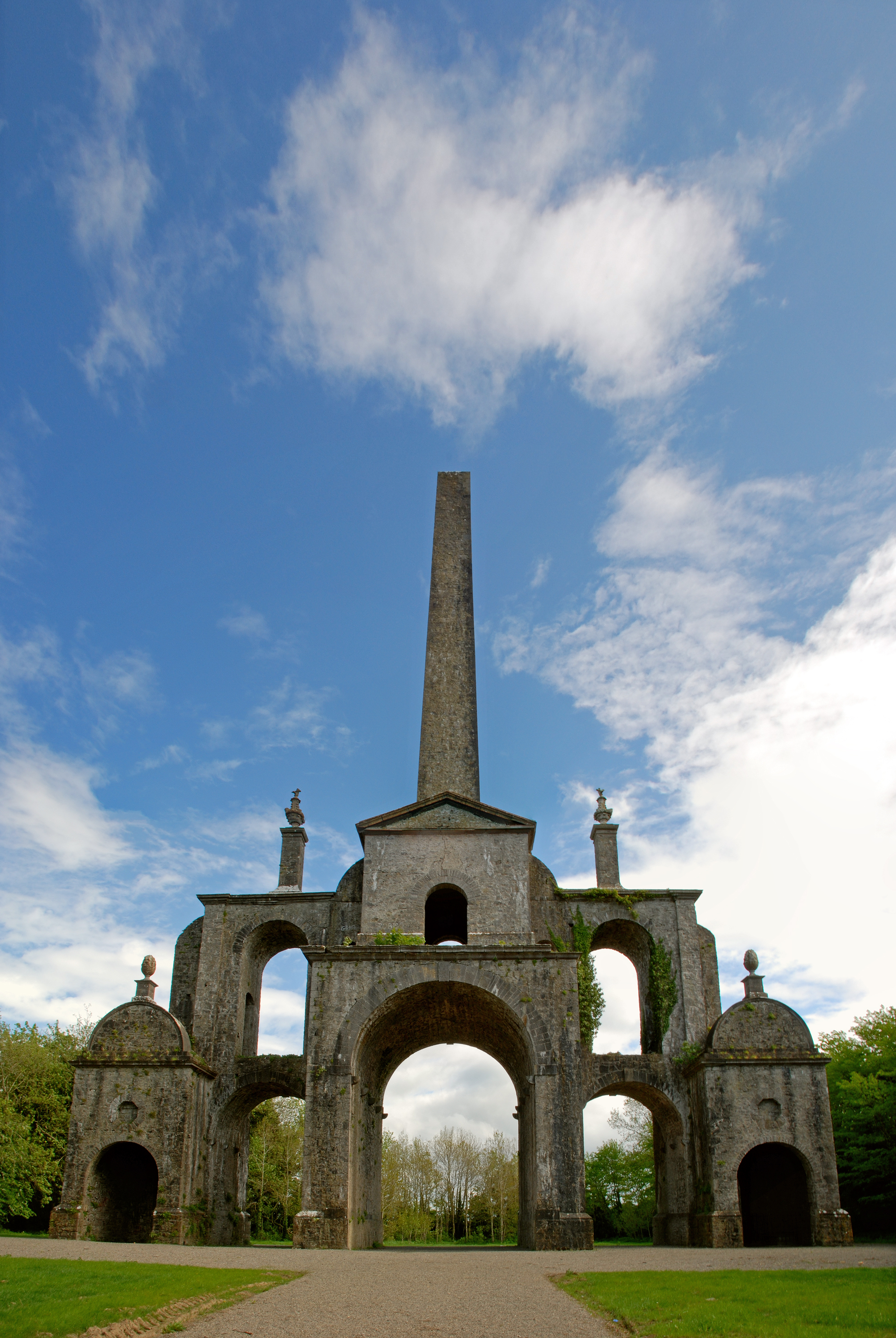
Conolly's Folly, County Kildare, Ireland, built to provide employment in the Irish famine of 1740–41

- Ballysaggartmore Towers, County Waterford
- Carden's Folly
- Casino at Marino
- Conolly's Folly and The Wonderful Barn on the same estate
- The Corrig Spire in Portarlington, County Laois
- Killiney Hill, with several follies
- Larchill in County Kildare, with several follies
- Powerscourt Estate, which contains the Pepperpot Tower
- Saint Anne's Park, which contains a number of follies
- Saint Enda's Park, former school of Patrick Pearse, contains several follies
- The Jealous Wall at Belvedere House near Mullingar, County Westmeath
- Waterloo Round Tower near Blarney, County Cork

=== Italy ===
- La Scarzuola, Montegabbione
- The Park of the Monsters (Bomarzo Gardens)
- Il Giardino dei Tarocchi near Capalbio

=== Jamaica ===
- Three follies were built on Folly Estate, Port Antonio, in 1905. They are now in ruins.

=== Malta ===
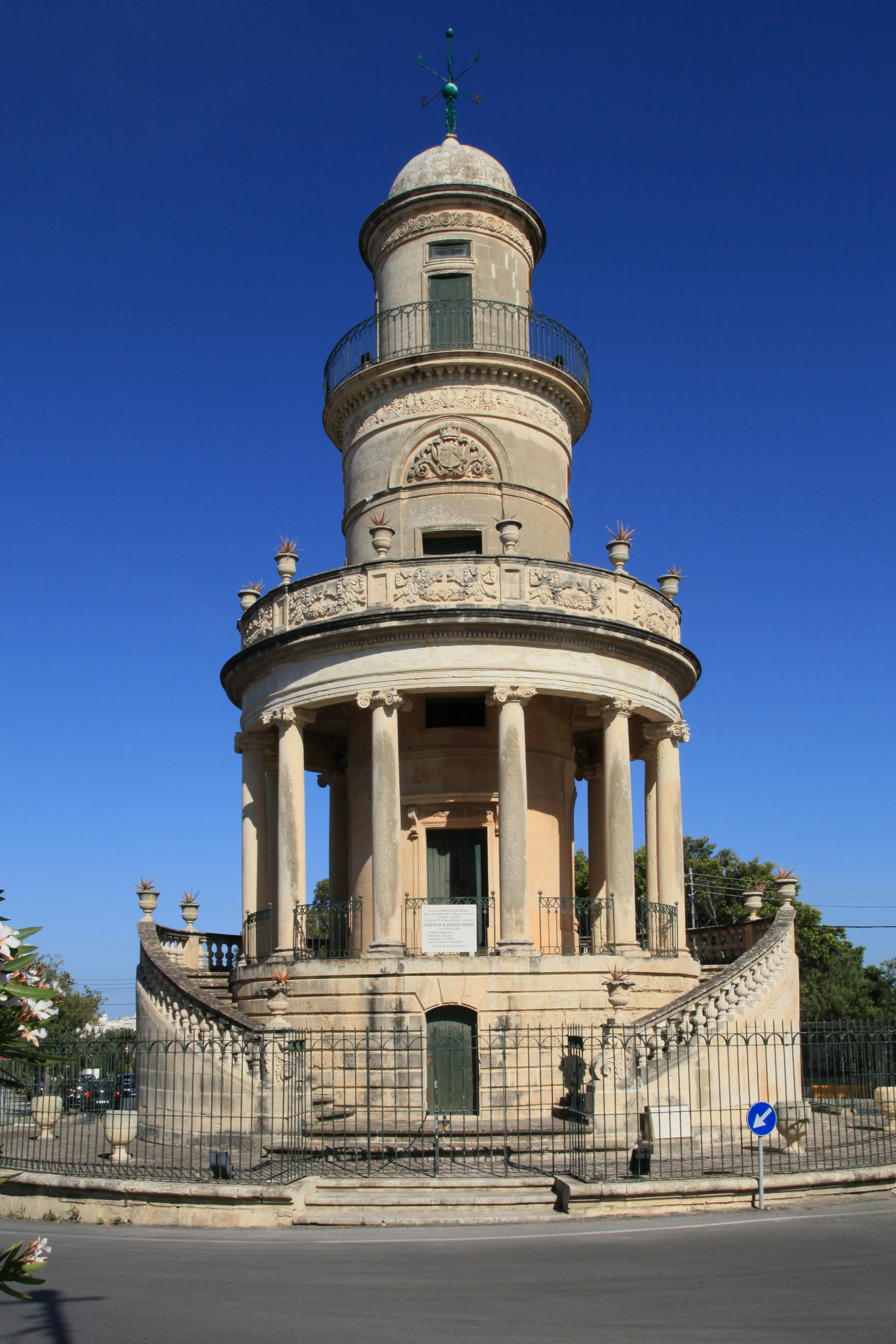
Lija Belvedere Tower in Malta

- Lija Belvedere Tower

=== Poland ===
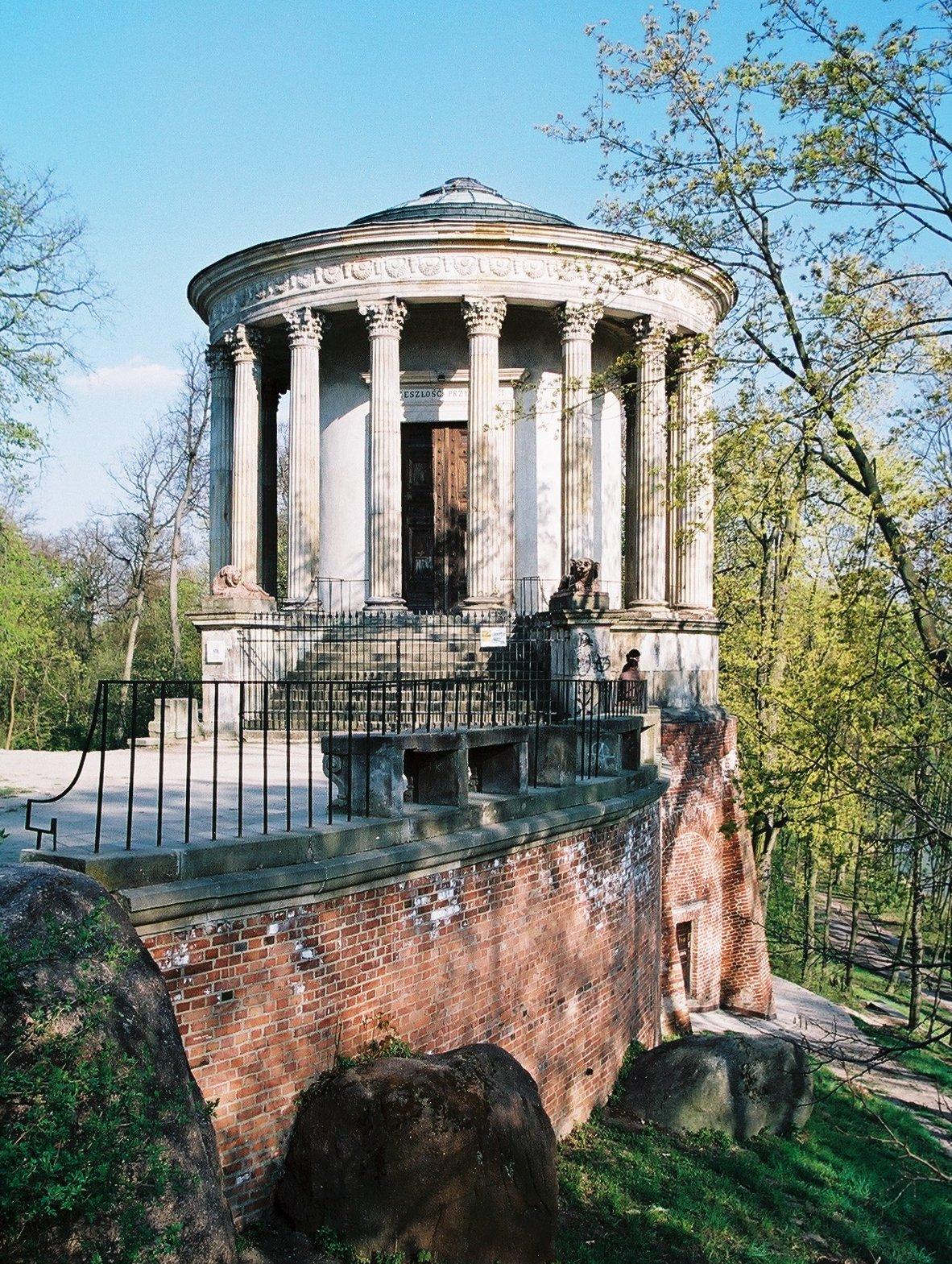
Temple of the Sibyl in the grounds of the Czartoryski Palace in Puławy, Poland

- Roman aqueduct, Arkadia, Łowicz County
- Temple of the Sibyl in Puławy

=== Romania ===
- Iulia Hasdeu Castle

=== Russia ===
- Ruined towers in Peterhof, Tsarskoe Selo, Gatchina, and Tsaritsino
- Creaking Pagoda and Chinese Village in Tsarskoe Selo
- Dutch Admiralty in Tsarskoe Selo

=== Spain ===
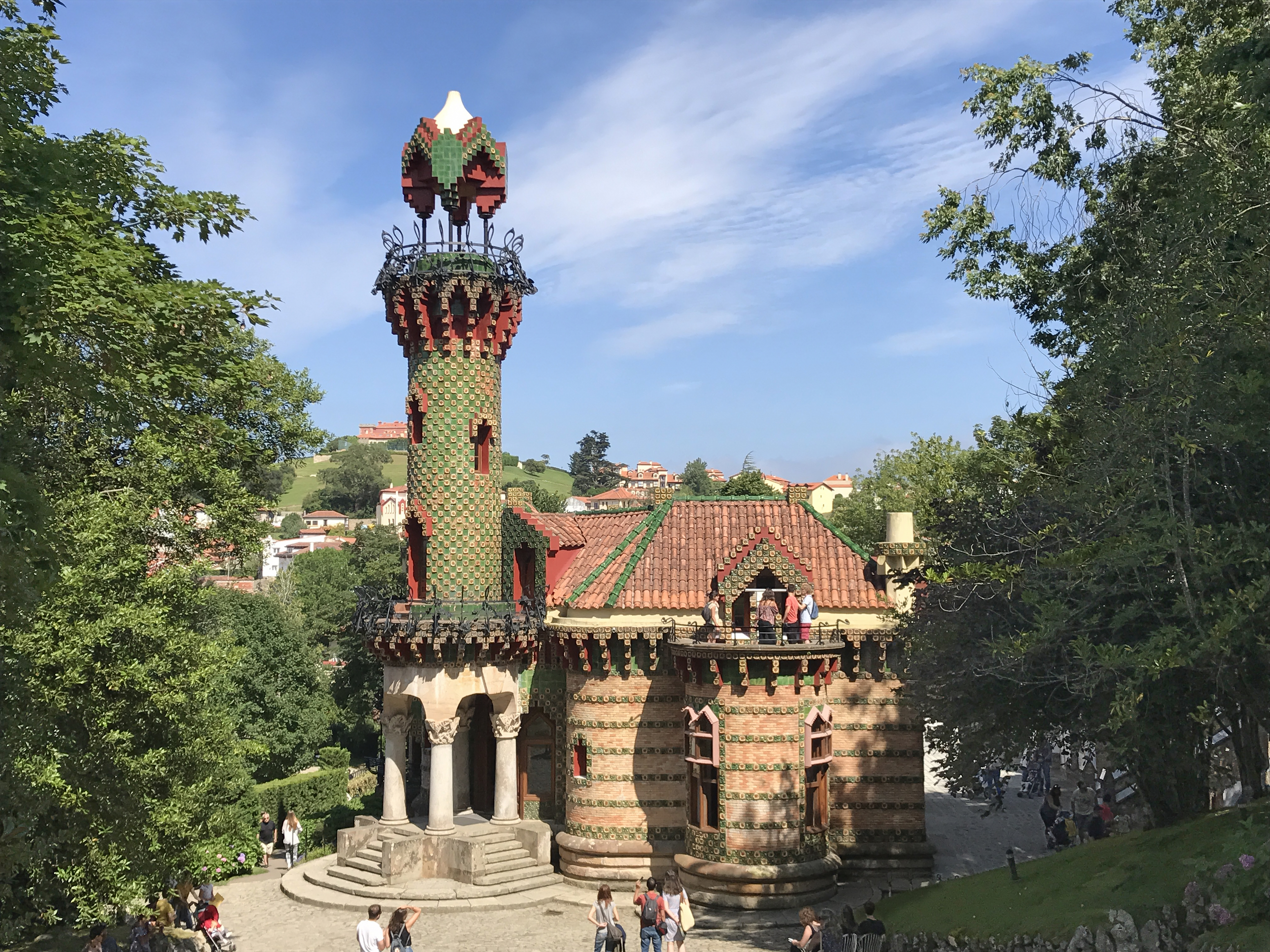
El Capricho, in Comillas, Spain

- El Capricho, Comillas (Cantabria)

=== Ukraine ===
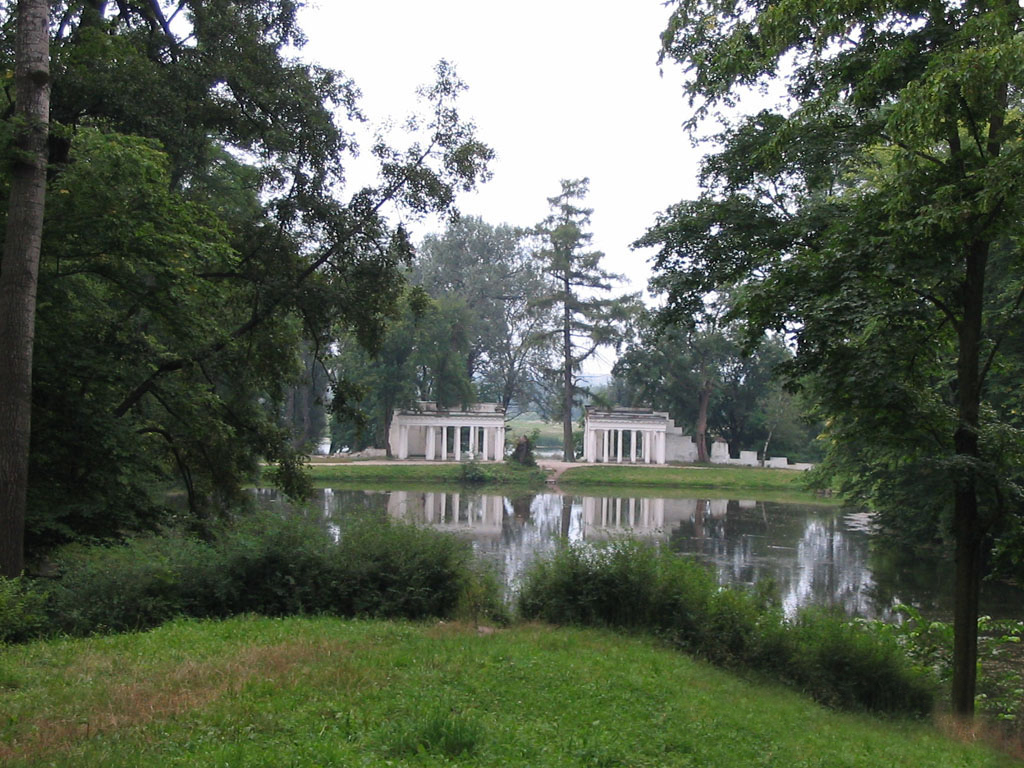
Classical ruins in Oleksandriia Park in Bila Tserkva, Ukraine

- Ruins in Oleksandriia, Bila Tserkva

=== United Kingdom ===
==== England ====
- Ashton Memorial, Lancaster
- Barwick Park follies, Barwick, Somerset
- Beckford's Tower, Somerset
- Blaise Castle, Bristol
- Broadway Tower, The Cotswolds
- Bettison's Folly, Hornsea
- Black Castle Public House, Bristol
- Brizlee Tower, Northumberland
- Browne's Folly, Bathford, Somerset
- The Cage at Lyme Park, Cheshire
- The Castle at Roundhay Park, West Yorkshire
- Chilton Priory, Somerset
- Clavell Tower, Dorset
- Conygar Tower, Dunster, Somerset
- Cranmore Tower, Cranmore, Somerset
- Culloden Tower, Richmond, North Yorkshire
- Faringdon Folly, Faringdon, Oxfordshire
- Flounders' Folly, Shropshire
- Forbidden Corner, North Yorkshire
- Freston Tower, arguably England's oldest folly, near Ipswich, Suffolk
- Garrick's Temple to Shakespeare, Hampton
- Gothic Tower at Goldney Hall, Bristol
- The Great Pagoda, Kew Gardens, London¨
- Hadlow Tower, Hadlow, Kent
- Hardwick Hall Country Park, County Durham contains several restored follies
- Hawkstone Park, follies and gardens in Shropshire
- Hiorne's Tower, Arundel Castle, West Sussex
- Horton Tower, Dorset
- King Alfred's Tower, Stourhead, Somerset
- Lund's Tower, Sutton-in-Craven, North Yorkshire
- Luttrell's Tower, Fawley, Hampshire
- Mow Cop Castle, Staffordshire
- Nab End Tower, Longwood, West Yorkshire
- Old John, Bradgate Park, Leicestershire
- Painshill, Cobham, Surrey, an 18th-century landscape garden with several follies, some modern reconstructions
- Penshaw Monument, Penshaw, Sunderland
- Pelham's Pillar, Caistor, North Lincolnshire
- Perrott's Folly, Birmingham
- Pope's Grotto, Twickenham, South West London
- Prospect Tower, Calstock, Cornwall
- Racton Monument, West Sussex
- Rogers' TowerLudgvan
- The Ruined Arch at the Royal Botanic Gardens, Kew, London
- Rushton Triangular Lodge, Northamptonshire (16th century)
- Severndroog Castle, Shooter's Hill, south-east London
- Sham Castle, Bathwick Hill, Bath, Somerset
- The Sledmere Cross takes the form of an Eleanor Cross and is a true 'folly' that was 'converted' to a World War I Memorial
- Solomon's Temple, Buxton, Derbyshire
- Stainborough Castle, South Yorkshire
- Two of the follies in Staunton Country Park have survived until the present day
- Stowe School has several follies in the grounds
- Sway Tower, New Forest
- Tattingstone Wonder, near Ipswich, Suffolk
- Wainhouse Tower, the tallest folly in the world, Halifax, West Yorkshire
- Wentworth Woodhouse, Wentworth, South Yorkshire: several follies in the estate, including Hoober Stand, Keppel's Column, and the Rockingham Mausoleum.
- Wilder's Folly, Sulham, Berkshire
- Williamson Tunnels, probably the largest underground folly in the world, Liverpool
- Wimpole’s Folly, Cambridgeshire
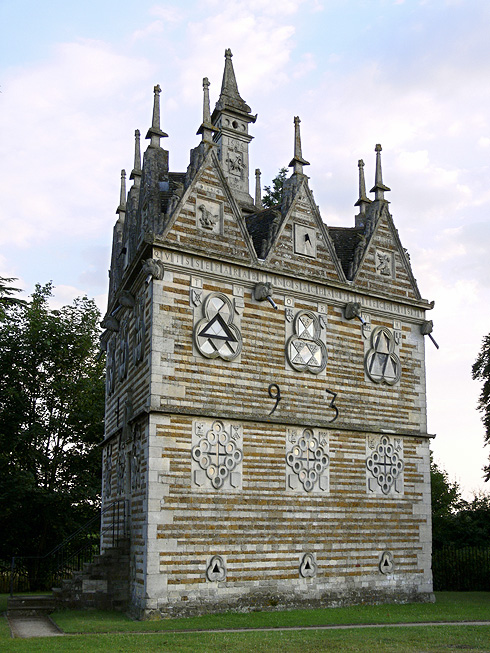
Rushton Triangular Lodge, Northamptonshire, England, built in the late 16th century to symbolise the Holy Trinity

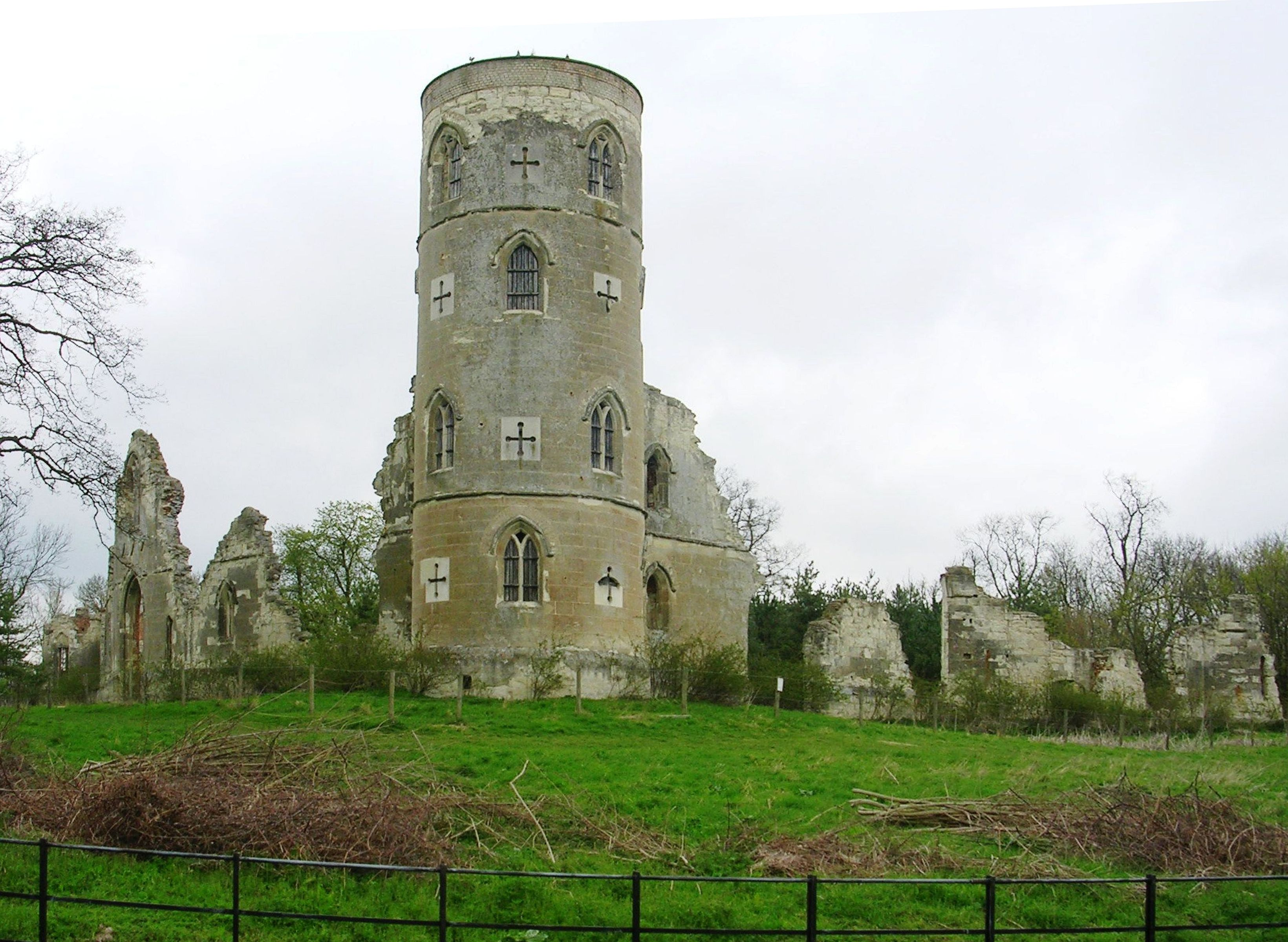
Wimpole's Folly, Cambridgeshire, England, built in the 1700s to resemble Gothic-era ruins

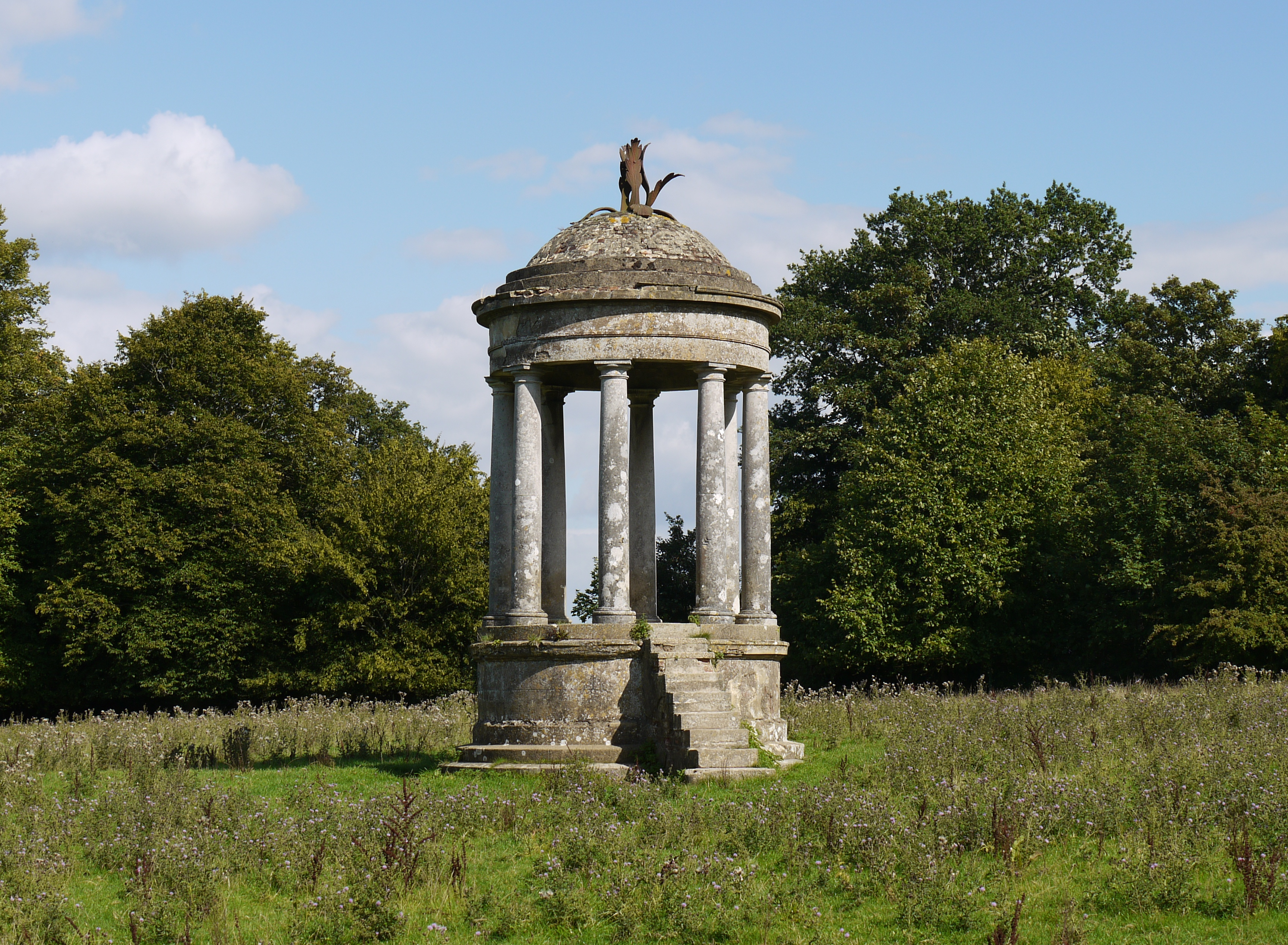
The Beacon: One of the remaining follies at Staunton Country Park originally commissioned by George Thomas Staunton and designed by Lewis Vulliamy

==== Scotland ====
- The Caldwell Tower, Lugton, Renfrewshire
- Captain Frasers Folly (Uig Tower) Isle of Skye
- Dunmore Pineapple, Falkirk
- Hume Castle, Berwickshire
- Kinnoull Tower, Perth
- McCaig's Tower, Oban, Argyll and Bute
- National Monument, Edinburgh
- Shaw Monument, Prestwick
- The Temple near Castle Semple Loch, Renfrewshire
- Binns Tower near House of the Binns, West Lothian

==== Wales ====
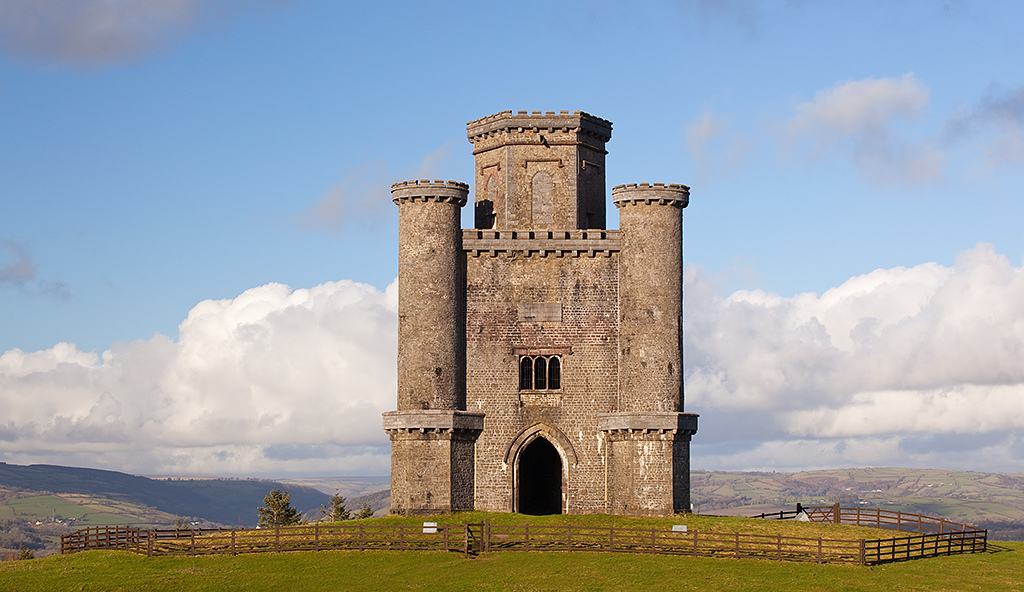
Paxton's Tower, Carmarthenshire

- Clytha Castle, Monmouthshire
- Derry Ormond Tower, Ceredigion
- Folly Tower at Pontypool
- Paxton's Tower, Carmarthenshire
- Portmeirion, known as the setting for several television productions including The Prisoner series
- Gwrych Castle, Conwy County Borough

=== United States ===
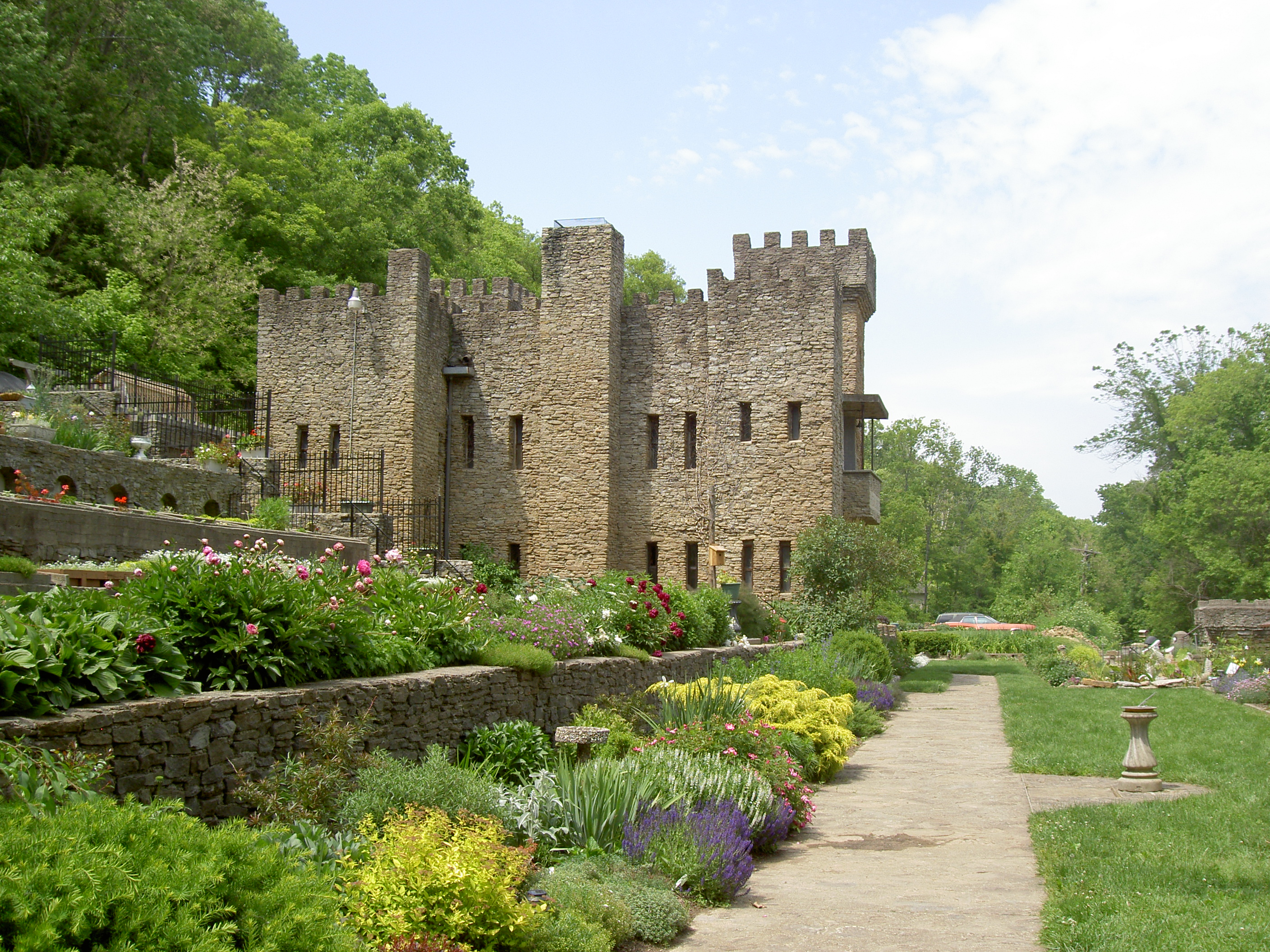
Chateau Laroche, just north of Loveland, Ohio

- Bancroft Tower, Worcester, Massachusetts
- Belvedere Castle, New York City
- Bishop Castle, outside of Pueblo, Colorado
- Chateau Laroche, Loveland, Ohio
- Coral Castle, Homestead, Florida
- Hofmann Tower in Lyons, Illinois
- Kingfisher Tower, Otsego Lake (New York)
- Körner’s Folly, Kernersville, North Carolina
- Lawson Tower, Scituate, Massachusetts
- Maryhill Stonehenge Memorial, Maryhill, Washington
- Palace of Fine Arts, San Francisco, California
- The Parthenon in Nashville, Tennessee
- Vessel, New York, New York
- Watts Towers, Watts, Los Angeles

== See also ==
- Folly Fellowship
- Garden hermit
- Goat tower
- Grotto
- Lustschloss
- Novelty architecture
- Ruin value

== Bibliography ==
- Barlow, Nick, et al. Follies of Europe, Garden Art Press, 2009, ISBN 978-1-870673-56-3
- Barton, Stuart. Monumental Follies Lyle Publications, 1972
- Folly Fellowship, The. Follies Magazine, published quarterly
- Folly Fellowship, The. Follies Journal, published annually
- Folly Fellowship, The. Foll-e, an electronic bulletin published monthly and available free to all
- Hatt, E. M. Follies National Benzole, London 1963
- Headley, Gwyn. Architectural Follies in America, John Wiley & Sons, New York 1996
- Headley, Gwyn & Meulenkamp, Wim. Follies — A Guide to Rogue Architecture, Jonathan Cape, London 1990
- Headley, Gwyn & Meulenkamp, Wim. Follies — A National Trust Guide, Jonathan Cape, London 1986
- Headley, Gwyn & Meulenkamp, Wim., Follies Grottoes & Garden Buildings, Aurum Press, London 1999
- Howley, James. The Follies and Garden Buildings of Ireland Yale University Press, New Haven & London, 1993
- Jackson, Hazelle. Shellhouses and Grottoes, Shire Books, England, 2001
- Jones, Barbara. Follies & Grottoes Constable, London 1953 & 1974
- Meulenkamp, Wim. Follies — Bizarre Bouwwerken in Nederland en België, Arbeiderpers, Amsterdam, 1995
- Stewart, David. "Political Ruins: Gothic Sham Ruins and the '45." Journal of the Society of Architectural Historians. Vol. 55, No. 4 (Dec. 1996), pp. 400–411.
