= Forbidden Corner =

Tourist attraction in Yorkshire, England

The Forbidden Corner
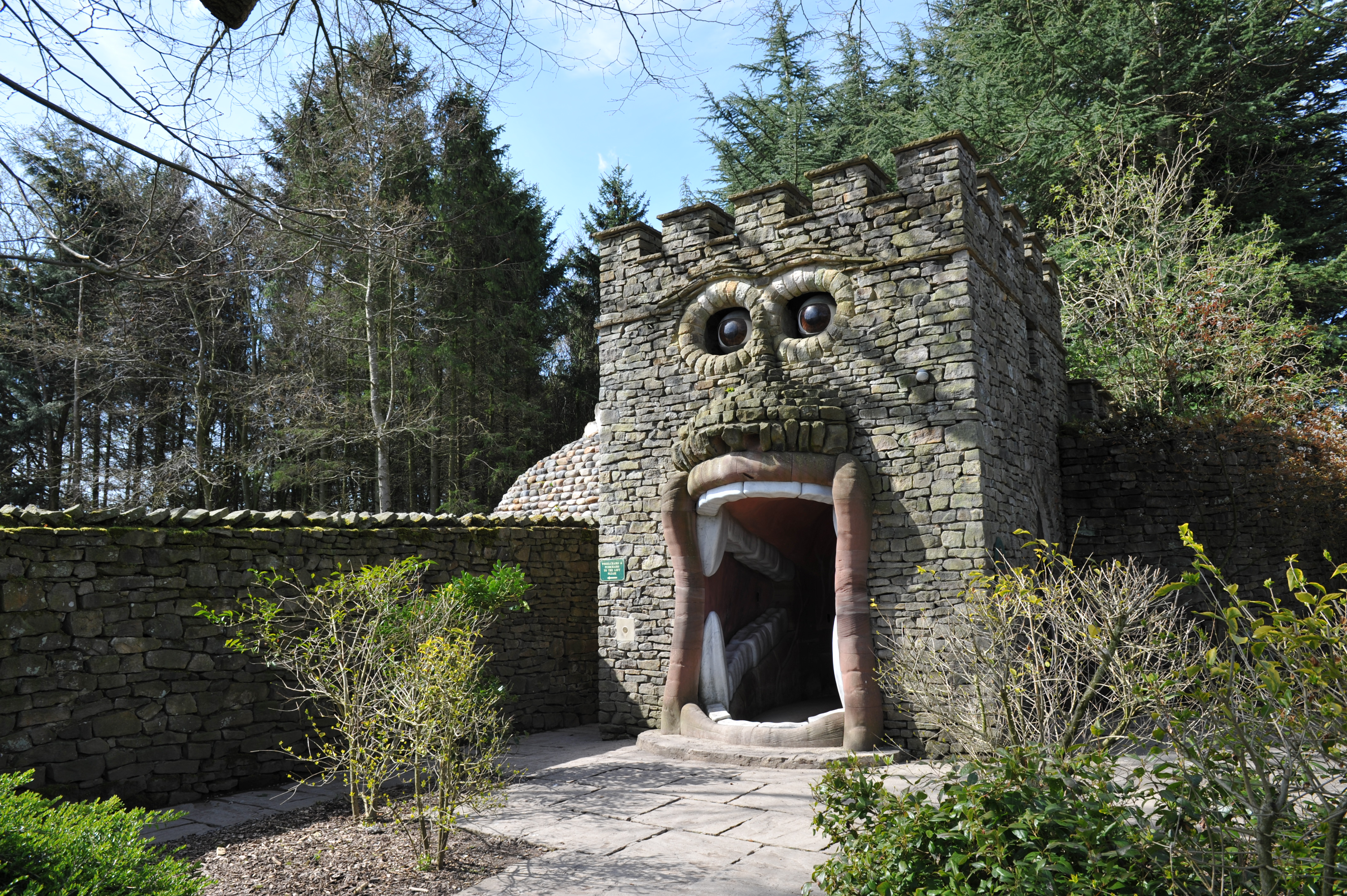
- The Facetower located at The Forbidden Corner
- Interactive map of The Forbidden Corner
- Location: North Yorkshire, England
- Coordinates: 54°16′33″N 1°51′25″W
- Owner: Tupgill Park Estate
- Slogan: The Strangest Place In The World
- Operating season: April to Christmas
- Area: 4 acres (1.6 ha)
- Website: Forbidden Corner

The Forbidden Corner is a folly garden located in the Tupgill Park Estate, at Coverham in Coverdale, in the Yorkshire Dales National Park, England. It is open to the public.

The folly garden is designed as a maze, with tunnels, grottoes, and novelty sculptures. The Folly Fellowship, a charity, voted it the best European folly from the 20th century.

First part of a private garden built in the 1980s, it was opened to the public in 1997 with an entrance fee. The gardens grew and by 2000 were widely visited and employed 25 people. There were concerns from planners at the National Park that the garden did not align with the aims of the park, and that the number of cars coming to visit was causing pollution. However, the park stayed open.

== History ==
It was built in the 1980s by the owner of Tupgill Park, Colin Armstrong, with architect Malcolm Tempest, as a private pleasure garden. The Armstrongs had been living at the estate since the Victorian era. Colin Armstrong is a British Consul based in Guayaquil in South America. It is based in the walled gardens of the 1,500 acres (600 ha) estate.

The garden was opened to the public in 1997, with a £4.50 entrance fee. However, planning permission for public use of the garden was not obtained at the time.

As of 2000, the gardens were visited by 80,000 people, and employed around 25 people.

Retrospective planning permission for the park was rejected in 2000. The National Park's planners raised concerns about the environmental impact and pollution of the large number of cars entering the Park to visit the garden, and that the garden did not agree with the aims of a national park. A petition to keep the park open was signed by 10,000 people. An enforcement order to remove the structures and close the site to the public was overturned on appeal in 2000, on condition of restricting the number of visitors entering the site to 120 per hour.

== Garden ==
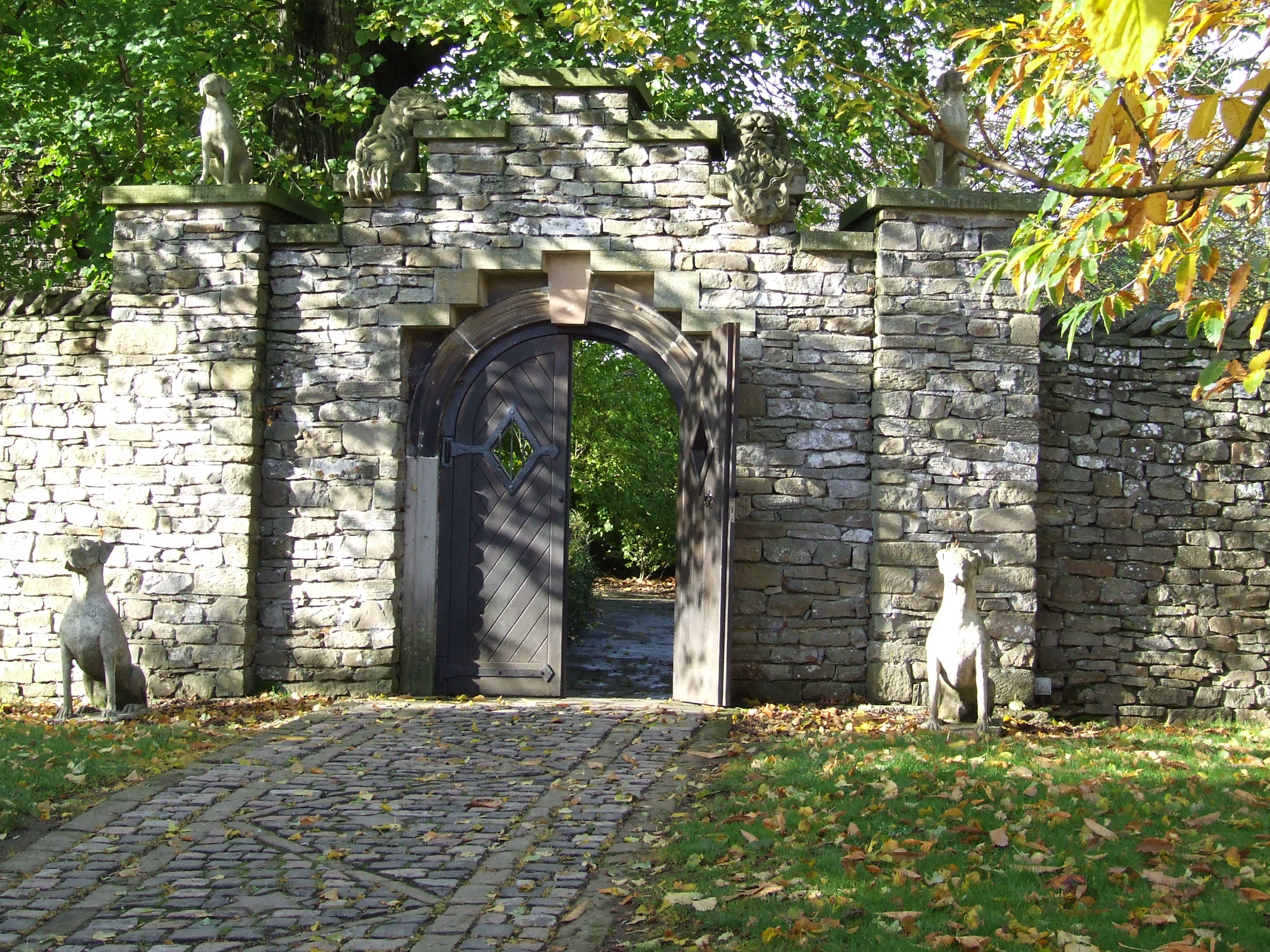
The entrance tower

The garden features statues, sculptures, towers, tunnels, a labyrinth (with revolving floor), a 12-foot (3.7 m) conifer dog's head, a 20-foot (6.1 m) oak green man, water fountains, as well as grottoes. It also has a café and gift shop. It covers 4 acres (1.6 ha).

It is set out as a maze, and visitors are given a checklist of things to find on their visit. A brass rubbing sheet is also available to complete, with 15 plaques hidden around the attraction.

The garden was voted the best European folly of the 20th century by the Folly Fellowship and best children's attraction in Yorkshire. It was rated as one of the top 10 follies by Huffington Post. Admission is by tickets pre-purchased online or pre-booked from an office in Middleham. As of 2024, the price for adults is £17.60, seniors £16.50, children £15.60 and a family (two adults and two children) £60.
