= Markham Le Fer Taylor =

- Born: 1837
- Died: 1910 (aged 72–73); Bath, Somerset
- Spouse: Frances Elizabeth Doyne
- Children: Eleanor Amelia Taylor, Philip Beauchamp Taylor, Herbert Wodehouse Taylor
- Military career
- Allegiance: United Kingdom
- Branch: British Army
- Service years: 1851 - ?
- Rank: Major General
- Unit: Royal Artillery
- Conflicts: Crimean War; Siege of Sevastopol
- Awards: Order of the Medjidie, 5th Class

Major General Markham Le Fer Taylor was a career officer of the British Army, serving in the Royal Artillery.

== Early life ==
Markham Le Fer Taylor was born in 1837, the son of Watkin Williams Taylor and Amelia Taylor.

== Military service ==
Taylor joined the military in 1851, being promoted from gentleman cadet to second lieutenant in the Royal Artillery on 29 December that year, and to lieutenant on 5 January 1854.

=== Crimean War ===
The 1859 Army List states that Taylor "served in 1855 in the trenches, with the siege train at the siege and fall of Sebastopol, and bombardments of 6th and 17th June and August."

On 2 March 1858, it was announced that as a consequence of their Crimean service a number of officers, Taylor among them, would be permitted by the British authorities to accept and wear the Imperial Order of the Medjidie, awarded by Ottoman Sultan Abdulmejid I. Taylor was awarded the 5th Class of this decoration.

Taylor was promoted to second captain on 26 October 1858, and between this time and July 1872 he was made captain, before being promoted to major on 5 July 1872. Further promotion to lieutenant colonel came on 1 July 1877, and to colonel on 1 July 1881.

== Later life and death ==
Taylor married Frances Elizabeth Doyne, (the daughter of Reverend John Doyne of Old Leighlin, Carlow) in Clifton, Bristol. They had three children, Eleanor Amelia Taylor, Philip Beauchamp Taylor and Captain Herbert Wodehouse Taylor, a casualty of the Boer War.

He died in Bath, where he had taken up residence, and is buried in Lansdown Cemetery with his wife. His son Herbert is also memorialised here, but is buried in Machadodorp Cemetery, Mpumalanga.
