= Sham Castle =

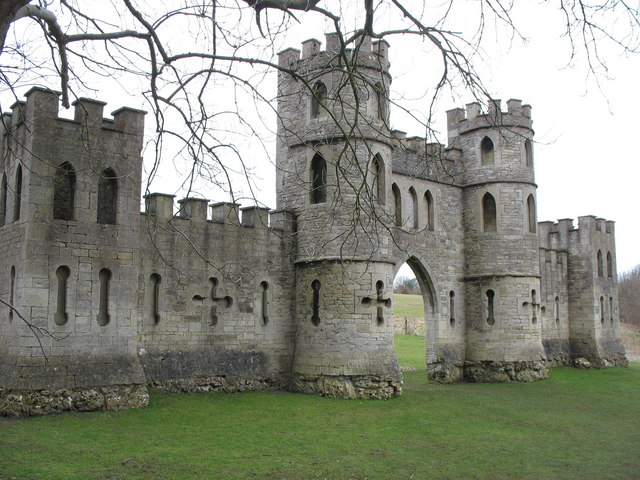

- Location within Somerset
- 51°22′57″N 2°20′15″W
- Location: Claverton Down, Somerset, England

History
- Built: 1762

Site notes
- Architect: Sanderson Miller

Listed Building – Grade II*
- Designated: 1 February 1956
- Reference no.: 1312449

Sham Castle is a folly on Claverton Down overlooking the city of Bath, Somerset, England. It is a Grade II* listed building. It is a screen wall with a central pointed arch flanked by two 3-storey circular turrets, which extend sideways to a 2-storey square tower at each end of the wall.

It was probably designed around 1755 by Sanderson Miller and built in 1762 by Richard James, master mason for Ralph Allen, "to improve the prospect" from Allen's town house in Bath.

Sham Castle is now illuminated at night.

== Generic term ==
Other 18th-century so-called "sham castles" exist at Hagley Hall, Clent Grove, Castle Hill, Filleigh and two at Croome Court (Dunstall and Pirton castles).

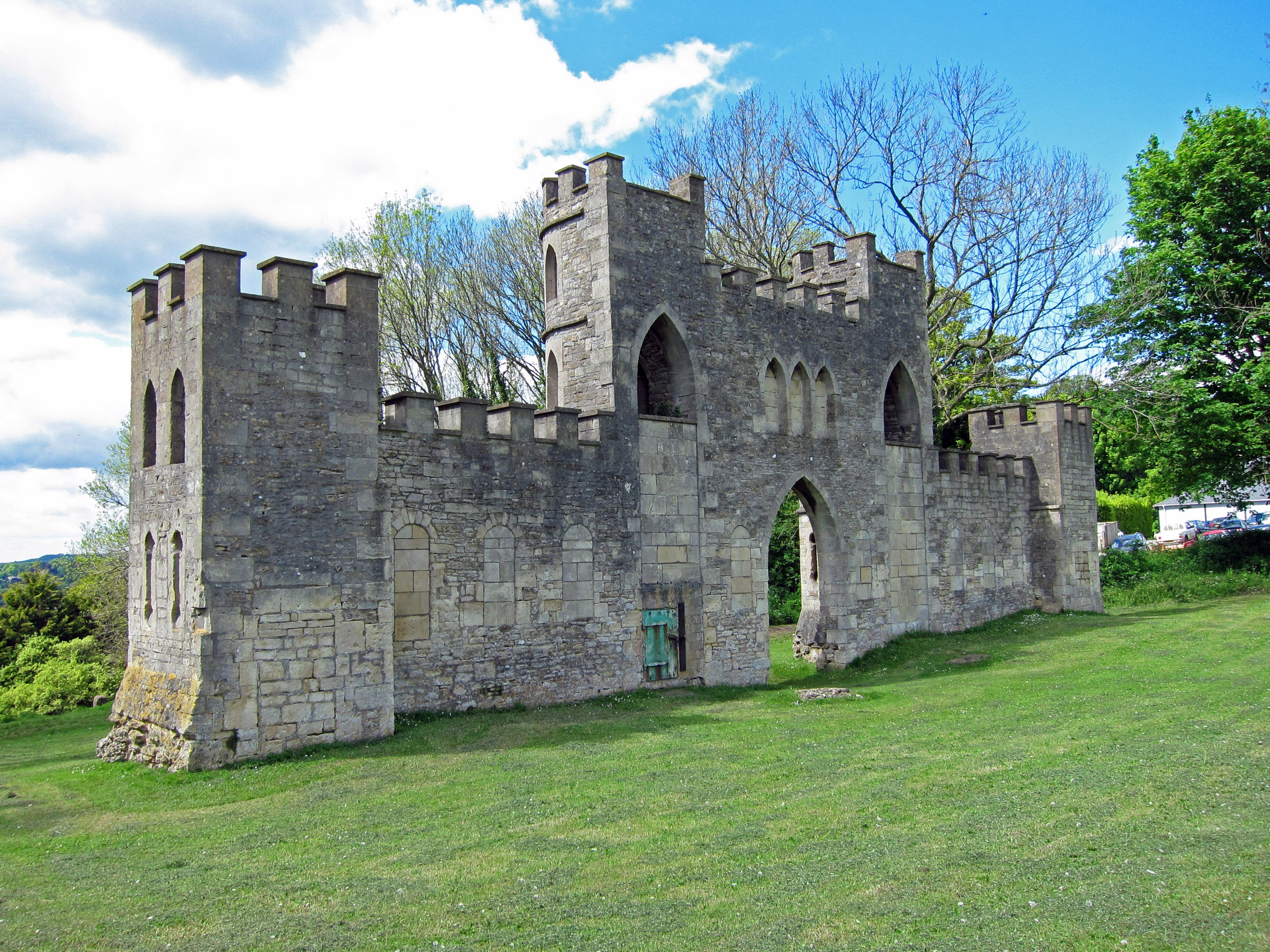
Rear view of Sham Castle, showing that the castle was intended to be viewed only from the front.

Ralph Allen's nearby Prior Park Landscape Garden is home to the Sham Bridge. This structure is likewise a screen at the end of the Serpentine Lake which appears to be a bridge. Much like the Sham Castle, it dates from the mid-18th century.

Another nearby folly castle is that of Midford Castle. Sham Castle is one of three follies overlooking Bath, the others being Beckford's Tower and Browne's Folly.

In Piltown, County Kilkenny, Ireland is a partially-built monument known as 'Sham Castle'. It was intended to commemorate someone believed to have died but who later turned up during construction.
