= Grottoes of Ferrand =

Grottoes in Saint-Hippolyte, France

- French: Grottes de Ferrand
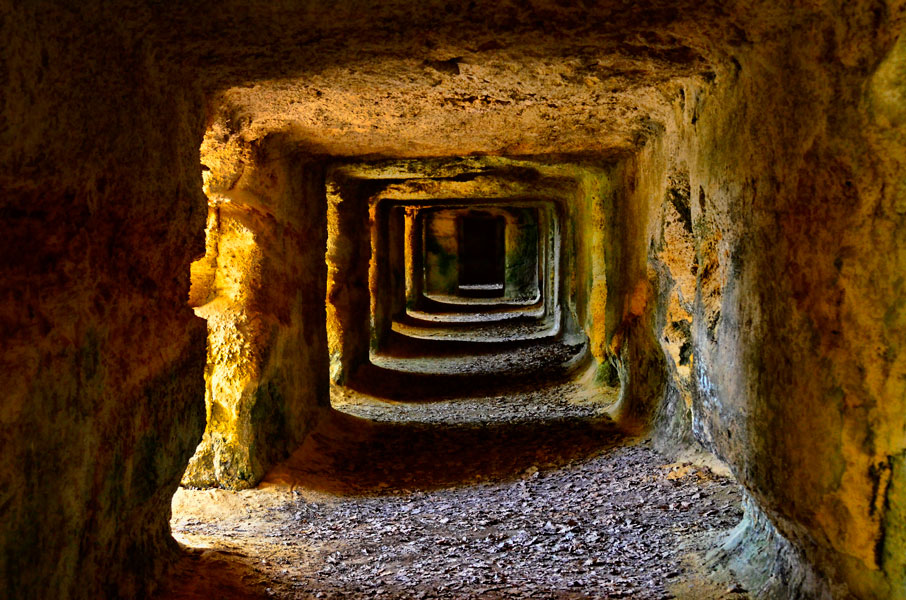
- Interactive map of Grottoes of Ferrand
- Location: Saint-Hippolyte, Gironde, France
- Coordinates: 44°52′53.9″N 0°07′25.4″W

The Grottoes of Ferrand (French: Grottes de Ferrand) are a series of 17th-century artificial grottoes on the estate of the Château de Ferrand in Saint-Hippolyte, Gironde, in southwestern France, near the town of Saint-Émilion.

Carved out of an escarpment hanging over the road to Saint-Étienne-de-Lisse, the grottoes were designed as a network of interconnected chambers. Originally a lavish folly furnished with salons, bedrooms, orangeries, and shrines to mythic and political figures, the grottoes have long since been plundered and abandoned.

== History ==
The grottoes were designed and commissioned by Élie de Bétoulaud (1638/9–1709), seigneur of Saint-Pauly, Ferrand, and Jaugue-Blanc, a lawyer and poet who used the pen name “Damon.” Bétoulaud was connected to the literary set known as the précieuses, whom he met at “Les samedis de Sapho," the influential Paris salon held by his intimate friend Madeleine de Scudéry. Bétoulaud, who never married, built one of the grottoes' two labyrinths in honor of Scudéry.

Grottoes figured prominently in the literary imagination of the précieuses. Like many aristocrats of the period, Bétoulaud was influenced by Honoré d'Urfé's six-part pastoral romance L'Astrée, in which a shepherd named Céladon retreats to a cavern to write love letters to the titular shepherdess. Grottoes also appear in Scudéry's novels Clélie and Artamène. Scudéry describes the Grottoes of Ferrand at length in Nouvelles conversations de morale (1684), in which the character Céphise and her companions visit Damon's “hermitage” near Saint-Émilion where he lives “surrounded by the Muses.”

In his 1705 will, Bétoulaud ordered that his heirs "be bound to use the sum of thirty pounds each year for the cleanliness and upkeep of the magnificent grottoes that I hollowed out as an eternal monument to the glory of King Louis the Great, in the rocks close to the aforementioned house of Ferrand."

Bétoulaud's heirs neglected the grottoes after his death, and they were gradually forgotten. The busts, seashells, and other décor disappeared, perhaps during the French Revolution, when much of the property of Bétoulaud's descendants was confiscated. Visitors gradually covered the walls with inscriptions, some of which suggest the abandoned grottoes may have been commonly used for clandestine lovers' trysts.

The original purpose of the grottoes was rediscovered in 1868 by the archaeologist Émilien Piganeau, who learned of them from a local farmer. Piganeau initially conjectured that the local name for the caves, "the Grotto of the Druids" (La grotte des Druides), was a folk memory of a subterranean Celtic temple.

== Design ==
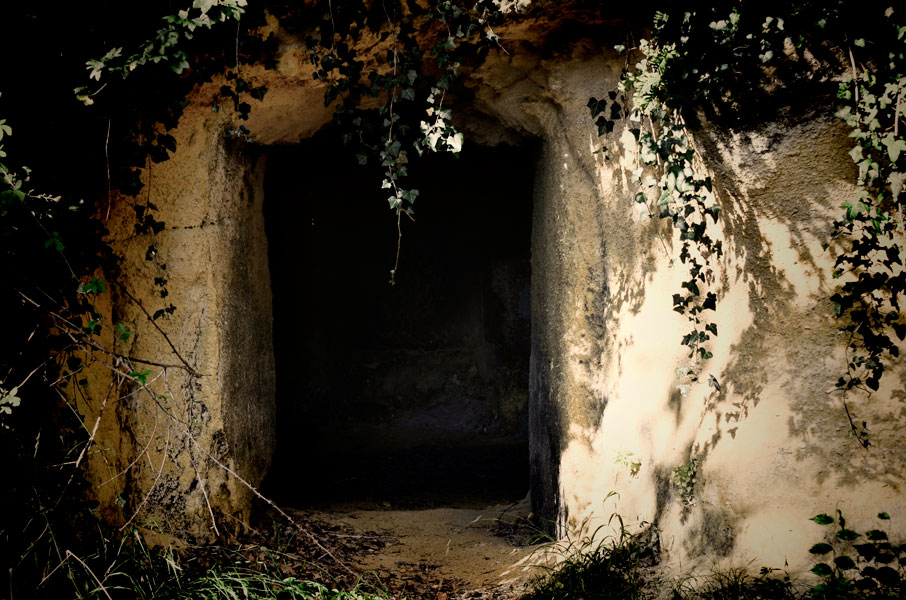
An entrance to one of the grottoes' chambers.

According to a manuscript written by Bétoulaud titled Description des Grottes ou du Labyrinthe de Damon, the path to the grottoes was originally marked by a "small terrace balustraded in the half-round," which opened onto an entrance grotto. The entrance grotto led to a second terrace where Bétoulaud had created two oval cabinets de verdure (enclosed "rooms" cut from the surrounding foliage) looking over a semicircular pool of water, which was fed by a fountain streaming from an overhanging rock. From each side of this second terrace, four paths led to two iron doors (no longer extant), each of which opened onto a symmetrical labyrinth. The two labyrinths were dedicated, respectively, to "Sappho" (a pseudonym of Scudéry's) and the king of France, Louis XIV.

Two galleries, 8 feet high and 6 feet wide, with arcades once lined with silver-plated seashells, lead 30 feet into the rock. In each room niches are carved out where Bétoulaud had placed orange trees and, on pilasters, busts of heroes and gods: Mars, Hercules, Flora, Diana, Julius Caesar, Augustus, and Louis XIV, each surrounded by pink seashells, "so well that this harmonious mixture of white busts, greenish rock, silver-plated and pink or black-flecked seashells, and green orange trees laden with flowers and fruits surprises and immediately strikes those who don't expect, upon entering this place, so much order inside a rock."

A last grotto in the west, containing a bed, was not mentioned in Bétoulaud's description, and is believed to have been a lovers' bedchamber.

=== The Sappho labyrinth ===
At the entrance to the Sappho labyrinth is the inscription: Et mvsis et otio ("To the muses and leisure"). A large salon, marked by four pilasters cut into the rock, was once festooned with silver-plated shells. At the end of the salon, a bed decorated with seashells and corals once stood by the square window. In a second salon dedicated more specifically to Scudéry (who never visited), the mouldings were decorated by imported snailshells, tiger cowries, serpentinite marble, alabaster, mother-of-pearl, crystal, and porcelain. These decorations have not survived.

The third room, containing chairs set on two separate levels, was designed to represent a moral: "He who lowers himself sees only sky, and he who elevates himself sees only earth." At the far end of the labyrinth is a lyre-shaped room, which Bétoulaud called the "lyric grotto," and a chamber with three bedlike seats.

=== The Louis XIV labyrinth ===
The doorway to the left labyrinth is inscribed, Et virt aetern Ludovici magni ("To the eternal virtue of Louis the Great"). In the salon, a square window to the exterior projected light through an oval opening to the rock onto a bas-relief of the king, no longer visible, which was once surrounded by silver-plated shells. A gallery, once planted with orange trees, leads to a corridor that connects the two labyrinths. The two far walls of the gallery are pierced with small holes in the shape of two interlaced uppercase Ls, which would be illuminated by the sun coming through the grotto's windows.

Scudéry's book mentions an aviary of canaries "who made a delicious concert," though this detail may have been a fictional embellishment.
