= Saint-Hippolyte, Gironde =

Saint-Hippolyte
- Commune
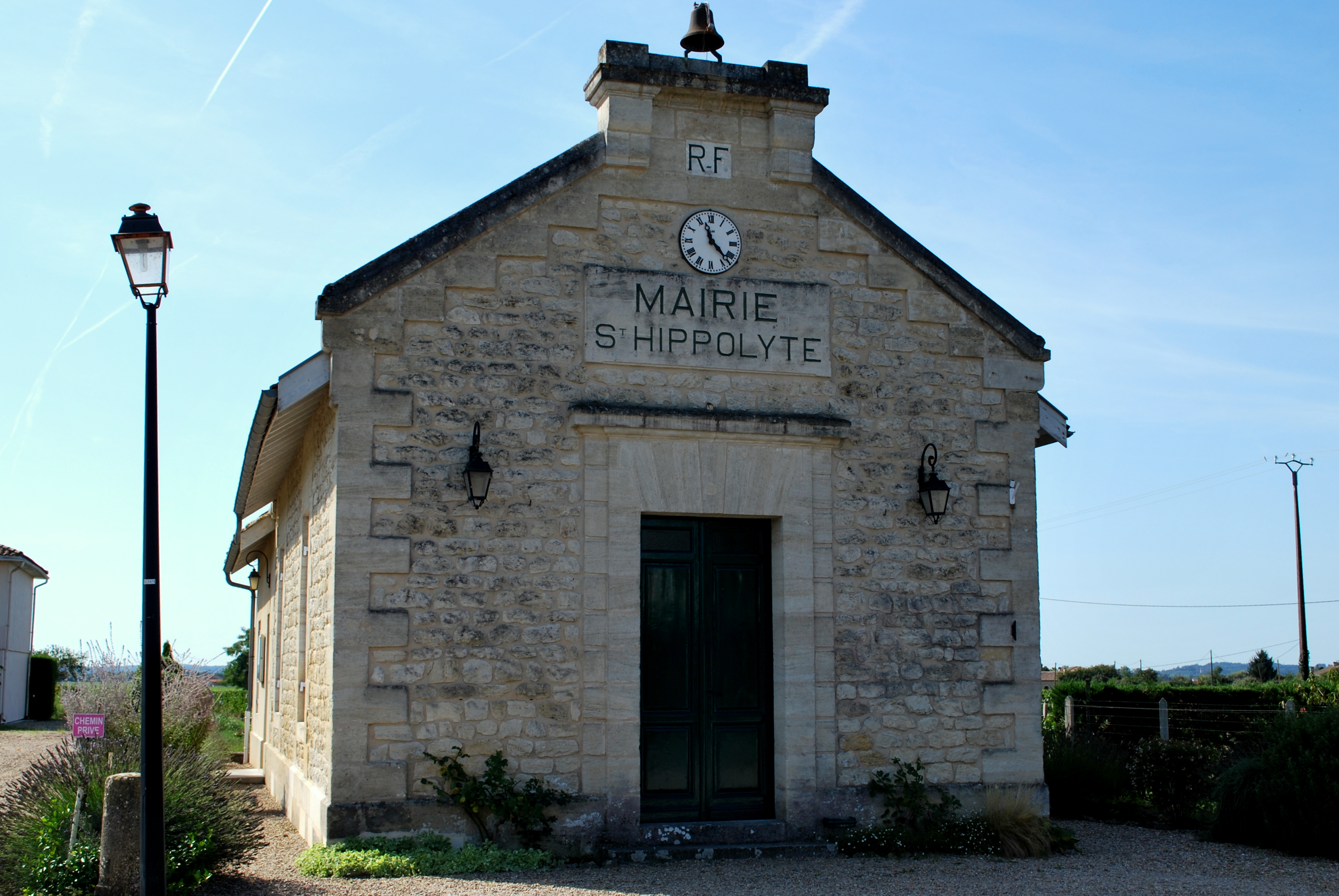
- The town hall in Saint-Hippolyte
- Location of Saint-Hippolyte
- Location within France Location within Nouvelle-Aquitaine
- Coordinates: 44°52′20″N 0°07′32″W
- Country: France
- Region: Nouvelle-Aquitaine
- Department: Gironde
- Arrondissement: Libourne
- Canton: Les Coteaux de Dordogne
- Intercommunality: CC du Grand Saint-Émilionnais

Government
  - Mayor (2020–2026): Gérard Canuel
- Area^{1}: 4.45 km^{2} (1.72 sq mi)
- Elevation: 18 m (59 ft)
- Highest elevation: 101 m (331 ft)
- Lowest elevation: 9 m (30 ft)
- Population (2023): 118
  - Density: 26.5/km^{2} (68.7/sq mi)
- Demonym: Saint-Hippolytains
- Time zone: UTC+01:00 (CET)
  - Summer (DST): UTC+02:00 (CEST)
- INSEE/Postal code: 33420 /33330
- ^{1} French Land Register data, which excludes lakes, ponds, glaciers > 1 km^{2} (0.386 sq mi or 247 acres) and river estuaries.

Saint-Hippolyte (French pronunciation: [sɛ̃.t‿ipɔlit]; Gascon: Sent Pòlit) is a commune in the Gironde department in Nouvelle-Aquitaine in Southwestern France.

The 17th-century Grottoes of Ferrand are located in the commune, on the grounds of the wine-producing Château de Ferrand.

== Population ==
Historical population
Year	Pop.	±% p.a.
1968	271	—
1975	291	+1.02%
1982	277	−0.70%
1990	234	−2.09%
1999	209	−1.25%
2007	170	−2.55%
2012	151	−2.34%
2017	134	−2.36%
2023	118	−2.10%
Source: INSEE

== See also ==
- Communes of the Gironde department
