= Beckford's Tower =

Architectural folly near Bath, England

- Lansdown Tower
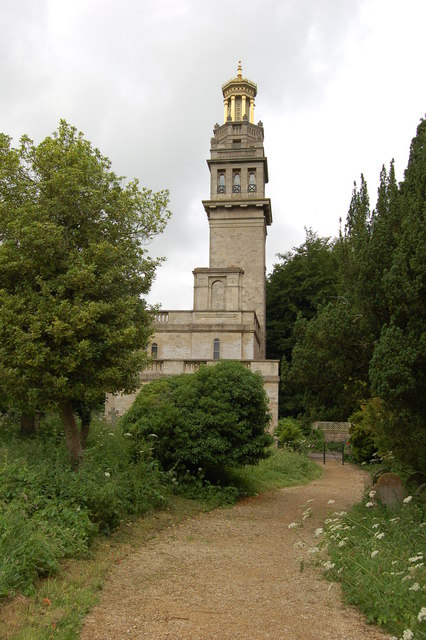
- Beckford's Tower with part of the surrounding cemetery

- Location within Somerset
- 51.4064°N 2.3789°W
- Location: Lansdown Hill, Bath, Somerset, England

History
- Built: 1827
- Built for: William Thomas Beckford

Site notes
- Height: 154 feet (47 m)
- Architect: Henry Goodridge
- Restored: 1972 (house), 1997-2000 (tower)
- Restored by: J. Owen Williams (house), Caroe & Partners, Mann Williams Structural Engineers (tower)
- Owner: The Beckford Tower Trust (Bath Preservation Trust)

Listed Building – Grade I
- Official name: Beckford's Tower, with attached wall and railings
- Designated: 11 August 1972
- Reference no.: 1394133

National Register of Historic Parks and Gardens
- Official name: Lansdown Cemetery and Beckford's Tower
- Designated: 30 April 1987
- Reference no.: 1000563

Beckford's Tower, originally known as Lansdown Tower, is an architectural folly built in neo-classical style on Lansdown Hill, just outside Bath, Somerset, England. The tower and its attached railings are designated as a Grade I listed building. Along with the adjoining Lansdown Cemetery it is Grade II listed on the Register of Historic Parks and Gardens of special historic interest in England.

The tower was built for William Thomas Beckford, a wealthy novelist, art collector and critic, to designs by Henry Goodridge, and was completed in 1827. Beckford used it as a library and a retreat, with the cupola at the top acting as a belvedere providing views over the surrounding countryside. The Italianate building at the base of the tower housed drawing rooms and a library. Extensive grounds between Beckford's house in Lansdown Crescent and the tower were landscaped and planted to create Beckford's Ride.

Following Beckford's death in 1844, the tower and lands were donated to Walcot parish and a burial ground created, with the Scarlet Drawing Room being converted into a chapel. In 1931 the house and tower were damaged by a fire and a public appeal was made for funds for its restoration. The cemetery closed in 1992 and the next year the site was bought by the Bath Preservation Trust who have carried out extensive renovation. It is now home to a museum displaying furniture originally made for the tower and paintings, prints and objects illustrating Beckford's life as a writer, collector and patron of the arts.

William Beckford's ability to build, and to collect, was made possible by the wealth he inherited, and continued to accumulate, as an owner of plantations and enslaved people, and latterly through the compensation he received from the government following the abolition of slavery; these conditions, events, and both the historical and particular contexts, are considered within the displays accompanying exhibits at The Beckford Tower Museum .

== History ==
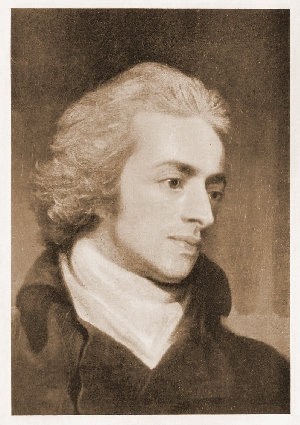
William Thomas Beckford (1760–1844)

Beckford's Tower in Lansdown, overlooking the city of Bath, was completed in 1827 for wealthy local resident William Beckford, to a design by Bath architect Henry Goodridge. Beckford was a member of the influential Beckford family. He was a novelist, an art collector and patron of works of decorative art, a critic, travel writer and sometime politician, reputed at one stage to be the richest commoner in England. In 1822 he sold Fonthill Abbey, and a large part of his art collection, to John Farquhar for £330,000, and moved to Bath, where he bought No. 20 Lansdown Crescent and No. 1 Lansdown Place West, joining them with a one-storey arch thrown across a driveway. In 1836 he also bought Nos. 18 and 19 Lansdown Crescent.

Located at the end of pleasure gardens called Beckford's Ride which ran from his house in Lansdown Crescent all the way north to the tower at the top of Lansdown Hill, Beckford used the monument as both a library and a retreat. He also made it his habit to ride up to the tower to view the progress of gardens and works, then walk back down to Lansdown Crescent for breakfast. From the top of the tower, with a strong spyglass, Beckford could make out shipping in the Bristol Channel. Beckford wished that he had built the tower forty feet higher and admitted: "such as it is, it is a famous landmark for drunken farmers on their way home from market".

Beckford's own choice of the best of works of art, vertu, books and prints, as well as the rich furnishings from Fonthill Abbey, were rehoused in his adjoining houses in Lansdown Crescent, Bath and at the tower. One long narrow room in the tower was fitted out as an "oratory", where the paintings were all of devotional subjects and a marble Virgin and Child stood bathed in light from a hidden skylight. In 1841 some of the contents of the tower were sold during a two-day sale and the rooms refurnished.

=== Later owners ===
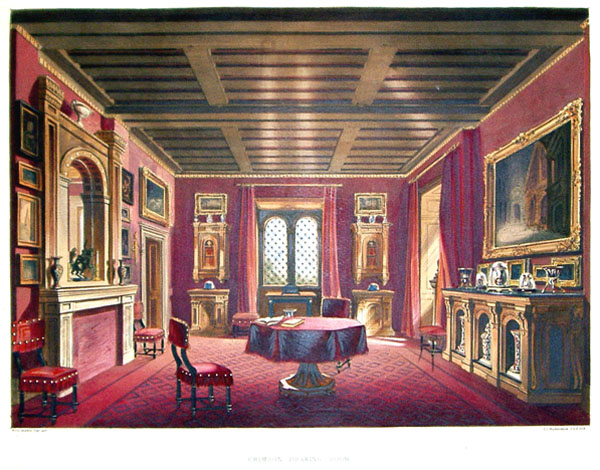
A chromolith by Willis Maddox of the Crimson Drawing Room at Beckford's Tower. First published in English's Views of Lansdown Tower (1844)

After Beckford's death on 2 May 1844 his younger daughter Susan Euphemia Beckford, wife of Alexander Hamilton, 10th Duke of Hamilton, removed the books and greatest treasures to Hamilton Palace and the tower was put up for sale. It failed to reach its reserve, however. In 1847 the tower was sold for £1,000 to a local publican who turned it into a beer garden. Eventually it was re-purchased by Beckford's daughter, who gave the surrounding land to Walcot parish for consecration as a cemetery in 1848. This enabled the return of Beckford's body from his tomb in Bath Abbey Cemetery, Lyncombe Vale (off Ralph Allen Drive) for reburial near the tower as he had originally wished. His self-designed tomb – a massive sarcophagus of polished pink granite with bronze armorial plaques – stands on a hillock in the cemetery surrounded by an oval ditch and ha-ha. On one side is a quotation from his Gothic novel Vathek: "Enjoying humbly the most precious gift of heaven to man – Hope"; and on another these lines from his poem, A Prayer: "Eternal Power! Grant me, through obvious clouds one transient gleam Of thy bright essence in my dying hour." The Scarlet Drawing Room was converted into a chapel in 1848 to serve the cemetery. In 1864 the Rector of Walcot gave £100 for the repair of tower stonework and in 1884 a similar amount of money for further repairs to the upper part of the tower, but the condition of the stonework was deteriorating by 1898 and described in 1918 as "piteous and dilapidated".

In 1931 an unexplained fire destroyed much of the interior of the house, which had been turned into a cemetery chapel. The local fire brigade managed to stop the fire reaching the wooden stairs to the top of the tower. Prebendary F. E. Murphy, the rector of Walcot, established an appeal for funds of £300 for the restoration. By 1954 the stairs up the tower had become unsafe and a further appeal for public funds for the restoration was started. In 1970 the Church Commissioners declared the chapel redundant and plans were drawn up by the new owners, Dr and Mrs Hilliard, to renovate the tower and create two flats. In 1972 the tower was designated as a Grade I listed building. The Beckford Tower Trust and the museum were established in 1977.

=== Bath Preservation Trust ===
Since 1993 the tower has been owned by the Bath Preservation Trust and managed by its subsidiary, The Beckford Tower Trust, a registered charity. The tower was restored in 1995 and was opened to the public in 2001. The ground floor of the tower is available to rent through the Landmark Trust as a holiday home.

In 2019, Historic England placed the tower on their Heritage at Risk Register as it was suffering from water penetration. In the same year, Bath Preservation Trust announced it was raising funds for a £3 million project to restore the tower and surroundings, including the grotto tunnel, and increase public engagement. An initial £390,900 was received from the National Lottery Heritage Fund in December 2019, and the trust was able to buy the site, of about 2.5 acres, in 2021. In September 2022, a £3 million grant from the National Lottery Heritage Fund was confirmed, reaching the then fundraising target of £3.9 million. The tower and museum reopened on completion of the work in June 2024.

== Architecture ==
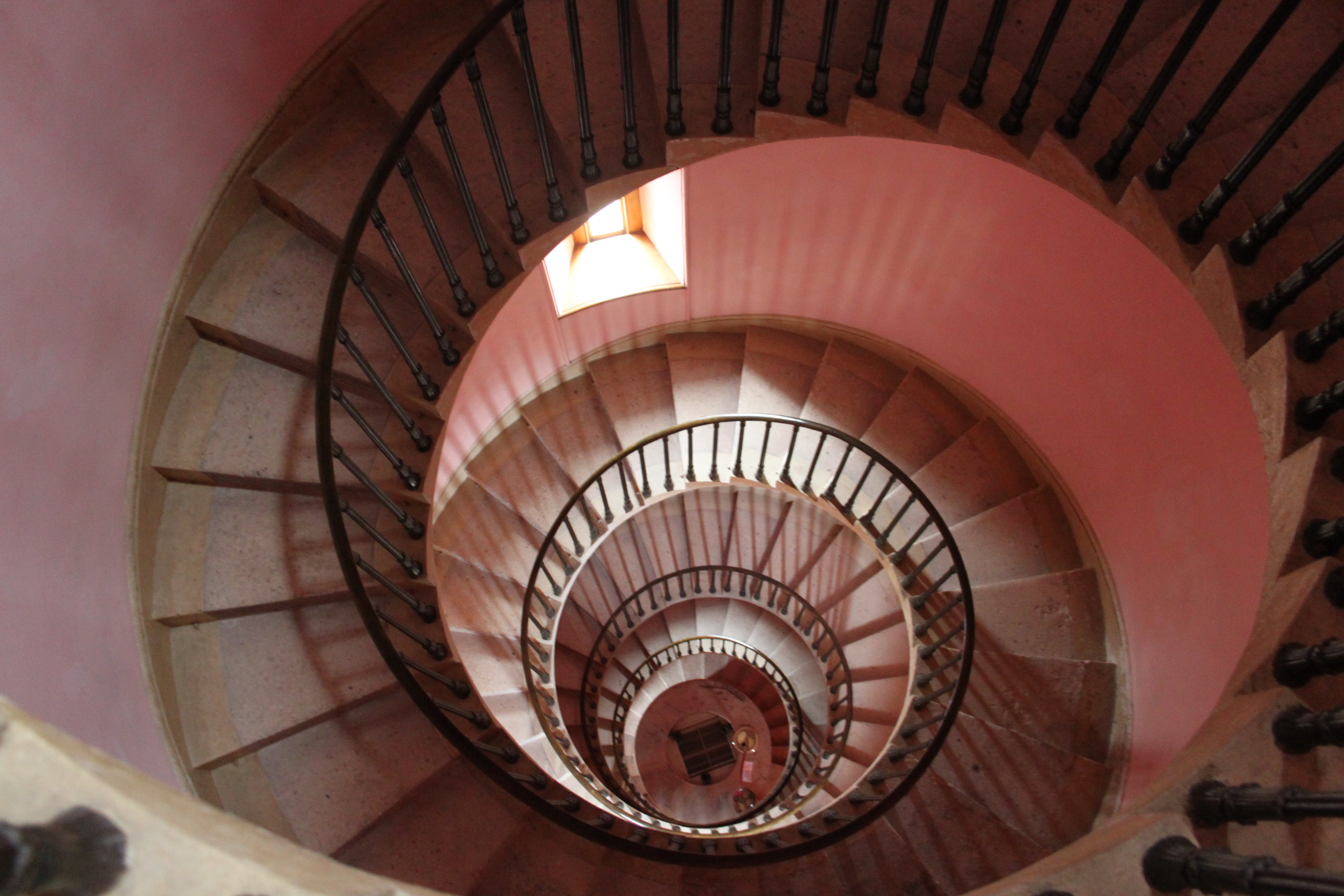
The spiral staircase

Standing 154 feet (47 m) high, the tower has three stages. The first stage is square with small windows and terminates in a Doric entablature and cornice. The second stage has plain square piers forming three openings with recessed arches. The tower is topped by a gilded lantern (or belvedere), based on the peripteral temple at Tivoli and the Tower of the Winds at Athens. The octagonal belvedere has a cast iron roof supported by eight columns. A stone spiral cantilevered staircase leads to the 53 wooden stairs giving access to the cupola at the summit. At the base of the tower was a furnace and pump which sent warm air up through the structure.

Below the tower is an Italianate building. On the ground floor was the Scarlet Drawing Room and a vestibule with an annexe which housed a kitchen and offices. The first floor held the Crimson Drawing Room, sanctuary and library.

== Cemetery and grounds ==
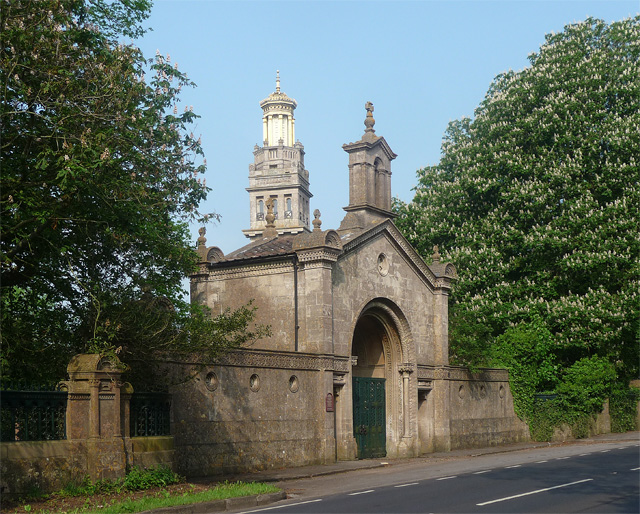
The entrance gateway with the top of the tower in the background

From Beckford's house in Lansdown Crescent to the tower, a series of interlinked gardens were laid out which became known as Beckford's Ride. Nearest the crescent was a terraced Italianate garden and then a plantation of conifers. Above the plantation was a quarry garden and dyke garden; a grotto tunnel under a track led into the tower garden. Specialist planting included Pinus arborea, Royal Fern (Osmunda regalis) and Cistus alpina, in order to encourage bird species including nightingales, linnets and thrushes. The old quarry was made into a walled garden with fruit and vegetables.

Henry Goodridge designed a Byzantine entrance gateway to the grounds. Bronze railings were later added which had surrounded Beckford's original tomb in Bath Abbey Cemetery. The railings were removed during World War II and replaced in 2000. The gardens were surrounded by stone walls around 2 metres (6 ft 7 in) high.

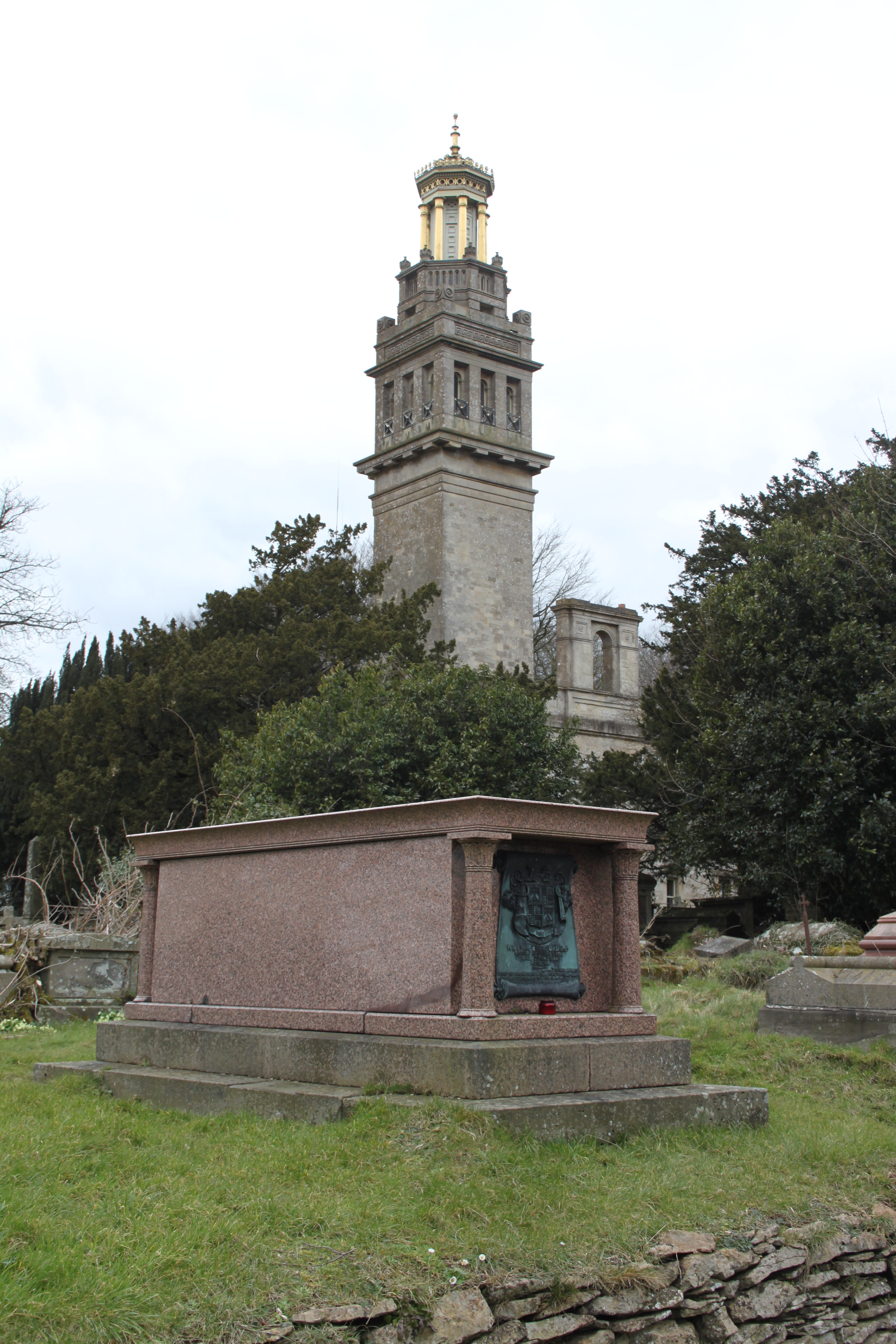
Beckford's tomb in front of the tower

Part of the grounds were donated to the local parish after Beckford's death and consecrated as a cemetery in 1848. It became known as Lansdown Cemetery and burial plots were laid out in a grid pattern. It was extended in 1947 and again in 1961. In addition to Beckford's tomb, the cemetery is also the burial site for several notable people from Bath, including Henry Goodridge, Field Marshall William Rowan, the Holburne family who founded the Holburne Museum, Anne (the wife of Sir Richard Bickerton, 2nd Baronet) and the feminist writer Sarah Grand. The cemetery also contains six Commonwealth war graves of British service personnel, four from World War I and two from World War II, the latter including a Czech airman serving with the Royal Air Force.

The cemetery closed in 1992 and since then has been maintained by the local council and the Lansdown Cemetery Trust.

== Museum ==
The tower houses a museum displaying furniture originally made for the tower, alongside paintings, prints and objects illustrating William Beckford's life as a writer, collector and patron of the arts. Visitors can climb the spiral staircase to the restored belvedere below the lantern and experience panoramic views of the surrounding countryside.

== See also ==
- Sham Castle, another folly overlooking Bath
- Browne's Folly, another folly overlooking Bath

== Bibliography ==
- Benjamin, Lewis Saul (1910). The life and letters of William Beckford of Fonthill. Duffield.
- Bond, James (1998). Somerset Parks and Gardens. Somerset Books. ISBN 978-0-86183-465-5.
- Crathorne, James (1998). The Royal Crescent Book of Bath. Collins & Brown. ISBN 978-1855854987.
- Forsyth, Michael (2003). Pevsner Architectural Guides: Bath. Yale University Press. ISBN 978-0300101775.
- Haddon, John (1982). Portrait of Bath. Robert Hale. ISBN 978-0709198833.
- Jenkins, Simon (2005). Discover Britain's Historic Houses: West Country. Reader's Digest. p. 138. ISBN 9780276440670.
- Millington, Jon (2002). Beckford's Tower, Bath: An Illustrated Guide (7 ed.). Bath Preservation Trust. ISBN 978-1898954903.
- Mowl, Tomothy; Mako, Marion (2010). Historic Gardens of Somerset. Redcliffe. ISBN 9781906593568.
- Ostergard, Derek E., ed. (2001). William Beckford 1760-1844: An Eye for the Magnificent. Yale University Press. ISBN 978-0-300-09068-0.
