= Browne's Folly (tower) =

Tower in Somerset, England

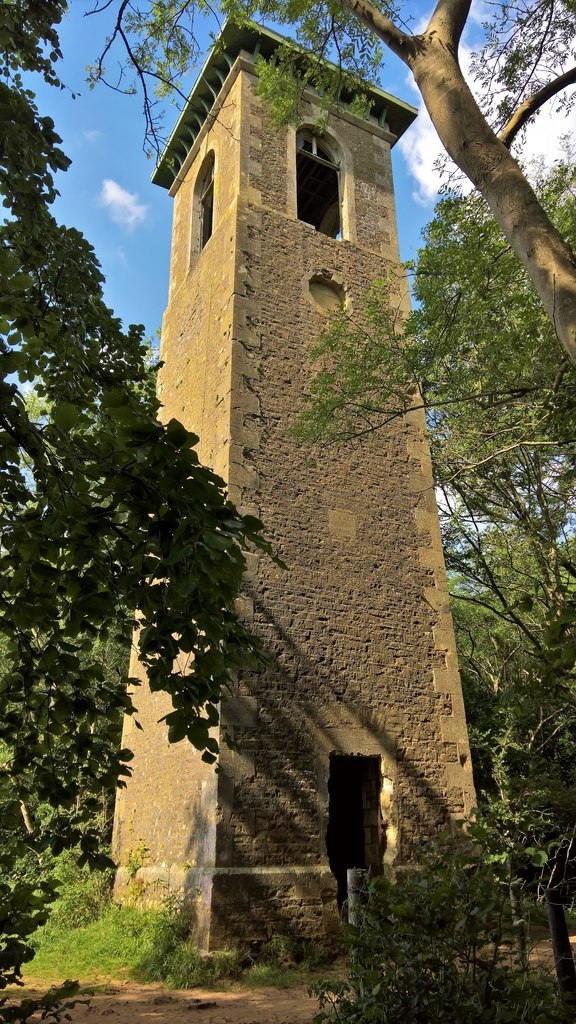
- The Folly was once a prominent feature of the area, but has become obscured by the surrounding woodland
- Interactive map of Browne's Folly
- 51°23′36″N 2°17′47″W
- Location: Bathford

History
- Built: 1845

Site notes
- Height: Approx. 12 metres (39 ft)

Listed Building – Grade II
- Official name: Brown's Folly
- Designated: 14 June 1988
- Reference no.: 1021829

Browne's Folly is a folly tower on the Farleigh Rise near the village of Bathford in Somerset, England. The Folly was designated a Grade II listed building in 1988. It gave its name to Brown's Folly, a 100 acre Site of Special Scientific Interest, notified in 1974.

== History ==
The tower was built in 1845 by Colonel Wade Browne, the squire of Monkton Farleigh Manor, to provide employment during an agricultural recession. It replaced a semaphore tower which had previously stood on the site. In 1907 the tower was renovated by the owner of the estate, Charles Hobhouse, who had his shooting parties meet at the tower. Demolition was suggested in 1938 but did not take place.

A depiction of the Folly appears on the unofficial coat of arms of Bathford Parish Council.

== Structure ==
The tower is made of coursed rubble stone, has a square plan and tapers as it rises. Inside, there is a spiral staircase in some degree of disrepair and with no handrail. The upper stage has round-arched openings but the balustraded handrails are missing the entire way up the staircase. The Folly is structurally sound. While dangerous to climb, the tower is currently open to the public. Since 1998 it has been maintained by the Folly Fellowship, which replaced the roof.
