= Folly Fellowship =

UK charity

The Folly Fellowship is a UK charity and company limited by guarantee. It was created in 1988 by Gwyn Headley, Wim Meulenkamp and Andrew Plumridge as an amenity society to protect, preserve and promote awareness of Britain's follies, grottoes and garden buildings. It organises trips throughout the year to follies and holds an annual garden party at a follies garden where the highlight is the cutting of a cake formed in the shape of one of the follies in the garden. Members also receive a range of publications, including three magazines, each giving information about follies in different depths. Folly Fellowship members include architects, people who live in follies, people who build follies and other interested persons.

The Folly Fellowship has recorded around 1,800 follies and grottoes. It maintains a substantial library of books and papers, a slide collection, and a collection of measured surveys of many follies. They believe that it is difficult to draw a line between architectural extravagance and "true folly", and that a builder does not intend to craft a folly. Even Lord Berners commented of his tower at Faringdon: "The great point of this tower, is that it will be entirely useless", but the distinction of 'folly' was awarded later by others.

The Fellowship is regarded as an authority on follies. They are also the caretakers of some notable follies.

== Sources ==
- The folly of others - The Times October 6, 2007
- Fabulous Follies - BBC Countryfile Nov 7 2007
