= Swineside =

Hamlet in North Yorkshire, England

- Hamlet
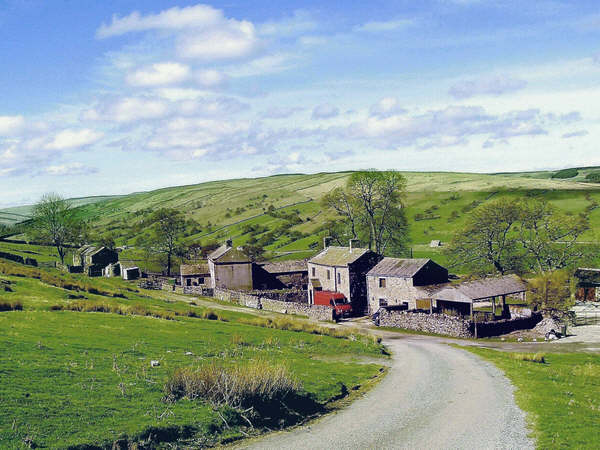
- The small hamlet of Swineside in Coverdale
- Etymology: Pig pasture
- Location within North Yorkshire
- Coordinates: 54.237084°N 1.9057472°W
- Country: England
- English region: Yorkshire and the Humber
- County: North Yorkshire
- Civil parish: Carlton Highdale
- Elevation: 311 m (1,020 ft)
- Time zone: UTC00:00
- Post Code: DL8
- IPN Number: IPN0068853

Swineside is a hamlet in the parish of Carlton Highdale, in Coverdale, North Yorkshire, England. The hamlet is in the Yorkshire Dales, and is located on the right bank (looking downstream) of the River Cover, in a side dale of Wensleydale. The hamlet used to have a pottery and also a lead mine was located near to the settlement.

== History ==
The first mention of the hamlet is in 1240 when it is recorded as Swinesate. The first part is from Old English swin, meaning swine (pigs), and the second part is from Old Norse sætr meaning pasture. Locally, the feeling is that the first part of the name is actually an Old Norse personal name, Sven (so Sven's pasture), but in their book about Wensleydale (Coverdale is a side dale of Wensleydale), Pontefract and Hartley point out that before sheep farming, the dale was largely involved in pig-farming, hence the name deriving from swine.

In 1270, the settlement was referred to as Swinesate-in-Coverdale when lands were being apportioned, and later still, appeared in documents as Swyneside. In the 15th century, the land in and around the hamlet belonged to the Lord of Middleham, who granted it to the monks of Coverham Abbey in 1404/1405. By 1480, the monks had installed their Bailiff, Edward Loftus, at Swineside. Over fifty years later, Loftus moved into Coverham in 1536 at the time of the Dissolution, but members of the Loftus family remained in Swineside until at least 1570.

After the Dissolution of the Monasteries, the land in Coverdale was granted to the Earl and Countess of Wessex. A lead mine operated to the north-west of the village, and although dates are unclear, it is believed to have operated from the late seventeenth-century as an entry in the Calendar of Treasury Books, Volume 8, 1685-1689 states that ".. he had a reference from the late King for some mines in Swineside, in Coverdale [Coverham] co. Yorks." The hamlet was the original location of Swineside Ceramics, a company known for producing novelty teapots, until the premises at Swineside were not big enough for business, prompting a move to Leyburn in 1984. The company is most famous for producing the teapots given out as prizes on the television programme Countdown.

The hamlet is in the civil parish of Carlton Highdale (formerly a township), 1-mile (1.6 km) south-west of West Scrafton, 6 miles (10 km) from Middleham, and 8 miles (13 km) from Leyburn. Historically, Swineside was in the Ecclesiastical parish of Coverham, the wapentake of Hang West and the rural district of Leyburn; in 1974, it was moved from the old county of the North Riding of Yorkshire, into the Richmondshire District of North Yorkshire. In 2023, the former North Yorkshire districts were amalgamated into one unitary authority. East of the hamlet is Swineside Moor, over 90 acres (36 ha) of common land. The area was determined to be common land in 1977, when an inquiry was held to see who owned the land, but no-one came forward with evidence of ownership. The hamlet stands on the east bank of the River Cover (looking downstream).

There is one listed building in the hamlet, Middle House, which has "..quoins, which to left stick out as though to connect with adjacent building." The hamlet used to have a small seven-bedroomed hotel (the Coverdale Country Hotel), but this was converted into a private dwelling in 2011.

== Notable people ==
- John Bowes, preacher, was born in the hamlet
- Adam Loftus, priest, became Church of Ireland Archbishop of Dublin and Lord Chancellor of Ireland

== See also ==
- Listed buildings in Carlton Highdale
