= St Botolph's Church, Horsehouse =

Church in Horsehouse, North Yorkshire, England

Coordinates: 54°13′37″N 1°55′45″W

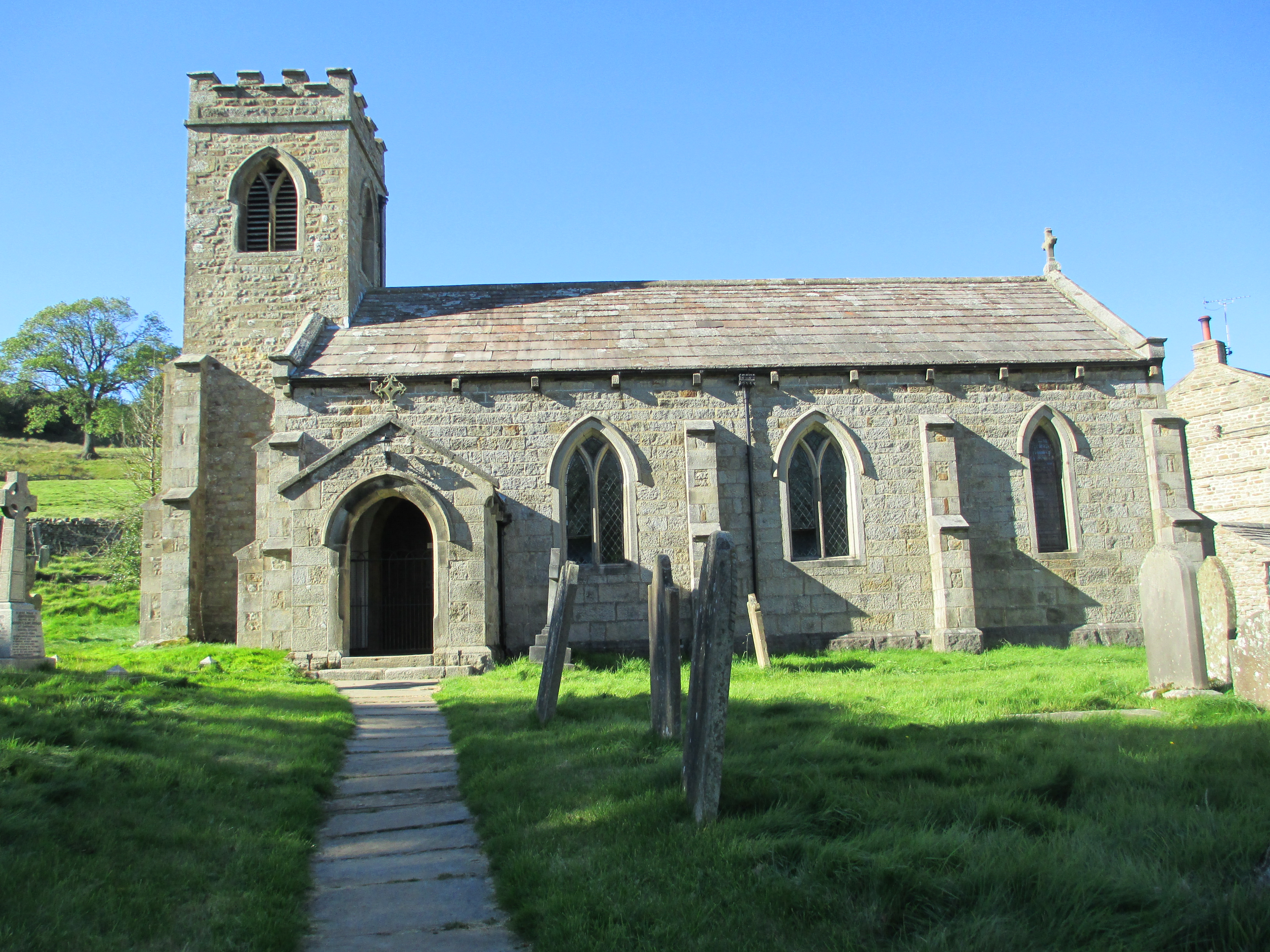
The church, in 2013

St Botolph's Church is an Anglican church in Horsehouse, a village in Coverdale in North Yorkshire, in England.

The first chapel in the village was built in about 1530, and was served by the canons of Coverham Abbey. Following the Dissolution of the Monasteries, it became a chapel of ease to Holy Trinity Church, Coverham. In 1859 it was described as "ancient" but "small". It was rebuilt in 1869, possibly incorporating some material from the original chapel. It was Grade II listed in 1988.

The church is built of stone with a stone slate roof, and consists of a nave and a chancel under one roof, a south porch, and a west tower. The tower has three stages, quoins, stepped angle buttresses, two-light bell openings with Y-tracery and hood moulds, a string course, and an embattled parapet. The porch has quoins, and contains a pointed arch with a chamfered surround and a hood mould. There are a variety of windows in the Gothic style, including a three-light window at the east end.

== See also ==
- Listed buildings in Carlton Highdale
