= Listed buildings in Carlton Highdale =

Carlton Highdale is a civil parish in Coverdale, in the county of North Yorkshire, England. It contains 38 listed buildings that are recorded in the National Heritage List for England. All the listed buildings are designated at Grade II, the lowest of the three grades, which is applied to "buildings of national importance and special interest". The parish contains the settlements of Braidley, Gammersgill and Horsehouse, and the surrounding countryside. Most of the listed buildings are houses, cottages and associated structures, farmhouses and farm buildings. The others include a guidestone, three bridges, a public house, a lime kiln, a former chapel, a church and a telephone kiosk.

== Buildings ==
Name and location	Photograph	Date	Notes
Hunters Stone; 54.18560°N 2.01352°W		Medieval (probable)	A guidestone, it consists of a sandstone monolith about 2 metres (6 ft 7 in) high. The stone has an irregular square plan, and on one face is inscribed a small cross.
Brackenrigg; 54.22231°N 1.92684°W	—	Early 17th century	A farmhouse in stone, with a stone slate roof, and stone coping on the right. There are two storeys and three bays. On the front is a lean-to porch with quoins, and a doorway with a chamfered quoined surround. There is one fixed light, and the other windows are casements, those in the upper floor with mullions.
Prospect House; 54.22743°N 1.92838°W	—	Early 17th century	A stone house with quoins, a moulded string course, and a stone slate roof. There are two storeys and five bays. The doorway has a projecting lintel, most of the windows on the front are sashes, in the left bay are two small windows, and at the rear is a two-light double-chamfered mullioned window.
Rivermead; 54.24192°N 1.91621°W	—	Early 17th century	The house is in stone and has a stone slate roof with stone coping. There are two storeys, two bays and a rear outshut. On the front is a doorway with a chamfered quoined surround, and three-light double-chamfered mullioned windows. The rear outshut has quoins, and contains a doorway with a quoined surround, a Tudor arch with a moulded arris and an initial in the spandrel, and a lintel with an illegible inscription. To the left are sash windows and a stair turret, and other windows.
Cow byre dated 1675; 54.20907°N 1.96766°W	—	1675	A house, later a cow byre with a hayloft above, in stone with quoins, and a stone slate roof with slab coping. There are two storeys and four bays. It contains a stable door with a quoined surround, a moulded arris, and a lintel with a triangular soffit containing recessed dated and initialled panels. The windows, which have been altered, contain fragments of double-chamfered mullioned windows.
Deerclose; 54.22625°N 1.93149°W	—	Late 17th century	A house and outbuilding, later combined, in stone, with quoins, and a stone slate roof with coping on the left. There are two storeys and four bays. The doorway has a chamfered quoined surround, and most of the windows are chamfered with mullions.
Top Building; 54.24259°N 1.91704°W	—	Late 17th century	A house, later used for other purposes, in stone, with quoins, and a stone slate roof with moulded stone coping and shaped kneelers. There are three storeys and three bays. It contains two doorways, one with a quoined surround, the other with a stone surround, bases, impost blocks, and a lintel with rounded inner corners, above which is a recess. The windows are mullioned with some mullions missing, and there is a fire window with a chamfered surround.
Cow House, Arkleside Farm; 54.22034°N 1.93412°W	—	1684	A house, later a cow house, with quoins, a stone slate roof, and two storeys. On the front is a doorway with a quoined surround, a moulded arris, a lintel containing a semicircular panel with the date and initials, and a hood mould with decorative motifs. Most windows are mullioned, one has a single light, and there is a round-headed fire window at the rear.
Cottage attached to the east end of Hall Farmhouse; 54.24248°N 1.91652°W	—	1684	The cottage is in stone, with quoins on the right, and a stone slate roof with moulded stone coping and a shaped kneeler on the right. There are three storeys, two bays, and a two-storey rear outshut. On the front are two doorways, the left with interrupted jambs, and a lintel with rounded corners and a hood mould, and to the right is a blocked doorway with a chamfered quoined surround, and a lintel containing a scalloped recessed panel with initials and the date, and a moulded hood mould. Most of the windows are chamfered with mullions, some with hood moulds, and at the rear is a single-light window and a sash window.
Hindlethwaite Hall; 54.22845°N 1.92156°W		Late 17th to early 18th century	A farmhouse in stone, with quoins on the right, and a stone slate roof with stone copings and shaped kneelers. There are two storeys and an L-shaped plan, with a main range of five bays, a rear wing and a single-storey lean-to. The central doorway has an architrave with bases, a pulvinated frieze and a cornice, and above it is an initialled and dated plaque. Over the doorway is a single-light window, and the other windows are mullioned in architraves. At the rear is a stair turret.
Farmhouse attached to Riverside Farm; 54.24282°N 1.91661°W	—	Late 17th to early 18th century	The farmhouse is in stone, with quoins, and a stone slate roof with stone coping and a shaped kneeler on the left. There are two storeys and three bays. The doorway has a chamfered quoined surround, and the windows are sashes.
Limekiln Farmhouse; 54.21573°N 1.94968°W	—	Early 18th century	The farmhouse, later a private house, is in stone with quoins and a stone slate roof. There are two storeys, three bays and a rear outshut. The doorway has a stone surround with bases and imposts, and the windows are sashes, mainly horizontally-sliding.
Farmhouse attached to Manor Farm; 54.22758°N 1.92823°W	—	Early 18th century	The farmhouse is in stone, with quoins on the right, and a stone slate roof. There are two storeys, five bays, and a rear outshut. The doorway has a quoined surround with a hollow chamfer, and above it is a plaque with a decorative frame containing initials and a date. The windows on the front are a mix of sashes and casements, and at the rear is a double-chamfered cross window with a mullion and a transom.
Middle House; 54.23703°N 1.90613°W	—	Early 18th century	A farmhouse, later a private house and an outbuilding, in stone, with quoins and a stone slate roof. There are two storeys, the house has two bays, and the outbuilding, slightly recessed on the right, has one. The house contains a doorway with a chamfered quoined surround, and the windows are casements. In the outbuilding is a doorway with a chamfered surround, above which is a shuttered opening.
Moorlands; 54.22744°N 1.92886°W	—	Early 18th century	A stone house with quoins, and a stone slate roof with stone coping and shaped kneelers. There are two storeys, two bays and a rear outshut. In the centre is a doorway with a chamfered quoined surround and bases, and a cornice, the windows are mullioned with three lights and architraves, and there is a small fire window.
Bridge End House and outbuilding 54.24300°N 1.91611°W	—	Early to mid 18th century	The house and attached outbuilding on the left are in stone with quoins and a stone slate roof. There are two storeys, the house has two bays, and the outbuilding has one. The house has a central doorway with a slightly chamfered surround, and the windows are mullioned, with a mullioned and transomed stair window at the rear. The outbuilding contains an opening in each floor.
Croft Farmhouse and outbuildings 54.22063°N 1.93387°W	—	Early to mid 18th century	The two cottages, later combined, and attached outbuildings are in stone with quoins, and stone slate roof with slab coping. There are two storeys, the house has two bays, the flanking outbuildings have one bay each, and at the rear is a two-storey outshut. In the centre is a doorway with a chamfered surround and impost blocks. Most of the windows are sashes with chamfered surrounds.
Hall Farmhouse and stable 54.24241°N 1.91668°W		1737	The farmhouse and stable are in stone, with quoins, a stone slate roof with stone coping and a shaped kneeler to the left, and two storeys. The house has four bays and a rear outshut. The central doorway has an architrave, a pulvinated frieze, and a cornice, and above it is an initialled and dated plaque. There are mullioned windows in both parts. The stable has two bays, and contains doorways and slit vents. Inside the house is an inglenook fireplace.
Braidley Farmhouse; 54.21585°N 1.94949°W	—	Mid 18th century	The farmhouse is in stone with quoins, a stone slate roof, two storeys and three bays. The central doorway has a stone surround with bases and impost blocks, and the windows are sashes with flush surrounds.
Sowersett; 54.22255°N 1.92848°W	—	Mid 18th century	A farmhouse with flanking outbuildings later incorporated into the house. It is in stone with quoins and a stone slate roof. There are two storeys and four bays. On the front is a two-storey porch with a single-storey extension to the left, and the window are mullioned. In the right bay, timber steps lead to an upper floor doorway.
Ghyll Cottage and Fell View; 54.22736°N 1.92891°W	—	Mid to late 18th century	Three cottages, later two, in stone, with quoins, and a stone slate roof with stone coping and a shaped kneeler on the left. The right house has two storeys and three bays. In the centre are paired doorways with bases, imposts, lintels with inner rounded corners, and cornices. Above them is an initialled and dated plaque, and the windows are mullioned with three lights. The house to the left is the same height, with three storeys and two bays. In the centre is a doorway with a chamfered surround, and the windows are sashes.
Low Farmhouse; 54.20891°N 1.96723°W	—	Mid to late 18th century	The farmhouse is in stone, with quoins on the right, and a stone slate roof. There are two storeys and two bays. The doorway has a stone surround and interrupted jambs, and the windows are sashes with slab surrounds.
Cow byre, Low Farm; 54.20898°N 1.96761°W	—	Mid to late 18th century	The farm building is in stone with quoins and a stone slate roof. There are two storeys and two bays. In the centre is a doorway that has a stone surround with bases and interrupted jambs, and to the left is a small window. At the rear is a pitching door, and in the right return are two doorways, one blocked.
Middle Farmhouse; 54.20892°N 1.96808°W	—	Late 18th century	The farmhouse is in stone, with quoins, and a stone slate roof with stone coping and shaped kneelers. There are two storeys, two bays, and a later recessed extension on the right. The doorway has stone surrounds and cornices, and the windows are sash windows with flush surrounds.
Cover Bridge; 54.20392°N 1.98108°W		1799	The bridge, which carries Cam Gill Road over the River Cover, is in stone, and consists of a single segmental arch. The bridge has voussoirs, and a slightly projecting parapet with rounded coping. The date is on the inner side of the upstream parapet.
Farm building south of Hall Farmhouse; 54.24201°N 1.91671°W	—	Late 18th to early 19th century	The farm building is in stone, with quoins, and a stone slate roof with stone coping and large shaped kneelers. There are two storeys and three bays. It contains two doorways with slab lintels, and above is a central pitching door.
Barn north of Moorlands; 54.22761°N 1.92881°W	—	Late 18th to early 19th century	The barn is in stone, with quoins, and a stone slate roof with stone coping and shaped kneelers. The openings include windows and doorways, and a large barn opening, some with quoined surrounds, and a pitching door.
Bridge over Gammersgill; 54.24303°N 1.91555°W	—	1802	The bridge, which carries a road over Gammersgill, is in stone. It consists of a single segmental arch, with voussoirs, and rounded coping to the parapets. The date is inscribed on the inner side of the downstream parapet.
Thwaite Arms Inn; 54.22730°N 1.92853°W		1808	The public house is in stone, with quoins, and a stone slate roof with stone coping. There are two storeys and three bays. The doorway has a quoined surround and a moulded arris, and above it is a plaque with a moulded frame containing initials, the date and decorative motifs. The windows are horizontally-sliding sashes, those in the ground floor with moulded surrounds. In the right bay is a doorway with a quoined surround and a deep lintel, and a small window.
Arkleside Bridge; 54.22303°N 1.93312°W		1811	The bridge carries a road over the River Cover and is in stone. It consists of a single segmental arch, and has a hood mould, coped parapets, and a datestone on the inner side of the upstream parapet.
Lime kiln 54.22324°N 1.93317°W		Early 19th century	The lime kiln is set into a hillside to the north of Arlkeside Bridge, and is in stone with a circular plan. It has a tall triangular opening leading to a V-shaped hearth, and there is a circular hole in the top.
House to the west of Sundial Cottage; 54.22772°N 1.92912°W	—	Early 19th century	The house is in stone, with a stone slate roof and stone coping on the left. There are two storeys and two bays. In the centre is a doorway, and the windows on the front are sashes. In the right return is a 12-pane fixed-light window.
Horsehouse Methodist Church; 54.22561°N 1.93008°W		1828	The chapel is in stone, with quoins, and a stone slate roof with stone coping. There is a single storey and two bays. The central doorway has a surround with bases, pilaster capitals and a lintel with rounded inner corners. The windows on the front are sashes, and in the right return are windows with pointed arches, imposts and keystones.
Coach house southwest of Rivermead; 54.24193°N 1.91651°W		Early to mid 19th century	The coach house is in stone, with quoins, and a stone slate roof with stone coping. There are two storeys and three bays. In the right bay is a segmental-arched carriage opening, in the centre is a doorway with a quoined surround, and to its left are external stone steps and a square window. In the middle of the upper floor is a doorway, and the outer bays contain square windows.
Barn southwest of Shooting Lodge; 54.20939°N 1.96871°W		Mid 19th century	The barn is in stone, with quoins, and a stone slate roof with stone coping. There are two storeys and four bays. On the front are four doorways with interrupted jambs, and above is a central opening. At the rear are three upper floor openings, and the building contains through stones.
Barn and coach house, Hall Farm; 54.24206°N 1.91686°W	—	1858	The barn and attached coach house are in stone with quoins and stone slate roofs. The barn has two storeys and three bays, and contains three doorways with impost blocks, the middle one with a dated lintel. The coach house has a single storey and three bays, and contains two doorways, and a segmental-arched carriage entrance with voussoirs and a dated keystone.
St Botolph's Church; 54.22707°N 1.92911°W		1869	The church is in stone with a stone slate roof, and consists of a nave and a chancel under one roof, a south porch, and a west tower. The tower has three stages, quoins, stepped angle buttresses, two-light bell openings with Y-tracery and hood moulds, a string course, and an embattled parapet. The porch has quoins, and contains a pointed arch with a chamfered surround and a hood mould.
Telephone kiosk, Horsehouse; 54.22690°N 1.92882°W	—	1935	The K6 type telephone kiosk outside the post office was designed by Giles Gilbert Scott. Constructed in cast iron with a square plan and a dome, it has three unperforated crowns in the top panels.
