= John Bowes (preacher) =

English preacher

John Bowes (1804–1874), was an English preacher.

== Life ==
Bowes was born at Swineside, Coverdale, in Coverham parish, Yorkshire, on 12 June 1804, son parents of very humble circumstances. Bowes began teaching while in his teens, first among the Wesleyans, and then as a primitive methodist minister. Bowes renounced party appellations around 1830 to start a new mission at Dundee, with the help of Jabez Burns.

Bowes eventually left Dundee and went from town to town, preaching in the open air or wherever he could gather a congregation. He always declined to take part in a service at which money was taken, as he could not think of "saddling the gospel with a collection." He was several times prosecuted for street preaching, and often suffered privations in his journeyings. In 1840 a complaint was made against Bowes by the Superintendent of Police in Dundee for his 'haranguing' people and for his causing an obstruction. As a result of this complaint he was fined one shilling.

Bowes was an earnest and vigorous platform speaker, ever ready to combat with socialists, freethinkers, or Roman Catholics. He additionally advocated temperance and peace. In 1848, Bowes was one of the representatives of England at the Brussels Peace congress.

During the greater portion of his life, Bowes refused to accept a salary for his ministrations, and he seems to have supported himself and family chiefly by the sale of his own tracts and books.

Bowes died at Dundee on 23 September 1874, aged 70. His son, Robert Aitken Bowes, was editor of the Bolton Guardian, and died on 7 November 1879, aged 42.

== Publications ==
Bowes' publications consist of some 220 tracts; two series of magazines—the Christian Magazine and the Truth Promoter—issued between 1842 and 1874; pamphlets on The Errors of the Church of Rome,;; Mormonism exposed, Second Coming of Christ, The Ministry,;; &c.; discussions with Lloyd Jones, G. J. Holyoake, Joseph Barker, C. Southwell, W. Woodman, and T. H. Milner; a volume on Christian Union (1835, 310 pages); a translation by himself of the New Testament (1870); and his Autobiography (1872).
