= Listed buildings in Coverham with Agglethorpe =

Coverham with Agglethorpe is a civil parish in the county of North Yorkshire, England. It contains 18 listed buildings that are recorded in the National Heritage List for England. Of these, one is listed at Grade I, the highest of the three grades, five are at Grade II*, the middle grade, and the others are at Grade II, the lowest grade. The parish contains the village of Coverham, the hamlet of Agglethorpe and the surrounding countryside. The most important building in the parish is Coverham Abbey, the ruins of which are listed, together with adjacent buildings, some incorporating material from the abbey. Most of the other listed buildings are houses, farmhouses and associated structures, and the rest include a church, a bridge, and a boundary stone.

== Key ==
Grade	Criteria
I	Buildings of exceptional interest, sometimes considered to be internationally important
II*	Particularly important buildings of more than special interest
II	Buildings of national importance and special interest

== Buildings ==
Name and location	Photograph	Date	Notes	Grade
Coverham Abbey; 54.27312°N 1.83870°W		13th century	The remains of the ruined abbey are in stone, and parts have been incorporated into later buildings. The freestanding parts are; the west wall of the north transept; the west wall of the nave and the north aisle, including a doorway; two 14th-century arches of the south nave arcade; and the south respond of the east nave arch and part of the wall of the south transept.	I
Holy Trinity Church, Coverham; 54.27291°N 1.84177°W		13th century	The church has been altered and extended through the centuries. It is built in stone with a stone slate roof, and consists of a nave, a south aisle, a south porch, a chancel with a north vestry, and a west tower. The tower has three stages, diagonal buttresses, a three-light west window, two-light bell openings, and an embattled parapet with corner crocketed finials.	II*
Stone effigies of knights, Coverham Abbey House; 54.27286°N 1.83867°W		Late 13th century	The two stone effigies have been set against a garden wall. The right effigy is the earlier, depicting a knight in chain mail with a surcoat, a long sword and a shield. The hands are folded in prayer, and the legs are crossed. The left effigy dates from the early 14th century, and depicts a knight, also in chain mail with a surcoat, a sword and a shield, and with crossed legs. Behind it is a scene of a stag chased by two hounds, with a third hound biting the shield.	II*
Coverham Bridge; 54.27147°N 1.84123°W		15th or 16th century	The bridge carries Hanghow Lane over the River Cover. It is in stone and consists of a single chamfered pointed arch. The bridge has a plinth, voussoirs, and parapets with saddleback coping.	II*
Coverham Abbey Gatehouse; 54.27242°N 1.84064°W		Early 16th century	The ruins of the gatehouse at the entry to the grounds of Coverham Abbey are in stone with a stone slate roof, and consist of an archway and flanking gatehouse buildings. The arch is semicircular with two chamfered orders and moulded imposts. The buildings each has a small vent and a chamfered window, and the sides have been converted into barrel vaulted chambers for animal shelters.	II*
Abbey Cottage; 54.27309°N 1.83901°W	—	16th century	The house is in stone, with projecting quoins, and a stone slate roof with stone copings and shaped kneelers. There are two storeys and three bays. In the ground floor are three round-headed sash windows with keystones and an impost band. The upper floor contains a sash window in each outer bay with a plain surround, and between them is a panel with an interlace border, initials, a coronet and an eagle. Above it are a lamb and flag motif, and below it are three shields. At the rear are mullioned windows.	II
Coverham Abbey House; 54.27286°N 1.83895°W		16th century	Parts of the Coverham Abbey buildings have been incorporated into a 19th-century house. It is in stone, and has a stone slate roof with stone copings and shaped kneelers. There are two storeys and an L-shaped plan, with a main range of five bays. On the south front is a Doric doorway with an entablature, a fanlight and an open pediment. The windows are sashes, the window above the door is tripartite and has a moulded hood mould. The older range is lower and on the east front is a long Latin inscription.	II
Garth Cottage; 54.27299°N 1.83899°W	—	16th century	The guesthouse of Coverham Abbey, later a house, in stone with a stone slate roof and two storeys. In the centre is a doorway with a straight-sided pointed arch and a moulded surround. Above it is a stepped hood mould containing the initial "A" and motifs including an eagle, and over that are three corbels. The windows are mullioned. At the rear are various types of window, including a sash window, a mullioned and transomed window, and mullioned windows with moulded hood moulds.	II*
Agglethorpe Hall; 54.27250°N 1.86795°W		17th century	A farmhouse to which a parallel rear range was added in the 19th century. It is in stone, with quoins, and a Welsh slate roof with stone copings. There are two storeys and a basement, and a double depth plan. The south entrance front has five bays. In the centre is a moulded doorcase on plinths. The basement windows are double-chamfered and mullioned, and in the upper floors are sash windows and blocked fire windows. The later rear range facing south has three bays, and a central doorway with a fanlight and a cornice.	II
Cotescue Park House and cottage 54.27756°N 1.83844°W		1662 (probable)	The house and cottage, which date mainly from the late 18th century are in stone, partly roughcast, with two storeys. The house has a plinth, rusticated quoins, a modillion cornice, and a stone slate roof with stone copings and shaped kneelers. There are fronts of five and three bays, and two rear ranges at right angles. In the centre is a porch containing a doorway with an eared architrave, a pulvinated frieze and a pediment. The windows are sashes in moulded surrounds. In the right rear range is a medieval quatrefoil with a shield below, and an initialled datestone. The cottage at the end of the right range has two bays, and contains a square bay window.	II
Farm building northwest of Brecongill House; 54.27666°N 1.86339°W	—	Late 17th to early 18th century	A house, later a farm building, in stone with quoins and a stone slate roof. There are three storeys and three bays, the left bay projecting. On the front is a doorway with a chamfered quoined surround and two stable doors. On the left bay, steps lead up to a pitching door. There are the mains of double-chamfered mullioned windows, and in the top floor are sash windows.	II
Farm buildings, Agglethorpe Hall; 54.27246°N 1.86844°W	—	Late 17th to early 18th century	The range of farm buildings to the west of the house consists of stables and cart sheds. They are in stone with stone slate roofs, two storeys and six bays. The left three bays are earlier, and have quoins, and stone copings and shaped kneelers on the left. They contain two doorways with chamfered surrounds, a pitching door, a single-light window, and mullioned windows with some mullions missing. The right three bays contain two segmental-arched cart openings with quoined surrounds, stable doors and loft openings.	II
Outbuilding east of Coverham Abbey House; 54.27297°N 1.83857°W	—	Early 18th century	The outbuilding is in stone on a plinth, with quoins, and a stone slate roof with stone copings and shaped kneelers. There are two storeys and four bays. The building contains two doorways with chamfered quoined surrounds, and double-chamfered mullioned windows.	II
Gate and gate piers west of Coverham Abbey House; 54.27250°N 1.84030°W	—	18th century	The gate piers are in sandstone, they are rusticated, and have cornices and acorn finials. There is a single cast iron gate with fleurs-de-lis finials.	II
Gate and gate piers east of Coverham Abbey House; 54.27279°N 1.83775°W	—	Late 18th to early 19th century	The gate piers are in stone, and have cornices and ball finials. The cast iron gate has fleurs-de-lis finials.	II
Garden wall with archway, Coverham Abbey House; 54.27272°N 1.83856°W	—	Late 18th to early 19th century	The garden wall to the east of the house has a curving plan. It is built with carved stones from Coverham Abbey, and contains a 13th-century chamfered arch on half-column bases.	II
Boundary stone 54.26888°N 1.83114°W		Early 19th century	The boundary stone on the north side of Hanghow Lane consists of a roughly shaped stone about 500 millimetres (20 in) high. It has a badly weathered inscription.	II
Brecongill House; 54.27649°N 1.86334°W	—	Early 19th century	A farmhouse in stone on a plinth, with rusticated quoins, and a hipped stone slate roof. There are two storeys, and an L-shaped plan with a front range of three bays. In the centre is a doorway in an eared architrave, with a fluted frieze and a cornice. This is flanked by Venetian windows, and in the upper floor are sash windows. The left return has four bays and contains tripartite and sash windows.	II
