= Listed buildings in Carlton Town =

Carlton Town is a civil parish in Coverdale, in the county of North Yorkshire, England. It contains 20 listed buildings that are recorded in the National Heritage List for England. All the listed buildings are designated at Grade II, the lowest of the three grades, which is applied to "buildings of national importance and special interest". The parish contains the village of Carlton and the surrounding area. All the listed buildings are in the village and, apart from a public house, they are all houses, cottages and farmhouses together with associated structures.

== Buildings ==
Name and location	Photograph	Date	Notes
Foresters Arms Inn; 54.25760°N 1.89790°W		17th century	The public house is in stone with quoins and a stone slate roof. There are two storeys, four bays, a rear outshut, and a cross-range on the right. The doorways have quoined surrounds, one is also chamfered. The windows in the main range are casements, some with architraves, and in the cross-range are sash windows.
Old building northeast of the Old Hall; 54.25694°N 1.90396°W	—	1695	A farm building, probably originally a wing of a manor house, in stone, with quoins, a string course, and a corrugated sheet roof. There are two storeys and two bays. The windows are double-chamfered, some with mullions, and some blocked. The building contains two lintels, one with a triangular soffit and a sunken panel with initials and a date, and the other with a fern motif in a keystone, and sunken panels.
Ghyll Farmhouse; 54.25855°N 1.89510°W	—	Late 17th century	A farmhouse and cottage, later combined, in stone, with quoins, a moulded string course and a stone slate roof. There are wo storeys, a two-storey rear outshut, and three bays. The windows have double-chamfered surrounds and most are mullioned, and the doorway in the right return has a chamfered surround.
Crag View; 54.25771°N 1.89991°W	—	Late 17th to early 18th century	A stone cottage with quoins and a stone slate roof. There are two storeys and two bays, and a single-storey lean-to on the right. The doorway in the right bay has an architrave with bases. The ground floor window is chamfered and mullioned with three lights, and in the upper floor are two-light casement windows with double-chamfered surrounds.
Old Hall; 54.25683°N 1.90401°W	—	Late 17th or early 18th century	A farmhouse in stone, with quoins, and a stone slate roof with stone coping. There are two storeys, a partial rear outshut, and three bays. On the front is a porch containing a doorway with interrupted jambs, and at the rear is a doorway with a quoined surround, a moulded arris, and outer moulding forming a keystone-shape on the lintel. The windows either have chamfered surrounds or architraves, and contain sashes, or are mullioned. Inside there is an inglenook fireplace.
Town Foot Farmhouse; 54.25925°N 1.89000°W	—	Late 17th to early 18th century	The farmhouse is in stone, with quoins, and an artificial stone slate roof with moulded stone coping and shaped kneelers. There are two storeys, three bays and a partial rear outshut. The doorway has a chamfered surround, and the windows are double-chamfered and mullioned.
Town Head House; 54.25645°N 1.90613°W	—	1714	A farmhouse in stone, with quoins, and a two-span stone slate roof with stone coping and shaped kneelers. There are two storeys, a double-depth plan and two bays. The central doorway has a chamfered quoined surround, and a lintel with a shield, initials and the date. The windows are double-chamfered and mullioned.
Flatts Farmhouse, walls and railings 54.25724°N 1.90418°W		Early to mid 18th century	The farmhouse is in stone, with quoins, and a stone slate roof with stone coping and a shaped kneeler on the left. There are two storeys, four bays and a rear outshut. The doorway in the second bay has a quoined surround and a canopy on wrought iron brackets, above which is a large triangular-headed panel with an inscription. The flanking bays contain three-light mullioned windows in architraves, and in the right, slightly recessed, bay are sash windows. The side garden wall has slab coping, and at the front is a low round-arched stone wall and cast iron railings with fleur-de-lys finials. The central gateway has chamfered rusticated piers with pyramidal caps, and there is a similar end pier.
Pear Tree House; 54.25859°N 1.89378°W	—	Early to mid 18th century	The house is in stone, with quoins, and a stone slate roof with moulded coping and elaborately shaped kneelers. There are two storeys and two bays. In the centre of the front is a doorway with a stone lintel, in the right return is a doorway with a chamfered quoined surround, and to its right a small opening with a chamfered surround. Most of the windows are mullioned, and at the rear is a Venetian window in an architrave. Inside the house is an inglenook fireplace.
The Hermitage, outbuilding and railings 54.25747°N 1.90341°W	—	Early to mid 18th century	The vicarage, later a private house, and the flanking outbuildings, are in stone and have stone slate roofs with moulded coping and shaped kneelers, and two storeys. The house has five bays, and to the right is a slightly recessed two-bay extension. The central doorway has a quoined surround, a moulded arris, a lintel with a keystone and a cornice, and the windows are sashes. The left outbuilding contains garage doors and windows with chamfered surrounds, some with mullions. In the right outbuilding are double doors with a chamfered surround and impost blocks, a sash window and a blocked vent.
Appletree Cottage; 54.25691°N 1.90533°W	—	Mid 18th century	The cottage is in stone with quoins and a stone slate roof. There are two storeys and two bays. The doorway is in the centre, the ground floor contains three-light mullioned windows, and in the upper floor are sash windows. All the openings have stone architraves.
Prospect House; 54.25679°N 1.90489°W	—	Mid 18th century	The house is in stone on a plinth, with quoins, a sill band, and a stone slate roof with stone copings and shaped kneelers. There are two storeys and three bays. In the centre is a doorway with a quoined surround, and moulded corbels carrying a cornice with stone slate capping. The windows are casements, and at the rear, facing the street, is a Venetian window.
Elm Tree House and Cottage and railings 54.25684°N 1.90573°W	—	1751	A farmhouse and attached house in stone, with a stone slate roof, stone copings and shaped kneelers. There are two storeys and five bays, the farmhouse occupying the left four bays. In the middle bay is a two-storey gabled porch with quoins containing a doorway with an architrave, above which is a dated and initialled panel, a two-light window with a chamfered surround, and a ball finial on the apex. To the right is a doorway with pilasters, Tuscan capitals, and a lintel with rounded inner corners. In the farmhouse, the ground floor windows are mullioned in architraves, the upper floor windows are double-chamfered and mullioned, and in the house are casement windows. Extending from the door to the front gate are railings with decorative finials on a stone base.
House west of Clovelley Dene; 54.25842°N 1.89538°W	—	Mid to late 18th century	A stable, later a house, in stone on a plinth, with quoins and a stone slate roof with stone coping and a shaped kneeler on the left, and a ball finial on the ridge. There are two storeys and five bays. In the right bay is a carriageway, over which is a triangular-headed window. The second bay contains a garage door, and the windows are sashes, one with a mullion.
Coverley Farmhouse, Dale View and railings 54.25801°N 1.89693°W		Mid to late 18th century	A pair of houses in stone, with quoins, and a stone slate roof with stone copings and shaped kneelers. There are two storeys and four bays. The doorway has a stone surround with imposts, and the windows are sashes. In the right return is a doorway with a chamfered surround, and the remains of a double-chamfered mullioned window. The side walls of the garden are in stone, the terminals rendered with ogee sandstone caps, one with initials, the other with a date. The front garden wall has cast iron railings with fleur-de-lys finials.
Seaton House; 54.25767°N 1.89965°W	—	Mid to late 18th century	The house, at one time partly a shop, in stone on a plinth, with quoins, a dentilled cornice, and a stone slate roof with moulded coping and a shaped kneeler on the left. The central doorway has an architrave and a fanlight, above it is a panel flanked by fluted pilasters, and over that is a sash window with similar pilasters. To the left of the doorway is a tripartite shop window with mullions, the bases flanking dado panels, and above is a frieze and an overhanging cornice. The other windows are sashes in architraves.
Old Hall Byre; 54.25683°N 1.90431°W	—	Late 18th century	A farm building in stone with quoins, and a stone slate roof with stone copings and shaped kneelers. There are two storeys and three bays. It contains doorways and windows, and external steps lead up to a doorway with chamfered quoined surround.
Clovelley Dene; 54.25848°N 1.89524°W	—	Late 18th to early 19th century	A stone house with chamfered rusticated quoins, and a stone slate roof with stone coping and large shaped kneelers. There are two storeys and three bays. The doorway has an architrave and a fanlight, and the windows are sashes in architraves. In the right return are the ledges of a blocked pigeoncote in the gable.
Flatts Cottage; 54.25728°N 1.90403°W	—	Early 19th century	Two cottages combined into one, in stone, with a stone slate roof, and stone coping and a shaped kneeler on the right. There are two storeys and two bays. On the front are two doorways with stone surround, the right with an impost block. The windows are sashes with impost blocks.
The Mount and outbuildings 54.25714°N 1.90363°W	—	Early to mid 19th century	The house and the two outbuildings to the right are in stone, with gutter brackets, and stone slate roofs with stone coping and shaped kneelers, and two storeys. The house has three bays, and contains a doorway and sash windows with stone surrounds. The outbuilding to the right contains a segmental-arched carriage entrance with a chamfered surround and a keystone with a star, above which is a stone with a cross, a hayloft opening, and a dated and initialled stone. The further outbuilding projects and its openings include a doorway with impost blocks.
