= Coverham Bridge =

Stone bridge in North Yorkshire, England

Coordinates: 54°16′17″N 1°50′29″W

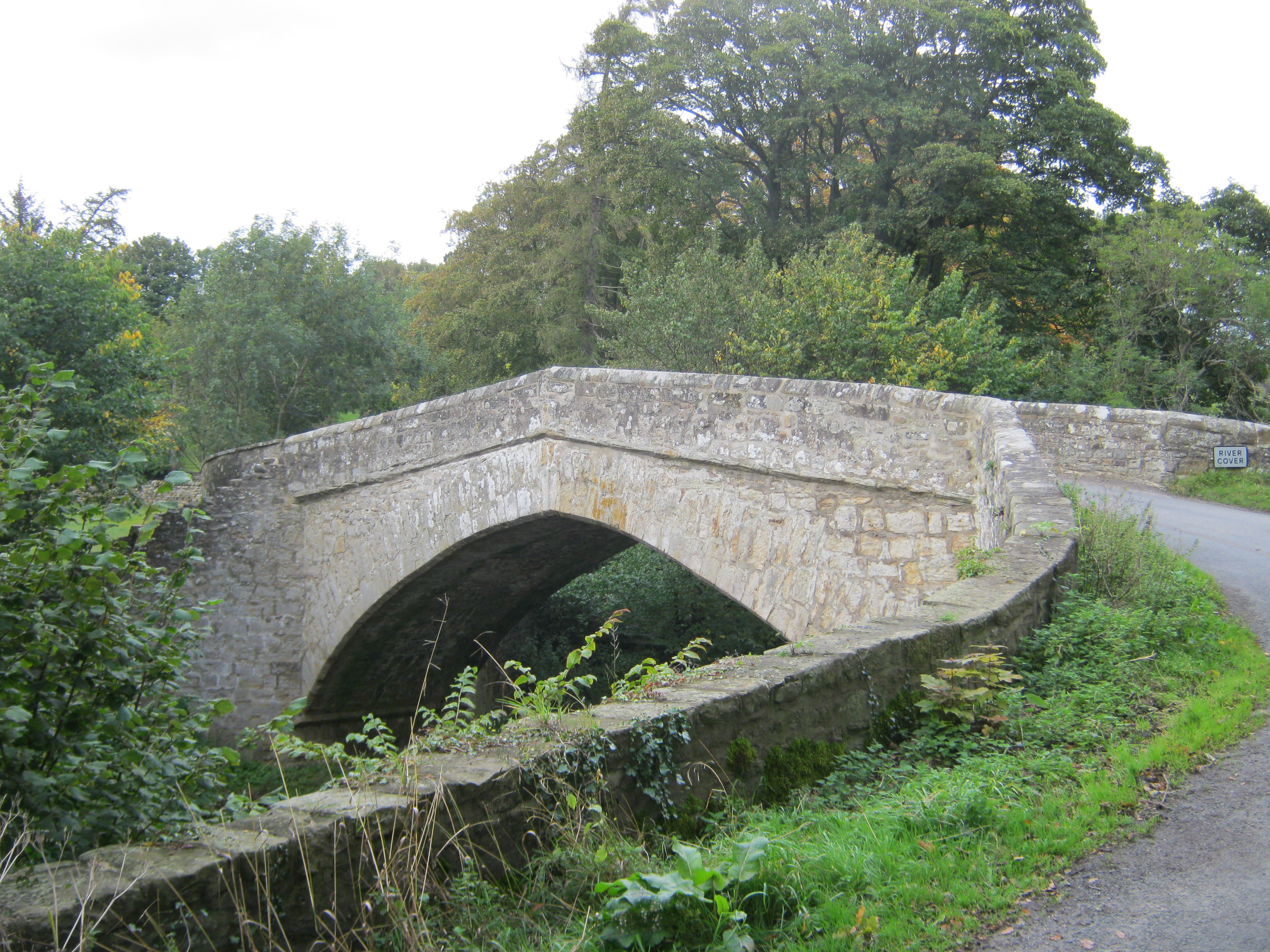
The bridge, in 2011

Coverham Bridge is a historic bridge in Coverham, a village in North Yorkshire, in England.

The bridge provides access to Coverham Abbey, and is variously dated between the 14th and 16th centuries. It was first documented in 1615, when it was described as being "in great decay", and an order was given for its repair. Parapets were added later, and it was resurfaced in the 20th century, to permit access by motor vehicles. It was Grade II* listed in 1967 and was formerly a scheduled monument, although it now forms part of the larger Coverham Abbey scheduled monument.

The bridge carries Hanghow Lane over the River Cover. It is built of stone and consists of a single chamfered pointed arch, which is 50 feet (15 m) wide, while the bridge is 12 feet (3.7 m) from side to side. The parts of the arch next to the abutments have tighter radii than the remainder of the arch. The bridge has a plinth, voussoirs, and parapets with saddleback coping.

== See also ==
- Grade II* listed buildings in North Yorkshire (district)
- Listed buildings in Coverham with Agglethorpe
