= Melmerby in Coverdale =

Village and civil parish in North Yorkshire, England

Coordinates: 54.26316°N 1.88323°W

Melmerby
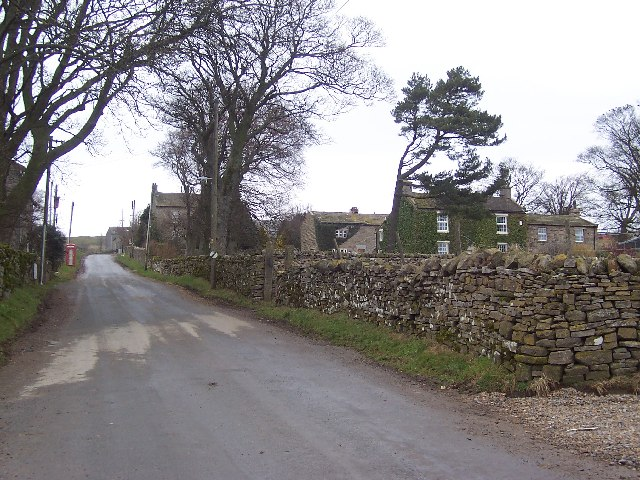
- Melmerby

- Location within North Yorkshire
- Population: 40
- OS grid reference: SE077852
- Civil parish: Melmerby
- Unitary authority: North Yorkshire
- Ceremonial county: North Yorkshire
- Region: Yorkshire and the Humber
- Country: England
- Sovereign state: United Kingdom
- Post town: Leyburn
- Postcode district: DL8
- Police: North Yorkshire
- Fire: North Yorkshire
- Ambulance: Yorkshire

Melmerby is a village and civil parish in North Yorkshire, England. It lies in Coverdale in the Yorkshire Dales about 3 miles (4.8 km) south-west of Leyburn. Its neighbours are the villages of Carlton and Agglethorpe. The population of the civil parish was estimated at 40 in 2015.

Melmerby was mentioned in the Domesday Book. The name is Old Norse, meaning "Melmor's farmstead": the personal name Melmor is a Scandinavian borrowing from the Old Irish personal name Máel Muire. Melmerby was historically a township in the large ancient parish of Coverham in the North Riding of Yorkshire, and became a separate civil parish in 1866. From 1974 to 2023 it was part of the district of Richmondshire, it is now administered by the unitary North Yorkshire Council.

== See also ==
- Listed buildings in Melmerby in Coverdale
