= Carlton Highdale =

Civil parish in North Yorkshire, England

Coordinates: 54.211°N 1.963°W

Carlton Highdale is a civil parish in Coverdale, North Yorkshire, England. According to the 2001 census it had a population of 95.

The parish covers the uppermost part of the dale, and is drained by the River Cover. Hamlets in the parish are Woodale, Braidley, Horsehouse, Gammersgill and Swineside.

The parish was historically part of the manor of Carlton in the large parish of Coverham. At some time the manor was divided into two manors (and townships), Carlton Town (the village of Carlton) and Carlton Highdale (the remaining part). In 1866 the township became a separate civil parish.

From 1974 to 2023 it was part of the district of Richmondshire, it is now administered by the unitary North Yorkshire Council.

== See also ==
- Listed buildings in Carlton Highdale
