= Garth Cottage =

Cottage in Coverham, North Yorkshire, England

Coordinates: 54°16′23″N 1°50′20″W

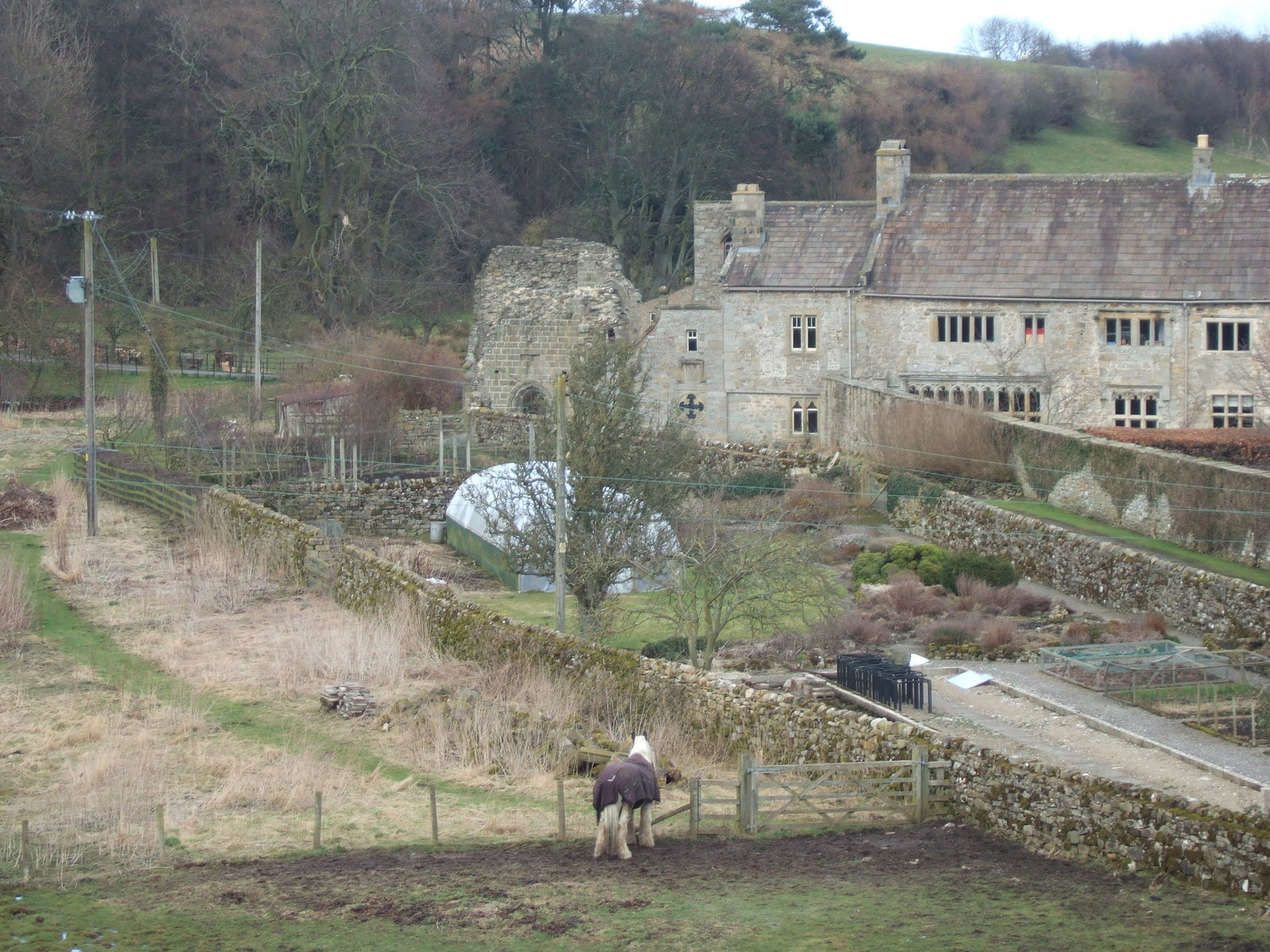

Garth Cottage is a historic building in Coverham, a village in North Yorkshire, in England.

The building originated as the central section of the medieval west range of Coverham Abbey, a 13th-century Premonstratensian house. In the 16th century, the monastery was dissolved, and the range was redeveloped as a house. Research in 1995 identified the internal east wall of the entrance lobby as probably surviving from the abbey, but the majority of the current building dates from the 17th century, or from a remodelling in about 1900. The building was Grade II* listed in 1967.

The two-storey house is built of stone, with a stone slate roof. In the centre is a doorway with a straight-sided pointed arch and a moulded surround. Above it is a stepped hood mould containing the initial "A" and motifs including an eagle, and over that are three corbels. The windows are mullioned. At the rear are various types of window, including a sash window, a mullioned and transomed window, and mullioned windows with moulded hood moulds. Inside, there is a large arched fireplace with a hoodmould.

== See also ==
- Grade II* listed buildings in North Yorkshire (district)
- Listed buildings in Coverham with Agglethorpe
