= Foresters Arms =

Listed pub in North Yorkshire, England

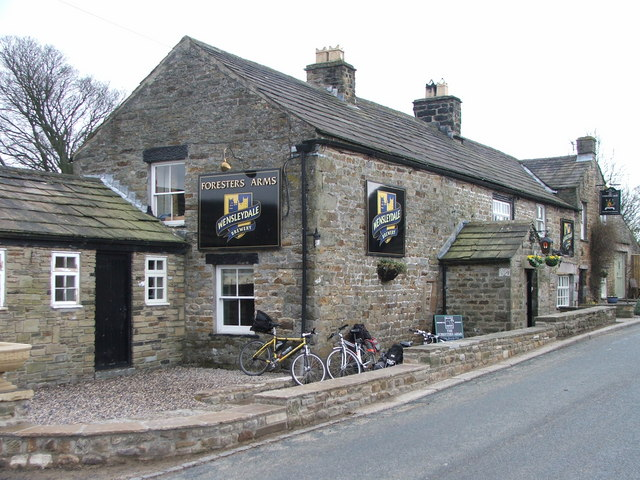
- The pub in 2006
- Interactive map of the Foresters Arms area
- Former names: Hare and Hounds; The Board

General information
- Type: Public house (originally a farmhouse)
- Location: Village Street, Carlton, Richmondshire, England
- Coordinates: 54.25759°N 1.89787°W
- Year built: 17th century
- Renovated: Early 18th century (altered); 19th century (added)

Design and construction
- Designations

Listed Building – Grade II
- Official name: Foresters Arms Inn
- Designated: 13 February 1967
- Reference no.: 1179540

Website
- forestersarmscoverdale.com

The Foresters Arms is a historic pub on Village Street in Carlton, a village in Coverdale, North Yorkshire, England.

The building was constructed in the 17th century, as a single-roomed farmhouse. Standing on the route from Lancaster and Middleham, the owner began making money by selling ale to travellers. In the early 18th century, a bar room was added, and stabling and accommodation was offered, the property becoming an inn. Originally known as the "Hare and Hounds", and then as "The Board", it was renamed in the 1840s for the Coverdale Foresters' Friendly Society, a branch of the Ancient Order of Foresters which became independent. The local branch of the foresters maintains a tradition of an annual parade starting from the pub.

The building was altered in the 1980s and reorganised and refurbished in 1990. In 2003, the Wensleydale Brewery was founded at the pub. In 2011, the local community raised £350,000 to purchase the pub and run it as a community co-operative.

The building is constructed of stone with quoins and a stone slate roof. There are two storeys, four bays, a rear outshut, and a cross-range on the right. The doorways have quoined surrounds, one is also chamfered. The windows in the main range are casements, some with architraves, and in the cross-range are sash windows. It has been Grade II listed since 1967.

== See also ==
- Listed buildings in Carlton Town
