= Caldbergh =

Hamlet in North Yorkshire, England

Coordinates: 54.26232°N 1.86023°W

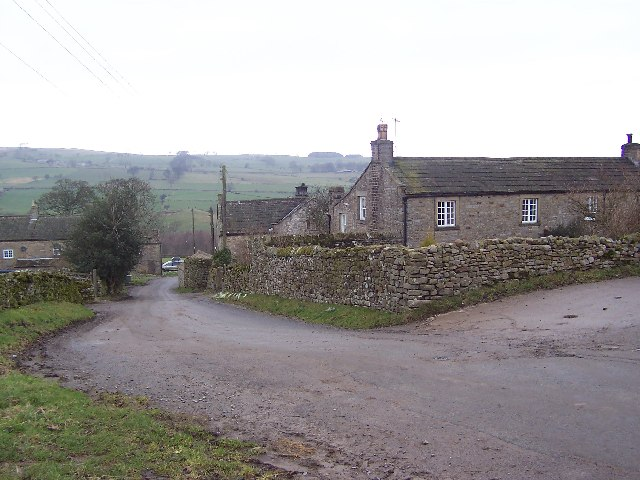
- Looking through Caldbergh down into Coverdale

- Location within North Yorkshire
- Civil parish: Caldbergh with East Scrafton
- Unitary authority: North Yorkshire
- Ceremonial county: North Yorkshire
- Region: Yorkshire and the Humber
- Country: England
- Sovereign state: United Kingdom
- Police: North Yorkshire
- Fire: North Yorkshire
- Ambulance: Yorkshire

Caldbergh (Caldeber in the Domesday Book) is a hamlet within the Yorkshire Dales, North Yorkshire, England. It lies about four miles south of Leyburn. East Scrafton and Coverham are nearby.

From 1974 to 2023 it was part of the district of Richmondshire, it is now administered by the unitary North Yorkshire Council.

== See also ==
- Listed buildings in Caldbergh with East Scrafton
