= Woodale =

Hamlet in North Yorkshire, England

Coordinates: 54.2095°N 1.96842°W

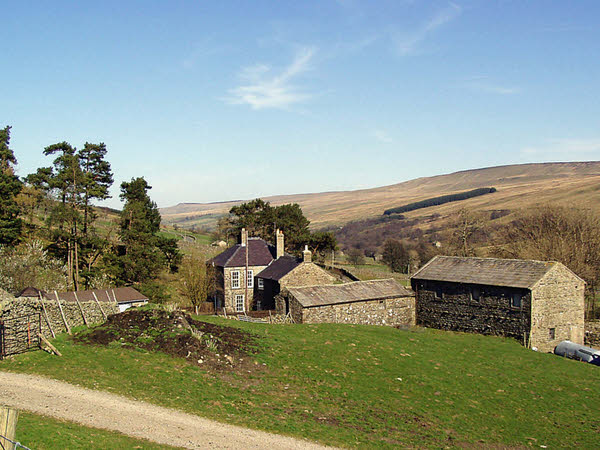
- Woodale and Coverdale

- Location within North Yorkshire
- Civil parish: Carlton Highdale
- Unitary authority: North Yorkshire
- Ceremonial county: North Yorkshire
- Region: Yorkshire and the Humber
- Country: England
- Sovereign state: United Kingdom
- Police: North Yorkshire
- Fire: North Yorkshire
- Ambulance: Yorkshire

Woodale is a hamlet in Coverdale in the Yorkshire Dales in England. It lies in the civil parish of Carlton Highdale in the county of North Yorkshire. The River Cover flows nearby.

The name Woodale stems from Old English and means Valley of the Wolves.

The hamlet should not be confused with the even smaller settlement of Woodale in the parish of Stonebeck Up in upper Nidderdale. The two places are only 4 miles (6 km) apart.

From 1974 to 2023 it was part of the district of Richmondshire, it is now administered by the unitary North Yorkshire Council.
