= West Scrafton =

Village and civil parish in North Yorkshire, England

Coordinates: 54.24832°N 1.88894°W

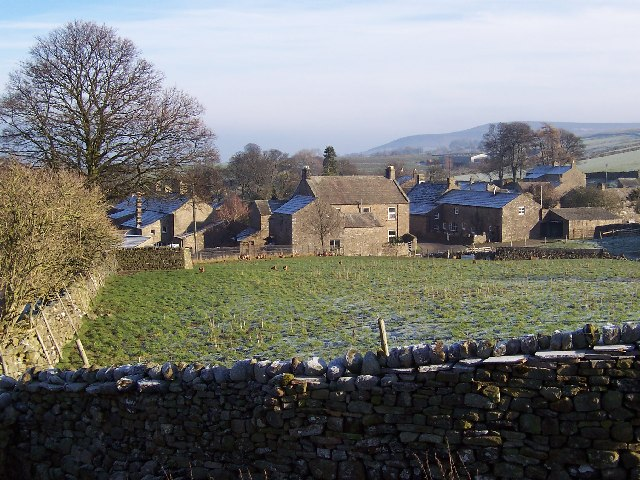
- West Scrafton

- Location within North Yorkshire
- OS grid reference: SE073836
- Civil parish: West Scrafton
- Unitary authority: North Yorkshire
- Ceremonial county: North Yorkshire
- Region: Yorkshire and the Humber
- Country: England
- Sovereign state: United Kingdom
- Post town: Leyburn
- Postcode district: DL8
- Police: North Yorkshire
- Fire: North Yorkshire
- Ambulance: Yorkshire

West Scrafton is a village and civil parish in Coverdale in the Yorkshire Dales, England. It is located 4 miles (6.4 km) south west of Leyburn. The population was estimated at 70 in 2013.

The village lies on the south bank of the River Cover. The parish extends 2.5 miles (4 km) south of the village, rising over West Scrafton Moor to the peak of Great Haw.

West Scrafton has featured several times in the British television series All Creatures Great and Small, in the episodes "A New Chapter" and "Alarms & Excursions". It is also where James Herriot, whose books were the inspiration for the series, holidayed with his wife, Joan.

Scrafton was mentioned in the Domesday Book. The name is Old English, from scræf and tūn, meaning "settlement at the hollow". By 1286 Scrafton had been divided into East Scrafton and West Scrafton. East Scrafton was the smaller place, and is now a hamlet in the neighbouring civil parish of Caldbergh with East Scrafton.

In the Middle Ages West Scrafton was a vill held by the Abbot of Coverham. It was historically a township in the large ancient parish of Coverham in the North Riding of Yorkshire, and became a separate civil parish in 1866. In 1974 it was transferred to the new county of North Yorkshire. From 1974 to 2023 it was part of the district of Richmondshire, it is now administered by the unitary North Yorkshire Council.

In the 19th century a small coal mine, the West Scrafton Colliery, was worked on the moorland 1.5 miles (2.4 km) south of the village. It was abandoned in 1914.

== See also ==
- Listed buildings in West Scrafton
