= Listed buildings in Caldbergh with East Scrafton =

Caldbergh with East Scrafton is a civil parish in the county of North Yorkshire, England. It contains seven listed buildings that are recorded in the National Heritage List for England. All the listed buildings are designated at Grade II, the lowest of the three grades, which is applied to "buildings of national importance and special interest". The parish contains the hamlets of Caldbergh and East Scrafton and the surrounding countryside. The listed buildings consist of the ruins of a chapel, three farmhouses, a former packhorse bridge, a limekiln and a telephone kiosk.

== Buildings ==
Name and location	Photograph	Date	Notes
Ruins of St Simon's chapel 54.26026°N 1.86901°W		1328	The chapel, which was ruined by 1582, is in stone. It has a rectangular plan, about 20 metres (66 ft) long and 6 metres (20 ft) wide. The remains of the north wall are about 2 metres (6 ft 7 in) high, the south wall is about 1 metre (3 ft 3 in) high, and the other walls survive only as footings.
Scrafton Lodge; 54.25794°N 1.86530°W	—	17th century	A manor house, later a farmhouse, in stone, with quoins, and stone slate roofs with stone coping and shaped kneelers. There are two storeys, a double range plan, a main front of five bays, and a rear lean-to. On the front is a doorway with a chamfered quoined surround, a canted bay window, and a porch with a hipped roof, and in the left bay is a segmental-arched carriage opening. The windows are sashes, some with a chamfered surround, and some with double-chamfered mullions. At the rear is a segmental-arched doorway with roll moulding on the arris, and a lintel containing a raised initialled and dated panel.
Ulla Bridge; 54.26146°N 1.86133°W		17th to 18th century (probable)	A packhorse bridge crossing Caldbergh Gill, it is in stone. It consists of a single segmental arch that has been widened on each side, resulting in three parallel structures. The bridge has soffits of evenly-sized and shaped voussoirs.
Manor Farmhouse; 54.26115°N 1.85842°W	—	1685 or earlier	A manor house, later a farmhouse, in stone with a stone slate roof, stone coping and shaped kneelers. There are two storeys and attics, and an L-shaped plan, with a range of six bays, a two-storey wing, and a single-storey outshut in the angle. The doorway has a quoined surround, a moulded arris, and a lintel with a triangular soffit, containing a decorated recessed initialled and dated panel. Most of the windows are chamfered and mullioned, some with transoms, some with hood moulds, and the others include fire windows, a chamfered round window, and blocked segmental-arched windows in the attics.
Home Farmhouse; 54.25747°N 1.86562°W	—	18th century	The farmhouse is in stone, with quoins, and a stone slate roof with stone copings and shaped kneelers. There are two storeys and six bays. On the front are three doorways, the one on the left is slightly recessed, it has a chamfered quoined surround and a re-set initialled and dated panel, and the others have stone surrounds, one with a fanlight. The windows are a mix of sashes, casements and mullioned windows.
Limelikn; 54.26026°N 1.86901°W		18th century	The limekiln is in sandstone. It has a circular plan, a V-shaped hearth under a segmental arch, and a circular hole on the top accessed by a ramp.
Telephone kiosk 54.26118°N 1.85884°W		1935	The K6 type telephone kiosk outside Rose Cottage was designed by Giles Gilbert Scott. Constructed in cast iron with a square plan and a dome, it has three unperforated crowns in the top panels.
