= Listed buildings in West Scrafton =

West Scrafton is a civil parish in the county of North Yorkshire, England. It contains twelve listed buildings that are recorded in the National Heritage List for England. All the listed buildings are designated at Grade II, the lowest of the three grades, which is applied to "buildings of national importance and special interest". The parish contains the village of West Scrafton and the surrounding area, and all the listed buildings are in the village. Most of these are houses, farm houses and associated structures, and the others are a bridge and a telephone kiosk.

== Buildings ==
Name and location	Photograph	Date	Notes
The Chantry; 54.24867°N 1.88878°W	—	15th century	A chapel, later altered and converted into a house, in stone with quoins and a stone slate roof. There are two storeys, three bays, and a partial rear outshut. The doorway has a quoined slightly chamfered surround and an initialled lintel. The windows are a mix of casements and sashes, and on the right return is a two-light window with a pointed arch and Perpendicular tracery.
Bow Bridge; 54.24838°N 1.88827°W		16th century (possible)	The bridge carries High Lane over Great Gill. It is in stone, with later steel girders, and consists of a single segmental arch. It was later widened on both sides by extensions carried on girders. There are parapets on the outer extensions.
Chapman's Cottage; 54.24968°N 1.88927°W		Early to mid-17th century	The house is in stone, with quoins, and stone slate roof with stone coping. There are two storeys, three bays and a rear extension. In the centre is a gabled porch with a tile roof, and a doorway with a quoined surround. To its left is a mullioned and transomed window, to its right is a single-light window, and the other windows are mullioned.
Bridge End Farmhouse; 54.24823°N 1.88839°W	—	Mid-17th century	The farmhouse is in stone, with quoins, and a stone slate roof with stone copings. There are two storeys and four bays. The doorway has a basket arch and a chamfered quoined surround. On the front is one casement window, the other windows on the front are sashes, and at the rear is a two-light mullioned window.
Manor House, bink and garage 54.24864°N 1.88914°W		Mid to late 17th century	The house is in stone, with quoins on the left, and a stone slate roof with stone coping on the right. There are two storeys and four bays. The doorway has a chamfered quoined surround, and most of the windows are mullioned with architraves. Projecting on the left is a bink that has stone sides, a slab shelf, and a slab roof. The garage at the right, formerly a cottage, projects on the right and has a single storey. It contains a doorway, a garage door, and windows.
Crag View; 54.24876°N 1.88907°W	—	Late 17th to early 18th century	The house is in stone, and has a stone slate roof with stone coping on the right. There are two storeys and two bays. On the ground floor is an opening on the left, and to the right is a porch containing a doorway with a segmental arched head and a beaded arris and casement windows, and further to the right is a stair turret.
The Old Inn; 54.24855°N 1.88925°W	—	Early 18th century	An inn, later a house with outbuildings. it is in stone with stone slate roofs. The house has two storeys, three bays and a rear outshut. There are quoins on the right, and the roof has shaped kneelers and moulded stone coping. The doorway has a slightly chamfered and quoined surround and a cornice, and the windows are mullioned with architraves. To the left is a lean-to outbuilding containing a segmental-arched opening, and external stone steps leading to a doorway.
Cullen House; 54.24828°N 1.88889°W	—	Early to mid-18th century	The house is in stone on a plinth, with quoins, and a stone slate roof with stone coping and shaped kneelers. There are two storeys and two bays, and a rear outshut. The doorway and the windows have architraves. The windows vary; some are mullioned, others are sashes, and the rest have single lights.
Culverham Farmhouse; 54.24913°N 1.88966°W	—	Mid to late 18th century	The farmhouse is in stone, and has a stone slate roof with stone coping and shaped kneelers. There are two storeys and three bays, and a rear outshut. The doorway has a stone surround and a re-set lintel containing a recessed plaque with initials and a date. The windows on the front are sashes, and at the rear is a round-arched landing window.
Coach house northeast of The Chantry; 54.24878°N 1.88869°W	—	Late 18th to early 19th century	The coach house, later used for other purposes, is in stone with quoins and a stone slate roof. There are two storeys and two bays. On the left bay is a coach house entrance with a hayloft opening above, and the right bay has external steps leading up to a doorway with a quoined surround.
Wall with bee boles 54.24835°N 1.89101°W	—	19th century (probable)	The wall to the west of Hill Top Farmhouse is in stone. It has pillars projecting from it, slabbed over to form eleven bee boles.
Telephone kiosk 54.24849°N 1.88899°W		1935	The telephone kiosk is of the K6 type designed by Giles Gilbert Scott. Constructed in cast iron with a square plan and a dome, it has three unperforated crowns in the top panels.
