= Braidley =

Hamlet in North Yorkshire, England

Coordinates: 54.2161°N 1.94892°W

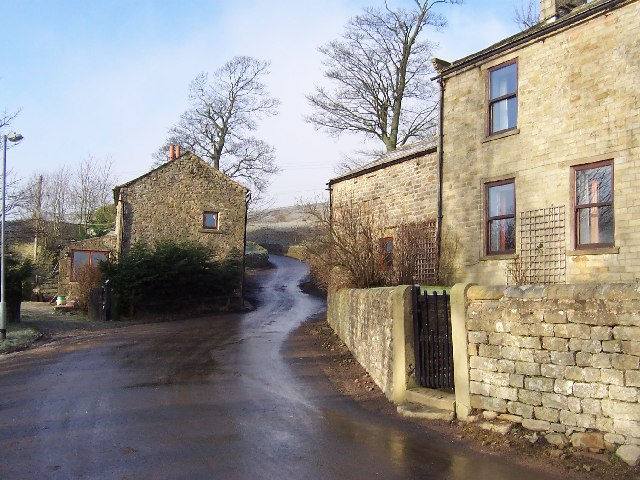
- Braidley

- Location within North Yorkshire
- OS grid reference: SE034800
- Civil parish: Carlton Highdale
- Unitary authority: North Yorkshire
- Ceremonial county: North Yorkshire
- Region: Yorkshire and the Humber
- Country: England
- Sovereign state: United Kingdom
- Police: North Yorkshire
- Fire: North Yorkshire
- Ambulance: Yorkshire

Braidley is a hamlet in Coverdale in the Yorkshire Dales, England. It lies in the civil parish of Carlton Highdale in the county of North Yorkshire. The River Cover flows nearby, and the peak of Little Whernside is visible from the hamlet.

From 1974 to 2023 it was part of the district of Richmondshire, it is now administered by the unitary North Yorkshire Council.

== See also ==
- Listed buildings in Carlton Highdale
