= East Scrafton =

Hamlet in North Yorkshire, England

Coordinates: 54.257°N 1.866°W

- Location within North Yorkshire
- OS grid reference: SE088846
- Civil parish: Caldbergh with East Scrafton
- Unitary authority: North Yorkshire
- Ceremonial county: North Yorkshire
- Region: Yorkshire and the Humber
- Country: England
- Sovereign state: United Kingdom
- Post town: Leyburn
- Postcode district: DL8
- Police: North Yorkshire
- Fire: North Yorkshire
- Ambulance: Yorkshire
- UK Parliament: Richmond and Northallerton

East Scrafton is a hamlet in Coverdale in North Yorkshire, England, about 3 miles (5 km) south-west of Leyburn, in the civil parish of Caldbergh with East Scrafton.

From 1974 to 2023 the area was part of the district of Richmondshire; it is now administered by the unitary North Yorkshire Council.

The name Scrafton comes from Old English and means "farmstead near a hollow". There is also a larger West Scrafton to the south.

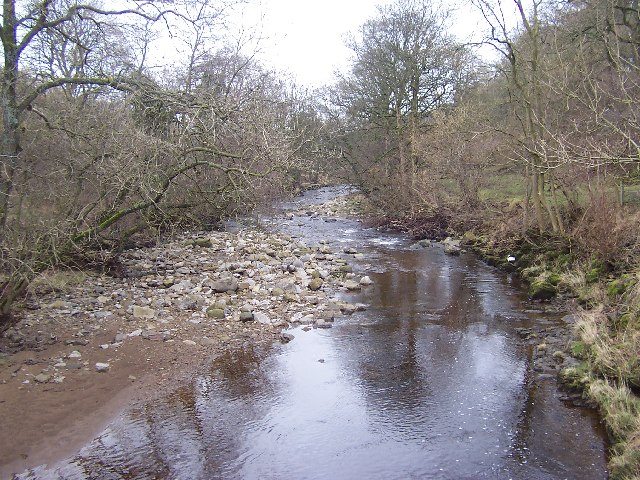
Looking down the River Cover from St Simon's Bridge, next to the ruined chapel of ease of St Simon and St Jude, by East Scrafton

== See also ==
- Listed buildings in Caldbergh with East Scrafton
