= Listed buildings in Melmerby in Coverdale =

Melmerby in Coverdale is a civil parish in the county of North Yorkshire, England. It contains five listed buildings that are recorded in the National Heritage List for England. All the listed buildings are designated at Grade II, the lowest of the three grades, which is applied to "buildings of national importance and special interest". The parish contains the village of Melmerby and the surrounding area. All the listed buildings are in the village, and consist of farmhouses and farm buildings.

== Buildings ==
Name and location	Photograph	Date	Notes
Hillside Farmhouse and outbuildings 54.26439°N 1.88373°W	—	Mid to late 17th century	The farmhouse and attached outbuildings are in stone, with quoins, and stone slate roofs with stone coping. There are two storeys, eight bays, and a rear outshut. The original house, to the left, has a stepped plinth, and contains a doorway with a chamfered surround and mullioned windows. The outbuildings contain sash and casement windows, doorways and a segmental-arched opening. Inside the farmhouse is an inglenook fireplace.
Old Farmhouse; 54.26454°N 1.88500°W	—	Late 17th century	The farmhouse, later a private house, is in stone and has a stone slate roof with shaped kneelers. There are two storeys, four bays, and a rear outshut. The doorway has a chamfered surround, and the windows are mullioned.
Hall Garth Farmhouse and outbuilding 54.26320°N 1.88512°W	—	Late 17th to early 18th century	The farmhouse and outbuilding are under one roof, and are in stone, partly roughcast, and have a stone slate roof with stone coping. There are two storeys, five bays and a rear outshut. The doorway has a chamfered quoined surround. There is one casement window, and the other windows are mullioned. On the upper floor is a hayloft entrance, and inside the farmhouse is an inglenook fireplace.
Barn northwest of Mile House west 54.26366°N 1.88357°W	—	Mid 18th century	The barn is in stone, with quoins, and a stone slate roof with shaped kneelers and moulded stone coping. There are two storeys and three bays. In the centre is a barn opening with a chamfered quoined surround and a curved timber lintel, partly infilled with a door and a window, and three later openings.
Manor House and stable range 54.26466°N 1.88420°W	—	Early 19th century	The farmhouse and stable range are in stone with stone slate roofs. The house has quoins, a moulded cornice, two storeys and three bays. The central doorway has a fanlight, and the windows are sashes. The stable range to the rear on the right has a single storey and contains a doorway with impost blocks.
