= Holy Trinity Church, Coverham =

Coordinates: 54.2729°N 1.8418°W

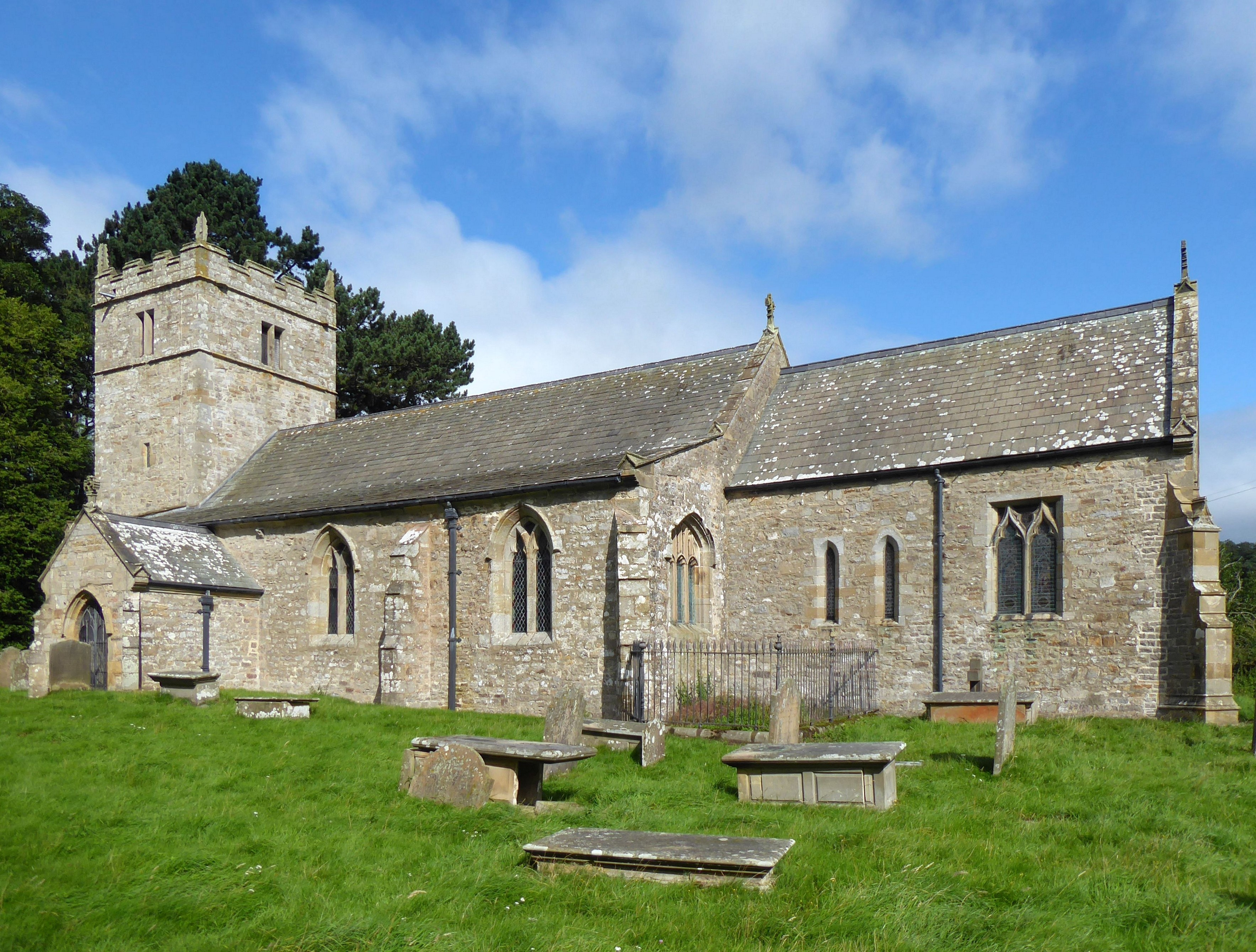
- Holy Trinity Church, Coverham, from the south

- Location in North Yorkshire
- OS grid reference: SE 103 863
- Location: Coverham, North Yorkshire
- Country: England
- Denomination: Anglican
- Website: Churches Conservation Trust

Architecture
- Functional status: Redundant
- Heritage designation: Grade II*
- Designated: 13 February 1967
- Architectural type: Church
- Style: Gothic
- Groundbreaking: 13th century

Specifications
- Materials: Stone, stone slate roofs

Holy Trinity Church is a redundant Anglican church in the village of Coverham, North Yorkshire, England. It is recorded in the National Heritage List for England as a designated Grade II* listed building, and is under the care of the Churches Conservation Trust. The church stands near the ruins of the Premonstratensian Coverham Abbey, and not far from the River Cover.

== History ==
The church dates from the 13th century, the nave and the south wall of the chancel probably being built at this time. It is thought that the south aisle was added during the following century, and the west tower was built in the 15th century. Restorations were carried out in 1854 and 1878. Holy Trinity was declared redundant on 1 September 1985, and was vested in the Trust on 10 June 1987.

== Architecture ==
=== Exterior ===
Holy Trinity is constructed in stone rubble, with stone slate roofs. Its plan consists of a nave with a south aisle and a south porch, a chancel with a north vestry, and a west tower. The tower is in three stages and has diagonal buttresses. Its lowest stage has a three-light west window, in the middle stage is a light vent on the south side, and the top stage has a two-light bell opening on each side. At the summit is an embattled parapet with crocketted finials on the corners. The east window in the chancel has three lights and is in Perpendicular style. In the south wall of the chancel are a square-headed two-light window and two lancet windows. On its north wall is the vestry and a pointed two-light window. The north wall of the nave has four pointed two-light windows. The south wall of the aisle has three pointed two-light windows and a porch. The east window in the aisle is round-headed with three lights. On the gables of the nave, chancel and porch are crosses. Over the south doorway is a lintel consisting of a re-used cross shaft dating from the Anglo-Saxon era.

=== Interior ===
Inside the church is a four-bay arcade with pointed arches supported by octagonal columns without bases or capitals. There is an ogee-headed piscina in the south chancel wall, and a simple piscina in the wall of the south aisle. The church is floored with Victorian encaustic tiles. In the windows of the south aisle are small shields in painted glass dating possibly from the medieval period. There is a ring of three bells, the oldest being cast in 1632 by William Oldfield, and the other two in 1770 by Pack and Chapman at the Whitechapel Bell Foundry. The parish registers begin in 1707.

== Popular culture ==
The church is featured in the 1978 British television series All Creatures Great and Small, in the episode "Mending Fences" as well as in the Christmas Special of 1985.

== See also ==
- Grade II* listed churches in North Yorkshire (district)
- Listed buildings in Coverham with Agglethorpe
- List of churches preserved by the Churches Conservation Trust in Northern England
