= George Addy =

English footballer

Personal information
- Full name: George Addy
- Date of birth: 27 April 1891
- Place of birth: Carlton, England
- Date of death: 1971 (aged 79–80)
- Position: Left-half

Senior career*
Years	Team	Apps	(Gls)
- Carlton Victoria
1919	Barnsley	1	(0)
1920–1921	Norwich City	31	(6)
- * Club domestic league appearances and goals

George Addy (born 1891) was a footballer who played in the Football League for Barnsley and Norwich City.
