= Horsehouse =

Village in North Yorkshire, England

Coordinates: 54°13′40″N 1°55′42″W

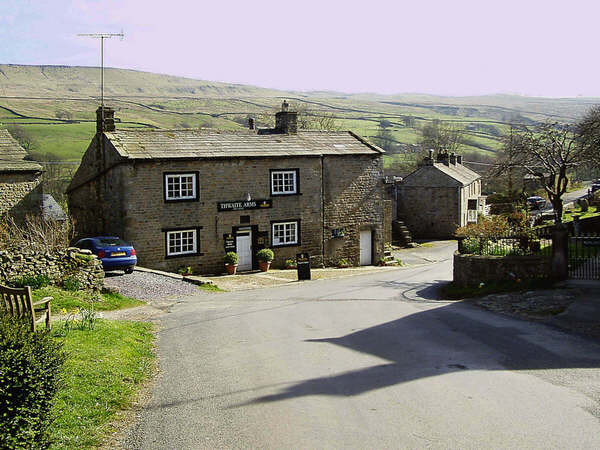
- The Thwaite Arms

- Location within North Yorkshire
- Civil parish: Carlton Highdale
- Unitary authority: North Yorkshire
- Ceremonial county: North Yorkshire
- Region: Yorkshire and the Humber
- Country: England
- Sovereign state: United Kingdom
- Police: North Yorkshire
- Fire: North Yorkshire
- Ambulance: Yorkshire

Horsehouse is a village in Coverdale in the Yorkshire Dales, North Yorkshire, England. It is listed as a hamlet in many texts, but the presence of the church makes it a village. The River Cover runs near the village, and it lies some 6 miles (9.7 km) and 8.5 miles (13.7 km) south-west of Middleham and Leyburn respectively, at an elevation of 820 feet (250 m).

Most of the settlements in Highdale (the parish that Horsehouse is within), were first described in the 13th century, but Horsehouse was not recorded until the 15th century. The village is so named because it provided facilities for horses using the packhorse routes that crossed in the village. One route crossed over into Wharfedale, which is the route that still exists into Kettlewell over Park Rash.

Horsehouse was historically in the wapentake of Hang West, the chapelry of Coverham and in the Leyburn Rural District. From 1974 to 2023 it was part of the district of Richmondshire, it is now administered by the unitary North Yorkshire Council.

The village is home to St Botolph's Church, a Grade II listed building rebuilt between 1867 and 1869, and the Thwaite Arms public house, built in 1808. St Botolph's was recorded in an indenture of 1530 from Coverham Abbey, stating a canon would officiate at the church. It had existed before this time, but it is unknown for how long. There are five dedications to St Botolph in Yorkshire. St Botolph became the patron saint of boundaries, travel and trade, so it is thought the church dedication reflects the previous trades of the packhorse routes. A Wesleyan Methodist chapel was erected in the Horsehouse in 1828, and the communities of the Wesleyan's and the Primitive Methodists reunited in 1933. The chapel at Horsehouse is now a private dwelling.

== See also ==
- Listed buildings in Carlton Highdale
