= Agglethorpe =

Hamlet in North Yorkshire, England

Coordinates: 54.2739°N 1.86797°W

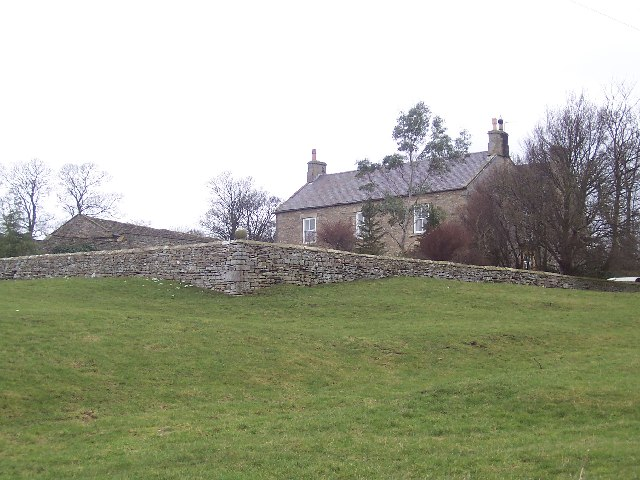
- Farm at Agglethorpe

- Location within North Yorkshire
- OS grid reference: SE086864
- Civil parish: Coverham with Agglethorpe
- Unitary authority: North Yorkshire
- Ceremonial county: North Yorkshire
- Region: Yorkshire and the Humber
- Country: England
- Sovereign state: United Kingdom
- Post town: LEYBURN
- Postcode district: DL8
- Police: North Yorkshire
- Fire: North Yorkshire
- Ambulance: Yorkshire

Agglethorpe is a hamlet in North Yorkshire, England, it lies in northern Coverdale, approximately 4 miles (6.4 km) south west of Leyburn.

== History ==
The name Agglethorpe derives from the Old English personal name Acwulf and the Old Norse þorp meaning 'secondary settlement'.

In 1086 it was recorded as Aculestorp in the Domesday Book.

In 1870–72 John Marius Wilson's Imperial Gazetteer of England and Wales described Agglethorpe as:

"A joint township with Coverham, in Coverham parish, W. R. Yorkshire".

The Grade II listed building of Agglethorpe Hall was built in the 17th century.

== Governance ==
The hamlet lies within the Richmond and Northallerton parliamentary constituency, which is under the control of the Conservative Party. The current Member of Parliament, since the 2015 general election, is Rishi Sunak.

From 1974 to 2023 it was part of the district of Richmondshire, it is now administered by the unitary North Yorkshire Council. It forms part of the civil parish of Coverham with Agglethorpe, along with Coverham.

== See also ==
- Listed buildings in Coverham with Agglethorpe
