= Gammersgill =

Hamlet in North Yorkshire, England

Coordinates: 54.2425°N 1.9160°W

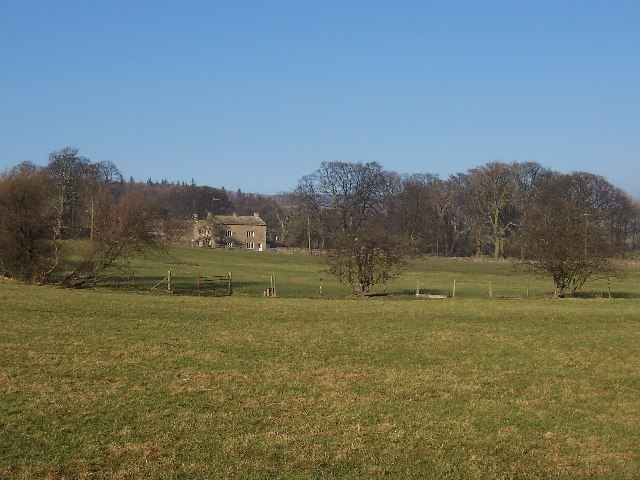
- Looking over pastureland to Gammersgill

- Location within North Yorkshire
- Civil parish: Carlton Highdale
- Unitary authority: North Yorkshire
- Ceremonial county: North Yorkshire
- Region: Yorkshire and the Humber
- Country: England
- Sovereign state: United Kingdom
- Police: North Yorkshire
- Fire: North Yorkshire
- Ambulance: Yorkshire

Gammersgill is a hamlet in Coverdale in the Yorkshire Dales, North Yorkshire, England. It is about 7 miles (11 km) south-west of Leyburn.

The toponym is of Old Norse origin, from Gamall, a personal name, and skali 'hut', so means 'hut of a man named Gamel'.

From 1974 to 2023 it was part of the district of Richmondshire, it is now administered by the unitary North Yorkshire Council.

== See also ==
- Listed buildings in Carlton Highdale
