= Coverham with Agglethorpe =

Civil parish in North Yorkshire, England

Coordinates: 54.275°N 1.870°W

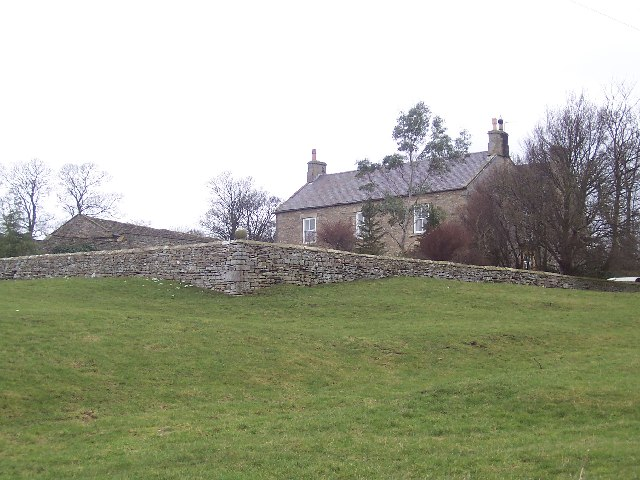
- Farm at Agglethorpe

- Location within North Yorkshire
- Population: 90 (2015 estimate)
- Civil parish: Coverham with Agglethorpe
- Unitary authority: North Yorkshire
- Ceremonial county: North Yorkshire
- Region: Yorkshire and the Humber
- Country: England
- Sovereign state: United Kingdom
- Police: North Yorkshire
- Fire: North Yorkshire
- Ambulance: Yorkshire

Coverham with Agglethorpe is a civil parish in North Yorkshire, England. It includes the villages of Coverham and Agglethorpe. The population of the civil parish was estimated at 90 in 2015.

From 1974 to 2023 it was part of the district of Richmondshire, it is now administered by the unitary North Yorkshire Council.

== See also ==
- Listed buildings in Coverham with Agglethorpe
