= Caldbergh with East Scrafton =

Civil parish in North Yorkshire, England

Coordinates: 54.263°N 1.859°W

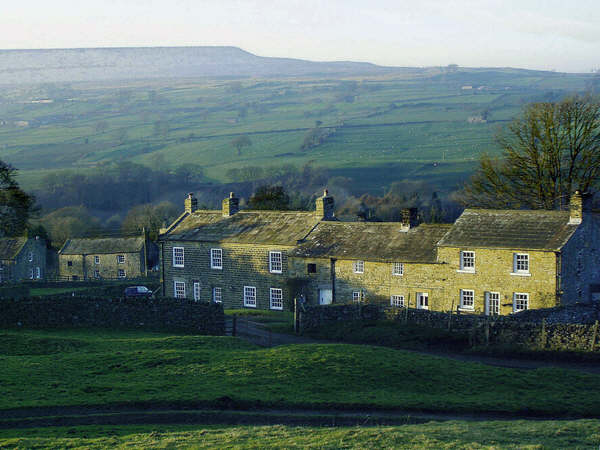
Cottages in Caldbergh

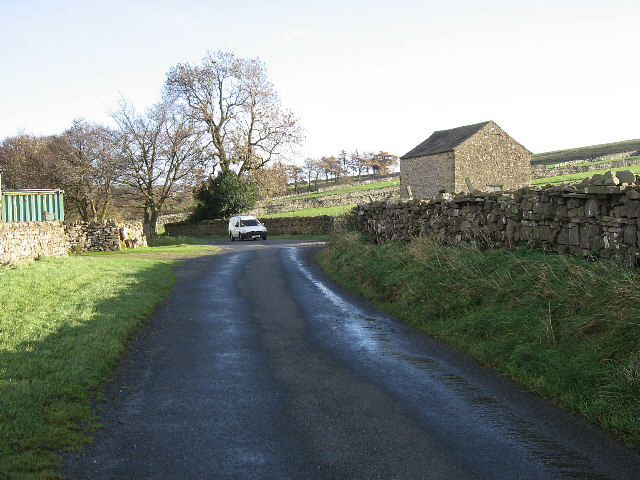
Approach to East Scrafton

Caldbergh with East Scrafton is a civil parish in the county of North Yorkshire, England. The parish includes the settlements of Caldbergh and East Scrafton.

The population of the parish was estimated at 40 in 2013. From 1974 to 2023 it was part of the district of Richmondshire, it is now administered by the unitary North Yorkshire Council.

== See also ==
- Listed buildings in Caldbergh with East Scrafton
