= Carlton, Richmondshire =

Village and civil parish in North Yorkshire, England

Coordinates: 54°15′27″N 1°53′56″W

Carlton
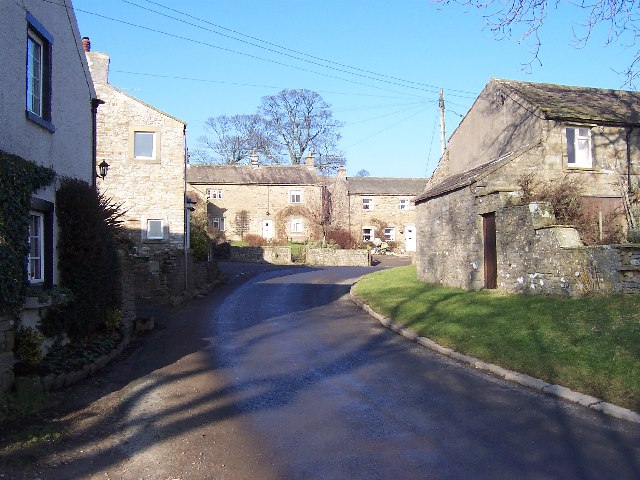
- Carlton

- Location within North Yorkshire
- Population: 232 (2011 census)
- OS grid reference: SE068847
  - London: 200 mi (320 km) SSE
- Civil parish: Carlton Town
- Unitary authority: North Yorkshire
- Ceremonial county: North Yorkshire
- Region: Yorkshire and the Humber
- Country: England
- Sovereign state: United Kingdom
- Post town: Leyburn
- Postcode district: DL8
- Police: North Yorkshire
- Fire: North Yorkshire
- Ambulance: Yorkshire
- UK Parliament: Richmond and Northallerton

Carlton is a village in the civil parish of Carlton Town in the county of North Yorkshire, England. According to the 2011 Census it had a population of 232. Carlton Town, the formal name of the civil parish, distinguishes the parish from the adjacent civil parish of Carlton Highdale, historically part of the manor of Carlton. The village is in the Yorkshire Dales National Park, near the River Cover in Coverdale. From 1974 to 2023 it was part of the district of Richmondshire, it is now administered by the unitary North Yorkshire Council.

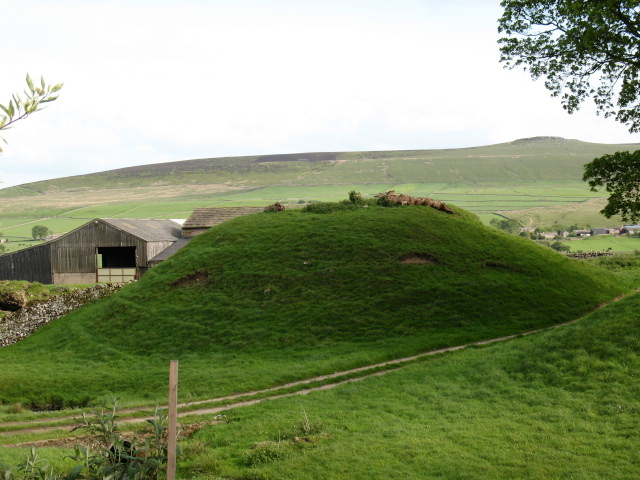
Carlton Castle

Carlton is the largest village in Coverdale and it has a public house, The Foresters Arms, and a village hall. It was also home to the "Coverdale Bard", Henry Constantine, and an 1861 inscription in his memory is above the entrance to Flatts Farm.

The name Carlton derives from the Old Norse karl meaning free peasant and the Old English tūn meaning 'settlement'.

In 1086, Carlton was mentioned in the Domesday Book, with a count of 12 households, under the name 'Carleton'.

In 2011 the Forester's Arms was purchased by the local community.

To the east is the medieval motte of Carlton Castle.

== See also ==
- Listed buildings in Carlton Town
- George Addy
