= Coverham =

Village in North Yorkshire, England

Coordinates: 54°16′23″N 1°50′49″W

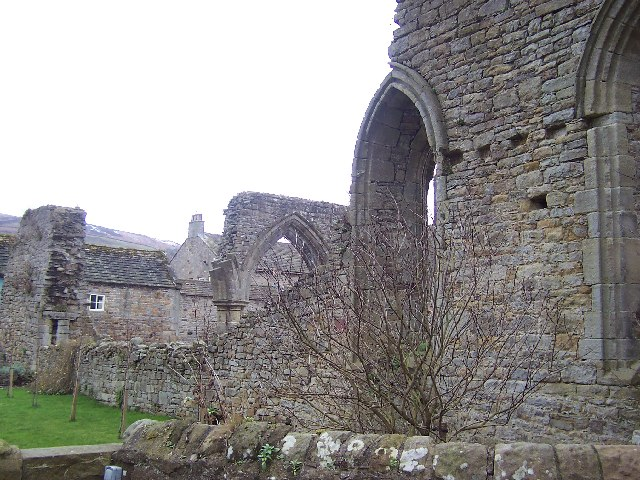
- Remains of Coverham Abbey

- Location within North Yorkshire
- Civil parish: Coverham with Agglethorpe
- Unitary authority: North Yorkshire
- Ceremonial county: North Yorkshire
- Region: Yorkshire and the Humber
- Country: England
- Sovereign state: United Kingdom
- Post town: LEYBURN
- Postcode district: DL8
- Police: North Yorkshire
- Fire: North Yorkshire
- Ambulance: Yorkshire

Coverham is a village in Coverdale in the Yorkshire Dales in North Yorkshire, England. It lies 2 miles (3.2 km) west of the town of Middleham.

== History ==
Coverham was mentioned in Domesday Book in 1086, when it was held by Count Alan of Brittany. It became the centre of a large parish in the Honour of Richmond in the North Riding of Yorkshire, which included the townships of Coverham with Agglethorpe, Caldbergh with East Scrafton, Carlton Highdale, Carlton Town, Melmerby and West Scrafton. All these townships became separate civil parishes in 1866.

In the 2011 Census, Coverham village was included in the Parish of Melmerby, which had 213 people in it. In 2015, North Yorkshire County Council estimated that the population of Coverham with Agglethorpe was 90.

== Notable buildings ==
The ruins of the Grade I listed Coverham Abbey are in the village; the site has no access to the public.

Holy Trinity Church dates from the 13th century and became redundant in 1985. It is a Grade II* listed building. It is said to have a slope at its south-east corner whereby the gradient is so steep, that even though you are in the graveyard you cannot see the church nor hear the bells for the adjacent waterfall. Triple Crown winning jockey Harry Grimshaw is buried in the churchyard.

Coverham Bridge, a medieval bridge over the River Cover, is a Scheduled Ancient Monument and Grade II* listed building.

The tourist attraction Forbidden Corner, a folly garden, is also in the village.
