= Coverham Abbey =

Premonstratensian monastery in England

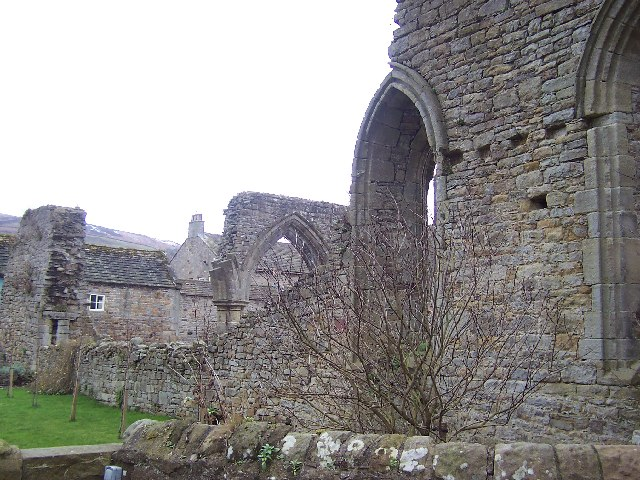
- Coverham Abbey
- Interactive map of Coverham Abbey

Monastery information
- Order: Premonstratensian
- Established: 1190
- Disestablished: 1536
- Mother house: St Mary and St. Martial at Newsham

People
- Founder: Helewisia de Glanville

Site
- Location: Coverham
- Grid reference: SE 10601 86404

Coverham Abbey, North Yorkshire, England, was a Premonstratensian monastery that was founded at Swainby in 1190 by Helewisia, daughter of the Chief Justiciar Ranulf de Glanville. It was refounded at Coverham in about 1212 by her son Ranulf fitzRalph, who had the body of his mother reinterred in the chapter house at Coverham.

There is some evidence that the during the first half of the 14th century the abbey and its holdings were attacked by the Scots, with the abbey itself being virtually destroyed. Later in that century there is a record of there being fifteen canons plus the abbot in residence.

The abbey ruins are a Scheduled Ancient Monument and a Grade I listed building.

== Swainby Abbey ==
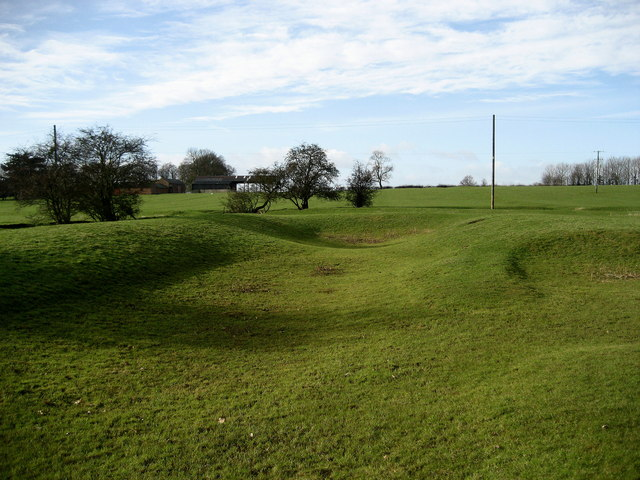
Site of the abbey (2007)

Swainby Abbey (54°15′53.1″N 1°29′05.4″W) was a Premonstratensian abbey at Swainby in North Yorkshire, England. It was founded in 1187 or 1188 by Helewise, the daughter of Ranulph de Glanville, Sheriff of Yorkshire and later Justiciar for King Henry II. She was the wife of Robert, Lord of Middleham. In 1195, Helewise was buried at the abbey. The monastery was moved to Coverham in 1202.

== Dissolution and remains ==
In the years leading up to dissolution, Coverham Abbey had been reduced to a modest size with fewer than a dozen monks, whose lands and comforts were managed by their monastic bailiff, Edward Loftus, father of the future Archbishop Adam Loftus. Early in 1536, the King’s receiver William Blytheman, assisted by the Abbey's last seneschal Thomas Wraye, (Note: Thomas Wraye was the father of the future Sir Christopher Wray (Chief Justice of the King's Bench 1574–1592) sent inspectors to the Abbey to search for misdemeanours, record rents and compile an inventory of possessions, no doubt ably assisted by Loftus. (Note: the Abbey had been depleted following years of Scots raids. But 1536 also marked a change in fortunes for the Loftus family, possibly through the gift of a grateful Abbot from years of service or redirected by Loftus himself, but it appears that Edward continued managing the estate on behalf of the King after dissolution until his death in 1541) By April, the Abbot was granted a pension, the monks offered the chance to recant their vows and the monastery was stripped of all value, including “781 oz. of silver plate and 3 oz. Gold” included 6 brass bells and all the lead stripped from the roofs. What was left was sold to Humphrey Orme twenty years later and rapidly fell into ruin.

The principal surviving remains include the ruins of the church and the guesthouse, which were incorporated into two houses: Garth Cottage, and another house built on the site in 1674. This was replaced in the late 18th century by the current building known as Coverham Abbey House but still retains the surviving monastic features. It is in stone, and has a stone slate roof with stone copings and shaped kneelers. There are two storeys and an L-shaped plan, with a main range of five bays. On the south front is a Doric doorway with an entablature, a fanlight and an open pediment. The windows are sashes, the window above the door is tripartite and has a moulded hood mould. The older range is lower and on the east front is a long Latin inscription.

The ruins of the gatehouse at the entry to the grounds of Coverham Abbey are in stone with a stone slate roof, and consist of an archway and flanking gatehouse buildings. The arch is semicircular with two chamfered orders and moulded imposts. The buildings each has a small vent and a chamfered window, and the sides have been converted into barrel vaulted chambers for animal shelters.

There are many sculptural remains preserved. Two stone effigies have been set against a garden wall at Coverham Abbey House. The right effigy is the earlier, depicting a knight in chain mail with a surcoat, a long sword and a shield. The hands are folded in prayer, and the legs are crossed. The left effigy dates from the early 14th century, and depicts a knight, also in chain mail with a surcoat, a sword and a shield, and with crossed legs. Behind it is a scene of a stag chased by two hounds, with a third hound biting the shield.

The site is usually inaccessible to the public but can be glimpsed from the churchyard of Coverham's redundant medieval parish church, Holy Trinity Church, Coverham.

The exterior of the abbey and its grounds doubled as the home of Mrs Bond in two early episodes of the BBC television series All Creatures Great and Small.

== Burials ==
- Geoffrey le Scrope (1285–1340) and his wife Ivetta De Ros
- Ralph Neville, 1st Baron Neville de Raby
- Ranulph Neville, 1st Baron Neville

== See also ==
- Grade I listed buildings in North Yorkshire (district)
- Listed buildings in Coverham with Agglethorpe

== Sources ==
- 'Premonstratensian houses: Abbey of Coverham', A History of the County of York: Volume 3 (1974), pp. 243–45.
- Anthony New. 'A Guide to the Abbeys of England And Wales', p123-25. Constable.
