= Arris =

Sharp edge formed by the intersection of two surfaces

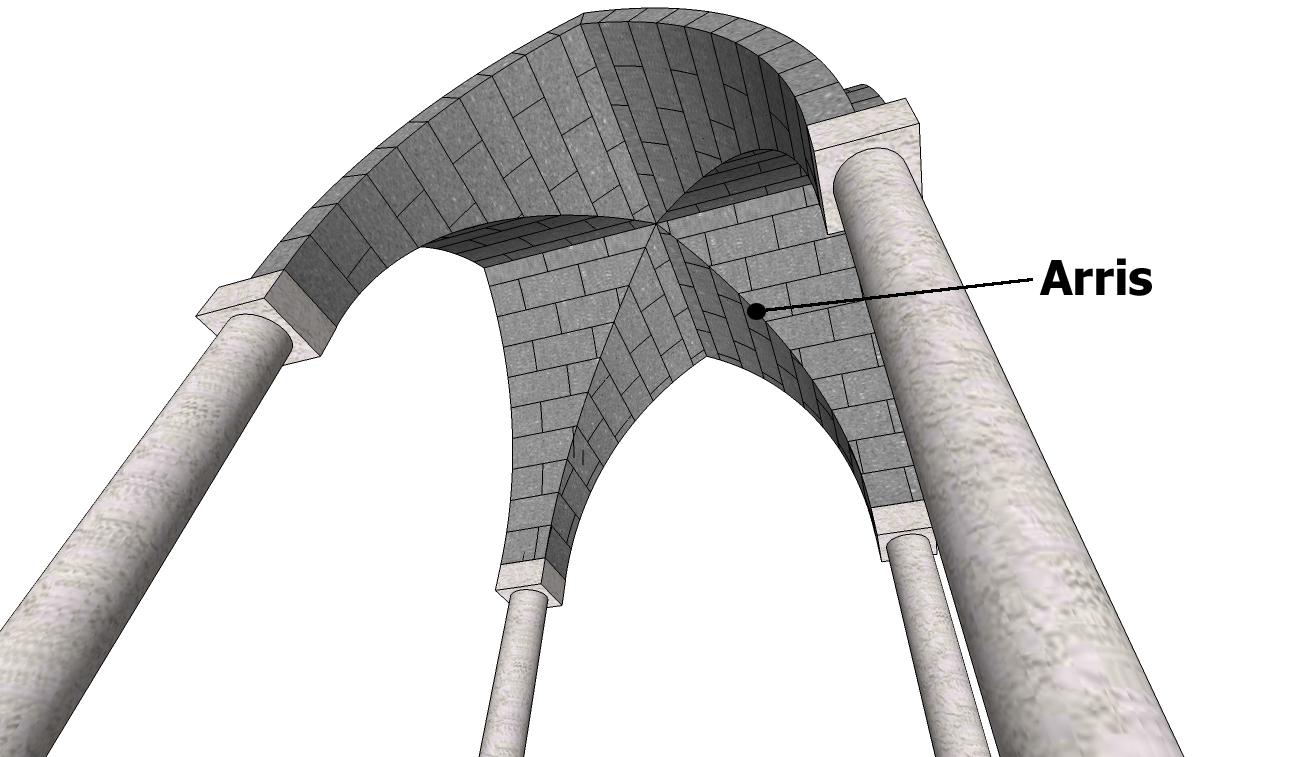
Underside of a groin vault showing the arris

In architecture, an arris is the sharp edge formed by the intersection of two surfaces, such as the corner of a masonry unit; the edge of a timber in timber framing; the junction between two planes of plaster or any intersection of divergent architectural details. The term also refers to the raised edges which separate the flutings in a Doric column.

The origin of the term arris is from the Latin arista, meaning the beard or the ear of grain or the bone of a fish. See also arête.

An arris rail is a structural element with a 45-degree, isosceles right-angled triangle cross section. Arris rails are usually made of wood and are manufactured by cutting a length of square-section timber lengthwise diagonally. They are used for structures that require joining two timbers at right angles; for example, connecting wooden posts and beams.

Another common use is for the horizontal rails of timber fences, since the diagonal edges prevent water from collecting on top of the wood and thus rotting the timber. It also adds an element of security, since the fence is harder to climb.
