= Coverdale, North Yorkshire =

Valley of the Yorkshire Dales, England

Coordinates: 54.251°N 1.902°W

Coverdale
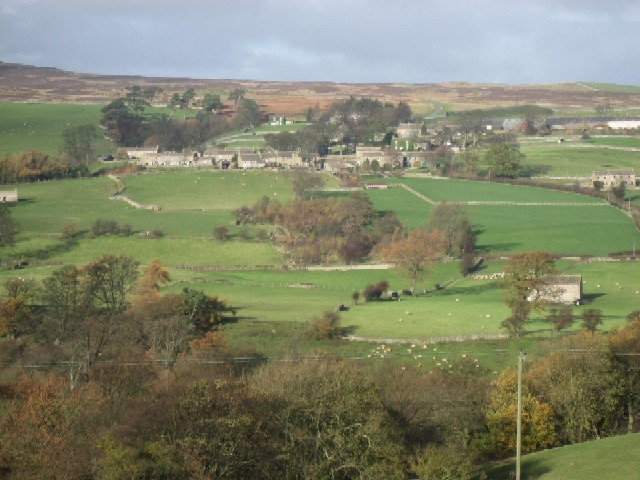
- View of Coverdale looking towards Melmerby

- Location within North Yorkshire
- OS grid reference: SD055825
- Civil parish: Carlton Highdale Carlton Town Coverham with Agglethorpe Middleham West Scrafton
- Unitary authority: North Yorkshire
- Ceremonial county: North Yorkshire
- Region: Yorkshire and the Humber
- Country: England
- Sovereign state: United Kingdom
- Postcode district: DL8
- Police: North Yorkshire
- Fire: North Yorkshire
- Ambulance: Yorkshire

Coverdale is a dale in the far east of the Yorkshire Dales, North Yorkshire, England. It takes its name from the River Cover, a tributary of the River Ure. The dale runs south-west from the eastern end of Wensleydale to the dale head at a pass, known as Park Rash Pass, between Great Whernside to the south and Buckden Pike to the north. It is accessible by a single track road, which runs the length of the dale and over the pass to Kettlewell in Wharfedale. The name is taken from that of the River Cover, which is of Brittonic origin. Ekwall suggested that it might mean "hollow stream", but more recently Andrew Breeze has argued that it is cognate with Welsh gofer "streamlet".

== History ==
An abbey was founded at Coverham in the 14th century by Ralph, son of Robert, Lord of Middleham. The order that it belonged to was Premonstratensian (or White Canons) and was formally dissolved in 1536. Whilst some of the ruins are still extant, it is not open to the general public.

In the 18th century, the road through Coverdale from Kettlewell to Middleham was used as the route of coaches between London and Richmond. The route came north through Halifax, Keighley, Skipton and Cracoe as part of its 251-mile (404 km) journey.

The valley gives its name to a variant of Yorkshire Dales cheese, produced at the Wensleydale Creamery in Hawes. Coverdale cheese is of the same general texture and flavour as Wensleydale, but thought by some to be slightly sourer and therefore possessing greater 'edge'.

The River Cover meets its confluence with the River Ure at the hamlet of Coverbridge which consists of Clarkson's farm and the Coverbridge Pub, an ancient travellers inn on the road from Jervaulx Abbey to Middleham. The Coverbridge Pub has at least two claims to fame including having been the hiding place of monks who kept alive the recipe of Wensleydale cheese during the sacking of Jervaulx Abbey by troops loyal to King Henry VIII, and, the scene of the first formally recorded game of cricket in 1706. In 2006 the Coverbridge Cricket Festival celebrated the 300th anniversary in a massive spectacle of cricket supported by the Red Arrows and a Spitfire and Hurricane of the RAF with musical support provided by the band of the Royal Regiment of Fusiliers. A Coverbridge team of dalesmen played the visiting Awali Camels team on tour from the Kingdom of Bahrain.

== Tourism ==
- Braithwaite Hall, a 17th-century farmhouse that was built in 1667. It has been let out to tenant farmers who also mined coal and quarried limestone in the surrounding area.
- Forbidden Corner, a series of tunnels, caves, grottoes and walled gardens that join to form a 3 dimensional maze.

== Settlements ==
- Agglethorpe
- Braidley
- Caldbergh
- Carlton
- Coverham
- East Scrafton
- Gammersgill
- Horsehouse
- Melmerby
- Middleham
- Swineside
- West Scrafton
