= River Cover =

River in North Yorkshire, England

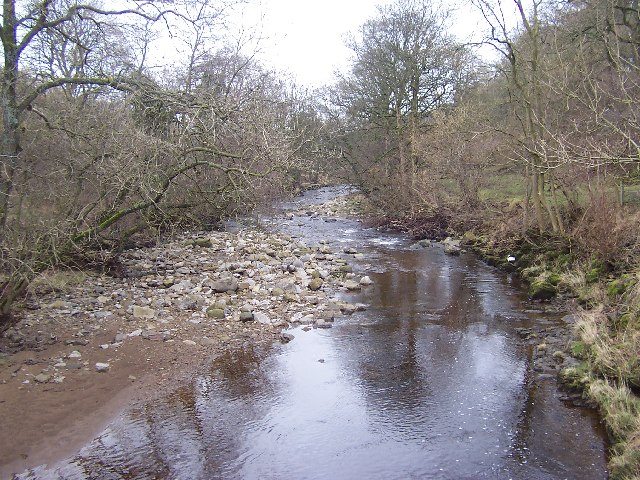
- River Cover from St Simons Bridge

Location
- Country: England

Physical characteristics
- Source
  - location: Great Hunters Sleets nr Woodale
  - coordinates: 54°11′2″N 2°1′29″W
  - elevation: 1,598 feet (487 m)
- Mouth
  - location: River Ure nr Middleham
  - coordinates: 54°16′43″N 1°46′25″W
  - elevation: 322 feet (98 m)
- Length: 22 km (14 mi)

The River Cover is a river in the Yorkshire Dales in North Yorkshire, England. The Yorkshire Dales Rivers Trust has a remit to conserve the ecological condition of the River Cover. The river forms a limestone dale with ancient woodlands.

== Course ==
The source of the river lies in the shake holes that are found between Buckden Pike and Great Whernside that feed many small gills, such as East Stone Gill, West Stone Gill and Downs Gill. Where these conjoined flows meet Hazel Bank Gill is where the river becomes known as the River Cover. It flows in a north-east direction past Woodale, Braidley and Horsehouse. It turns to the north north-east towards Gammersgill before returning north-east between West Scrafton and Carlton, North Yorkshire. Immediately east of Agglethorpe, the river turns east until it joins the River Ure south-east of Middleham.

The river flows north eastwards for 14 miles (22 km) and drains an area covering over 20,130 acres (8,146 ha).

== Ecology ==
The river is home for brown trout and grayling.

== Geology ==
The river runs along a U-shaped glacial valley over Great Scar limestone with Yoredale rock forming the valley sides. It is a gently meandering river with a characteristic stony channel and beaches leading to wooded low banks. The wooded areas extend up into the many gills that join the river.

== Lists ==
=== Tributaries ===
- Hem Gill Brook
- Middle Gill
- Slape Gill
- Crab Gill
- Burn Gill
- West Gill
- Lords Gill
- Ridge Gill
- Fall Gill
- Slate Gill
- Pear Tree Gill
- Short Gill
- Side Gill
- Harkers Gill
- Dixon Gill
- Arkleside Gill
- Deer Close Gill
- Hindlethwaite Gill
- Fleemis Gill
- Turn Beck
- Goodmans Gill
- Great Gill
- Clint Gill
- Thorow Gill
- Humph Gill
- South Runner
- Caldbergh Gill
- Red beck Gill

=== Settlements ===
- Woodale
- Braidley
- Arkleside
- Horsehouse
- Swineside
- Gammersgill
- West Scrafton
- Carlton
- Melmerby
- Caldbergh
- Agglethorpe
- Middleham

=== Crossings ===
- Cover Bridge
- Braidley Footbridge
- Arkleside Bridge
- Footbridge near Hindlethwaite Hall
- Track to Hindlethwaite Hall
- Hall Farm stepping stones
- Nathwaite Bridge
- Caygill Footbridge
- Bird Ridding Bridge (footbridge)
- St Simon's Bridge (footbridge)
- Coverham Bridge
- Hullo Bridge (footbridge)
- Straight Lane stepping stones
- A6108 Cover Bridge

== Gallery ==
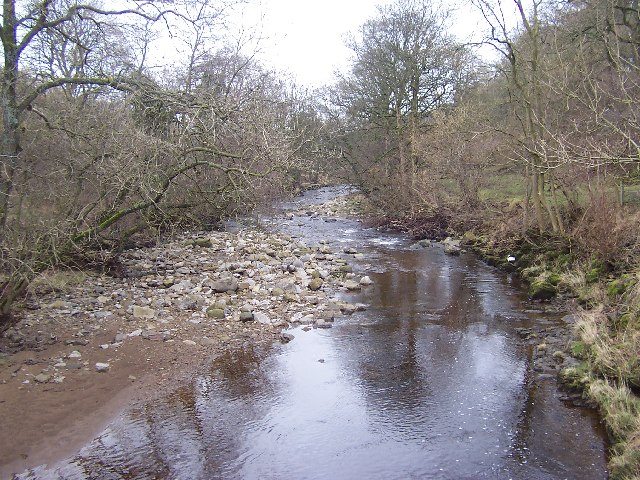
River Cover from St Simons Bridge

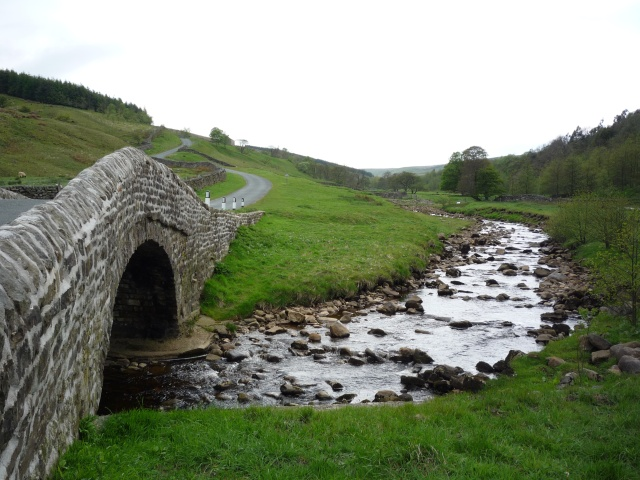
River Cover

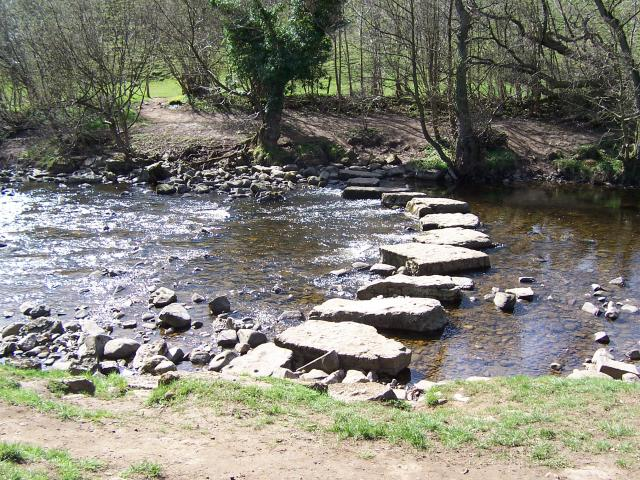
Stepping stones over the River Cover

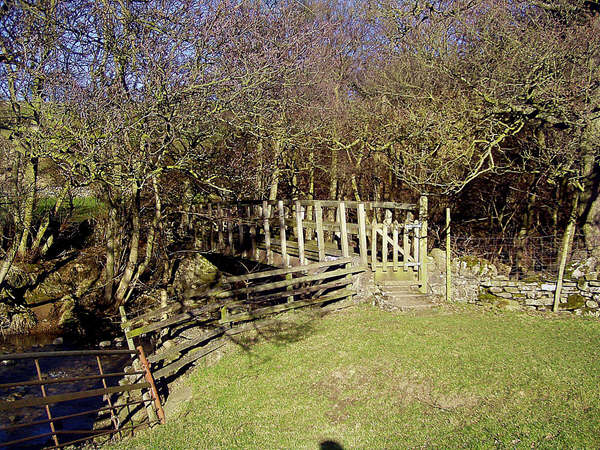
Caygill footbridge over the River Cover

== See also ==
- Coverdale
- Rivers of the United Kingdom
