= Hang West =

Former administrative division of Yorkshire, England

- Wapentake
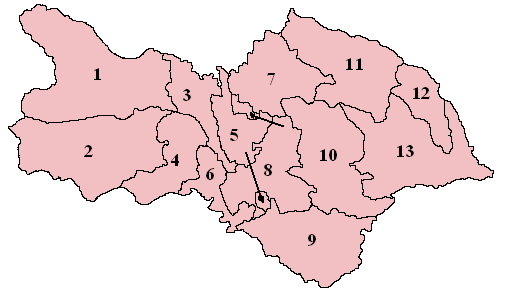
- Wapentakes of North Yorkshire. Hang West is labelled as number 2.
- Subdivisions
  - Type: 12 parishes

Hang West was a Wapentake (Hundred) in the North Riding of Yorkshire.

The Wapentake measured 25 miles (40 km) across (from west to east) and was 13 miles (21 km) from north to south. It was bordered on its eastern side by Hang East, the West Riding of Yorkshire on the southern side with Westmorland and the West Riding on the Western side.

== Etymology ==
The name of Hang West name derives from the meeting place of the Wapentake, which was situated at Hang Bank, halfway between Hutton Hang and the village of Finghall. The name of the wapentake is first attested in 1157 as Hangeschire. Hang is believed to derive from the Old English word hængra ('wooded slope').

== Settlements ==
The table below lists the settlements within the Hang West Wapentake. These are as listed in Bulmer's North Riding.

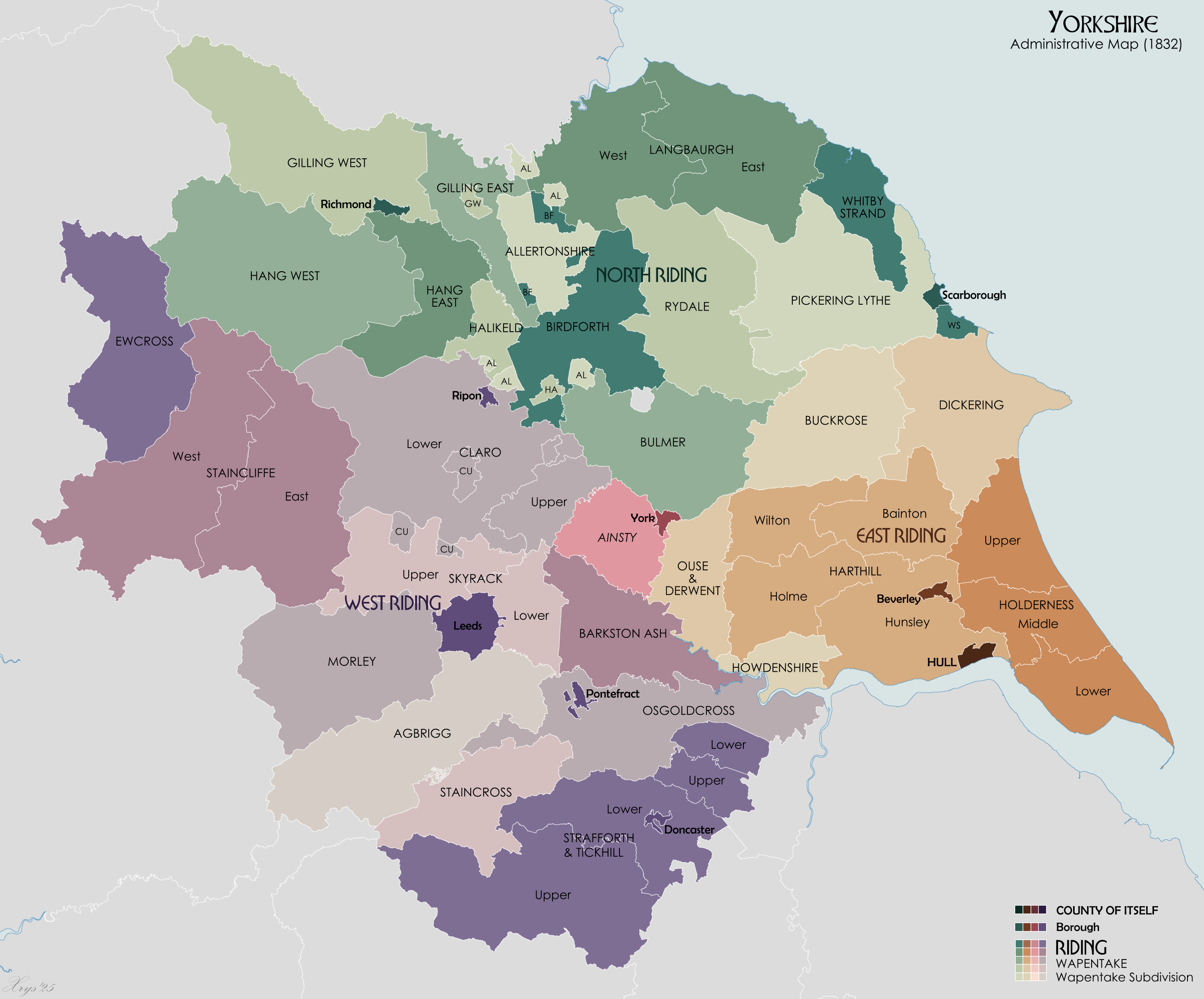
Yorkshire Administrative Map 1832. Hang West is a pale green colour on the top left

Abbotside High	Constable Burton	Middleham
Abbotside Low	Coverham with Agglethorpe	Newbiggin
Askrigg	Downholme	Preston-under-Scar
Aysgarth	Ellerton Abbey	Redmire
Bainbridge	Finghall with Hutton Hang and Akebar	Scrafton West
Barden	Garriston	Spennithorne
Bellerby	Grinton (Note: Only a small part of Grinton was in Hang West)	Stainton
Bishopdale	Harmby	Thoraldby
Brompton Patrick (Note: Now known as Patrick Brompton) (Note: Was only partly in Hang West; most of the village was in Hang East)	Hauxwell East	Thornton Rust
Burton-cum-Walden	Hauxwell West	Thornton Steward
Caldbridge with East Scrafton	Hawes	Walburn
Canton	Hudswell	Wensley
Carlton Highdale	Hunton	Witton East Within
Carperby	Leyburn	Witton West Without
Castle Bolton	Melmerby	Witton West
