= Church of St Andrew, Finghall =

Anglican church in North Yorkshire, England

St Andrew's Church, Finghall
- The Parish Church of St Andrew, Finghall
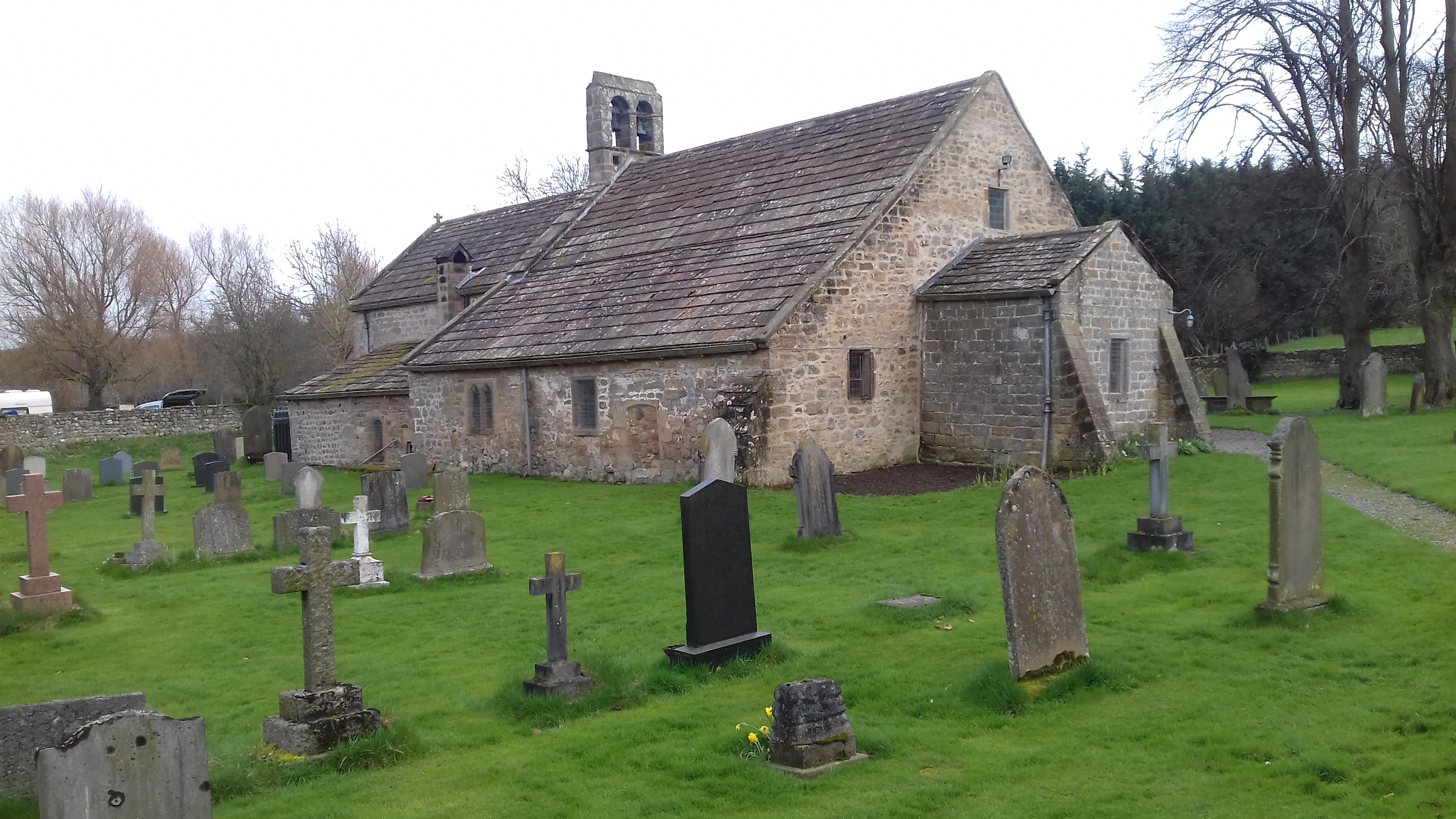
- The Church of St Andrew, Finghall

- Location in North Yorkshire
- 54°18′24.2″N 1°42′30.5″W
- OS grid reference: SE182897
- Location: Finghall
- Country: England
- Denomination: Church of England
- Website: Webpage

History
- Status: Active
- Dedication: St Andrew

Architecture
- Architectural type: Early English

Administration
- Diocese: Leeds
- Archdeaconry: Richmond and Craven
- Deanery: Wensley
- Parish: Finghall

Clergy
- Rector: Reverend Chris Lawton

Listed Building – Grade II*
- Designated: 13 February 1967
- Reference no.: 1131477

The Parish Church of St Andrew, Finghall, (Note: The village and parish is sometimes spelt in its archaic fashion of Fingall, dropping the 'H'. The name derives from Finegala, Finyngale or Fingala which means the Halh (land or area) of Fina's people. At some point the spelling was changed to include the 'H'.) is the parish church for the village of Finghall in North Yorkshire, England. The building is on the site of a much earlier Anglo-Saxon church and has some remnants of that era incorporated into the building, though the present structure dates back only to the 12th century. The church is nearer to the hamlet of Akebar than it is to Finghall, which is 0.5 miles (0.8 km) to the south, because the church was originally in a medieval village that was deserted when ravaged by plague. The building is now a grade II* listed structure and is still used for worship.

== History ==
The Church of St Andrew, Finghall, was built in the Early English style in the late 12th century and is now grade II* listed. It has a tower to the west with a nave, chancel and a rare double bell holder (bell-cot) situated on the centre of the church roof. The roof is described as being very low, with one writer stating that "[it comes] nearly to the ground," and whilst one bell is undated, the other shows it to have been cast in 1620. Some elements are thought to be Anglo-Saxon in nature, including a blocked doorway into the nave dated to around 1140 and an Anglo-Saxon cross-head from the 9th century built into the chancel. The church was rebuilt in the 14th century and smaller additions were made in the 18th and 19th centuries with a complete restoration in 1904. Further restorations were undertaken in 1959 and 1964.

The most recent restoration was carried out in 2000, when the commandment boards were restored. The commandment boards were instituted by Queen Elizabeth I in the 16th century but Finghall didn't get theirs until the middle of the 18th century.

In 1801 the Reverend Luke Yarker employed several people as musicians and singers in the church. The musicians were supplanted in 1865 by a harmonium, which was replaced in 1894 by an organ that had previously been in Constable Burton Hall.

The church is next to Leeming Beck (named Bedale Beck further down the valley) and was formerly in an Anglo-Saxon village. As with other Deserted Medieval Villages (DMVs), the belief was that the plague was a water-borne infection and so the villagers moved to the present site of Finghall village 0.5 miles (0.8 km) to the south of the church. This had led historians to label such places of worship as 'Plague Churches'.

The church was patronised by the Fitzhugh and the Wyvill families. Other notable families were patrons of the church and were afforded the right of advowson. The Scrope family lost this right in 1415 when their lands were confiscated (including Finghall church) by the crown on account of Henry Scrope's involvement in the 1415 plot to murder King Henry V. Scrope was executed at Southampton for this.

Two of the graves in the churchyard belong to military airmen. One is of a Royal Flying Corps airman who was the only son of the vicar of Finghall at that time. E.H.G. Sharples died in January 1918 in a training accident. The other grave is from the Second World War and is that of Flying Officer N.J.M. Barry. (Note: Barry was South African by birth and when he was shot down over Kent in 1940 he was a pilot in 501 Squadron. Barry was buried in Finghall because his brother was living in Bedale at the time.)

The church is in a benefice with five other churches: St Gregory's (Crakehall), St Mary's (Hornby), St Michael's (Spennithorne), St Oswald's (Hauxwell) and St Patrick's (Patrick Brompton). Together these six churches are collectively known as Lower Wensleydale.

== Vicars at Finghall ==
Below is a list of rectors of Finghall. At some point in the late twentieth century the incumbent at Patrick Brompton became the vicar for the extended parish.

- John de Segbrook - 1368
- Will Lyllforth
- Will Foxholes - 1420
- Roger Parker - 1457
- John Taylor
- Peter Conder
- William Typping - 1541
- Lacell Routh - 1572
- Reginald Lancaster - 1587
- Matthew Levett - 1622
- Henry Paget
- Robert Smith - 1665
- Henry Raper - 1710
- Thomas Nelson - 1735
- Luke Yarker - 1776
- Nicholas Bourne - 1803
- Edward Wyvill - 1820
- George Henry Ray - 1869
- Henry Milner Sharples - 1893
- Walter Hawkesworth Fawkes - 1920 (held in plurality with the parish of East Hauxwell)
- John William de la Poer Beresford-Peirse - 1944
- Dominic Thomas Reynolds Carlin - 1947
- Joseph Nicholls Jory - 1954
- Benjamin William Crawford - 1971
- William Frederick Greatham - 1975
- Raymond Joseph Pearson - 1982
- David James Christie - 1995
- William John Hulse - 2002
- Bryan Stanley Dixon - 2012 (Held in plurality with the parishes of Patrick Brompton, Hornby & Crakehall)
- Robin David Christopher Lawton - 2017

== See also ==
- Grade II* listed churches in North Yorkshire (district)
- Listed buildings in Finghall
