= The Old Rectory, Patrick Brompton =

Building in Patrick Brompton, North Yorkshire, England

Coordinates: 54°18′44″N 1°39′42″W

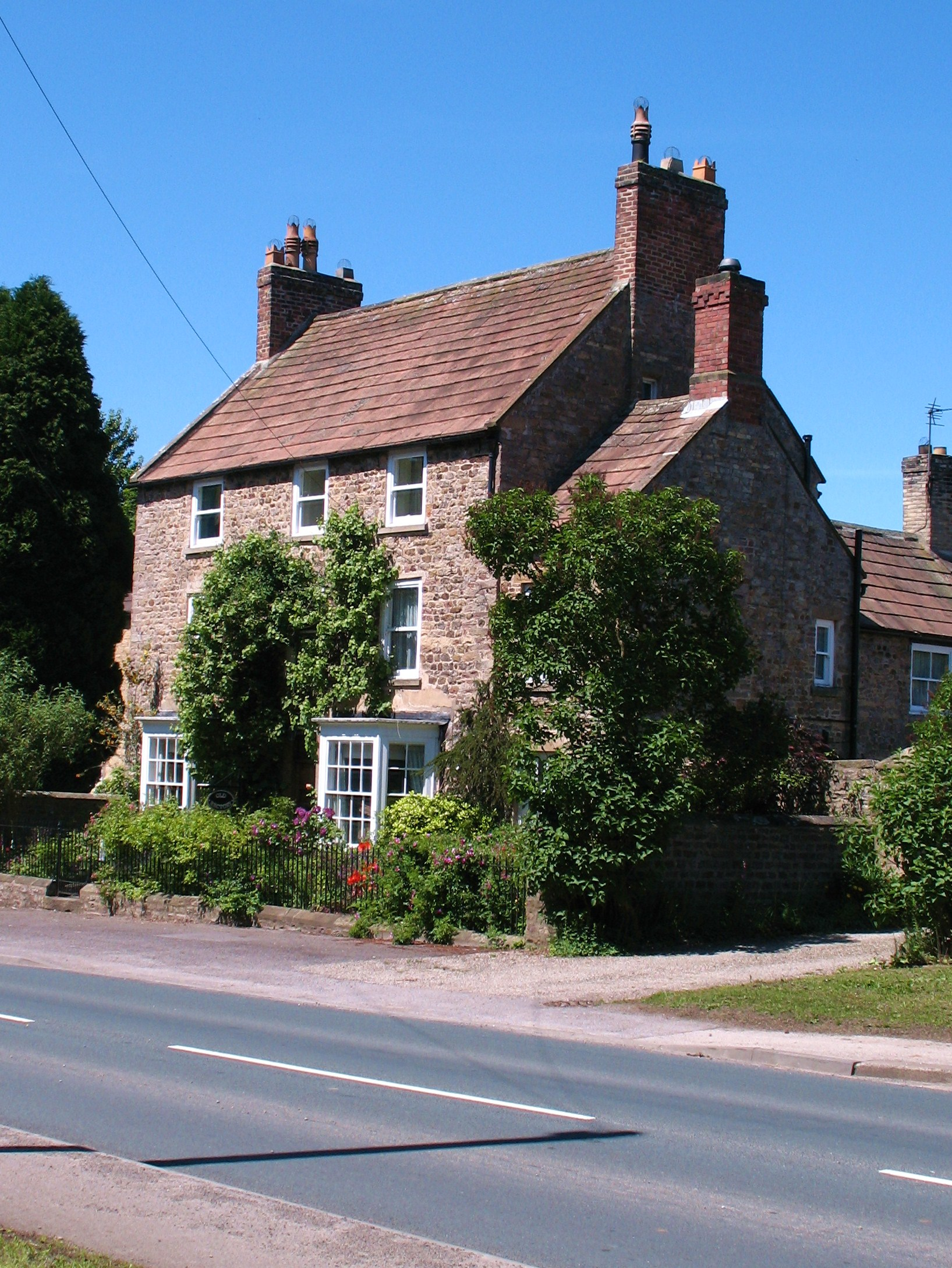
The building, in 2010

The Old Rectory is a historic building in Patrick Brompton, a village in North Yorkshire, in England.

The house was probably built in about 1700, then altered in the 18th century, and extended to the right in the 19th century. It became the rectory of St Patrick's Church, Patrick Brompton in 1908. A conservatory was added in the early 21st century. In 2013, the house was marketed for sale for £795,000, at which time it had an entrance hall, drawing room, dining room, kitchen, library, six bedrooms, and an attached two-bedroom cottage at the rear. The building was grade II listed, along with the cottage, and a wall and railing, in 1987.

The building is constructed of stone and has a stone slate roof with stone coping. It has three storeys, cellars and attics, a main range with three bays, a two-storey bay on the right, and a rear wing. In the centre is a doorway with a chamfered surround, flanked by canted bay windows, and the other windows are sashes. In front of the house is a low stone wall with triangular coping and wrought iron railings, and a gate with spiked bars and standards with urn finials. Inside, several early doors survive.

== See also ==
- Listed buildings in Patrick Brompton
