= Patrick Brompton Hall =

Building in Patrick Brompton, North Yorkshire, England

Coordinates: 54°18′40″N 1°39′46″W

Patrick Brompton Hall, also known as Dalesend, is a historic building in Patrick Brompton, a village in North Yorkshire, in England.

The country house was built in the early 18th century, for Gregory Elsley, to serve as the rectory of St Patrick's Church. It was altered and extended in 1901. In the mid-20th century, it was owned by Billy Nevett, then in 1958 it was purchased by the Ropner family. It has been grade II* listed since 1967. In 2024, it was marketed for sale for £3.95 million, at which time it had four reception rooms, a breakfast room, kitchen, larder, pantry, pool room, swimming pool, ten bedrooms, an attic room, stables, and 7 acres (2.8 ha) of grounds.

The house is built of sandstone, with a stone slate roof and stone copings. The central block has three storeys and five bays, with flanking single-storey two-bay wings, a rear outshut and a rear wing. The garden front has a plinth, quoins, string courses, a cornice, and a parapet with corner finials. The central doorway has an architrave, a fanlight, and a keystone. This is flanked by fielded panels under a segmental pediment on consoles. The windows are sashes with architraves, moulded sills and keystones. On the left return is a bow window, and the right return has a square bay window, and a doorway with a triangular pediment. Inside, the entrance hall retains its original decoration, including a Roman tombstone brought from Cataractonium. The sitting room, dining room and billiard room have original plasterwork. The drawing room has a pine chimneypiece originally in Clumber Park.

== See also ==
- Grade II* listed buildings in North Yorkshire (district)
- Listed buildings in Patrick Brompton
