= Listed buildings in Crakehall =

Crakehall is a civil parish in the county of North Yorkshire, England. It contains 28 listed buildings that are recorded in the National Heritage List for England. Of these, one is listed at Grade II*, the middle of the three grades, and the others are at Grade II, the lowest grade. The parish contains the settlements of Great Crakehall, Little Crakehall and Kirkbridge, and the surrounding countryside. Most of the listed buildings are houses, cottages, farmhouses and associated structures, and the others include a church, a war memorial in the churchyard, a medieval cross, a boundary stone, watermills, a former chapel and a bridge.

== Key ==
| Grade | Criteria |
|---|---|
| II* | Particularly important buildings of more than special interest |
| II | Buildings of national importance and special interest |

== Buildings ==
| Name and location | Photograph | Date | Notes | Grade |
|---|---|---|---|---|
| White Cross; 54.29860°N 1.61860°W | | Medieval | The cross is on the southwest side of the A684 road. It consists of a vertical stone with a chamfered square shaft on a square base. | II |
| Crakehall Hall and walls 54.30560°N 1.62492°W | | Early 18th century | A stone house on a plinth, with chamfered quoins, a sill band, a moulded eaves band, and a hipped stone slate roof. There are three storeys, a symmetrical front of seven bays, and a three-storey rear wing. Three steps lead up to a central Doric porch with two pairs of columns on plinths, a fluted frieze, a cornice and blocking course, and a doorway with a fanlight. The windows are sashes with moulded architraves and keystones. On each side of the house is a brick quadrant wall with stone coping, ramped up at the end to stone piers with domed caps. In the centre of each wall is a doorway with a rusticated architrave and a double keystone. From the right-hand pier runs a high coped stone wall. | II* |
| Greyriggs and Sydal Cottage; 54.30531°N 1.62804°W | — | Early 18th century | The house and later cottage are in stone, with a slate roof, stone coping and shaped kneelers. There are two storeys and five bays, the left three bays forming the house. In the centre of the house is a doorway with a plain surround and a keystone, and the cottage has a doorway with a flat arch. The windows in both parts are sashes with flat arches. | II |
| Malt Shovel Cottage; 54.30662°N 1.63248°W | — | Early 18th century | A house and a cottage combined into one house, it is in rendered stone, and has a pantile roof with a stone slate course at eaves level, stone coping and shaped kneelers. There are two storeys, the main block has three bays and pilasters, to the right is a single-bay outshut, and to the left is the one-bay former cottage. In the centre is a doorway with a wide moulded architrave, a pulvinated frieze and a pediment, flanked by tripartite sash windows. Above the doorway is a sash window in a moulded architrave, flanked by sashes. The outbuilding contains a doorway, and in the former cottage are a doorway and casement windows. | II |
| Stables, Crakehall Hall; 54.30584°N 1.62487°W | — | Early to mid 18th century | The stable range is in stone with brick dressings, brick quoins, and a tile roof, hipped on the left. There are two storeys and ten bays, the right bay added later. In the ground floor are doorways, sash windows and one casement window. The middle seven bays of the original range have openings with flat brick arches and raised keystones. In the upper floor, apart from the right bay, each bay has a louvred opening with a fanlight, a flat brick arch and a keystone. | II |
| Hall Farmhouse; 54.30439°N 1.62475°W | — | Early to mid 18th century | The farmhouse is in stone with brick dressings, brick quoins, brick eaves, and a hipped pantile roof with stone slate at the eaves. There are two storeys and four bays, and a two-storey single-bay extension joined to the main block by a single-storey single-bay link. The second bay in the main block projects and contains a doorway with a fanlight under a round brick arch with a keystone, and the windows are sashes. In the link is a casement window, and the extension contains a horizontally-sliding sash. | II |
| Crakehall House; 54.30567°N 1.62616°W | | Mid 18th century | The house is in stone, with dressings in brick and stone, and a stone slate roof with stone coping and shaped kneelers. There are two storeys and a symmetrical front of five bays. In the centre is a carriage arch with a cambered head, infilled with a French window The windows are sashes with stone sills, flat brick arches, and keystones. | II |
| Barn northwest of Crakehall House; 54.30576°N 1.62654°W | — | Mid 18th century | The barn is in stone, with dressings in brick and stone, and a pantile roof with stone coping. There are two storeys and a single-storey gabled wing at right angles. The barn contains barn doors under segmental arches, steps leading to a granary door, and blocked openings. In the right return is a square dovecote opening with a lintel and a keystone. | II |
| Barn west of Crakehall House; 54.30562°N 1.62645°W | — | Mid 18th century | The barn is in stone, and has a pantile roof with stone coping and shaped kneelers. It contains two blind doorways with quoined surrounds and keystones. In the centre is a large buttress. | II |
| Firby House; 54.30430°N 1.62512°W | — | 18th century | A stone house with an eaves band and a stone slate roof. There are two storeys and four bays . The central doorway has a cambered brick arch, and the windows are casements with stone sills and brick soldier arches. | II |
| Guyzance; 54.30668°N 1.63195°W | — | Mid 18th century | A rendered house with a dentilled and moulded eaves cornice, and a stone slate roof with stone coping and a shaped kneeler on the right. There are two storeys and three bays. The central doorway has a wide moulded architrave, a pulvinated frieze and a segmental pediment. To its right is a bow window, and the other windows are sashes. | II |
| Barn, Hall Farm; 54.30462°N 1.62420°W | — | Mid 18th century | The barn is in stone, with dressings in brick and stone, and a pantile roof with stone coping and shaped kneelers. There are two storeys and three bays. It is a long building with the gable end facing the street as its principal front. This contains a large wagon door in a brick arch, with an impost band and a keystone. This flanked by blind doorways with flat brick arches, and above are blind square openings. In the gable there are vents in a diamond pattern. | II |
| Cottage to rear of St Edmund's Cottage; 54.30555°N 1.62802°W | — | Mid 18th century | Originally two cottages, later combined, and subsequently used for other purposes. It is in stone with a pantile roof, two storeys and two bays. The windows are sashes with stone sills. | II |
| The Willows; 54.30669°N 1.63213°W | — | Mid 18th century | A stone house with two storeys. The main block is rendered, with three bays, a dentilled and moulded eaves cornice, and a stone slate roof with stone coping and a shaped kneeler on the left. In the centre is a doorway with a wide moulded architrave, a pulvinated frieze and a segmental pediment. The windows are sashes. To the left and recessed is a single-bay wing in stone on a plinth, with a pantile roof. It contains a doorway with a fanlight in a round-arched recess, a casement window to the right, and in the upper floor is a horizontally-sliding sash window. | II |
| Hilltop Cottage; 54.30547°N 1.62767°W | — | Mid to late 18th century | A house and outbuilding later combined into one house, it is in stone with dressings in stone and brick and a pantile roof. There are two storeys and four bays. The doorway has a segmental brick arch, and to the right is a canted bay window with a frieze. To the left is a carriage arch with a basket-arched head. The other windows are a mix of casements and horizontally-sliding sashes. | II |
| Holly Cottage and Old Cottage; 54.30572°N 1.62588°W | — | Mid to late 18th century | A house, later two cottages, in stone, with quoins, and a pantile roof with stone coping and shaped kneelers. There are two storeys and four bays, the right bay slightly lower. On the front are two doorways, the left two bays contain sash windows, and the windows in the right two bays are casements. | II |
| Kirkbridge Mill; 54.30572°N 1.62588°W | — | Mid to late 18th century | A house and a watermill. The house is in brick with a dentilled cornice, and a roof of pantile and stone slate. There are two storeys and five bays. The doorway has a fanlight, to its left is a blocked segmental-arched doorway, and the windows are sashes. The mill is recessed slightly to the left, it is in stone and has two storeys, a pantile roof, and an L-shaped plan, with fronts of three and four bays. In the centre is a former doorway with a quoined surround and a double keystone, containing a casement window, and the other windows are also casements. | II |
| Village Farmhouse; 54.30517°N 1.62754°W | — | Mid to late 18th century | The farmhouse is in stone with brick dressings, and a stone slate roof with stone coping and shaped kneelers. There are storeys and three bays, and a single-storey single-bay wing on the left. The doorway has a three-pane fanlight and the windows are sashes. | II |
| Hawdene and Little Garth; 54.30609°N 1.62528°W | — | Late 18th century | A pair of rendered stone cottages with two storeys. Hawdene on the left has a pantile roof with stone coping and shaped kneelers. There are three bays and a central doorway. Little Garth is lower, with a tile roof, two bays, and a gabled porch. The windows in both cottages are horizontally-sliding sashes. | II |
| St Edmond's Cottage; 54.30557°N 1.62777°W | — | Late 18th century | The house is in stone, and has a tile roof with stone coping and a shaped kneeler on the right. There are two storeys and four bays. In the third bay is a doorway with a moulded surround, a raised plinth, imposts and a keystone. To its right is a casement window under a brick cambered arch, and the other windows are sashes under flat arches. In the left bay is a carriage entrance. | II |
| Boundary stone 54.30855°N 1.61362°W | | 1798 | A boundary stone or guide post on the east side of Catterick Langthorne, it consists of a square stone with a chamfered top. The stone is inscribed on three faces, and on the west face is also the date. | II |
| Former Chapel; 54.30424°N 1.62732°W | — | Early 19th century | The chapel, later used for other purposes and at one time a museum, is in stone on a plinth, with chamfered quoins, gutter brackets, and a hipped Welsh slate roof. There are two storeys and two bays. The central doorway has a round arch with rusticated voussoirs, flanked by sash windows with flat arches and similar voussoirs. Above the doorway is a tablet with a moulded architrave, flanked by round-arched sash windows. | II |
| Crakehall Corn Mill; 54.30655°N 1.62798°W | | Early 19th century | The corn watermill is in stone with a pantile roof. There are two storeys, three bays, and an outshut to the right containing the waterwheel. Steps lead up to a stable door in the left bay, and the windows are casements. | II |
| Crakehall Mill House; 54.30674°N 1.62817°W | | Early 19th century | The house is in rendered stone with a roof of pantile and stone slate. There are three storeys and two bays, and a lower single-bay wing to the right. In the centre of the main block is a doorway in a recessed surround with a fanlight and a cornice, flanked by canted bay windows with friezes and cornices. The windows in the middle floor and in the wing are sashes, and in the top floor they are casements. | II |
| High Mill Farmhouse; 54.30750°N 1.63669°W | — | Early 19th century | The farmhouse is in rendered stone with a pantile roof. There are two storeys and three bays. The doorway has a stone lintel, and the windows are sashes with stone sills and lintels. | II |
| Little Crakehall Bridge; 54.30577°N 1.62909°W | | 1829 | The bridge carries the A684 road over Bedale Beck. It is in stone and consists of three segmental arches. The bridge has voussoirs, cutwaters with a triangular section, a band, a plain parapet, and square end piers. | II |
| St Gregory's Church; 54.30470°N 1.62557°W | | 1840 | The church, designed by John Harper, is in stone with a Welsh slate roof. It consists of a four-bay nave, a south porch and a single-bay chancel. On the west gable is a bellcote that has two pointed arches with pointed heads each containing three bells, above which is a pierced trefoil and a cross. Under the bellcote is a clock. The windows are lancets, stepped along the sides, and at the east end are five lancets and a triangular blocked window above. | II |
| War memorial 54.30456°N 1.62582°W | | c. 1920 | The First World War memorial is in the churchyard of St Gregory's Church. It is in stone and consists of a Celtic cross on a domed base. There is detailed carving on the front of the cross head and on the shaft, and on the shaft is an inscription. On the base are the names of those lost in the war. | II |
