= Jonathan Rigg =

British tea planter and lexicographer

Jonathan Rigg was christened at St Patrick's in Patrick Brompton, Yorkshire on the 13 April 1809, the eldest child of Reverend Hugh Rigg and Maria Addison, originally of Westmorland. Reverend Hugh was the incumbent vicar at St Patrick's, where he served for 55 years.

As early as 1838 Jonathan became a tea grower and trader in West Java in the Dutch East Indies, in partnership with his mother's uncle, Robert Addison. Together they owned the Jasinga Estate plantation with Jonathan taking full control in 1853 and inheriting the property following Robert's death in 1862.

== Published works ==
Jonathan was a member of the Batavian Society of Arts and Sciences, an historian, amateur geologist and lexicographer. He authored several journal articles, including, Tiger Fight at Solo, recounting the story of an organised tiger fight he witnessed at Solo (modern Surakarta), the home of the Javanese rulers; Gunung Danka, or A Paradise on Earth, a Tale of Superstition; and Grand Exhibition of Batavia in 1853, a report on the Batavia exhibition at Hyde Park in London, published in The Journal of the Indian Archipelago and Eastern Asia. Also published are A Trip to Probolingo; Tour from Surabaya through Kediri, ‘Blitar, Antang, Malang and Passuruan, back to Sourabaya; and Ancient Javanese Inscriptions at Panataran. He also wrote a book on the geology of Java called Sketch of the Geology of Jasinga, published in 1838.

== The Sunda-English Dictionary ==
Jonathan Rigg's most important work was the first ever Sunda-English dictionary, A Dictionary of the Sunda Language of Java, which he published in 1862 and which remains in print today. The publishing of this dictionary in the Dutch East Indies by an Englishman, rather than a Dutchman, is considered to be as significant in terms of British dominance in the East Indies as the influences of Sir Stamford Raffles and John Crawfurd.

Moriyama writes:

Rigg's dictionary marks an epoch in the history of Sundanese language, showing once again that British succeeded in West Java, not the Dutch. It is not difficult to imagine the frustration felt by the Dutch towards the British. Although the Dutch had long been concerned with the East Indies and had studied them, the British, (Raffles and Crawfurd and here again Rigg) made the most important contribution to the scholarship of Sundanese language.

== Personal life ==
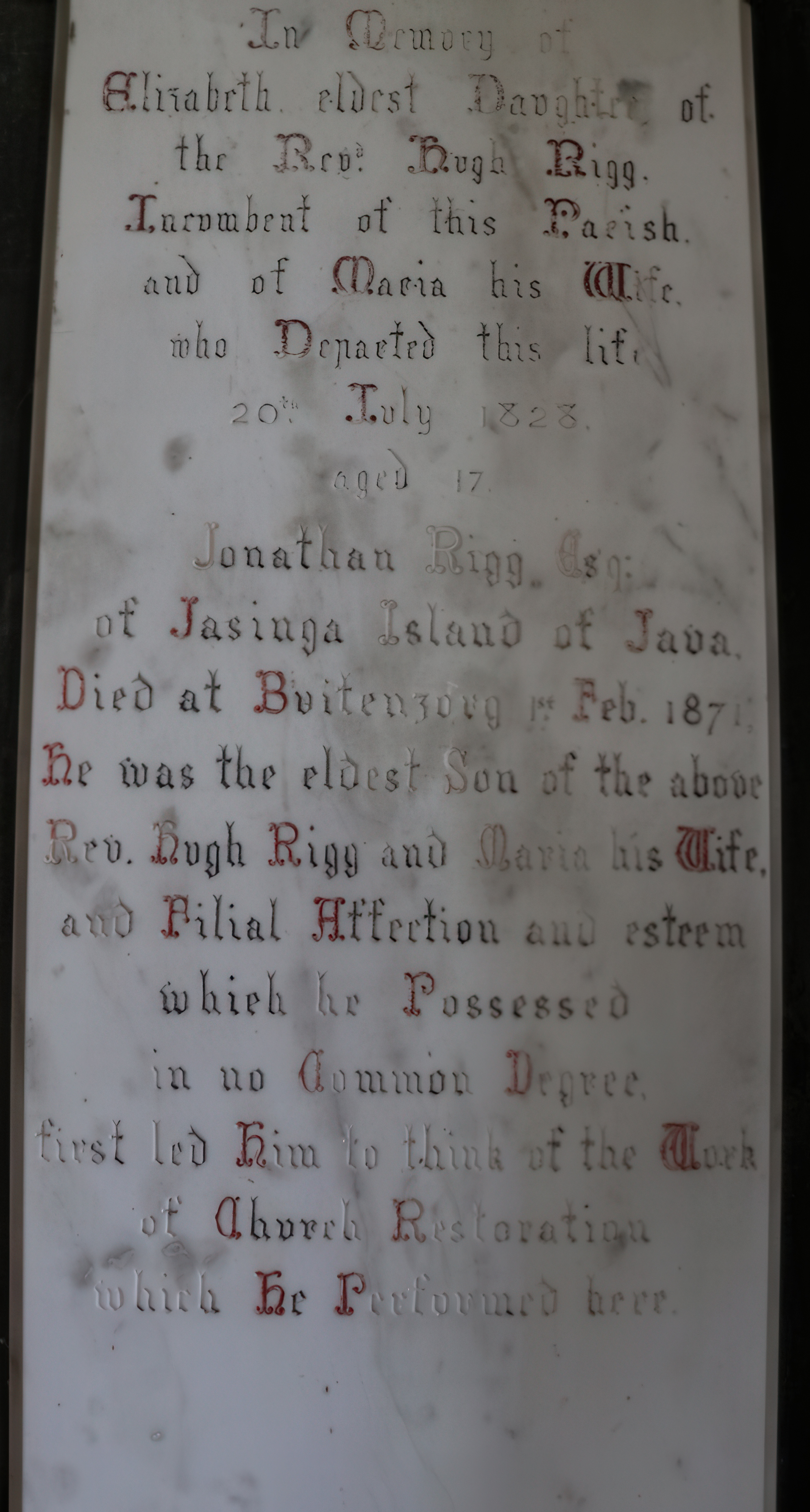
Jonathan Rigg's Memorial in St Patrick's Church, Patrick Brompton

In 1864 Jonathan funded the restoration of St Patrick's Church in Patrick Brompton, Yorkshire. His father, the Reverend Hugh Rigg, was the rector there for 55 years.

Jonathan had two children; a daughter, Emma, and son, Jonathan, who died aged 7 on 16 June 1855. Jonathan died at Buitenzorg (now known as Bogor), Java, on 1 February 1871, leaving the Jasinga plantation to his daughter. Emma married Edward Edwards and died without children on 27th November 1918 at Leamington Spa.
