= Listed buildings in Patrick Brompton =

Patrick Brompton is a civil parish in the county of North Yorkshire, England. It contains 15 listed buildings that are recorded in the National Heritage List for England. Of these, one is listed at Grade I, the highest of the three grades, one is at Grade II*, the middle grade, and the others are at Grade II, the lowest grade. The parish contains the village of Patrick Brompton and the surrounding area. The most important building in the parish is St Patrick's Church, which is listed together with a number of tombs in the churchyard. The other listed buildings consist of houses and associated structures, and a public house.

== Key ==
Grade	Criteria
I	Buildings of exceptional interest, sometimes considered to be internationally important
II*	Particularly important buildings of more than special interest
II	Buildings of national importance and special interest

== Buildings ==
Name and location	Photograph	Date	Notes	Grade
St Patrick's Church; 54.31140°N 1.66485°W		Late 12th century	The church has been altered and extended through the centuries, including a restoration in 1863–64 by G. Fowler Jones. It is built in sandstone with Westmorland slate roofs, and consists of a nave, north and south aisles, a south porch, a chancel with a vestry and organ chamber, and a west tower. The tower has three stages, a plinth, stepped diagonal buttresses, a west window with two lights and a hood mould, a clock face, two-light bell openings, and an embattled parapet.	I
The Old Rectory, Cottage, wall and railings 54.31215°N 1.66163°W		Late 17th to early 18th century (probable)	The building is in stone and has a stone slate roof with stone coping. There are three storeys, cellars and attics, a main range with three bays, a two-storey bay on the right, and a rear wing. In the centre is a doorway with a chamfered surround, flanked by canted bay windows, and the other windows are sashes. In front of the house is a low stone wall with triangular coping and wrought iron railings, and a gate with spiked bars and standards with urn finials.	II
Dalesend; 54.31126°N 1.66284°W	—	Early 18th century	A country house in sandstone, with a stone slate roof and stone copings. The central block has three storeys and five bays, with flanking single-storey two-bay wings, a rear outshut and a rear wing. The garden front has a plinth, quoins, string courses, a cornice, and a parapet with corner finials. The central doorway has an architrave, a fanlight, and a keystone. This is flanked by fielded panels under a segmental pediment on consoles. The windows are sashes with architraves, moulded sills and keystones. On the left return is a bow window, and the right return has a square bay window, and a doorway with a triangular pediment.	II*
North Field Farmhouse; 54.31650°N 1.65839°W	—	Early 18th century	The farmhouse is in stone, with quoins, and a pantile roof with a shaped kneeler and stone coping on the right. There are two storeys and four bays. The doorway has a quoined surround, and the windows are sashes, some horizontally-sliding.	II
Garden walls southwest of Dalesend; 54.30989°N 1.66488°W	—	Early to mid-18th century	The walls enclosing the kitchen garden are in stone, lined with red brick, and have a rectangular plan. They are about 3 metres (9.8 ft) in height, and have slab coping. There are segmental-arched openings with doorways in the southwest, northwest and northeast corners.	II
The Green Tree; 54.31123°N 1.66550°W		Mid-18th century	The public house is in roughcast stone, and has a pantile roof with stone slates at the eaves and stone copings. There are two storeys and five bays. The central doorway has a three-pane fanlight, and the windows are horizontally-sliding sashes.	II
Chest tomb 1 metre south of St Patrick's Church; 54.31139°N 1.66448°W	—	Mid to late 18th century (probable)	The chest tomb in the churchyard is in sandstone. On the sides are quatrefoil panels, and on the lid is an illegible inscription, and a sunken panel with a cherub.	II
Group of three chest tombs 54.31140°N 1.66456°W	—	Mid to late 18th century	The three chest tombs are in the churchyard of St Patrick's Church, and commemorate members of the Carter family. All have moulded lids with well-cut inscriptions. The two tombs furthest from the church also have fluting corner pilasters, and quatrefoil panels on the sides.	II
Hillside; 54.31212°N 1.66188°W	—	Mid to late 18th century	The house is in sandstone, and has a stone slate roof with stone coping and shaped kneelers. There are two storeys and three bays. The windows are sashes, the middle window on the ground floor a former doorway with a chamfered surround and interrupted jambs. On the right return is a doorway with a lintel containing inverted shields, and a large cornice on corbels.	II
Chest tomb 10 metres south of St Patrick's Church; 54.31128°N 1.66432°W	—	Late 18th century	The chest tomb in the churchyard is in sandstone. It has fluted corner pilasters, fielded panels on the sides, and a moulded lid with an illegible inscription.	II
Collinson chest tomb 54.31129°N 1.66441°W	—	c. 1800	The chest tomb is in the churchyard of St Patrick's Church, and commemorates Robert Collinson. It is in sandstone, and has corner pilasters, and fluted panels flanking circles with a sunflower. On the ends are fluted panels, and the lid is moulded and has an inscription.	II
Ashla; 54.31252°N 1.66001°W		Late 18th to early 19th century	The house is in stone, and has a stone slate roof with stone copings. There are two storeys and three bays. On the centre of the south front is a doorway with interrupted jambs and a fanlight. The ground floor contains canted bay windows, and on the upper floor are sash windows. At the rear is a round-arched stair window.	II
Laurel House; 54.31241°N 1.66021°W		Late 18th to early 19th century	The house is in stone, with a floor band, and an artificial stone slate roof with stone copings. There are two storeys and three bays. In the centre is a doorway with a fanlight, and above it is a blind window. The other windows are sashes.	II
Hewgill chest tomb 54.31125°N 1.66439°W	—	c. 1811	The chest tomb is in the churchyard of St Patrick's Church, and commemorates William Hewgill. It is in sandstone, with fluted corner pilasters. On the longer sides are panels with central paterae within quatrefoils within octagons, divided by fluted pilasters. The end panels have wavy edges, and on the moulded lid is a well-cut inscription.	II
Milner tombstone 54.31130°N 1.66471°W	—	c. 1828	The tombstone is in the churchyard of St Patrick's Church, and commemorates Simon Milner. It is in sandstone, with a well-cut inscription on a raised fielded panel with an egg-and-dart motif on the upper edge. This is flanked by columns with lotus bases and acanthus-leaf capitals, and above, there are crossed-leaves and foliage.	II
