= Listed buildings in Barden, Richmondshire =

Barden is a civil parish in the county of North Yorkshire, England. It contains two listed buildings that are recorded in the National Heritage List for England. Of these, one is listed at Grade II*, the middle of the three grades, and the other is at Grade II, the lowest grade. The parish contains the hamlet of Barden and the surrounding countryside, and the listed buildings consist of a manor house and a farmhouse.

== Key ==
Grade	Criteria
II*	Particularly important buildings of more than special interest
II	Buildings of national importance and special interest

== Buildings ==
Name and location	Photograph	Date	Notes	Grade
Old Hall; 54.33702°N 1.78162°W		Early 15th century	A manor house in stone, with quoins, and a stone slate roof with stone copings. There are two storeys and a T-shaped plan, consisting of a hall range and a cross-wing to the south. The south front has two bays, and a central doorway with a dated and initialled lintel. To its right is a four-light double-chamfered window with a hood mould, to the left is a two-light casement window set into a blocked doorway, and the upper floor contains casement windows. In the hall range is a blocked doorway with a four-centred arch and a hollow chamfered arris.	II*
Barden Lane Farmhouse; 54.33895°N 1.76803°W	—	Early 19th century	The farmhouse is in stone, and has a stone slate roof with stone copings. There are two storeys and three bays. In the centre is a doorway with a chamfered quoined surround, and the windows are sashes. To the left is a lower bay in two storeys, with stone coping and a shaped kneeler to the left, and it contains horizontally-sliding sash windows.	II
