= Crakehall Hall =

Listed building in North Yorkshire, England

Coordinates: 54.3056°N 1.6249°W

The building, in 2010

Crakehall Hall is a historic building in Crakehall, a village in North Yorkshire, England.

The building was constructed in the early 18th century. Nikolaus Pevsner describes it as "looking competent and sensible". Jean Burdon, who later ran a scheme for disabled riders, was born in the hall in 1924. The house was Grade II* listed in 1966, along with its garden walls. It was restored in the 2020s.

The house is built of stone on a plinth, with chamfered quoins, a sill band, a moulded eaves band, and a hipped stone slate roof. There are three storeys, a symmetrical front of seven bays, and a three-storey rear wing. Three steps lead up to a central Doric porch with two pairs of columns on plinths, a fluted frieze, a cornice and blocking course, and a doorway with a fanlight. The windows are sashes with moulded architraves and keystones. On each side of the house is a brick quadrant wall with stone coping, ramped up at the end to stone piers with domed caps. In the centre of each wall is a doorway with a rusticated architrave and a double keystone. From the right-hand pier runs a high coped stone wall.

Inside the house is an entrance hall with a dado rail, and early doors to the rooms on each side. There is a large staircase with an open well, lit by a Venetian window with Ionic columns. The right-hand front room has early decoration include its overmantel, panelling, dado rail and cornice.

== See also ==
- Grade II* listed buildings in North Yorkshire (district)
- Listed buildings in Crakehall
