= Hutton Hang =

Hamlet and civil parish in North Yorkshire, England

Coordinates: 54.29495°N 1.74031°W

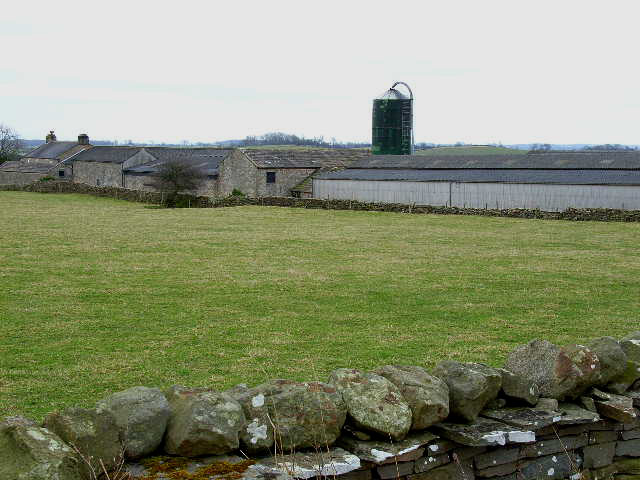
- Hutton Hang Farm

- Location within North Yorkshire
- Unitary authority: North Yorkshire
- Ceremonial county: North Yorkshire
- Region: Yorkshire and the Humber
- Country: England
- Sovereign state: United Kingdom
- Post town: Leyburn
- Postcode district: DL8
- Police: North Yorkshire
- Fire: North Yorkshire
- Ambulance: Yorkshire

Hutton Hang is a hamlet and civil parish in the county of North Yorkshire, England. The population taken at the 2011 census was less than 100. Information is included within the parish of Spennithorne. About 4 miles east of Leyburn. Nearby villages include Finghall, Akebar, Thornton Steward and Constable Burton.

From 1974 to 2023 it was part of the district of Richmondshire, it is now administered by the unitary North Yorkshire Council.
