= Listed buildings in East Hauxwell =

East Hauxwell is a civil parish in the county of North Yorkshire, England. It contains five listed buildings that are recorded in the National Heritage List for England. All the listed buildings are designated at Grade II, the lowest of the three grades, which is applied to "buildings of national importance and special interest". The parish contains the village of East Hauxwell and the surrounding countryside, and the listed buildings are all houses or farmhouses.

== Buildings ==
Name and location	Photograph	Date	Notes
East Ayrlow Banks; 54.33763°N 1.72636°W	—	Late 17th century	The farmhouse is rendered, and has a roof of Welsh slate at the front and stone slate at the rear, with stone copings and shaped kneelers. There are two storeys and four bays. The central doorway has a chamfered surround, some of the windows are casements, most are horizontally-sliding sashes, and all have wedge lintels.
Wood Cottage; 54.33941°N 1.74334°W	—	1739	A stone house with quoins, and a pantile roof with stone slates at the eaves, stone copings and shaped kneelers. There are two storeys, two bays and a rear wing. The central doorway has a chamfered and quoined surround, and an initialled and dated lintel. The windows are horizontally-sliding sashes with flat arches of stone voussoirs.
Village Farmhouse; 54.33913°N 1.74281°W	—	Mid 18th century	The farmhouse is in stone, with quoins, and a stone slate roof with stone copings and shaped kneelers. There are three storeys and three bays. In the centre is a porch and a doorway with a chamfered quoined surround. Some of the windows are blank, and the others are casements with deep lintels.
1 and 2 Pump Street; 54.34032°N 1.74277°W		1751	A house with a cottage to the left, in stone, with sandstone dressings, quoins and two storeys. The cottage has a tile roof, and the house has a pantile roof with stone slate at the eaves, and they have stone copings and shaped kneelers. The cottage has one bay, and contains a doorway with a chamfered surround and interrupted jambs, and two-light mullioned windows. The house has two bays and a partial rear outshut, and contains a doorway with a chamfered quoined surround and chamfer-stops to the plinths, and a dated and initialled lintel. There is one sash window and the other windows are mullioned.
Laurel Bank; 54.33930°N 1.74338°W	—	1760	Two cottages combined into a house, in stone, with a Welsh slate roof, stone copings and shaped kneelers. There are two storeys and four bays. The doorway has a chamfered sandstone surround, interrupted jambs, and an initialled and dated lintel. The windows are horizontally-sliding sashes.
