= Arrathorne =

Hamlet and civil parish in North Yorkshire, England

Coordinates: 54.3348°N 1.69218°W

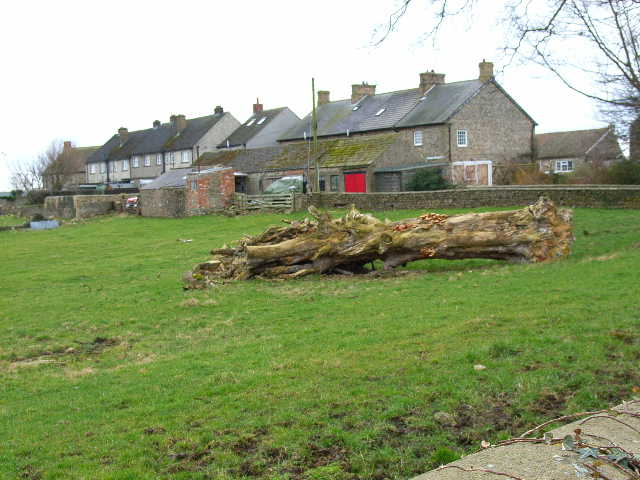
- Cottages at Arrathorne

- Location within North Yorkshire
- Population: about 90
- OS grid reference: SE201932
- Unitary authority: North Yorkshire
- Ceremonial county: North Yorkshire
- Region: Yorkshire and the Humber
- Country: England
- Sovereign state: United Kingdom
- Post town: BEDALE
- Postcode district: DL8
- Dialling code: 01677
- Police: North Yorkshire
- Fire: North Yorkshire
- Ambulance: Yorkshire

Arrathorne is a hamlet and civil parish in the county of North Yorkshire, England. The settlement is 6 miles (9 km) south of Richmond, 6 miles (9 km) north-west of Bedale and 6 miles (9 km) east of Leyburn. The name has been recorded variously as Ergthorn, Erchethorn, Erghethorn, Erethorn and Arrowthorne. The nearest city to Arrathorne is Ripon.

From 1974 to 2023 it was part of the district of Richmondshire. It is now administered by the unitary North Yorkshire Council.

== Name ==
Arrathorne means the shieling in a thorny thicket. This may have referred to broom, the namesake of neighbouring Patrick Brompton, the parish to which Arrathorne has belonged, in the wapentake of Hang East.

== Population ==
The population in 2011 census was 90 with an estimated population of the same number in 2015. According to the 2001 census it had a population of 61.

There is one recorded descriptive gazetteer entry, in John Bartholomew's Gazetteer of the British Isles: "Arrathorne, township, North-Riding Yorkshire, 5 miles NE. of Leyburn, 671 ac., pop. 62."

== Facilities ==
Arrathorne has neither a pub nor a public telephone box, and it is not on a bus route: the nearest bus stop is in Hunton, just over a mile away. The nearest national rail station on the East Coast Main Line is in Northallerton 11 miles (18 km) away.
