= Hauxwell Hall =

Grade II* listed house in North Yorkshire, England

Coordinates: 54.3353°N 1.7526°W

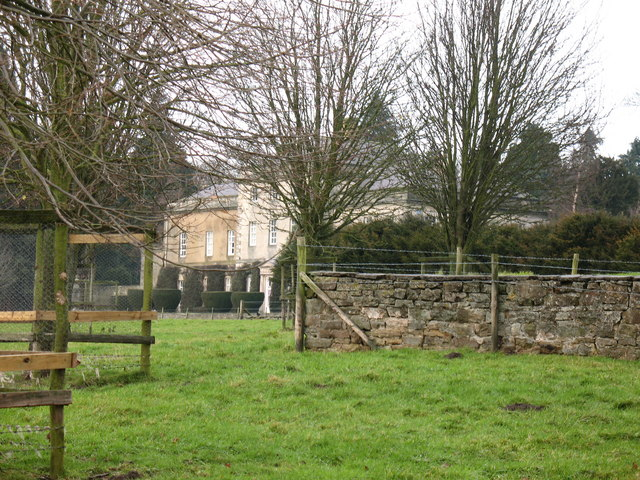
Hauxwell Hall

Hauxwell Hall or Hawkswell Hall is a grade II* listed 17th-century country house in West Hauxwell, North Yorkshire, England, some 5 miles (8 km) south-west of Catterick.

It is built of coursed sandstone, part rendered, and ashlar, with Welsh slate roofs. The main range is a 17th-century, 3-storey block with a 5-bay frontage, flanked by 18th century 2-storey wings.

== History ==
Sir William Dalton, third son of the Mayor of Hull and a member of the Council of the North, acquired the manors of East and West Haukswell in 1631. He died in 1649, leaving the estate to his grandson, William Dalton, whose father John Dalton, a lieutenant-colonel in the Royalist army, had been killed in action when escorting the queen in 1646. William was knighted at the Restoration of the Monarchy and renovated and enlarged the hall. He died in 1675, leaving the property to his eldest son, Marmaduke, who was knighted in 1665 and drowned in 1680. The property passed to his youngest daughter, Elizabeth, who never married.

After Elizabeth got into financial difficulties, possession passed in 1717 to Sir Marmaduke's younger brother, Sir Charles Dalton, the Gentleman Usher of the Black Rod, who added an additional wing to the building and died unmarried in 1747. The property was then held for the next forty years by his nephew, the Rev. Charles Dalton, after which it passed to his brother Francis. Francis' only daughter Frances married a Gale, and her granddaughter, married to a Wade, took the additional surname of Dalton on inheriting the estate. The estate was owned by three generations of Wade-Daltons, of whom William Lechmere Wade-Dalton was appointed High Sheriff of Yorkshire for 1935–36, before it passed to a distant kinsman, the diplomat Richard Dalton. He was a direct descendant of the original purchaser and moved in with his family in 1981.

== See also ==
- Grade II* listed buildings in North Yorkshire (district)
- Listed buildings in West Hauxwell
