= Garriston =

Hamlet in North Yorkshire, England

Coordinates: 54.32955°N 1.75938°W

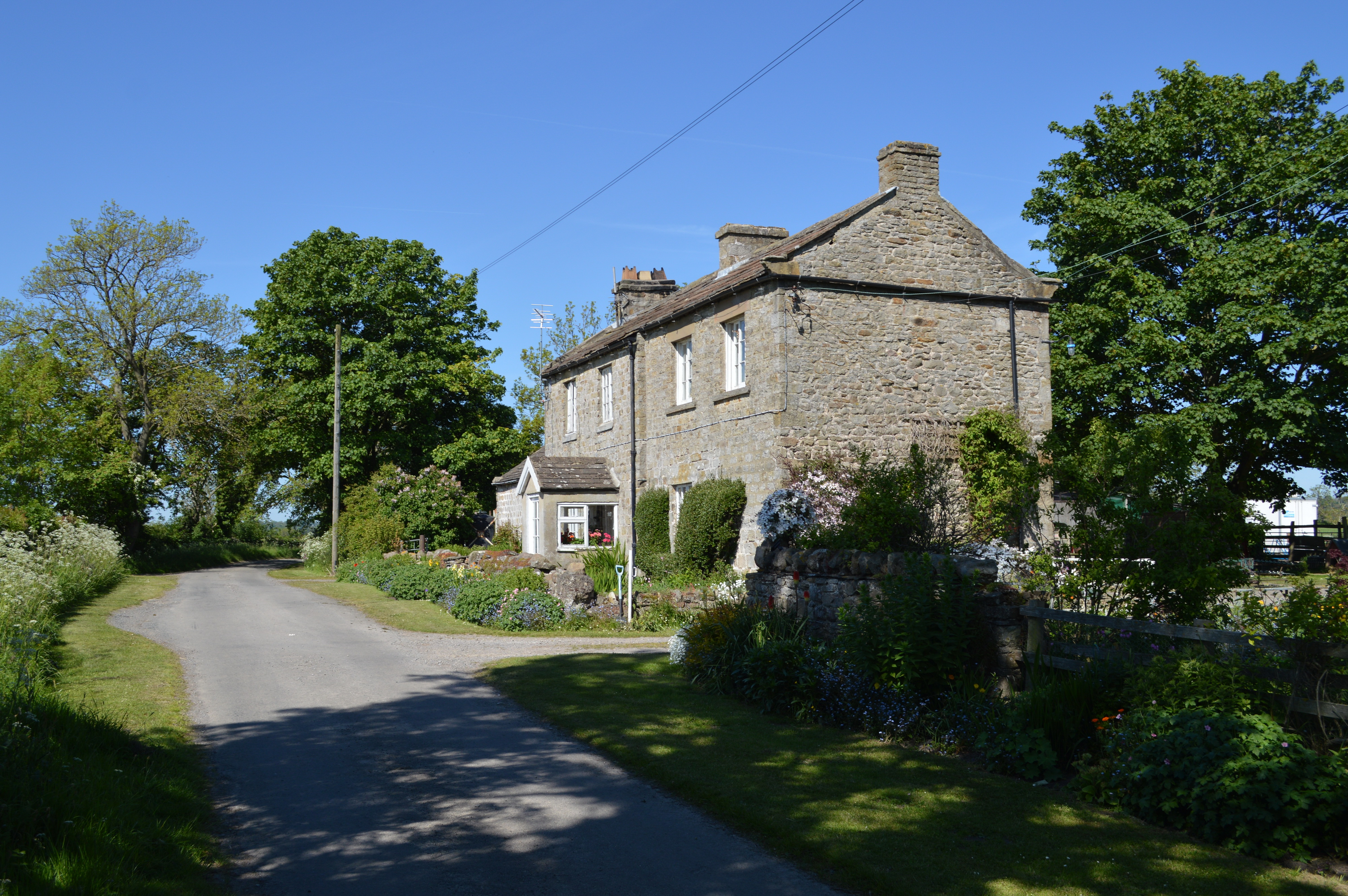
- Cottages

- Location within North Yorkshire
- Population: 20 (2015)
- OS grid reference: SE157926
- Civil parish: Garriston
- Unitary authority: North Yorkshire
- Ceremonial county: North Yorkshire
- Region: Yorkshire and the Humber
- Country: England
- Sovereign state: United Kingdom
- Post town: LEYBURN
- Postcode district: DL8
- Police: North Yorkshire
- Fire: North Yorkshire
- Ambulance: Yorkshire

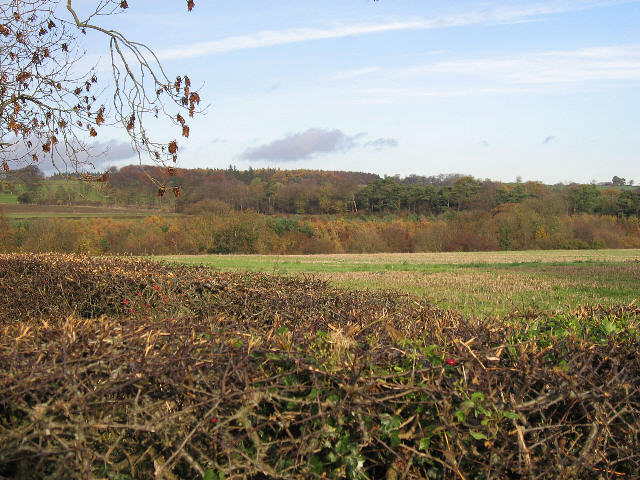
West Spring Wood, north of Garriston

Garriston is a hamlet and civil parish north-east of Leyburn in North Yorkshire, England. In 2015, North Yorkshire County Council estimated the population at 20. At the 2011 census the population remained less than 100. Details are included in the parish of West Hauxwell.

From 1974 to 2023 it was part of the district of Richmondshire. It is now administered by the unitary North Yorkshire Council.
