= Barden, Richmondshire =

Hamlet and civil parish in North Yorkshire, England

Coordinates: 54°20′18″N 1°46′38″W

Barden
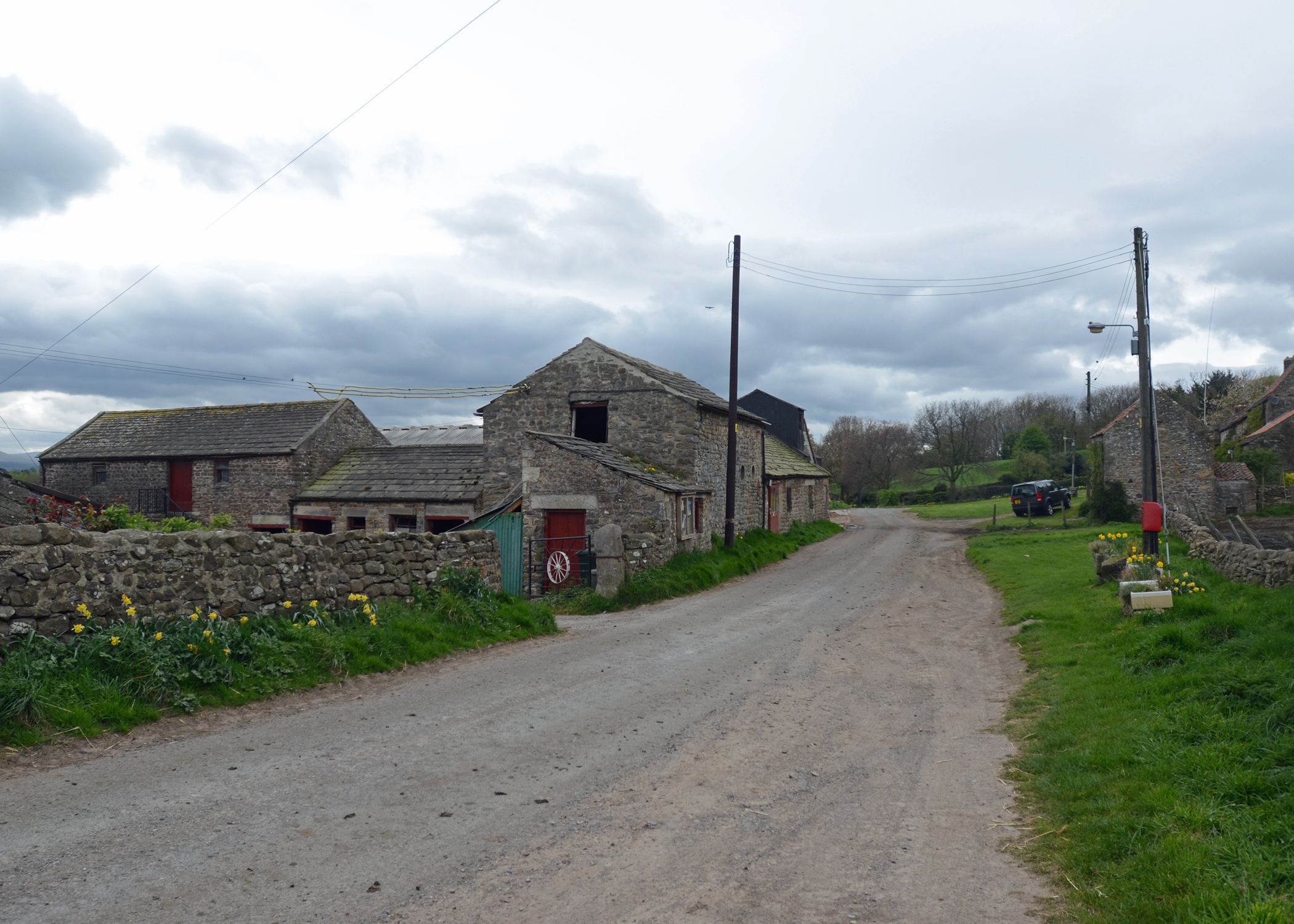
- The road through Barden hamlet

- Location within North Yorkshire
- OS grid reference: SE151937
- Civil parish: Barden
- Unitary authority: North Yorkshire
- Ceremonial county: North Yorkshire
- Region: Yorkshire and the Humber
- Country: England
- Sovereign state: United Kingdom
- Post town: Leyburn
- Postcode district: DL8
- Police: North Yorkshire
- Fire: North Yorkshire
- Ambulance: Yorkshire

Barden is a hamlet and civil parish in North Yorkshire, England. It is about 5 miles (8 km) south of Richmond. According to the 2001 census the parish had a population of 49, remaining at less than 100 in the 2011 Census. Population information is kept in the parish of Hauxwell.

From 1974 to 2023 it was part of the district of Richmondshire, it is now administered by the unitary North Yorkshire Council.

Barden Old Hall, in the hamlet, is a grade II* listed building dating from soon after 1400.

== See also ==
- Listed buildings in Barden, Richmondshire
