= Listed buildings in Akebar =

Akebar is a civil parish in the county of North Yorkshire, England. It contains three listed buildings that are recorded in the National Heritage List for England. All the listed buildings are designated at Grade II, the lowest of the three grades, which is applied to "buildings of national importance and special interest". The parish contains the settlement of Akebar and the surrounding countryside. The listed buildings consist of a road bridge, a memorial stone and a milepost.

== Buildings ==
Name and location	Photograph	Date	Notes
Leeming Beck Bridge; 54.30875°N 1.71331°W	—	Late 18th or early 19th century	The bridge carries Chapel Lane over Burton Beck. It is in sandstone, and consists of a single segmental arch with voussoirs. The bridge has a band, a parapet of smaller stones, with segmental stone coping, and stone cylindrical end bollards with moulded bases.
Nichol's Stone; 54.31129°N 1.70174°W		1826	A memorial stone on the north side of Conyers Lane (A684 road). It is in sandstone, and consists of a slab about 1 metre (3 ft 3 in) high and 300 millimetres (12 in) wide with a rounded top. The stone is inscribed "MAY 19, 1826 DO NO MURDER".
Mile post 54.31156°N 1.71570°W	—	Late 19th century	The mile post is on the north side of Conyers Lane (A684 road), and is in cast iron. It has a triangular plan and a sloping top. On the top is inscribed "LEYBURN H D", on the left side is a pointing hand and the distance to Bedale, and on the right side is a pointing hand and the distance to Leyburn.
