= Barden Old Hall =

Building in North Yorkshire, England

Coordinates: 54°20′13″N 1°46′54″W

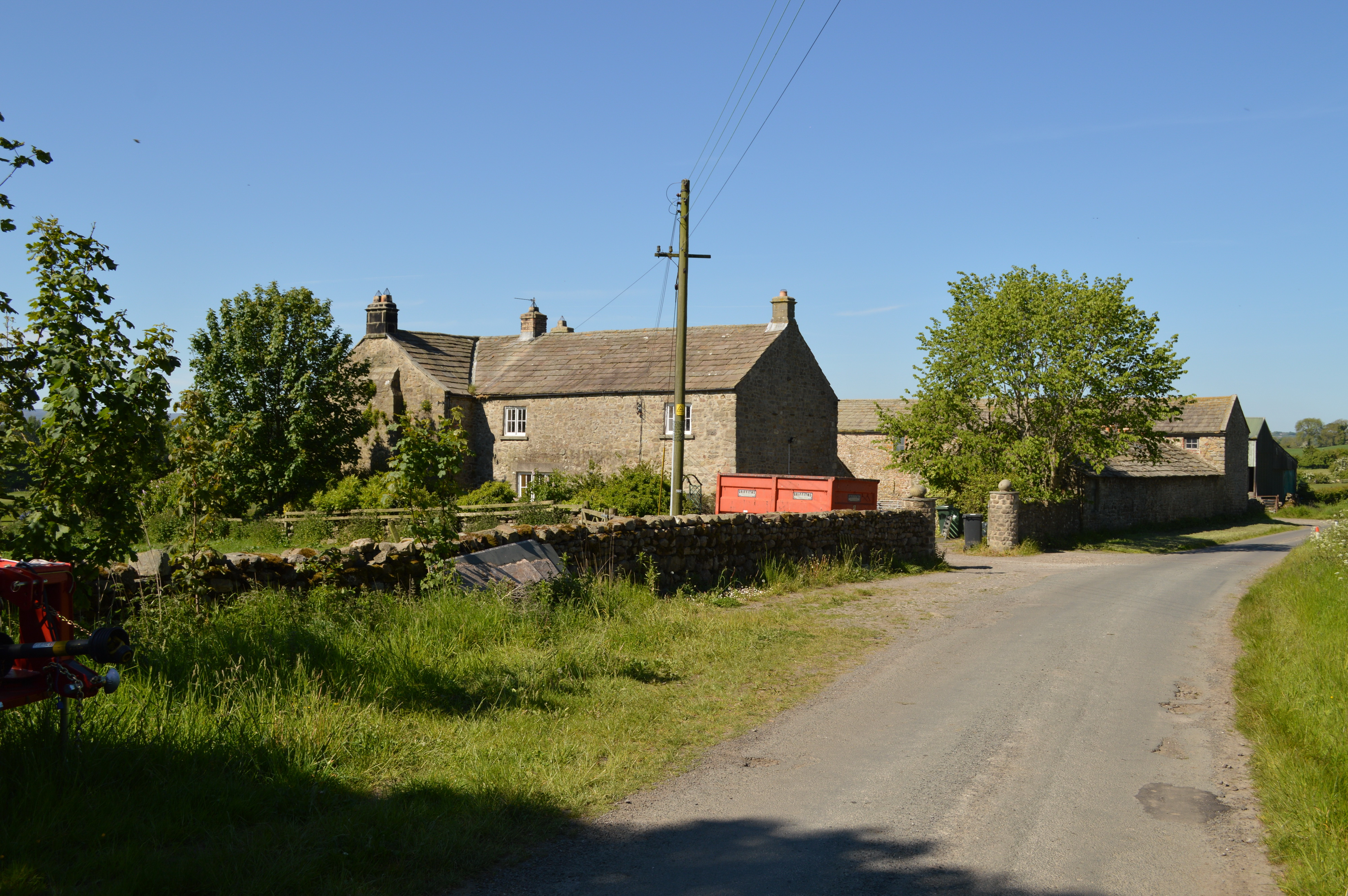
The building, in 2015

Barden Old Hall is a historic building in Barden, a hamlet near Richmond, North Yorkshire, in England.

The building probably dates from the early 15th century, when the Eglescliff family replaced an earlier house on the same site. It originally had an I-shaped plan, but the north wing was later demolished. It has been altered at various times from the 16th to the 20th century, and was Grade II* listed in 1967.

The two-storey house is built of rubble with ashlar quoins, and has a stone slate roof. It consists of a hall, now divided into smaller rooms; with a surviving cross-wing to the south, which originally contained the great chamber. The south front has two bays, and a central doorway with an initialled lintel, dated 1831. To its right is a four-light double-chamfered window with a hood mould, to the left is a two-light casement window set into a blocked doorway, and the upper floor contains casement windows. In the hall range are two blocked doorways which originally led to the screens passage, one with a four-centred arch and a hollow chamfered arris. Inside, two original fireplaces are believed to survive but are not visible, while several moulded beams can be seen.

== See also ==
- Listed buildings in Barden, Richmondshire
