= Crakehall Mill =

Historic watermill in Crakehall, North Yorkshire, England

Coordinates: 54°18′24″N 1°37′41″W

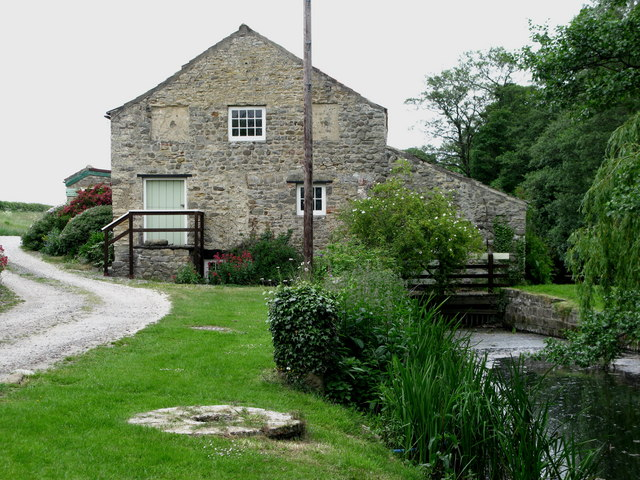
The mill, in 2009

Crakehall Mill is a historic watermill in Crakehall, a village in North Yorkshire, in England.

Two watermills were recorded in Crakehall in 1297, and one was sited on Crakehall Beck, on the site of the current mill. The building is dated by Historic England to the early 19th century, but by the Society for the Protection of Ancient Buildings to the 17th century. The mill ceased working in 1930, but the machinery remained in situ. It was restored, and began working again in 1977, and although it closed in 2002, it reopened again in 2010, following extensive repairs. It typically produces 2.5 to 3 tonnes of flour per year. The building was Grade II listed in 1988.

The building is constructed of stone with a pantile roof. It hasbr two storeys, three bays, and an outshut to the right containing the 18 feet (5.5 m) breastshot waterwheel. Steps lead up to a stable door in the left bay, and the windows are casements. Inside are two pairs of millstones and assorted machinery.

== See also ==
- Listed buildings in Crakehall
