= St Gregory's Church, Crakehall =

Anglican church in North Yorkshire, England

Coordinates: 54°18′17″N 1°37′32″W

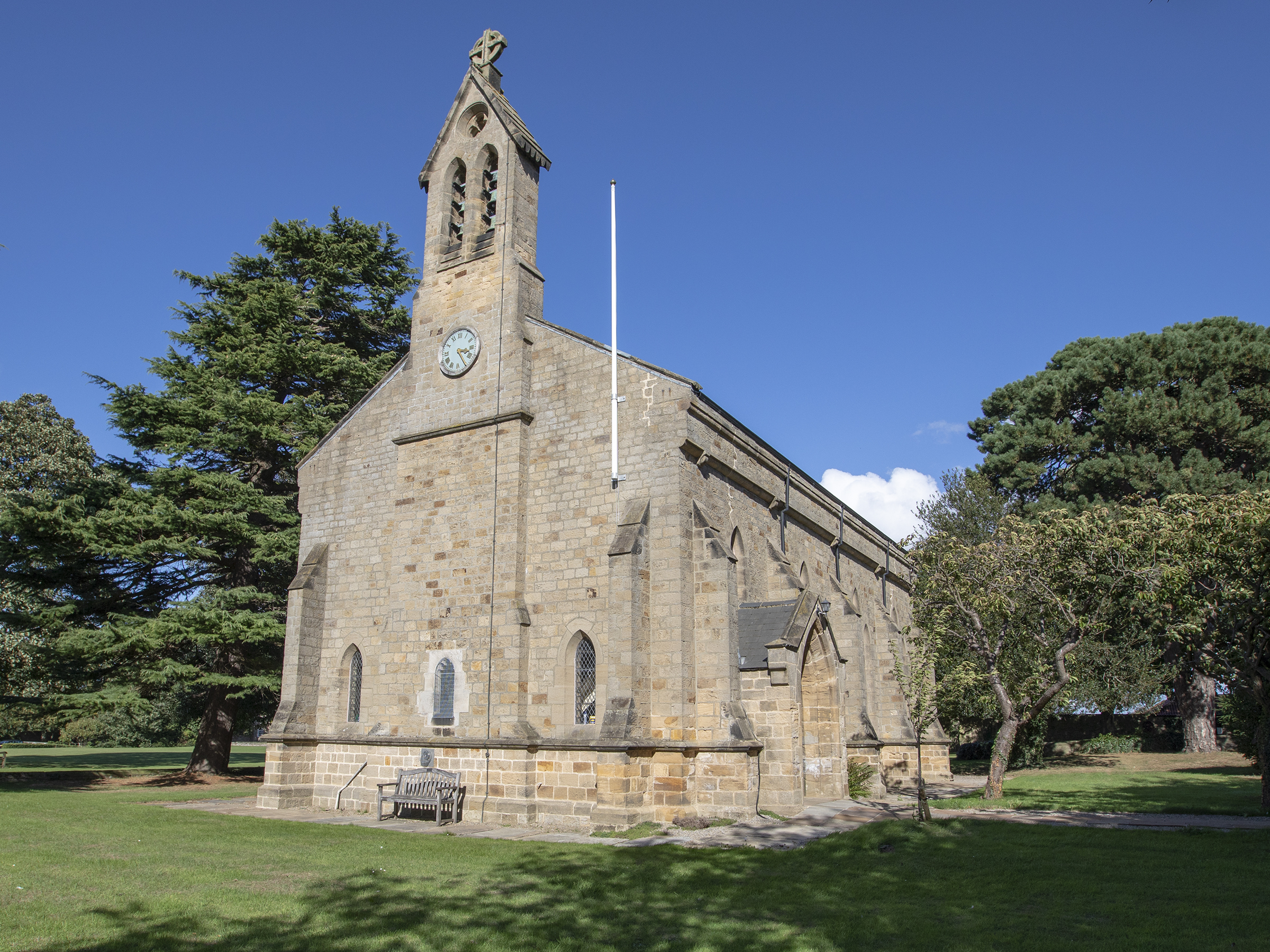
The church, in 2018

St Gregory's Church is the parish church of Crakehall, a village in North Yorkshire, in England.

Until the mid 19th century, Crakehall was part of the parish of St Gregory's Church, Bedale. In 1840, a church was constructed in Great Crakehall, to a Gothic Revival design by John Harper. By 1868, the church was described as "in many respects, one of the most mean and squalid churches in the diocese". That year, George Fowler Jones reworked the interior, introducing new tiling and a new communion rail, prayer desk, pulpit, lectern and choir seats. The church was Grade II listed in 1988.

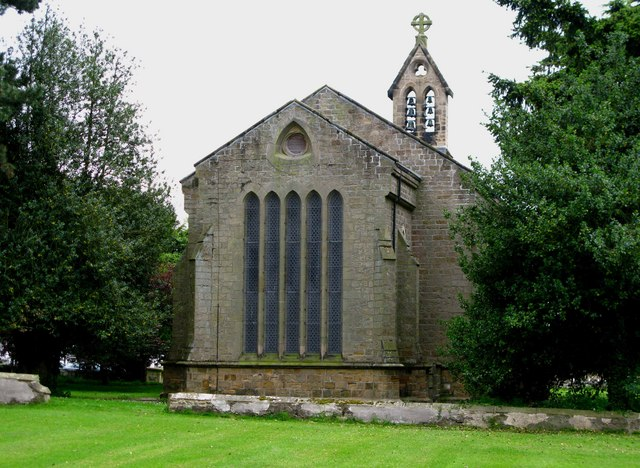
East end of the church

The church is built of stone, with a Welsh slate roof. It consists of a four-bay nave, a south porch and a single-bay chancel. On the west gable is a bellcote that has two pointed arches with pointed heads each containing three bells, above which is a pierced trefoil and a cross. Under the bellcote is a clock. The windows are lancets, stepped along the sides, and at the east end are five lancets and a triangular blocked window above.

== See also ==
- Listed buildings in Crakehall
