= St Oswald's Church, Hauxwell =

Church in West Hauxwell, North Yorkshire, England

Coordinates: 54.3331°N 1.7468°W

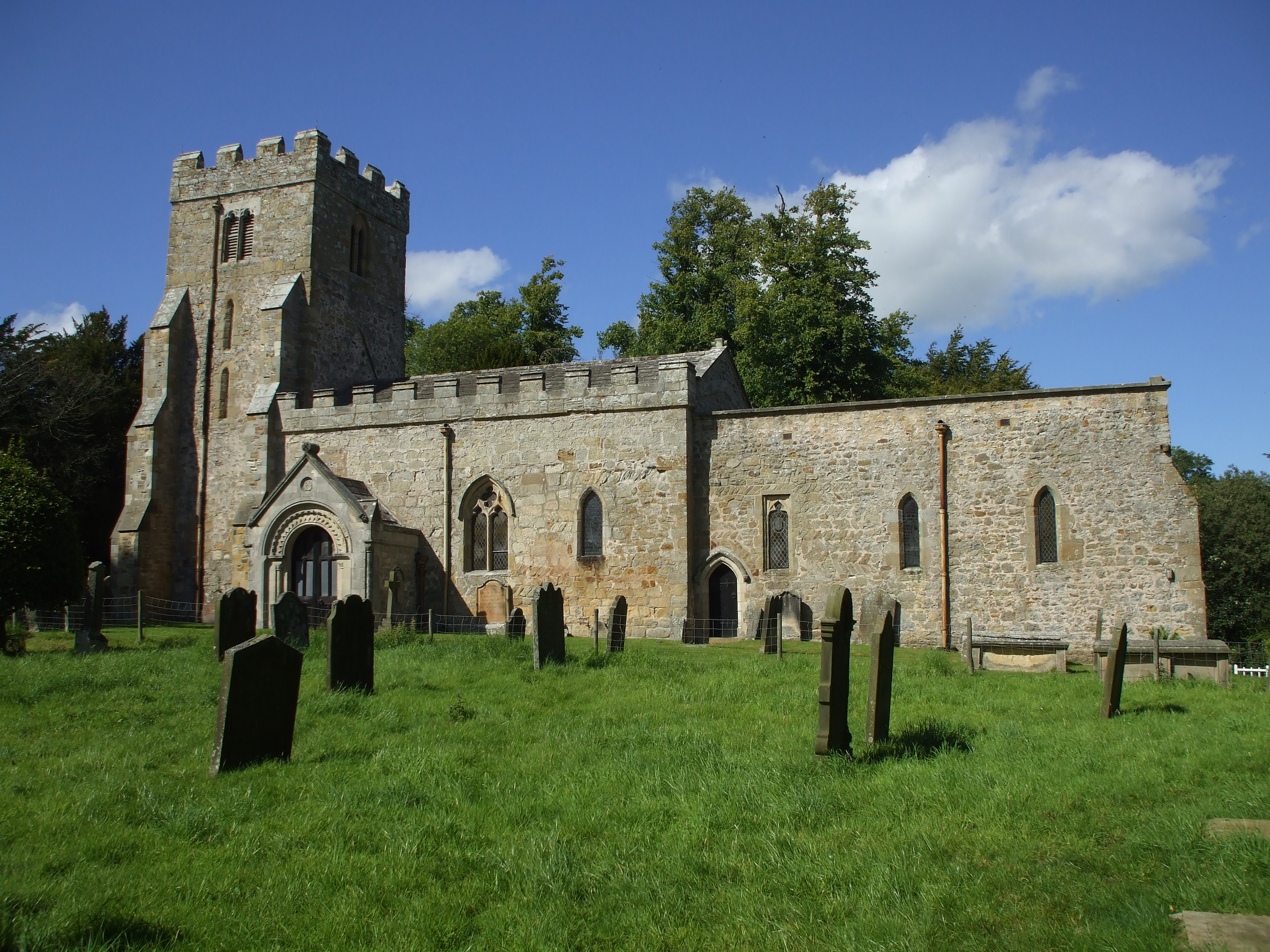
The church, in 2010

St Oswald's Church is the parish church of West Hauxwell, a village in North Yorkshire, in England.

The church was built in the 11th century. In about 1230, the chancel was doubled in length, and a tower was added. The church was restored in 1861 by George Fowler Jones, who added a porch and a vestry. The church was grade I listed in 1967. In 2025, it was added to the Heritage at Risk Register, at which time it was described as in "very bad" and "declining" condition.

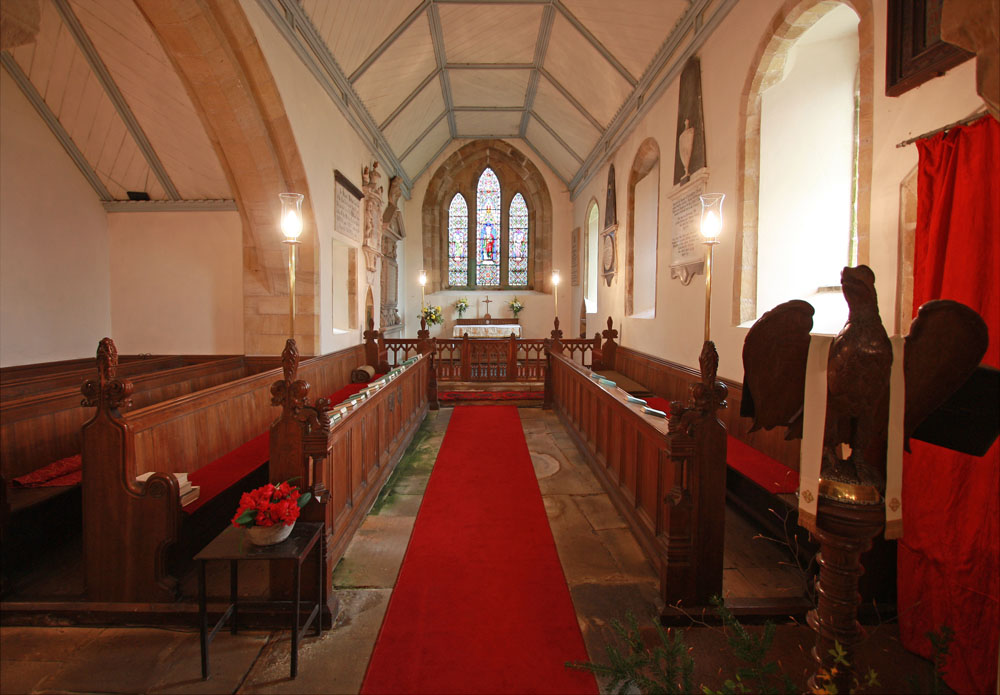
East end of the church

The church is built of sandstone with roofs of stone slate and lead, and consists of a nave with a south porch, a chancel with a north vestry, and a west tower. The tower has four stages, angle buttresses, a two-light west window, lancet windows, two-light bell openings, and an embattled parapet. The nave and the vestry also have embattled parapets. The gabled porch has a round-arched entrance and inside is a Norman doorway that has columns with scallop capitals, zigzag, billet and roll mouldings. Inside, there is a piscina, an octagonal font on a 13th-century base, a pulpit built from Jacobean panels, two 15th-century bench ends, and memorials including effigies of William de Barden, who died in 1309, and his wife.

In the churchyard to the south of the church is a cross shaft, dating from the 8th or 9th century. It is carved from stone and about 2 metres (6 ft 7 in) in height. The shaft is set on a plain base, and on the east side is a Stafford knot pattern and a panel for an inscription. Only part of the lower arm of the cross-head survives. It is a grade II listed building and also a scheduled monument. It is locally believed to commemorate James the Deacon, who is said to have founded the church.

== See also ==
- Grade I listed buildings in North Yorkshire (district)
- Listed buildings in West Hauxwell
