= Listed buildings in Finghall =

Finghall is a civil parish in the county of North Yorkshire, England. It contains eleven listed buildings that are recorded in the National Heritage List for England. Of these, one is listed at Grade II*, the middle of the three grades, and the others are at Grade II, the lowest grade. The parish contains the village of Finghall and the surrounding area. Most of the listed buildings are houses and associated structures in the village, and the others consist of a public house, and a church with items in the churchyard.

== Key ==
| Grade | Criteria |
|---|---|
| II* | Particularly important buildings of more than special interest |
| II | Buildings of national importance and special interest |

== Buildings ==
| Name and location | Photograph | Date | Notes | Grade |
|---|---|---|---|---|
| St Andrew's Church; 54.30674°N 1.70854°W | | Mid 12th century | The church, which has been altered through the centuries, is in sandstone with a stone slate roof. It consists of a west porch, a nave, a north aisle, and a chancel with a north vestry and heating chamber. On the east gable of the nave is a double bellcote. Inside the porch is a stone bench, and steps leading up to the former gallery doorway. | II* |
| Medieval grave cover 54.30661°N 1.70844°W | — | 14th century | The grave cover in the churchyard of St Andrew's Church is in sandstone. On it is a foliate cross with branches, and a small book and small shears. | II |
| Manor House; 54.30243°N 1.72411°W | — | Late 17th to early 18th century | A rectory, later a private house, it is roughcast, and has an artificial stone slate roof with stone coping. There are two storeys and a front of five bays. In the centre is a two-storey porch and a doorway with a divided fanlight, and the windows are sashes. At the rear are seven bays, canted bay windows, and an attic window with Gothic glazing. | II |
| Queen's Head; 54.30282°N 1.72245°W | | Late 17th to early 18th century | The public house is in stone with a stone slate roof. There are two storeys, three bays, the right bay lower, and a rear outshut. On the front is a gabled porch, a canted bay window in the right bay, and the other windows are sashes. | II |
| Chest tomb of Matthew Edwards; 54.30666°N 1.70876°W | — | c. 1735 | The chest tomb in the churchyard of St Andrew's Church is in sandstone. On the lid is an inscription, and on the ends and sides are sunflowers flanked by console pilasters. | II |
| The Firkers; 54.30285°N 1.72278°W | — | Early to mid 18th century | A house, with an attached byre later incorporated, in stone with two storeys. The house has a pantile roof, two bays, a gabled porch with a round-arched entrance, and horizontally-sliding sash windows. The former byre to the right is lower, and has a Welsh slate roof with stone coping on the right, quoins, one bay, and a casement window. | II |
| Newton Cottage; 54.30287°N 1.72357°W | — | Mid to late 18th century | A stone house with quoins, and a stone slate roof with shaped kneelers and stone coping. There are two storeys and two bays. The doorway is in the centre, the windows are sashes, and all the openings have deep lintels. | II |
| Naitby Memorial; 54.30669°N 1.70880°W | — | c. 1779 | The memorial in the churchyard of St Andrew's Church is in sandstone. It consists of an upright slab with an inscription and a carving of crossed palm fronds in the tympanum. | II |
| Cricket Cottage; 54.30285°N 1.72310°W | — | Late 18th to early 19th century | The house is in sandstone, with quoins, and a stone slate roof with shaped kneelers and stone coping. There are two storeys and two bays. In the centre is a doorway, the windows are sashes, and all the openings have deep lintels with herringbone tooling. | II |
| Park Cottage; 54.30247°N 1.72241°W | — | Late 18th to early 19th century | A house and workshop in sandstone, with a stone slate roof, shaped kneelers and stone coping. There are two storeys, two bays, a single-storey workshop on the left, and a rear outshut. The central doorway and the windows on the house, which are sashes, all have deep lintels, and in the workshop are fixed-light windows. | II |
| Gate piers, Manor House; 54.30271°N 1.72412°W | — | Early 19th century | The gate piers flanking the entrance to the grounds are in sandstone. They are rusticated, and have a square plan, and simple bases and caps. | II |
