= Thomas Milville Raven =

English vicar and photographer (1828–1896)

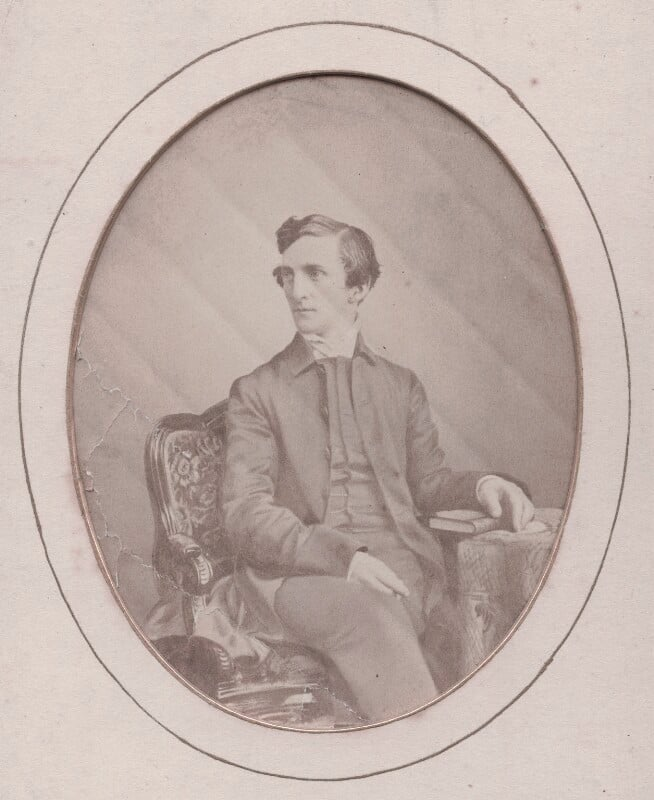
Raven in the 1860s

The Reverend Thomas Milville Raven FRSE (1828–1896) was an English vicar remembered as a theological author and early calotype photographer. Some documents name him as Thomas Melville Raven.

== Life ==
He studied divinity at St David's College in Lampeter (now known as the University of Wales), graduating MA.

From 1856, he was experimenting with calotype photography and exhibiting photographs of the Pyrenees, Pau and towns in France. In 1858, he was living in Edinburgh and joined the Scottish Photographic Society, the more formal rival to the Edinburgh Photographic Society. He was also a member of the Glasgow Photographic Society.

He lived at Waldringfield Rectory in Suffolk and is presumed vicar of that parish. In 1863, he moved to Scruton in Yorkshire. In 1867, he became vicar of the nearby village of Crakehall also having pastoral duties in Langthorne.

In 1864, he was elected a member of the London Photographic Society.

In 1869, he was elected a fellow of the Royal Society of Edinburgh his proposer being Andrew Coventry.

He died on 13 June 1896.

== Family ==
He was married to Eliza. His wife is thought to be the elusive E. Raven referenced in some photographs as their creator.

They had one daughter who is thought to have died during their trip to Pau in 1857.

== Publications ==
- Account of a Photographic Tour from Jersey to the Pyrenees (1857)

== Photographic Works ==
see

- Mountain Stream near Cauteret (1857)
- Old House in the Market Place, Dinan (1857)
- Old Trees near Pau (1857)
- Path Through the Wood, Bolton Abbey (1856)
- Pierrefitte, Haute Pyrenees (1857)
- Porch of the Church at Wolags near Pau (1857)
- Avalanche near Cauteret, Haute Pyrenees (1857) - probably the first photograph of an avalanche
- View in Jersey (1857)
- View near Bagneres de Bigorre (1857)
- View near Lourdes (1857)
- View near Luz (1857)
- View near Pierrefitte (1857)
- View on the River Rance (1857)
