= The Green Tree =

Pub in Patrick Brompton, North Yorkshire, England

The pub, in 2017

The Green Tree is a historic pub in Patrick Brompton, a village in North Yorkshire, in England.

The building was constructed as a house in the mid 18th century, and is said to have at one time served as the vicarage. It was grade II listed in 1987. The pub closed in 2019 but was registered as an asset of community value. It was refurbished at a cost of £600,000, the work including demolishing a rear extension and constructing a new one, to house a kitchen, and reopened in 2023.

The pub is built of roughcast stone, and has a pantile roof with stone slates at the eaves and stone copings. There are two storeys and five bays. The central doorway has a three-pane fanlight, and the windows are horizontally-sliding sashes.

== See also ==
- Listed buildings in Patrick Brompton
