= Finghall =

Village and civil parish in North Yorkshire, England

Coordinates: 54.30148°N 1.72205°W

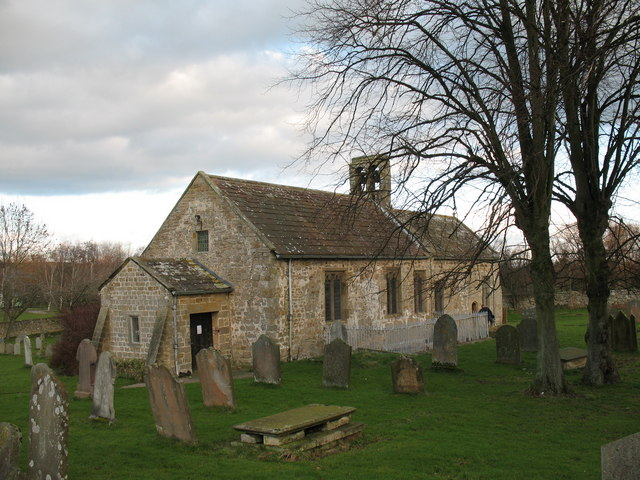
- St Andrews Church, Finghall

- Location within North Yorkshire
- Population: 140
- OS grid reference: SE181895
- Unitary authority: North Yorkshire
- Ceremonial county: North Yorkshire
- Region: Yorkshire and the Humber
- Country: England
- Sovereign state: United Kingdom
- Post town: Leyburn
- Postcode district: DL8
- Police: North Yorkshire
- Fire: North Yorkshire
- Ambulance: Yorkshire
- UK Parliament: Richmond and Northallerton

Finghall, historically spelt Fingall, is a village and civil parish in North Yorkshire, England. It is in lower Wensleydale south of the A684 road, about 6.2 miles (10 km) west of Bedale and about 5 miles (8 km) east of Leyburn.

The population of the parish was estimated at 140 in 2016.

== History ==
The village is mentioned in Domesday Book as Fingall, when it belonged to Count Alan and had 13 villagers. The origin of the place-name is the Old English words Fin, inga and hall meaning a nook of land of the family or followers of a man called Fina. The place-name appears as Finegala in Domesday Book of 1086 and as Finyngale in 1157.

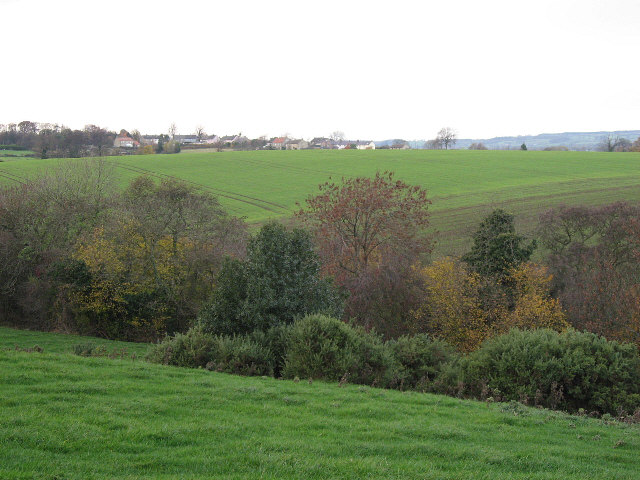
Looking towards Finghall from the south-east

Finghall was a large ancient parish in the wapentake of Hang West in the North Riding of Yorkshire. The parish included the townships of Finghall, Constable Burton, Akebar and Hutton Hang, all of which became separate civil parishes in 1866. From 1974 to 2023 it was part of the district of Richmondshire, it is now administered by the unitary North Yorkshire Council.

In the 1820s Finghall had a population of 126, which had dropped to 111 by 1872 and 99 by 1897. The 12th-century church is dedicated to St Andrew and is adjacent to the beck and quite near the A684 road. It is thought that the Medieval village of Fingall was clustered around the church but was abandoned during a plague.

The village had a railway station on the Wensleydale Railway, which opened in the 1850s and closed in 1954. It was reopened on the heritage Wensleydale Railway in 2004. The village has an annual Spring Bank Holiday Barrel Push, which sees competitors push an 18-imperial-gallon (82 L; 22 US gal) metal beer barrel over a distance of 3,300 feet (1,000 m).

== Culture and community ==
The village public house is the Queen's Head. A local legend maintains that the willows that line the beck to the north of the village, of which there is a good view from the dining room and terrace of the pub, inspired Kenneth Grahame to write The Wind in the Willows. The village to the east is Newton-le-Willows.

== Famous residents ==
- Edward Banks (4 January 1770 – 5 July 1835), noted builder (Waterloo Bridge and London Bridge)
- Russ Swift (born 1951), British precision driver.

== See also ==
- Listed buildings in Finghall
