= Listed buildings in West Hauxwell =

West Hauxwell is a civil parish in the county of North Yorkshire, England. It contains 13 listed buildings that are recorded in the National Heritage List for England. Of these, one is listed at Grade I, the highest of the three grades, one is at Grade II*, the middle grade, and the others are at Grade II, the lowest grade. The parish does not contain a settlement of any substantial size. The most important buildings are a church, which is listed together with items in the churchyard, and a country house, which is listed together with associated structures in its grounds. The other listed buildings are a memorial obelisk, and a former watermill.

== Key ==
Grade	Criteria
I	Buildings of exceptional interest, sometimes considered to be internationally important
II*	Particularly important buildings of more than special interest
II	Buildings of national importance and special interest

== Buildings ==
Name and location	Photograph	Date	Notes	Grade
Cross shaft, St Oswald's Church; 54.33297°N 1.74685°W	—	8th or 9th century	The cross shaft is in the churchyard to the south of the church. It is in stone and about 2 metres (6 ft 7 in) in height. The shaft is set on a plain base, and on the east side is a knot pattern and a panel for an inscription.	II
St Oswald's Church; 54.33311°N 1.74684°W		Late 11th century	The church has been altered and extended through the centuries, including a restoration in 1861 by George Fowler Jones. It is built in sandstone with roofs of stone slate and lead, and consists of a nave with a south porch, a chancel with a north vestry, and a west tower. The tower has four stages, angle buttresses, a two-light west window, lancet windows, two-light bell openings, and an embattled parapet. The nave and the vestry also have embattled parapets. The gabled porch has a round-arched entrance and inside is a Norman doorway that has columns with scallop capitals, zigzag, billet and roll mouldings.	I
Ten tombstones and a column base, St Oswald's Church; 54.33309°N 1.74712°W	—	13th to 14th century	The tombstones are in the churchyard to the west of the church. They are in stone, and consist of grave covers laid flat. Five of them have a tapering plan, and are triangular in section, with a raised ribbed cross, incised swords and shields. The other five have a chamfered trapezoid plan. Nearby is the base of a shafted column.	II
Two tombstones flanking the priest's door of St Oswald's Church; 54.33308°N 1.74673°W	—	Late medieval	These are two small rectangular stones against the south wall of the chancel on each side of the priest's door. The left tombstone has a stepped base, and both have a cross and initials.	II
Archway northeast of Hauxwell Hall; 54.33548°N 1.75238°W	—	c. 1660–70	The archway is in stone, and has a moulded semicircular arch on moulded imposts, flanked by fluted Ionic pilasters. There is an entablature with a frieze of ogee section, above which is a cornice and a moulded blocking course, over which is a coat of arms flanked by caryatids, a mask and two ball finials.	II
Hauxwell Hall; 54.33535°N 1.75269°W		Late 17th century	A country house in sandstone, partly rendered, on a plinth, with hipped Welsh slate roofs. The main block has three storeys, and is flanked by two-storey ranges with a further range to the west. The main block has three bays, a plinth and a parapet. The central doorway has a chamfered quoined surround, a fanlight and a cornice with two ball finials. The windows throughout are sashes. The garden front has nine bays, the middle three bays projecting, with chamfered rusticated quoins. In the centre is a doorway with a Tuscan surround, a fanlight and a pediment. Above is a floor band, a cornice and a parapet.	II*
Obelisk; 54.33338°N 1.75301°W	—	1717	The obelisk is in stone, about 8 metres (26 ft) in height, and has a square plan and entasis. It stands on a base with a dado, and has a cornice and a pyramidal top with a weathervane. On the east face is an inscription.	II
Tomb south of the tower of St Oswald's Church; 54.33300°N 1.74708°W	—	Mid-18th century	The tomb is in stone and consists of a slab on a low chest, with consoles projecting from the longer sides. On the south side, winged angels support a plaque with a weathered inscription.	II
Bell tower southwest of Hauxwell Hall; 54.33528°N 1.75309°W	—	Late 18th century (probable)	A folly in stone on a base of four circular steps. It is circular with two stages, columns with a square section, and a moulded band between the stages. On the top is a cornice, and a stone cupola with a pineapple finial.	II
Hauxwell Mill; 54.33152°N 1.74492°W	—	Late 18th century	A watermill and cottage, later a house and outbuildings, in stone, with quoins, and a stone slate roof with shaped kneelers and stone copings. There are two storeys and two bays. On the front is a central doorway and a doorway converted into a window, and further windows. To the right is a range of single-storey outbuildings with a roof of pantile and stone slate, containing board doors.	II
Gate piers, gates and railings east of St Oswald's Church; 54.33302°N 1.74519°W		Early 19th century	The gate piers flanking the entrance to the main drive of Hauxwell Hall are in stone with a square plan and chamfered rustication. Each pier has a plain base and a cornice, and is surmounted by a carved griffin. The gates and railings are in wrought iron. The gates have spear finials, and each gate has a roundel with a lion rampant. The side walls have a segmental plan and stone coping, and plain railings. At the ends are piers with pyramidal caps.	II
Stable block, Hauxwell Hall; 54.33563°N 1.75317°W	—	1848	A stable and coach house, later used for other purposes, in stone with quoins, a parapet, and a Welsh slate roof with coped gables and ball finials. There are two storeys and eight bays. In the centre is a carriageway with a chamfered segmental arch, a quoined surround, an impost and a keystone, above which is a band, and a pediment with a coat of arms. Elsewhere, there are mullioned or mullioned and transomed windows.	II
Range north of Hauxwell Hall; 54.33590°N 1.75283°W		1858	The range contains a gatehouse, offices and game larders, and has since been used for other purposes. It is in stone with quoins, and has a Welsh slate roof with stone copings and ball finials. There are seven bays, the middle bay projecting, with two storeys, containing a segmental arch with a chamfered surround, moulded imposts and a keystone. Above it is a coat of arms with a moulded surround, flanked by strapwork scrolls, and on each side is an oculus with a moulded surround. The outer bays have a single storey and contain cross windows, a coat of arms, initials and the date.	II
