= Richard Dalton (diplomat) =

British diplomat (born 1948)

Sir Richard Dalton
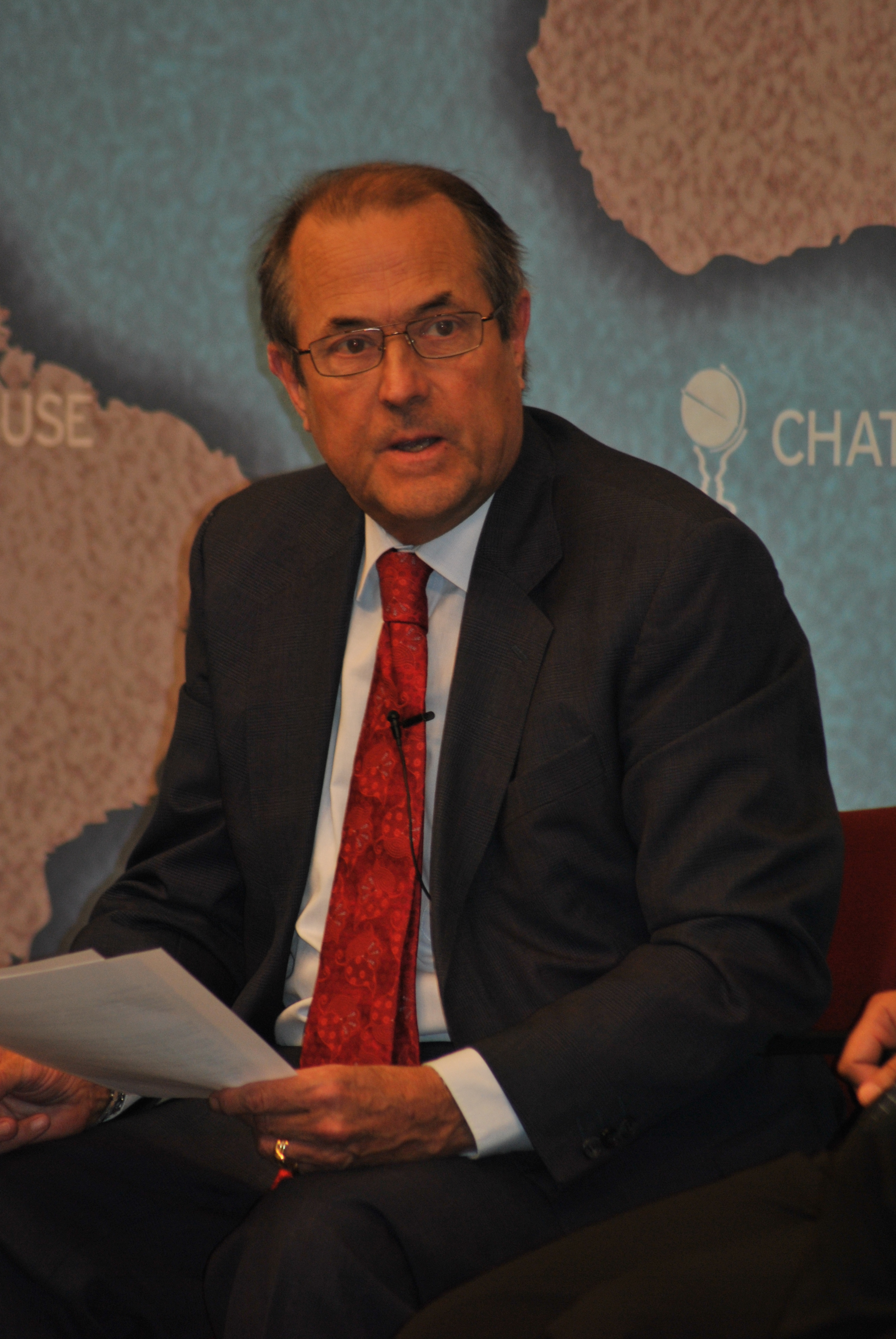
- Dalton at Chatham House in 2011

Personal details
- Born: Richard John Dalton; 10 October 1948 (age 77)
- Spouse: Elizabeth Mary Keays (m. 1972)
- Children: 4
- Occupation: Diplomat

Sir Richard John Dalton KCMG (born 10 October 1948) is a former senior member of the British Diplomatic Service. His assignments included British Ambassador to Libya and Iran. He retired from the Diplomatic Service in 2006. He is currently an Associate Fellow at Chatham House's Middle East and North Africa Programme. He was knighted KCMG in the 2005 Queen's Birthday Honours.

== Diplomatic career ==
Richard Dalton was educated at Winchester College and Magdalene College, Cambridge. He joined HM Diplomatic Service in 1970, went to study Arabic at MECAS in Lebanon and was posted as Second Secretary to Amman in 1973. His next posting was as Second Secretary, later First Secretary, to UKMIS New York in 1975, and he returned to the FCO four years later. In 1983, Dalton gave notice to the Personnel Department that he intended to stand as Conservative candidate for the Richmond, North Yorkshire constituency in the 1983 general election. However, he withdrew his candidacy for the seat before the story broke of his sister-in-law Sara Keays' affair with Trade and Industry Secretary Cecil Parkinson, and was posted as Head of Chancery to Muscat, Oman, in 1983.

In her 1985 book A Question of Judgement, Sara Keays wrote "You've got to bear in mind that my brother-in-law Richard is a diplomat". From 1993 to 1997, Dalton was Consul-General in Jerusalem effectively becoming Ambassador to the Palestinian Authority during the early years of the Middle East peace process. He was appointed Head of Personnel in the Foreign and Commonwealth Office (FCO) in 1998, and was sent as Britain's Ambassador to Libya in 1999, when diplomatic relations were resumed after a 17-year break. Between 2003 and 2006, Dalton was ambassador to Iran.

== Retirement ==
Following his retirement from the FCO in 2006, Sir Richard Dalton became an associate fellow on the Middle East and North African programme at the international affairs organisation, Chatham House where he heads the Libya Working Group, set up in February 2011. He has written extensively on the Middle East:

- 'Iran: Looking for a Thaw', The World Today, November 2008
- 'Britain Found a Ladder for Iran to Climb Down', The Daily Telegraph, April 2007
- 'Why Iran Must Make the Next Move', The Daily Telegraph, February 2007
- 'Regional Diplomacy in the Middle East: Iran is on a Roll', The World Today, January 2007

On 2 May 2007, Dalton appeared before the Foreign Affairs Select Committee and lectured at the Iran Society in February 2008.

In May 2009, Sir Richard Dalton commented on the request for the repatriation of the Libyan Abdelbaset al-Megrahi, who was convicted of carrying out the December 1988 Lockerbie bombing and who was in a Scottish jail suffering from terminal cancer: "A decision by the Scottish authorities to keep Megrahi would not seriously derail Britain's relations with Libya, but there would be consequences. Among them is the possibility that a successful appeal by Megrahi would plunge Britain, the United States and Libya once again into the fraught environment of an international investigation to find new Lockerbie suspects", Sir Richard said.

== Family ==
Richard John Dalton married Elizabeth Mary Keays on 1 January 1972. Following the death of his father, Major-General John Dalton, in 1981, he moved with his wife and four children—two sons (1978 and 1982) and two daughters (1973 and 1979)—into the Dalton family home at Hauxwell Hall in lower Wensleydale.
