= Crakehall =

Village and civil parish in North Yorkshire, England

Coordinates: 54°18′20″N 1°37′44″W

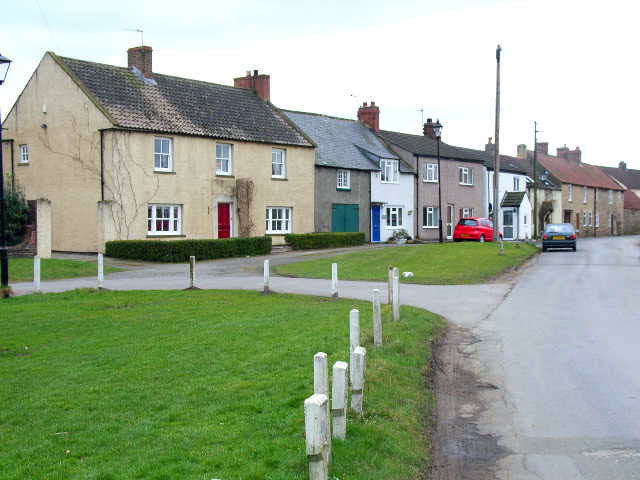
- The east end of the village, known as Great Crakehall.

- Location within North Yorkshire
- Population: 630
- OS grid reference: SE243899
  - London: 203 mi (327 km) SSE
- Unitary authority: North Yorkshire
- Ceremonial county: North Yorkshire
- Region: Yorkshire and the Humber
- Country: England
- Sovereign state: United Kingdom
- Post town: BEDALE
- Postcode district: DL8
- Dialling code: 01677
- Police: North Yorkshire
- Fire: North Yorkshire
- Ambulance: Yorkshire
- UK Parliament: Thirsk and Malton

Crakehall is a village and civil parish in the county of North Yorkshire, England, approximately 2 miles (3 km) west of Bedale. The village lies along the route of the A684 and is split into two parts by Bedale Beck, a tributary of the River Swale. The population was estimated at 630 in 2015. The north-west part is known as Little Crakehall, and the south-east part as Great Crakehall. It is 8.3 miles (13.4 km) west-south-west of the county town of Northallerton.

The parish also includes the hamlet of Kirkbridge, a mile east of Great Crakehall.

== History ==
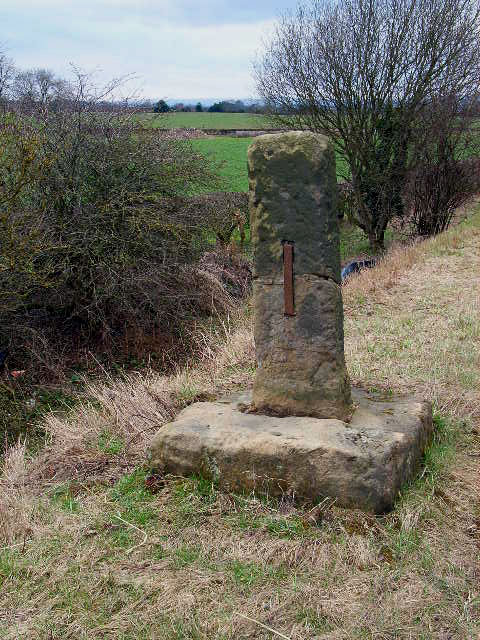
The White Cross at Great Crakehall was near the site of Bedale cattle market in medieval times.

The village is mentioned in Domesday Book as Crachele. It was part of the head manor of Masham. The manor lands were split between Gilli and Ulfkil before the Norman Conquest. After 1086 the manor was tenanted to two men-at-arms of the household of Count Alan of Brittany. The line of descent for the manor follows that of Ribald of Middleham, whose main tenants were named 'Crakehall', until 1624. From then it was granted by the Crown to Edward and Robert Ramsay until they granted it to John Heath and John White around 1658. Records thereafter are unclear until mention of the manor being in the possession of the Place family in the early 18th century. From 1732 to 1810 the manor was passed from Henry Goddard via Mary Turner, Watson Bowman and Anthony Hardolph Eyre to Henry Pulleine. Pulleine's granddaughter, Lady Cowell, inherited in the late 19th century. That part of the manor that was in Little Crakehall was held by the 'Crakehall' Family until the 14th century and it eventually passed to Christopher Conyers of Hornby, whose descent it followed thereafter.

The etymology of the name of the village is made of the Old Norse word kráka meaning crow or raven and the Anglian word halh meaning a nook of land. Kráka could also have been the given name to a person. Another theory is that the first part of the name refers to the corncrakes that were common in the area until at least the mid-20th century.

On the beck there used to be three mills. Low Mill and High Mill no longer exist but the 17th-century Crakehall Mill, once owned by the Neville family of Middleham Castle, is still there. The mill closed in 1930 and lay derelict until it was restored in 1980. It is open to the public in the summer.

The Northallerton to Hawes branch line of the North Eastern Railway runs to the south of the village. Crakehall railway station served the village until 1954, located where Station Cottages now stand. The privately owned Wensleydale Railway now uses the track.

== Geography and governance ==
Crakehall Beck becomes Bedale Beck as it passes through the village. Bedale Beck is a tributary of the River Swale 4.6 miles (7.4 km) to the east of the village. Crakehall is 2 miles (3.2 km) north-west of the market town of Bedale and 3 miles (4.8 km) west of Leeming Bar on the A1(M) near RAF Leeming. The smaller settlements of Kirkbridge, Langthorne and Patrick Brompton all lie within a mile of the village.

Until 2023 Crakehall was part of the Richmond (Yorks) parliamentary constituency. It was removed and added to the expanded Thirsk and Malton Constituency, in part due to areas from that constituency being created into a new seat of Wetherby and Easingwold. From 1974 to 2023 it was part of the Hambleton District, it is now administered by the unitary North Yorkshire Council. The Parish Council has six members, five represent Crakehall and one for Langthorne. The population of this ward at the Census 2011 was 1,728.

== Demography ==
Population
Year	1881	1891	1901	1911	1921	1931	1951	1961	2001	2011
Total	484	444	396	420	373	399	384	372	655	677

=== 2001 Census ===
According to the 2001 UK Census, the parish was 48.2% male and 51.8% female of the total population of 655. The religious make-up was 87.5% Christian with the rest stating no religion. The ethnic distribution was 100% White There were 297 dwellings.

=== 2011 Census ===
According to the 2011 UK Census, the parish had a total population of 677 with 49.3% male and 50.7% female. The religious make-up was 78.3% Christian, a small Jewish minority and the rest stating no religion. The ethnic distribution was 99.8% White with a small Mixed Ethnic minority. There were 300 dwellings. The wider electoral ward had the greatest proportion of White British residents of any in the whole of England.

== Community ==
Crakehall CE Primary School provides education from age 5 to 11. It is a Voluntary Controlled establishment with a pupil capacity of 90. The school is within the catchment area of Bedale High School for secondary education between age 11 and 16. The village is served by a mobile Post Office, which visits three times a week. There is one public house in the village, The Bay Horse, and a petrol station with adjoining shop. The village fields a weekend Cricket team in the Nidderdale League and a midweek evening team in the Wensleydale League.

== Religion ==
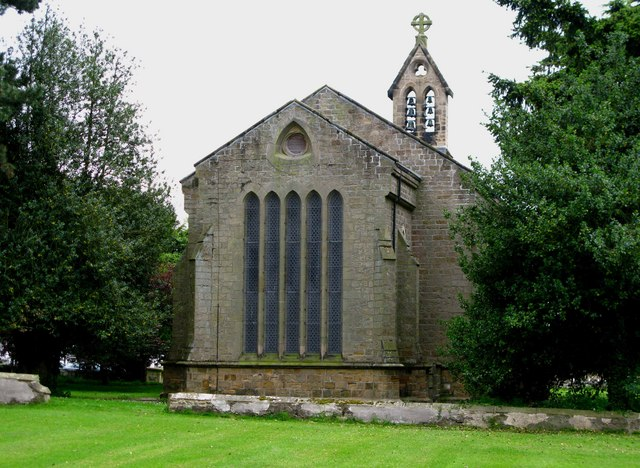
Saint Gregory Crakehall

St Gregory's Church, Crakehall, was built in 1839–1840. It is part of the Deanery of Wensley and the Archdeaconry of Richmond. The Wesleyan chapel on Station Road was built at the same time but has now moved to a newer building opposite built in 1935. The Primitive Methodists had a chapel in Little Crakehall built in 1855. When the churchyard became overcrowded a cemetery was built in Green Lane.

== Notable buildings ==
Crakehall Hall, built in 1732, overlooks the 5-acre village green. It was once the country seat of the Duke of Leeds, who lived at Kiveton Park in South Yorkshire. It is a Grade II* listed building.

A Bronze Age round barrow, identified at grid reference SE235886 as a Tumulus and 540 m south-west of the Bay Horse Inn, is a scheduled ancient monument.

The White Cross, also known as the Plague Cross, is a Grade II listed medieval cross on the N side of the A684 half a mile E of the village.

== Notable people ==
- Rev. Thomas Milville Raven FRSE (1828–1896), a pioneer photographer, was vicar of Crakehall from 1867.
