= East Hauxwell =

Village and civil parish in North Yorkshire, England

Coordinates: 54°20′21″N 1°44′35″W

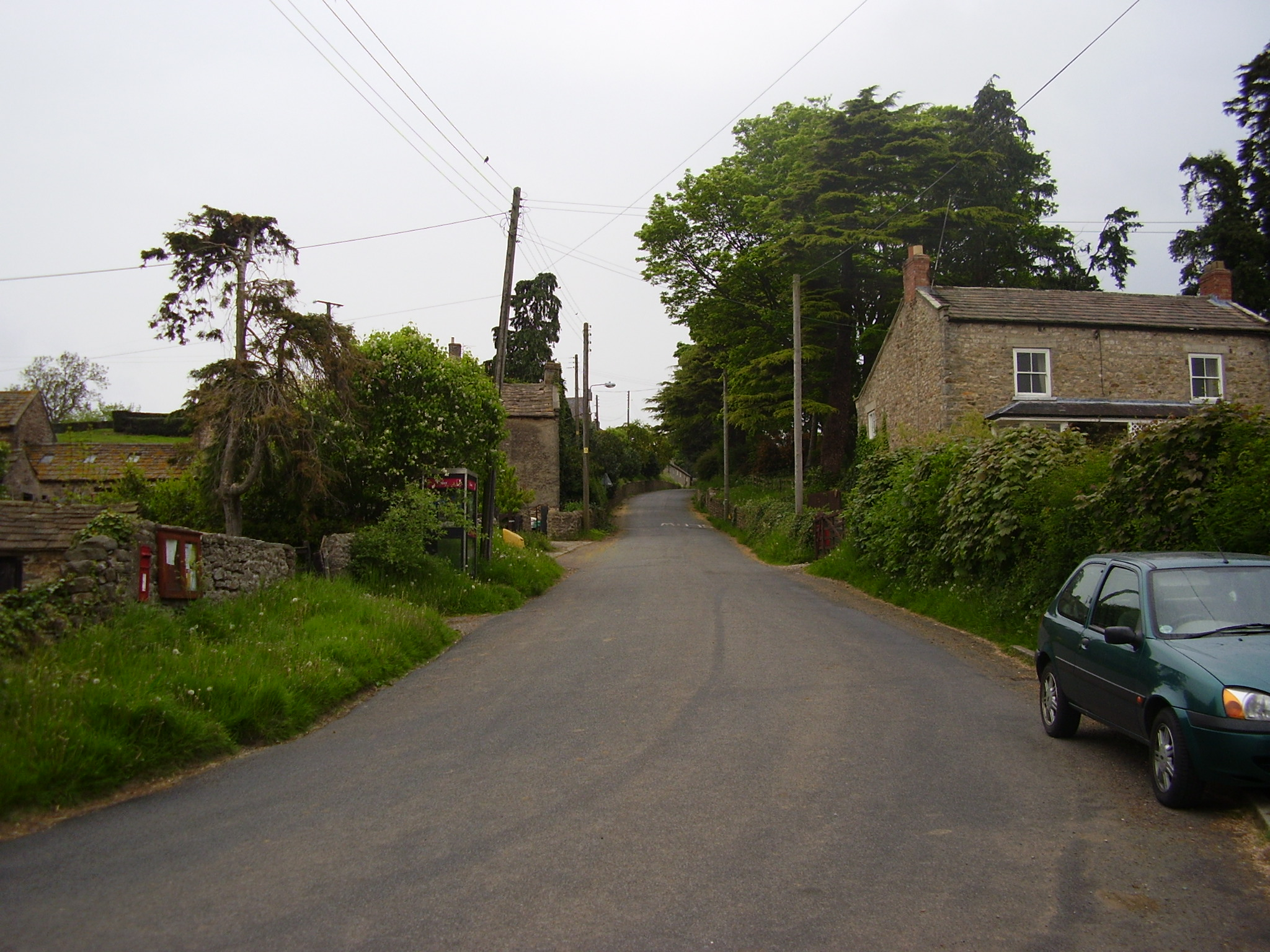
- Hauxwell

- Location within North Yorkshire
- Population: 111 (Including Barden and West Hauxwell 2011 census)
- OS grid reference: SE174931
- Unitary authority: North Yorkshire
- Ceremonial county: North Yorkshire
- Region: Yorkshire and the Humber
- Country: England
- Sovereign state: United Kingdom
- Post town: Leyburn
- Postcode district: DL8
- Police: North Yorkshire
- Fire: North Yorkshire
- Ambulance: Yorkshire

East Hauxwell or Hauxwell is a village and civil parish in North Yorkshire, England. It is located south of Catterick Garrison.

From 1974 to 2023 it was part of the district of Richmondshire, it is now administered by the unitary North Yorkshire Council.

To the west of the village lies the Grade II* listed Hauxwell Hall, a 17th-century country house belonging to the Dalton family.

The name Hauxwell probably derives from the Old English Hafocswella meaning 'Hafoc's spring' or 'hawk's spring'. Alternatively, the first element may be derived from the Old Norse personal name Haukr.

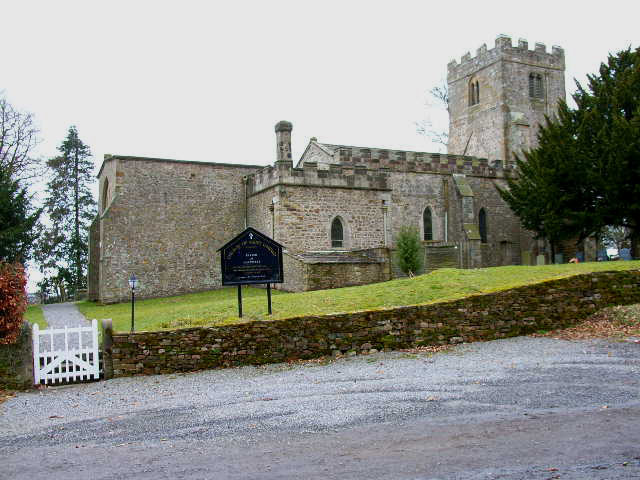
St Oswald's Church dates from around 1200

== Notable people ==
- Sir Richard Dalton
- Mark Pattison
- Dorothy Wyndlow Pattison ("Sister Dora")

== See also ==
- Listed buildings in East Hauxwell
- Listed buildings in West Hauxwell
