= Church of St Patrick, Patrick Brompton =

Anglican church in North Yorkshire, England

St Patrick's Church
- Church of St Patrick, Patrick Brompton
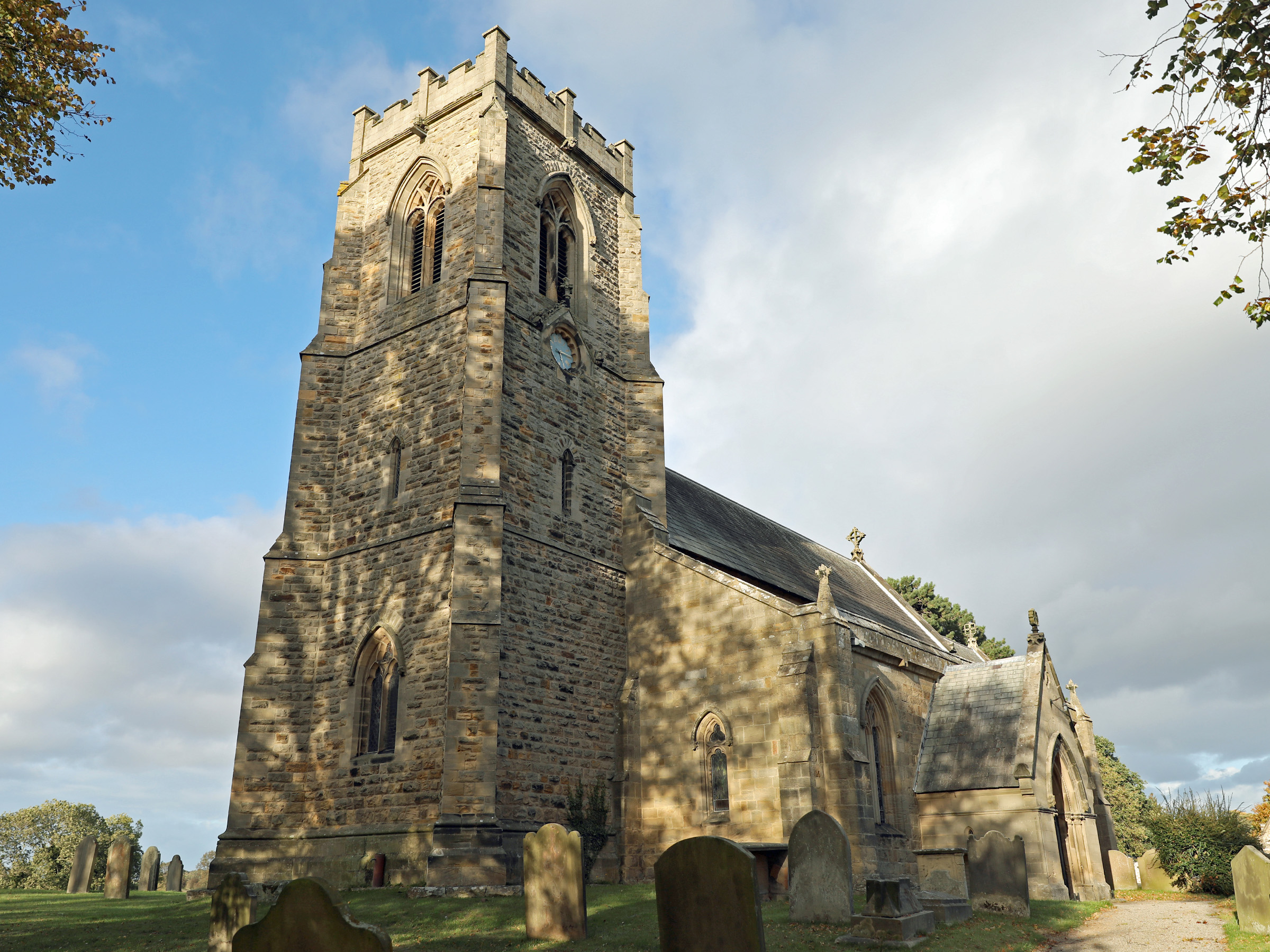
- Church of St Patrick, Patrick Brompton

- Location within North Yorkshire
- 54.3114°N 1.6646°W
- OS grid reference: SE 21910 90701
- Location: Patrick Brompton, North Yorkshire
- Country: England
- Denomination: Church of England
- Website: Official website

History
- Status: Active
- Dedication: St Patrick

Architecture
- Style: Early English

Administration
- Diocese: Leeds
- Archdeaconry: Richmond and Craven
- Deanery: Wensley
- Benefice: Lower Wensleydale
- Parish: Patrick Brompton (460432)

Clergy
- Vicar: Reverend Chris Lawton

Listed Building – Grade I
- Designated: 13 February 1967
- Reference no.: 1157773

The Church of St Patrick, is the parish church for the village and parish of Patrick Brompton in North Yorkshire, England. The church is one of six in the Benefice of Lower Wensleydale and the oldest parts of the building date back to the 11th century. It is 6 miles (9.7 km) south east of Richmond and 4 miles (6 km) north of Bedale situated on the A684 road.

It is only one of two churches in Yorkshire to be dedicated to St Patrick.

== History ==
Reference to a church at Patric Brumpton [sic] was first made in the 12th century, though it is believed that a place of worship had existed on the site for some time before that. The present church structure is largely from the 12th, 13th and 14th centuries, though there have been some modifications, alterations and additions over the years. The church, which is now a grade I listed structure, underwent a restoration in 1864, financed by Jonathan Rigg, son of the incumbent Rector, Hugh Rigg and owner of a tea plantation at Jasinga in Java (modern Indonesia). An attribution to the renovations appears on a marble memorial stone (see image in sidebar) at the rear of the church, adjacent to the door and the initials JR appear in the stone arch over the front entry. It is only one of two Anglican churches in Yorkshire which are dedicated to St Patrick, (the other being St Patrick's Church, Patrington). However, the dedication is first referred to in 1230, and may be in honour of Ghile Patraic (sometimes styled as Gilepatric and Gille Patraic) (possibly a feudal name: ), who was a landowner at the time of the conquest. One source states that a carved niche in the chancel used to hold a statue of St Patrick.

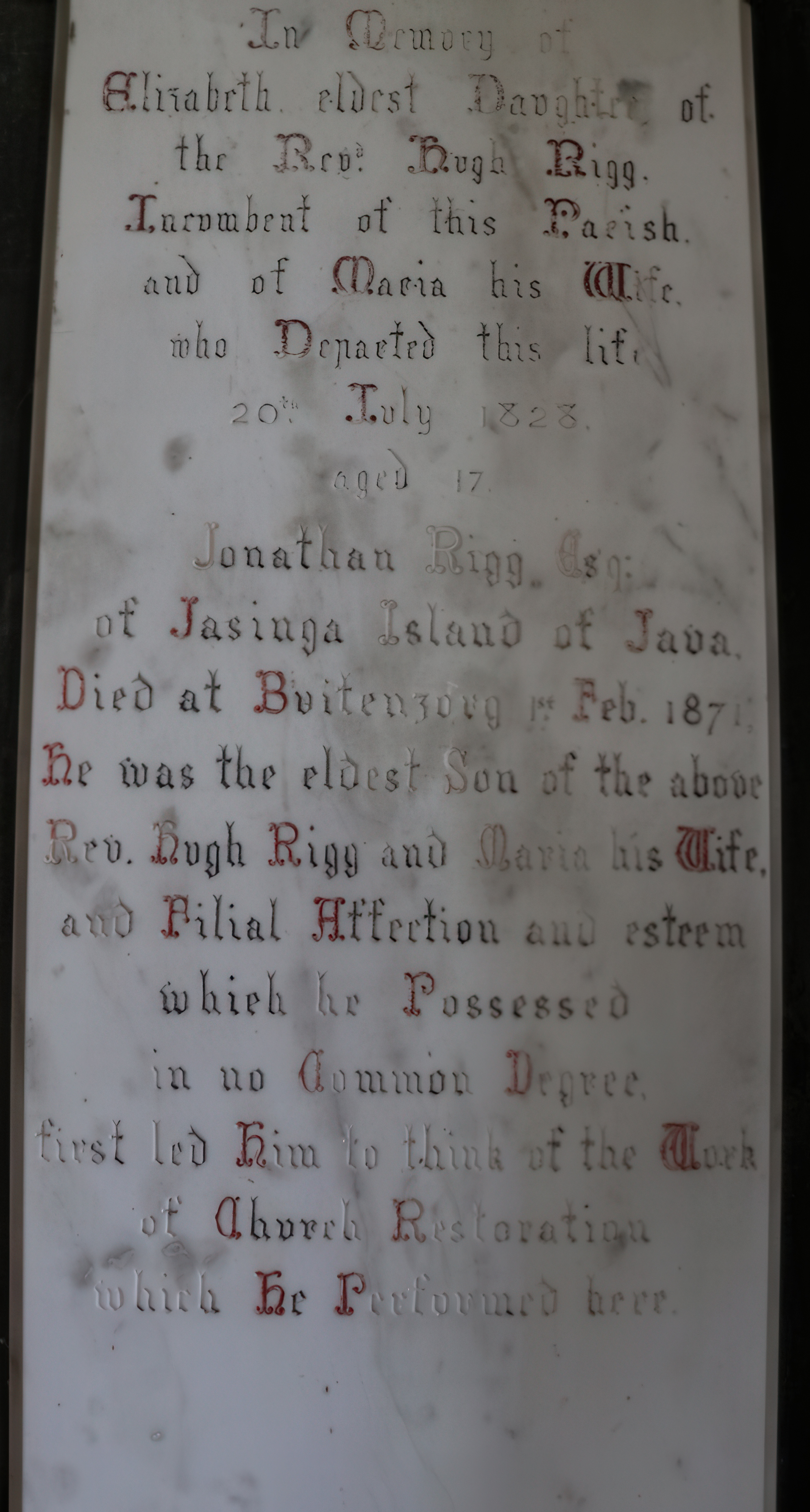
Memorial marble mentioning Jonathan Rigg's contribution to church renovations

The church consists of two aisles either side of the nave, an east facing chancel, with a vestry to the north, and a porch to the south near the tower, which is at the west. Most of the internal fabric of the building is 12th century, whilst the walls are 14th century, though both the porch and the tower are modern additions. Most of the architecture is Early English, part from the chancel which is in the Decorated style. The church is largely built of sandstone with Westmorland slates on the roof. It is said that its design and use of stone was due to it being in the patronage of St Mary's Abbey in York, as its appearance was quite lavish for a remote parish church. The tower was erected in the 19th century to replace an older tower dating back to 1577. This tower also replaced an even earlier steeple that was blown down during a storm. Dates regarding the destruction of the tower are varied with some stating 1577 and others 1672. The Victorian renovation of the tower gave it a pyramid style roof which was seen as a bad decision architecturally in comparison to the church; one geographical diarist described it as "a deformity".

The tower houses three bells, dated 1400, 1686 and 1703. The bell from 1686 contains an inscription Pervvla per magnam prebabat cima rviam i place, which loosely translates as a very little crack, occasioned great ruin and is thought to refer to the destruction of the steeple during the storm of 1577.

The north-east end of the church building still shows marks where archers sharpened their arrows between 1100 and 1500. Many decrees by kings stated that the men of the parish should practise their archery skills on holy days should they be needed in times of war.

== Churchyard ==
The churchyard contains several gravestones which are listed structures. There is also a memorial to the dead of the parish from the First World War and two Commonwealth war graves. Outside the porch door is an octagonal column with a sundial placed upon it which is inscribed with Geoge Smythes, Bedal[sic]. The sundial mentions Newfoundland and Maryland and is thought to commemorate those from the parish who went to be settlers in the New World.

== Parish details ==
The church is in the Benefice of Lower Wenseydale and is one of six in that benefice, the other five are St Andrews Finghall, St Gregory's Crakehall, St Michael Spennithorne, St Oswald's Hauxwell and St Mary's church in Hornby. The Parish of Patrick Brompton (parish code 460432) includes the villages of Hunton and Newton-le-Willows.

Attendance at the church was an average of 25 people per week in 2017. This was down from 35 per week on average in 2008.

== Clergy ==
Vicars incumbent at St Patrick's are recorded as far back as 1300. Listings are taken from H.B. McCall's Richmondshire Churches and church records.

Year	Incumbent	Year	Incumbent	Year	Incumbent
1300	Thomas	1490	John Wrangwych	1792	John Baines
1324	Hugh de Bargh (Note: McCall states the surname to be de Burgh.)	1525	William Farrer	1802	Thomas Hattersley
1352	John de Heslerton	1575	George Askwith	1803	Edward Hardy
1358	Thomas Nevil‡	1592	John Leadbeater	1811	Hugh Rigg
1359	William de Strode	1600	Peter Baines	1866	John Thompson
1369	John de Waltham‡	1606	Thomas Beane	1889	Christopher Norton Wright
1370	Adam le Thornton	1619	George Slater	1894	Reginald Edward Pownell
1389	William Lane	1625	Laurence Newton	1919	John Fotherley Dale Chapman
1390	John Belnerge	1654	William Sagg	1936	Henry Crick♦ (Note: Whitfield states that Crick went blind and ceased to be the vicar in 1945.)
1390	John de Popilton	1673	John Place	1971	Benjamin William Crawford
1420	William Clynt‡	1696	Matthew Wood	1975	William Frederick Greetham
1423	Guy de Wesham	1721	Richard Thistlethwaite	1982	Raymond Joseph Pearson
1429	Alan Humbreston†	1724	George Scott†	1995	David James Christie (Note: Was also Assistant Dean of the Deanery of Wensley.)
1440	William Hambold	1741	Gregory Elsley	2010	Bryan Dixon
1441	Nicholas Mallom	1766	Thomas Harrison	2017	Chris Lawton
1490	Robert Coppyng	1774	John Patrickson		

- †Died in office
- ‡Resigned office
- ♦Interregnum between incumbent and previous when dates are incorrect, period appears too long or records are incomplete.

== See also ==
- Grade I listed buildings in North Yorkshire (district)
- Listed buildings in Patrick Brompton
