= Akebar =

Township and civil parish in North Yorkshire, England

Coordinates: 54.3103°N 1.71165°W

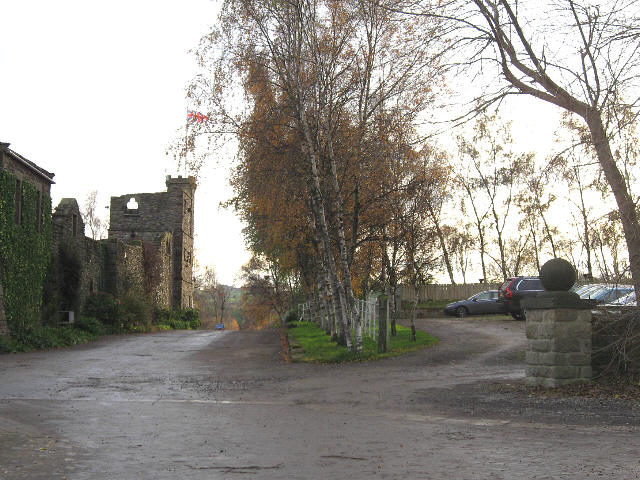
- The folly and ruins at the entrance to the campsite

- Location within North Yorkshire
- OS grid reference: SE188905
- Unitary authority: North Yorkshire
- Ceremonial county: North Yorkshire
- Region: Yorkshire and the Humber
- Country: England
- Sovereign state: United Kingdom
- Post town: LEYBURN
- Postcode district: DL8
- Police: North Yorkshire
- Fire: North Yorkshire
- Ambulance: Yorkshire

Akebar is a township and civil parish in North Yorkshire, England, about eight miles south of Richmond. It consists of a caravan site, as well as several farm houses, a public house and folly. The civil parish as a whole consists of several farm houses. At the 2011 Census the population was less than 100. Information regarding the combined statistics can be found in the parish of Finghall.

From 1974 to 2023 it was part of the district of Richmondshire, it is now administered by the unitary North Yorkshire Council.

== History ==
The name of Akebar is Danish in origin and is one of Yorkshire's lost villages. It was a village settlement even before the Viking invasion when James the Deacon, a disciple of St. Paulinus, established an early church at Akebar in the 7th century AD. The present church of St. Andrew, on the edge of the park, was built in the 11th century on the position of the first church. It is still an active and well loved church.

The township of Akebar was mentioned in the records of Jervaulx Abbey in 1290. It remained a grange farm for Jervaulx, a daughter monastery of the Cistercian Order at Fountains Abbey, until the dissolution of the monasteries around 1530. The Abbot and Monks of Jervaulx were well known for their excellent cheese, named Wensleydale, and famous for the breeding of horses of exceptional quality and bravery. It is recorded that a large number of their brood mares were kept at the grange farms at Akebar.

== Akebar Park ==
Akebar Park is a caravan park located in Yorkshire county. The park contains an 18 hole golf course. The park is planning to remove nine holes from its golf course to provide land for 27 holiday homes.

== See also ==
- Listed buildings in Akebar
