= Patrick Brompton =

Village and civil parish in North Yorkshire, England

Coordinates: 54°18′43″N 1°39′42″W

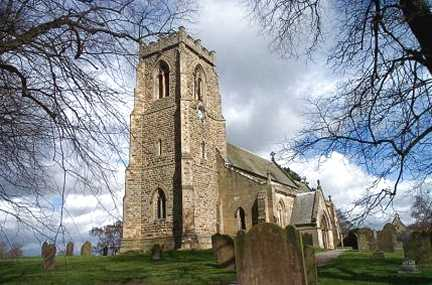
- St Patrick's Church

- Location within North Yorkshire
- Population: 167 (2011 Census)
- OS grid reference: SE220907
- Civil parish: Patrick Brompton
- Unitary authority: North Yorkshire
- Ceremonial county: North Yorkshire
- Region: Yorkshire and the Humber
- Country: England
- Sovereign state: United Kingdom
- Post town: Bedale
- Postcode district: DL8
- Dialling code: 01677
- Police: North Yorkshire
- Fire: North Yorkshire
- Ambulance: Yorkshire

Patrick Brompton is a village and civil parish in North Yorkshire, England. Patrick Brompton is situated about 4 miles (6.4 km) west of Bedale. It lies on the A684. The population of the parish at the 2001 Census was 155, rising to 167 at the 2011 Census. North Yorkshire County Council estimated the population to be at 170 in 2015.

St Patrick's Church is located in the centre of the village as well as the village pub, The Green Tree. The village is approximately 235 miles (378 km) from London and 35 miles (56 km) from Middlesbrough. The nearest primary school is Crakehall C of E Primary School in Great Crakehall, 1.2 miles (1.9 km) away. The Brompton Beck, which feeds into Bedale Beck, runs through the centre of the village.

== Parish history ==
In the 1880s, Patrick Brompton was described as:

a township and a parish in Leyburn district, N. R. Yorkshire. The township lies on an affluent of the river Swale, near the Northallerton and Leyburn railway, 4 miles NW by W of Bedale.

The village of Patrick Brompton and other villages in the parish are mentioned in the Domesday Book which was completed in 1086. When published, there were 27 households in the village consisting of 22 villagers and 5 smallholders. The 'Hundred', Count Alan also had 195 other places including Bedale and Bellerby. The name 'Patrick Brompton' derives from the Old Irish personal name 'Patrick' (see ) and Brompton derives from 'broom', a thorny bush or shrub and 'tun' deriving from an enclosure; a village; an estate. Patrick Brompton is also mentioned on the GENUKI website and in the 1820s, described as:

Patrick Brompton, (or East Brompton) a parish in the wapentake of Hang East & liberty of Richmondshire; 3½ miles NW. of Bedale. Here is a church dedicated to St. Patrick; the living is a Perpetual curacy, in the patronage of the Bishop of Chester. Here is a school endowed with about £20. per annum. Population, 158.

St Patrick's is the only church in the village and is part of the Anglican Diocese of Leeds.

Other villages in the parish are Arrathorne, Hunton and Newton-le-Willows. According to the 2011 census data, 137 people follow Christianity.

From 1974 to 2023 it was part of the district of Richmondshire, it is now administered by the unitary North Yorkshire Council.

== Population and Industry ==
It had a population of 167 according to the 2011 census. By looking at 2011 census data we can see the age structure of the village. The mean age of the village is 49.8 and the age variable with the highest number is 45 to 59 with 50 people. This is 29.9% of the population. This suggests that the population of the village are of working ability and leave the village every day for work purposes. On the right you can see a population time series graph showing the population of Patrick Brompton from 1801 to 2011. It displays a sharp drop in population around 1850. From the 1881 census data, we can see that agriculture is a primary source of work or occupation with 20 people from the village working in that field. Census data from 2011 now shows that the male population of Patrick Brompton work primarily in construction with 10 people, then 8 males working in manufacturing.

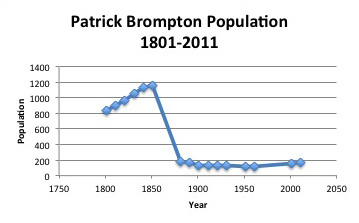
Population of Patrick Brompton, 1801 to 2011

The dramatic drop in population around 1850 could be because the parish boundaries have changed over time.

== Transport ==
The A684 runs through the village and the A1(M) motorway is approximately 5 miles (8 km) to the east of the village and 4 hours direct to London. The nearest railway station is 9 miles (14 km) away in Northallerton, which lies on the East Coast Main Line. There is also a station in Thirsk, which is 13 miles (21 km) away, also lying on the East Coast Main Line. The nearest international airport is Teesside International Airport, approximately 35 minutes away.

== Housing ==
According to the Office for National Statistics, there are 83 dwellings in Patrick Brompton, 48 of these being detached houses or bungalows. The average asking house price in Patrick Brompton is £309,000. In the history of housing in the village there was a sharp decrease in homes in the village from 265 in the 1851 census. to 36 in the 1881 census. This is similar, in the population figures, this could be because parish boundaries changed over this time.

== Climate ==
The average climate in Patrick Brompton ranges from a high of 20.4 degrees Celsius in July and a low of 1.4 degrees Celsius in December.

== See also ==
- Listed buildings in Patrick Brompton
