= List of United Kingdom locations: Si-Sm =

The United Kingdom

This is part of the list of United Kingdom locations: a gazetteer of place names in the United Kingdom showing each place's locality and geographical coordinates.

This list includes several locations on the Isle of Man, which is not part of the United Kingdom.

== Si ==
Location	Locality	Coordinates (links to map & photo sources)	OS grid reference
Siabost	Western Isles	58.31°N 06.68°W	NB2646
Siabost bho Dheas	Western Isles	58.31°N 06.69°W	NB2546
Siabost bho Thuath	Western Isles	58.32°N 06.68°W	NB2647
Siadar	Western Isles	58.39°N 06.48°W	NB3854
Siadar Iarach	Western Isles	58.39°N 06.46°W	NB3954
Siadar Uarach	Western Isles	58.39°N 06.48°W	NB3854
Sibbaldbie	Dumfries and Galloway	55.17°N 03.35°W	NY1487
Sibbertoft	Northamptonshire	52.43°N 01.00°W	SP6882
Sibdon Carwood	Shropshire	52.44°N 02.86°W	SO4183
Sibertswold / Shepherdswell	Kent	51.17°N 01.21°E	TR2547
Sibford Ferris	Oxfordshire	52.03°N 01.49°W	SP3537
Sibford Gower	Oxfordshire	52.03°N 01.49°W	SP3537
Sible Hedingham	Essex	51.97°N 00.57°E	TL7734
Sibley's Green	Essex	51.92°N 00.34°E	TL6128
Sibsey	Lincolnshire	53.03°N 00.01°E	TF3550
Sibsey Fen Side	Lincolnshire	53.04°N 00.00°E	TF3452
Sibson	Cambridgeshire	52.56°N 00.39°W	TL0997
Sibson	Leicestershire	52.59°N 01.48°W	SK3500
Sibthorpe	Nottinghamshire	52.99°N 00.86°W	SK7645
Sibthorpe Place	Nottinghamshire	53.24°N 00.92°W	SK7273
Sibton	Suffolk	52.26°N 01.45°E	TM3669
Sicklesmere	Suffolk	52.20°N 00.73°E	TL8760
Sicklinghall	North Yorkshire	53.92°N 01.45°W	SE3648
Sid	Devon	50.68°N 03.23°W	SY1388
Sidbrook	Somerset	51.03°N 03.07°W	ST2527
Sidbury	Devon	50.71°N 03.23°W	SY1391
Sidbury	Shropshire	52.46°N 02.47°W	SO6885
Sidcot	North Somerset	51.30°N 02.83°W	ST4257
Sidcup	Bexley	51.42°N 00.09°E	TQ4672
Siddal	Calderdale	53.70°N 01.84°W	SE1023
Siddick	Cumbria	54.66°N 03.55°W	NY0031
Siddington	Gloucestershire	51.68°N 01.95°W	SU0399
Siddington	Cheshire	53.23°N 02.24°W	SJ8471
Siddington Heath	Cheshire	53.22°N 02.25°W	SJ8370
Sidemoor	Worcestershire	52.33°N 02.07°W	SO9571
Side of the Moor	Bolton	53.60°N 02.39°W	SD7412
Sidestrand	Norfolk	52.90°N 01.35°E	TG2639
Sideway	City of Stoke-on-Trent	52.98°N 02.19°W	SJ8743
Sidford	Devon	50.70°N 03.23°W	SY1390
Sidinish	Western Isles	57.54°N 07.23°W	NF8763
Sidlesham	West Sussex	50.77°N 00.79°W	SZ8598
Sidlesham Common	West Sussex	50.79°N 00.79°W	SU8500
Sidley	East Sussex	50.85°N 00.47°E	TQ7409
Sidlow	Surrey	51.19°N 00.21°W	TQ2546
Sidmouth	Devon	50.67°N 03.24°W	SY1287
Sidway	Staffordshire	52.94°N 02.35°W	SJ7639
Sigford	Devon	50.54°N 03.73°W	SX7773
Sigglesthorne	East Riding of Yorkshire	53.88°N 00.25°W	TA1545
Sighthill	City of Glasgow	55.86°N 04.23°W	NS6066
Sighthill	City of Edinburgh	55.92°N 03.29°W	NT1971
Sigingstone	The Vale Of Glamorgan	51.42°N 03.48°W	SS9771
Signet	Oxfordshire	51.78°N 01.65°W	SP2410
Sigwells	Somerset	51.00°N 02.51°W	ST6423
Silchester	Hampshire	51.35°N 01.11°W	SU6262
Sildinis	Western Isles	58.07°N 06.61°W	NB2819
Sileby	Leicestershire	52.72°N 01.11°W	SK6015
Silecroft	Cumbria	54.21°N 03.33°W	SD1381
Silfield	Norfolk	52.54°N 01.12°E	TM1299
Silford	Devon	51.03°N 04.24°W	SS4328
Silian	Ceredigion	52.13°N 04.09°W	SN5751
Silkstead	Hampshire	51.01°N 01.37°W	SU4424
Silkstone	Barnsley	53.54°N 01.57°W	SE2805
Silkstone Common	Barnsley	53.53°N 01.56°W	SE2904
Silk Willoughby	Lincolnshire	52.96°N 00.43°W	TF0542
Sillerhole	Fife	56.20°N 03.00°W	NO3802
Silloth	Cumbria	54.86°N 03.38°W	NY1153
Siloh	Carmarthenshire	52.01°N 03.85°W	SN7337
Silpho	North Yorkshire	54.31°N 00.52°W	SE9692
Silsden	Bradford	53.91°N 01.94°W	SE0446
Silsoe	Bedfordshire	52.00°N 00.44°W	TL0735
Silton	Dorset	51.06°N 02.31°W	ST7829
Silverbank	Aberdeenshire	57.05°N 02.47°W	NO7196
Silverburn	Midlothian	55.82°N 03.27°W	NT2060
Silverdale	Lancashire	54.16°N 02.82°W	SD4675
Silverdale	Staffordshire	53.01°N 02.28°W	SJ8146
Silverdale Green	Lancashire	54.15°N 02.82°W	SD4674
Silver End	Dudley	52.47°N 02.13°W	SO9186
Silver End	Essex	51.84°N 00.61°E	TL8019
Silvergate	Norfolk	52.79°N 01.21°E	TG1727
Silver Green	Norfolk	52.48°N 01.31°E	TM2593
Silver Hill	East Sussex	50.99°N 00.46°E	TQ7325
Silverhill	East Sussex	50.86°N 00.55°E	TQ8010
Silverhill Park	East Sussex	50.87°N 00.55°E	TQ8011
Silver Knap	Somerset	51.01°N 02.48°W	ST6624
Silverknowes	City of Edinburgh	55.97°N 03.28°W	NT2076
Silvermuir	South Lanarkshire	55.68°N 03.73°W	NS9145
Silverstone	Northamptonshire	52.09°N 01.03°W	SP6644
Silver Street (Wells)	Somerset	51.08°N 02.65°W	ST5432
Silver Street (Taunton)	Somerset	50.98°N 03.18°W	ST1721
Silver Street	Worcestershire	52.37°N 01.89°W	SP0775
Silver Street	Gloucestershire	51.70°N 02.31°W	SO7801
Silver Street	Kent	51.30°N 00.68°E	TQ8760
Silverton	Devon	50.80°N 03.49°W	SS9502
Silverton	West Dunbartonshire	55.94°N 04.56°W	NS4075
Silvertonhill	South Lanarkshire	55.76°N 04.04°W	NS7254
Silvertown	Greenwich	51.49°N 00.02°E	TQ4179
Silverwell	Cornwall	50.28°N 05.17°W	SW7448
Silvington	Shropshire	52.40°N 02.56°W	SO6279
Silwick	Shetland Islands	60.16°N 01.47°W	HU2942
Sim Hill	Barnsley	53.50°N 01.56°W	SE2901
Simister	Manchester	53.54°N 02.25°W	SD8305
Simmondley	Derbyshire	53.43°N 01.98°W	SK0193
Simm's Cross	Cheshire	53.35°N 02.73°W	SJ5185
Simm's Lane End	St Helens	53.49°N 02.69°W	SD5400
Simonburn	Northumberland	55.05°N 02.20°W	NY8773
Simonsbath	Somerset	51.13°N 03.75°W	SS7739
Simonsburrow	Devon	50.93°N 03.22°W	ST1416
Simonside	South Tyneside	54.96°N 01.47°W	NZ3463
Simonstone	Lancashire	53.80°N 02.35°W	SD7734
Simonstone	North Yorkshire	54.31°N 02.20°W	SD8791
Simpson	Milton Keynes	52.00°N 00.71°W	SP8835
Simpson	Pembrokeshire	51.82°N 05.07°W	SM8818
Simpson Cross	Pembrokeshire	51.82°N 05.06°W	SM8919
Simpson Green	Bradford	53.83°N 01.72°W	SE1838
Sinclair's Hill	Scottish Borders	55.74°N 02.30°W	NT8150
Sinclairston	East Ayrshire	55.41°N 04.41°W	NS4716
Sinclairtown	Fife	56.12°N 03.14°W	NT2993
Sinderby	North Yorkshire	54.22°N 01.47°W	SE3481
Sinderhope	Northumberland	54.85°N 02.25°W	NY8451
Sinderland Green	Trafford	53.40°N 02.40°W	SJ7390
Sindlesham	Berkshire	51.41°N 00.89°W	SU7769
Sinfin	Derbyshire	52.87°N 01.49°W	SK3431
Sinfin Moor	City of Derby	52.87°N 01.48°W	SK3531
Singleborough	Buckinghamshire	51.98°N 00.89°W	SP7632
Single Hill	Somerset	51.30°N 02.40°W	ST7256
Singleton	West Sussex	50.91°N 00.76°W	SU8713
Singleton	Lancashire	53.83°N 02.94°W	SD3838
Singlewell	Kent	51.40°N 00.37°E	TQ6570
Singret	Wrexham	53.08°N 02.98°W	SJ3455
Sinkhurst Green	Kent	51.14°N 00.58°E	TQ8142
Sinnington	North Yorkshire	54.25°N 00.86°W	SE7485
Sinton	Worcestershire	52.26°N 02.23°W	SO8463
Sinton Green	Worcestershire	52.23°N 02.27°W	SO8160
Sion Hill	Bath and North East Somerset	51.39°N 02.37°W	ST7466
Sipson	Hillingdon	51.49°N 00.46°W	TQ0778
Sirhowy	Blaenau Gwent	51.78°N 03.24°W	SO1410
Sisland	Norfolk	52.52°N 01.44°E	TM3498
Sissinghurst	Kent	51.10°N 00.55°E	TQ7937
Siston	South Gloucestershire	51.47°N 02.46°W	ST6875
Siston Common	South Gloucestershire	51.46°N 02.49°W	ST6674
Sithney	Cornwall	50.10°N 05.31°W	SW6328
Sithney Common	Cornwall	50.10°N 05.30°W	SW6428
Sithney Green	Cornwall	50.11°N 05.30°W	SW6429
Sittingbourne	Kent	51.33°N 00.72°E	TQ9063
Sittyton	Aberdeenshire	57.27°N 02.25°W	NJ8520
Six Ashes	Shropshire	52.48°N 02.31°W	SO7988
Six Bells	Blaenau Gwent	51.72°N 03.13°W	SO2203
Sixhills	Lincolnshire	53.36°N 00.24°W	TF1787
Six Hills	Leicestershire	52.77°N 01.05°W	SK6420
Sixmile	Kent	51.15°N 01.04°E	TR1344
Sixpenny Handley	Dorset	50.95°N 02.01°W	ST9917
Sizewell	Suffolk	52.19°N 01.61°E	TM4761

== Sk ==
Location	Locality	Coordinates (links to map & photo sources)	OS grid reference
Skaigh	Devon	50.72°N 03.95°W	SX6293
Skaill	Orkney Islands	58.94°N 02.73°W	HY5806
Skallary	Western Isles	56.96°N 07.44°W	NL6999
Skares	East Ayrshire	55.42°N 04.34°W	NS5217
Skaw	Shetland Islands	60.37°N 00.93°W	HU5966
Skaw Taing	Shetland Islands	60.38°N 00.91°W	HU600667
Skeabrae	Orkney Islands	59.06°N 03.27°W	HY2720
Skeeby	North Yorkshire	54.41°N 01.70°W	NZ1902
Skeete	Kent	51.12°N 01.04°E	TR1341
Skeffington	Leicestershire	52.61°N 00.90°W	SK7402
Skeffling	East Riding of Yorkshire	53.64°N 00.07°E	TA3719
Skegby (Ashfield)	Nottinghamshire	53.14°N 01.26°W	SK4961
Skegby (Bassetlaw)	Nottinghamshire	53.22°N 00.83°W	SK7870
Skeggie	Shetland Islands	60.79°N 00.82°W	HP6413
Skegness	Lincolnshire	53.14°N 00.33°E	TF5663
Skelberry (Boddam)	Shetland Islands	59.92°N 01.30°W	HU3916
Skelberry (Fladda)	Shetland Islands	60.55°N 01.34°W	HU3686
Skelbo	Highland	57.92°N 04.04°W	NH7995
Skelbo Muir	Highland	57.91°N 04.06°W	NH7893
Skelbrooke	Doncaster	53.60°N 01.24°W	SE5012
Skelda Ness	Shetland Islands	60.15°N 01.46°W	HU299409
Skeldyke	Lincolnshire	52.91°N 00.02°W	TF3337
Skelfhill	Scottish Borders	55.32°N 02.86°W	NT4504
Skellingthorpe	Lincolnshire	53.22°N 00.62°W	SK9271
Skellister	Shetland Islands	60.26°N 01.17°W	HU4654
Skellorn Green	Cheshire	53.32°N 02.12°W	SJ9281
Skellow	Doncaster	53.58°N 01.20°W	SE5310
Skelmanthorpe	Kirklees	53.58°N 01.65°W	SE2310
Skelmersdale	Lancashire	53.54°N 02.78°W	SD4806
Skelmorlie	North Ayrshire	55.86°N 04.89°W	NS1967
Skelpick	Highland	58.46°N 04.19°W	NC7255
Skelton	Cumbria	54.70°N 02.88°W	NY4335
Skelton	East Riding of Yorkshire	53.71°N 00.84°W	SE7625
Skelton	North Yorkshire	54.40°N 01.85°W	SZ0901
Skelton	York	53.99°N 01.13°W	SE5756
Skelton-in-Cleveland	Redcar and Cleveland	54.55°N 00.99°W	NZ6518
Skelton-on-Ure	North Yorkshire	54.10°N 01.45°W	SE3668
Skelwick	Orkney Islands	59.28°N 02.91°W	HY4844
Skelwith Bridge	Cumbria	54.41°N 03.01°W	NY3403
Skendleby	Lincolnshire	53.19°N 00.13°E	TF4369
Skendleby Psalter	Lincolnshire	53.21°N 00.14°E	TF4371
Skenfrith	Monmouthshire	51.87°N 02.80°W	SO4520
Skerne	East Riding of Yorkshire	53.98°N 00.41°W	TA0455
Skerne Park	Darlington	54.50°N 01.56°W	NZ2812
Skerray	Highland	58.53°N 04.30°W	NC6663
Skerryford	Pembrokeshire	51.78°N 05.01°W	SM9214
Skerry of Eshaness	Shetland Islands	60.47°N 01.63°W	HU201762
Skerryvore	Argyll and Bute	56.32°N 07.11°W	NL840263
Skerton	Lancashire	54.06°N 02.81°W	SD4763
Sketchley	Leicestershire	52.52°N 01.38°W	SP4292
Sketty	Swansea	51.61°N 03.99°W	SS6292
Skewen	Neath Port Talbot	51.65°N 03.85°W	SS7297
Skewes	Cornwall	50.44°N 04.87°W	SW9665
Skewsby	North Yorkshire	54.13°N 01.05°W	SE6271
Skeyton	Norfolk	52.77°N 01.31°E	TG2425
Skeyton Corner	Norfolk	52.79°N 01.33°E	TG2527
Skidbrooke	Lincolnshire	53.40°N 00.16°E	TF4492
Skidbrooke North End	Lincolnshire	53.42°N 00.16°E	TF4494
Skidby	East Riding of Yorkshire	53.78°N 00.46°W	TA0133
Skilgate	Somerset	51.03°N 03.45°W	SS9827
Skilling	Dorset	50.72°N 02.76°W	SY4692
Skillington	Lincolnshire	52.81°N 00.68°W	SK8925
Skinburness	Cumbria	54.88°N 03.37°W	NY1255
Skinflats	Falkirk	56.02°N 03.76°W	NS9083
Skinidin	Highland	57.42°N 06.63°W	NG2247
Skinner's Bottom	Cornwall	50.26°N 05.20°W	SW7246
Skinners Green	Berkshire	51.38°N 01.36°W	SU4465
Skinnerton	Highland	57.81°N 03.92°W	NH8682
Skinnet	Highland	58.51°N 04.43°W	NC5861
Skinningrove	Redcar and Cleveland	54.56°N 00.90°W	NZ7119
Skipness	Argyll and Bute	55.76°N 05.34°W	NR9057
Skipness Point	Argyll and Bute	55.77°N 05.33°W	NR910580
Skipper's Island	Essex	51.87°N 01.21°E	TM213249
Skippool	Lancashire	53.85°N 02.98°W	SD3540
Skiprigg	Cumbria	54.79°N 02.96°W	NY3845
Skipsea	East Riding of Yorkshire	53.97°N 00.23°W	TA1655
Skipsea Brough	East Riding of Yorkshire	53.96°N 00.23°W	TA1654
Skipton	North Yorkshire	53.95°N 02.03°W	SD9851
Skipton-on-Swale	North Yorkshire	54.20°N 01.44°W	SE3679
Skipwith	North Yorkshire	53.83°N 00.99°W	SE6638
Skirbeck	Lincolnshire	52.96°N 00.02°W	TF3343
Skirbeck Quarter	Lincolnshire	52.95°N 00.03°W	TF3242
Skirethorns	North Yorkshire	54.07°N 02.03°W	SD9864
Skirlaugh	East Riding of Yorkshire	53.83°N 00.26°W	TA1439
Skirling	Scottish Borders	55.63°N 03.47°W	NT0739
Skirlington	East Riding of Yorkshire	53.96°N 00.20°W	TA1852
Skirmett	Buckinghamshire	51.60°N 00.88°W	SU7790
Skirpenbeck	East Riding of Yorkshire	54.00°N 00.87°W	SE7457
Skirwith	Cumbria	54.68°N 02.60°W	NY6132
Skirza	Highland	58.59°N 03.06°W	ND3868
Skitby	Cumbria	54.97°N 02.87°W	NY4465
Skitham	Lancashire	53.88°N 02.88°W	SD4243
Skittle Green	Buckinghamshire	51.71°N 00.88°W	SP7702
Skokholm Island	Pembrokeshire	51.69°N 05.27°W	SM737049
Skomer Island	Pembrokeshire	51.73°N 05.29°W	SM728095
Skulamus	Highland	57.22°N 05.87°W	NG6622
Skullomie	Highland	58.50°N 04.38°W	NC6160
Skyborry Green	Shropshire	52.35°N 03.08°W	SO2674
Skye Green	Essex	51.86°N 00.71°E	TL8722
Skye of Curr	Highland	57.29°N 03.67°W	NH9924
Skyfog	Pembrokeshire	51.89°N 05.19°W	SM8027
Skyreburn	Dumfries and Galloway	54.86°N 04.23°W	NX5755
Skyreholme	North Yorkshire	54.03°N 01.90°W	SE0660

== Sl ==
Location	Locality	Coordinates (links to map & photo sources)	OS grid reference
Slack	Calderdale	53.74°N 02.04°W	SD9728
Slack	Kirklees	53.64°N 01.88°W	SE0817
Slack	Derbyshire	53.15°N 01.50°W	SK3362
Slackcote	Oldham	53.57°N 02.04°W	SD9709
Slackhall	Derbyshire	53.32°N 01.89°W	SK0781
Slackhead	Moray	57.64°N 03.00°W	NJ4062
Slack Head	Cumbria	54.19°N 02.78°W	SD4978
Slackholme End	Lincolnshire	53.20°N 00.28°E	TF5370
Slad	Gloucestershire	51.76°N 02.18°W	SO8707
Sladbrook	Gloucestershire	51.95°N 02.33°W	SO7728
Slade	Devon	50.86°N 03.26°W	ST1108
Slade	Pembrokeshire	51.80°N 04.98°W	SM9416
Slade	Kent	51.25°N 00.76°E	TQ9354
Slade End	Oxfordshire	51.60°N 01.16°W	SU5890
Slade Green	Bexley	51.46°N 00.18°E	TQ5276
Slade Heath	Staffordshire	52.65°N 02.11°W	SJ9206
Slade Hooton	Rotherham	53.39°N 01.21°W	SK5289
Sladen Green	Hampshire	51.28°N 01.41°W	SU4154
Sladesbridge	Cornwall	50.50°N 04.80°W	SX0171
Slades Green	Worcestershire	52.00°N 02.21°W	SO8534
Slaggyford	Northumberland	54.86°N 02.51°W	NY6752
Slaidburn	Lancashire	53.96°N 02.44°W	SD7152
Slaithwaite	Kirklees	53.61°N 01.88°W	SE0813
Slaley	Northumberland	54.90°N 02.04°W	NY9757
Slaley	Derbyshire	53.10°N 01.59°W	SK2757
Slamannan	Falkirk	55.93°N 03.84°W	NS8573
Slape Cross	Somerset	51.13°N 02.97°W	ST3238
Slapewath	Redcar and Cleveland	54.52°N 01.01°W	NZ6415
Slapton	Devon	50.29°N 03.65°W	SX8245
Slapton	Northamptonshire	52.10°N 01.06°W	SP6446
Slapton	Buckinghamshire	51.87°N 00.65°W	SP9320
Slateford	City of Edinburgh	55.91°N 03.24°W	NT2270
Slatepit Dale	Derbyshire	53.20°N 01.49°W	SK3468
Slattocks	Rochdale	53.56°N 02.18°W	SD8808
Slaugham	West Sussex	51.03°N 00.21°W	TQ2528
Slaughterbridge	Cornwall	50.63°N 04.68°W	SX1085
Slaughterford	Wiltshire	51.45°N 02.23°W	ST8473
Slaughter Hill	Cheshire	53.09°N 02.40°W	SJ7355
Slaughterhouse Point	Kent	51.40°N 00.68°E	TQ870706
Slawston	Leicestershire	52.53°N 00.86°W	SP7794
Slay Pits	Doncaster	53.57°N 00.98°W	SE6709
Sleaford	Hampshire	51.13°N 00.85°W	SU8038
Sleaford	Lincolnshire	52.99°N 00.42°W	TF0645
Sleagill	Cumbria	54.56°N 02.63°W	NY5919
Sleap	Shropshire	52.82°N 02.77°W	SJ4826
Sleapford	Shropshire	52.73°N 02.54°W	SJ6315
Sleapshyde	Hertfordshire	51.74°N 00.26°W	TL2006
Slebech	Pembrokeshire	51.79°N 04.87°W	SN0215
Sledge Green	Worcestershire	52.00°N 02.27°W	SO8134
Sledmere	East Riding of Yorkshire	54.06°N 00.58°W	SE9364
Sleeches Cross	East Sussex	51.08°N 00.25°E	TQ5834
Sleepers Hill	Hampshire	51.05°N 01.34°W	SU4629
Sleetbeck	Cumbria	55.07°N 02.78°W	NY5076
Sleet Moor	Derbyshire	53.07°N 01.40°W	SK4053
Sleight	Dorset	50.78°N 02.02°W	SY9898
Sleights	North Yorkshire	54.45°N 00.67°W	NZ8607
Slepe	Dorset	50.73°N 02.11°W	SY9293
Sliabh na h-Airde	Western Isles	57.46°N 07.37°W	NF7854
Slickly	Highland	58.57°N 03.22°W	ND2966
Sliddery	North Ayrshire	55.45°N 05.27°W	NR9323
Slidderywater Foot	North Ayrshire	55.44°N 05.25°W	NR941220
Slideslow	Worcestershire	52.32°N 02.04°W	SO9770
Slimbridge	Gloucestershire	51.72°N 02.39°W	SO7303
Slindon	West Sussex	50.86°N 00.63°W	SU9608
Slindon	Staffordshire	52.88°N 02.26°W	SJ8232
Slinfold	West Sussex	51.06°N 00.41°W	TQ1131
Sling	Gloucestershire	51.76°N 02.61°W	SO5807
Slingsby	North Yorkshire	54.16°N 00.94°W	SE6975
Slip End	Bedfordshire	51.85°N 00.43°W	TL0818
Slip End	Hertfordshire	52.00°N 00.13°W	TL2836
Slippery Ford	Bradford	53.85°N 02.00°W	SE0040
Slipton	Northamptonshire	52.40°N 00.60°W	SP9579
Slitting Mill	Staffordshire	52.75°N 01.97°W	SK0217
Slochnacraig	Perth and Kinross	56.79°N 03.44°W	NO1268
Slockavullin	Argyll and Bute	56.11°N 05.50°W	NR8297
Sloley	Norfolk	52.76°N 01.39°E	TG2924
Sloncombe	Devon	50.65°N 03.79°W	SX7386
Sloothby	Lincolnshire	53.20°N 00.22°E	TF4970
Slough	Powys	52.26°N 03.02°W	SO3063
Slough	Berkshire	51.50°N 00.57°W	SU9979
Slough Green	West Sussex	51.01°N 00.17°W	TQ2826
Slough Green	Somerset	50.97°N 03.04°W	ST2720
Slough Hill	Suffolk	52.13°N 00.71°E	TL8652
Sluggan	Highland	57.26°N 03.87°W	NH8721
Sluggans	Highland	57.41°N 06.21°W	NG4744
Sly Corner	Kent	51.05°N 00.79°E	TQ9632
Slyfield	Surrey	51.25°N 00.58°W	SU9952
Slyne	Lancashire	54.07°N 02.81°W	SD4765

== Sm ==
Location	Locality	Coordinates (links to map & photo sources)	OS grid reference
Smailholm	Scottish Borders	55.61°N 02.57°W	NT6436
Smallbridge	Rochdale	53.63°N 02.13°W	SD9115
Smallbrook	Devon	50.77°N 03.61°W	SX8698
Smallbrook	Gloucestershire	51.69°N 02.59°W	SO5900
Smallburgh	Norfolk	52.76°N 01.45°E	TG3324
Smallburn	East Ayrshire	55.51°N 04.09°W	NS6826
Smalldale (Peak Dale)	Derbyshire	53.29°N 01.86°W	SK0977
Smalldale (Hazlebadge)	Derbyshire	53.32°N 01.76°W	SK1681
Small Dole	West Sussex	50.89°N 00.28°W	TQ2112
Small End	Lincolnshire	53.07°N 00.14°E	TF4455
Smalley	Derbyshire	52.99°N 01.40°W	SK4044
Smalley Common	Derbyshire	52.97°N 01.39°W	SK4142
Smalley Green	Derbyshire	52.98°N 01.40°W	SK4043
Smallfield	Surrey	51.17°N 00.12°W	TQ3143
Smallford	Hertfordshire	51.74°N 00.27°W	TL1907
Small Heath	Birmingham	52.46°N 01.85°W	SP1085
Smallholm	Dumfries and Galloway	55.07°N 03.42°W	NY0977
Small Hythe	Kent	51.03°N 00.69°E	TQ8930
Smallmarsh	Devon	50.98°N 03.99°W	SS6022
Smallrice	Staffordshire	52.87°N 02.07°W	SJ9531
Smallridge	Devon	50.79°N 02.99°W	ST3000
Smallshaw	Tameside	53.49°N 02.09°W	SD9400
Smallthorne	City of Stoke-on-Trent	53.04°N 02.18°W	SJ8850
Small Way	Somerset	51.06°N 02.51°W	ST6430
Smallwood	Worcestershire	52.30°N 01.94°W	SP0467
Smallwood	Cheshire	53.13°N 02.30°W	SJ8060
Smallwood Green	Suffolk	52.19°N 00.82°E	TL9359
Smallwood Hey	Lancashire	53.92°N 02.93°W	SD3948
Smallworth	Suffolk	52.38°N 00.93°E	TM0080
Smannell	Hampshire	51.23°N 01.45°W	SU3848
Smardale	Cumbria	54.46°N 02.41°W	NY7308
Smarden	Kent	51.14°N 00.68°E	TQ8842
Smarden Bell	Kent	51.14°N 00.65°E	TQ8642
Smart's Hill	Kent	51.14°N 00.17°E	TQ5241
Smeatharpe	Devon	50.88°N 03.15°W	ST1910
Smeaton	Fife	56.12°N 03.15°W	NT2893
Smeeth	Kent	51.11°N 00.95°E	TR0739
Smeeton Westerby	Leicestershire	52.52°N 01.01°W	SP6792
Smelthouses	North Yorkshire	54.07°N 01.71°W	SE1964
Smerclate	Western Isles	57.11°N 07.38°W	NF7415
Smestow	Staffordshire	52.51°N 02.22°W	SO8591
Smethcott	Shropshire	52.58°N 02.81°W	SO4599
Smethwick	Sandwell	52.48°N 01.97°W	SP0287
Smethwick Green	Cheshire	53.16°N 02.30°W	SJ8063
Smirisary	Highland	56.82°N 05.86°W	NM6477
Smisby	Derbyshire	52.76°N 01.49°W	SK3419
Smite Hill	Worcestershire	52.22°N 02.16°W	SO8958
Smithaleigh	Devon	50.37°N 03.99°W	SX5855
Smithbrook	West Sussex	50.99°N 00.69°W	SU9223
Smith End Green	Worcestershire	52.16°N 02.33°W	SO7752
Smithfield	Cumbria	54.97°N 02.87°W	NY4465
Smith Green	Lancashire	53.97°N 02.77°W	SD4954
Smithies	Barnsley	53.56°N 01.47°W	SE3508
Smithincott	Devon	50.89°N 03.33°W	ST0611
Smithley	Barnsley	53.52°N 01.42°W	SE3803
Smith's End	Hertfordshire	52.01°N 00.03°E	TL4037
Smith's Green (Steeple Bumpstead)	Essex	52.03°N 00.41°E	TL6640
Smith's Green (Chelmsford)	Essex	51.86°N 00.27°E	TL5721
Smith's Green	Cheshire	53.07°N 02.37°W	SJ7553
Smiths Green	Cheshire	53.22°N 02.28°W	SJ8170
Smithstown	Highland	57.72°N 05.71°W	NG7977
Smithton	Highland	57.47°N 04.15°W	NH7145
Smithwood Green	Suffolk	52.13°N 00.77°E	TL9052
Smithy Bridge	Rochdale	53.63°N 02.10°W	SD9315
Smithy Gate	Flintshire	53.26°N 03.24°W	SJ1775
Smithy Green	Stockport	53.36°N 02.19°W	SJ8785
Smithy Green	Cheshire	53.26°N 02.39°W	SJ7474
Smithy Hill	Fife	56.17°N 03.06°W	NT3499
Smithy Houses	Derbyshire	53.01°N 01.43°W	SK3847
Smithy Lane Ends	Lancashire	53.60°N 02.90°W	SD4012
Smock Alley	West Sussex	50.93°N 00.45°W	TQ0916
Smockington	Warwickshire	52.49°N 01.33°W	SP4589
Smoky Row	Buckinghamshire	51.74°N 00.82°W	SP8106
Smug Oak	Hertfordshire	51.70°N 00.36°W	TL1302
Smythe's Green	Essex	51.82°N 00.78°E	TL9218
