= Skewes =

Skewes may refer to:

== People ==
- Ken Skewes (born 1984), Australian cricketer
- Peter Skewes (born 1957), American professor
- Stanley Skewes (1899–1988), South African mathematician
- Thomas Skewes-Cox (1849–1912), British politician

== Other uses ==
- Skewes's number, number theory concept
- Skewes (hamlet), hamlet in England
- Skuse, English surname
