= Lund Church =

Lund Church may refer to:

- Lund Church (Agder), a church in the municipality of Kristiansand in Agder county, Norway
- Lund Church (Rogaland), a church in the municipality of Lund in Rogaland county, Norway
- Lund Chapel, a chapel in the municipality of Nærøysund in Trøndelag county, Norway
- Lund Cathedral, a cathedral in Lund, Scania, Sweden

== See also ==
- Lunde Church (disambiguation)
- Lunds Church, in North Yorkshire, England
