= Coleby Hall =

Listed building in North Yorkshire, England

Coordinates: 54.3159°N 2.1043°W

- Former names: Bowbridge Hall

General information
- Address: Low Abbotside, Wensleydale, North Yorkshire, England
- Completed: 1655

Technical details
- Floor count: 2 + attic
- Designations

Listed Building – Grade II*
- Official name: Coleby Hall
- Designated: 9 July 1986
- Reference no.: 1316922

Coleby Hall is a historic building in Low Abbotside, a parish in Wensleydale, in North Yorkshire, in England.

The manor house was built for John Colby, and was originally named "Bowbridge Hall". Its date of construction is written over the doorways and has been interpreted as 1633, or as 1655. The building was Grade II* listed in 1986. The Yorkshire Dales National Park describes it as "one of the finest houses in Wensleydale [with] a commanding position above the Askrigg road to Bainbridge".

The house is built of roughcast stone with a stone slate roof. It has two storeys and attics, and an E-shaped plan with five bays, the outer bays projecting and gabled. The middle bay has a projecting gabled tower porch. The porch contains a round-arched doorway with moulded capitals, an ogee-chamfered arris, and a hood mould, and above it is a dated plaque. Inside the porch are stone benches, and the inner doorway is square-headed with a moulded arris. The windows are mullioned and transomed, some with hood moulds. Inside, there are some early fireplaces, a stone staircase, and parts of a plaster frieze in a first floor room.

== See also ==
- Grade II* listed buildings in North Yorkshire (district)
- Listed buildings in Low Abbotside
