= Listed buildings in High Abbotside =

High Abbotside is a civil parish in the county of North Yorkshire, England. It contains 20 listed buildings that are recorded in the National Heritage List for England. All the listed buildings are designated at Grade II, the lowest of the three grades, which is applied to "buildings of national importance and special interest". The parish contains the villages of Hardraw and Sedbusk, the hamlet of Lunds, and the surrounding countryside and moorland. The listed buildings include houses and cottages, churches, bridges, a ruined farmstead, milestones, and a school and master's house.

== Buildings ==
Name and location	Photograph	Date	Notes
Ruins of High Dyke and associated structures 54.34370°N 2.30512°W		Late 17th century	A farmstead, previously a drovers' inn, the buildings are in sandstone and are in ruins. The farmhouse has millstone grit quoins and a stone slate roof, and attached to the west is a barn. The other associated structures include a cart store, a byre, another outbuilding, the ruins of a limekiln, and a set of drystone walled paddocks.
Johnny Kirks Cottage; 54.33976°N 2.25935°W		Late 17th or early 18th century	The house is in stone, with a stone slate roof, two storeys, two bays and a later rear extension. The gabled porch projects in the centre, and it contains a doorway and a pigeoncote in the gable. To its left is a fixed fire window, and the other windows are sashes. Over the ground floor is a continuous hood mould.
Long Shaw; 54.31184°N 2.17096°W		Late 17th to early 18th century	The house and attached barn, later converted for residential use, are in stone on a plinth, with quoins, projecting through-stones, and a stone slate roof. There are two storeys and a double depth plan, the house has two bays and the former barn has one. On the front is a projecting porch, a fire window, and one- and two-light windows, and in the barn is an arched cart entrance converted into a window.
Old Hall and Old Hall Cottage; 54.31676°N 2.20609°W		Late 17th to early 18th century	A house and two cottages converted into two dwellings, they are in stone, with quoins and a stone slate roof. There are two storeys and attics and three bays. On the front is a tower porch containing a segmental arched doorway. Most of the windows have double-chamfered surrounds, and there are remains of mullions.
Old House, Fossdale; 54.32905°N 2.21624°W	—	Late 17th to early 18th century	The house, which was later extended, is in stone with a stone slate roof. There are two storeys, the original part has two bays, and the extension to the left has one. In the original part is a doorway and chamfered mullioned windows, the ground floor openings with hood moulds. The added bay has sash windows with hood moulds.
Bridge over Cotterdale Beck; 54.33954°N 2.26054°W		Mid 18th century	The bridge carries a road over the stream. It is in stone and consists of a single arch of voussoirs with a hood mould. The parapet has segmental coping.
Lunds Church; 54.34624°N 2.31872°W		Mid 18th century	The redundant church is rendered, and has a stone slate roof. There is a single storey and three bays. On the front is a doorway and a round-arched casement window. In the right return is a round-arched fixed window, and on the left gable is a bellcote.
Cams House and railings 54.30975°N 2.13640°W		Mid to late 18th century	A house and cottage, later combined, in stone, with a stone slate roof, stone coping and shaped kneelers. There are two storeys, and the house has four bays. On the front are two doorways with fanlights, most of the windows are sashes, and all the openings have thin slab lintels under segmental relieving arches. Over the ground floor openings is a hood mould, stepped up over the doorways. The cottage to the right projects, and contains quoins, a doorway and sash windows. In front of the house are wrought iron railings with urn finials, and square stone gate piers.
How Beck Bridge; 54.35585°N 2.33110°W		Mid to late 18th century	The bridge carries a track over the River Ure. It is in stone, it consists of a single segmental arch of voussoirs, and the parapets have slab coping.
Rigg House; 54.32220°N 2.23855°W		Mid to late 18th century	The house is in stone with a stone slate roof. There are two storeys and five bays, the middle three bays projecting as a segmental bow. The outer bays contain doorways and the windows are sashes, those in the middle three bays of the upper floor with ogee heads. In the left return is a tall stair window.
Milestone, Long Shaw; 54.31087°N 2.15756°W		Late 18th century	The milestone on the north side of Long Shaw is in sandstone, and about 600 millimetres (24 in) high. It is cylindrical on a square base, and has a weathered round top. On the sides are inscribed initials and numbers.
Rigg House West; 54.32226°N 2.23879°W		Late 18th century	The house is in stone, with a coped parapet, and a hipped stone slate roof. There are two storeys and two bays. In the front is a doorway with a fanlight and sash windows. On the west front is a bowed projection under a sloping roof containing casement windows.
Bridge over Hearne Beck; 54.32932°N 2.21626°W	—	Late 18th or early 19th century	The bridge carries a track over the stream. It is in stone and consists of a single segmental arch of voussoirs. The parapet has segmental coping.
Hell Gill Bridge; 54.36695°N 2.33027°W		Late 18th or early 19th century	The bridge carries a track over Hell Beck. It is in stone, and consists of a single segmental arch of voussoirs with a partial hood mould. The parapets have slab coping.
Old School; 54.31631°N 2.20664°W		1875	The school and the schoolmaster's house to the left are in stone with a Westmorland slate roof. The house has two bays, the right bay gabled with a bargeboard, oversailing eaves, and two storeys and the left bay has a single storey. In the left bay is a doorway, the right bay contains mullioned and transomed windows, and the left return is hung with Welsh slates. The school has a single storey and four bays, the right bay gabled, and containing two cross windows, above which is a dated quatrefoil. The other windows are mullioned, and between the school and the house is an open porch with a Tuscan column on the corner.
Milestone near Hardraw; 54.31501°N 2.20987°W		Late 19th century	The milepost on the south side of Bellow Hill is in cast iron, and has a triangular plan and a sloping top. Inscribed on the top is "ASKRIGG H D", on each side is a pointing hand, on the left side is the distance to Sedbergh, and on the right side to Askrigg.
Milestone near Sedbusk; 54.31307°N 2.18028°W		Late 19th century	The milepost on Long Shaw is in cast iron, and has a triangular plan and a sloping top. Inscribed on the top is "ASKRIGG H D", on each side is a pointing hand, on the left side is the distance to Sedbergh, and on the right side to Askrigg.
St Mary and St John's Church, Hardraw; 54.31689°N 2.20540°W		1879–81	The church, designed by R. H. Carpenter in a combination of styles, is in sandstone with a Westmorland slate roof. It consists of a nave, a south porch, and a chancel with a north vestry. On the west gable is a two-light bellcote.
Bridge over Hardraw Beck; 54.31641°N 2.20550°W		c. 1889	The bridge carries a road, Bellow Hill, over the stream. It is in stone and consists of a single segmental arch of voussoirs. The bridge has a band and a parapet with slab coping. In the west abutment are three rectangular openings for floodwater.
Stone House; 54.31395°N 2.18634°W		1911	The house, designed by P. Morley Horder, is in stone with quoins and a stone slate roof. There are two storeys and five bays, the left bay being an enclosed loggia. The second and fifth bays project under coped gables. In the fourth bay is a round-arched doorway with a keystone and a hood mould. The windows are mullioned or mullioned and transomed, most with hood moulds..
