= Hardraw =

Hamlet in North Yorkshire, England

Coordinates: 54.31632°N 2.20601°W

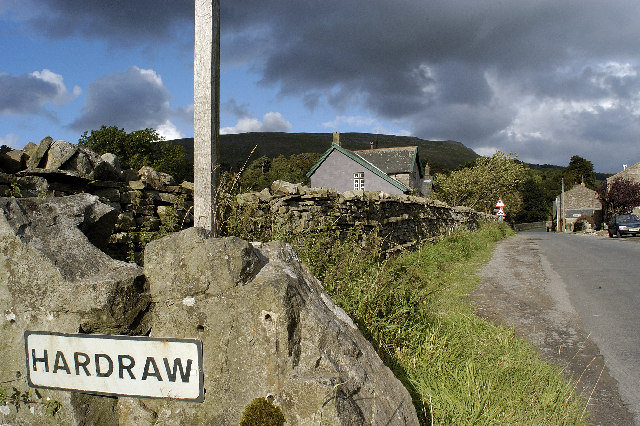
- Hardraw

- Location within North Yorkshire
- OS grid reference: SD866912
- Civil parish: High Abbotside
- Unitary authority: North Yorkshire
- Ceremonial county: North Yorkshire
- Region: Yorkshire and the Humber
- Country: England
- Sovereign state: United Kingdom
- Police: North Yorkshire
- Fire: North Yorkshire
- Ambulance: Yorkshire

Hardraw is a hamlet near Hawes within the Yorkshire Dales in North Yorkshire, England. The nearby Hardraw Force waterfall takes its name from it.

The name of the hamlet is first recorded in 1606 as Hardrawe, and derives from Old English Herde and raw, which means the shepherd's houses. Hardraw Force is named with an additional Old Norse word of Fors. The hamlet was historically in the Parish of Aysgarth, within the wapentake of Hang West. A report about Poor Law Unions from 1862, lists the hamlet as having a population of 11, and belonging to Bedale for its post town. From 1974 to 2023 it was part of the district of Richmondshire. It is now administered by the unitary North Yorkshire Council.

Access to Hardraw Force is via The Green Dragon pub. The old school house, built in 1875, can be seen in the centre of the photograph of the village, and the Pennine Way runs past the west side of this building.

Hardraw Church, dedicated in honour of St Mary and St John, was rebuilt by the Earl of Wharncliffe between 1879 and 1881. It is Grade II listed. It doubles as Darrowby Church in the original British television series All Creatures Great and Small.

The southern end of the road that leads up to the Buttertubs Pass is at the east end of the hamlet. The long distance path, the Pennine Way, passes through the hamlet.

== See also ==
- Listed buildings in High Abbotside

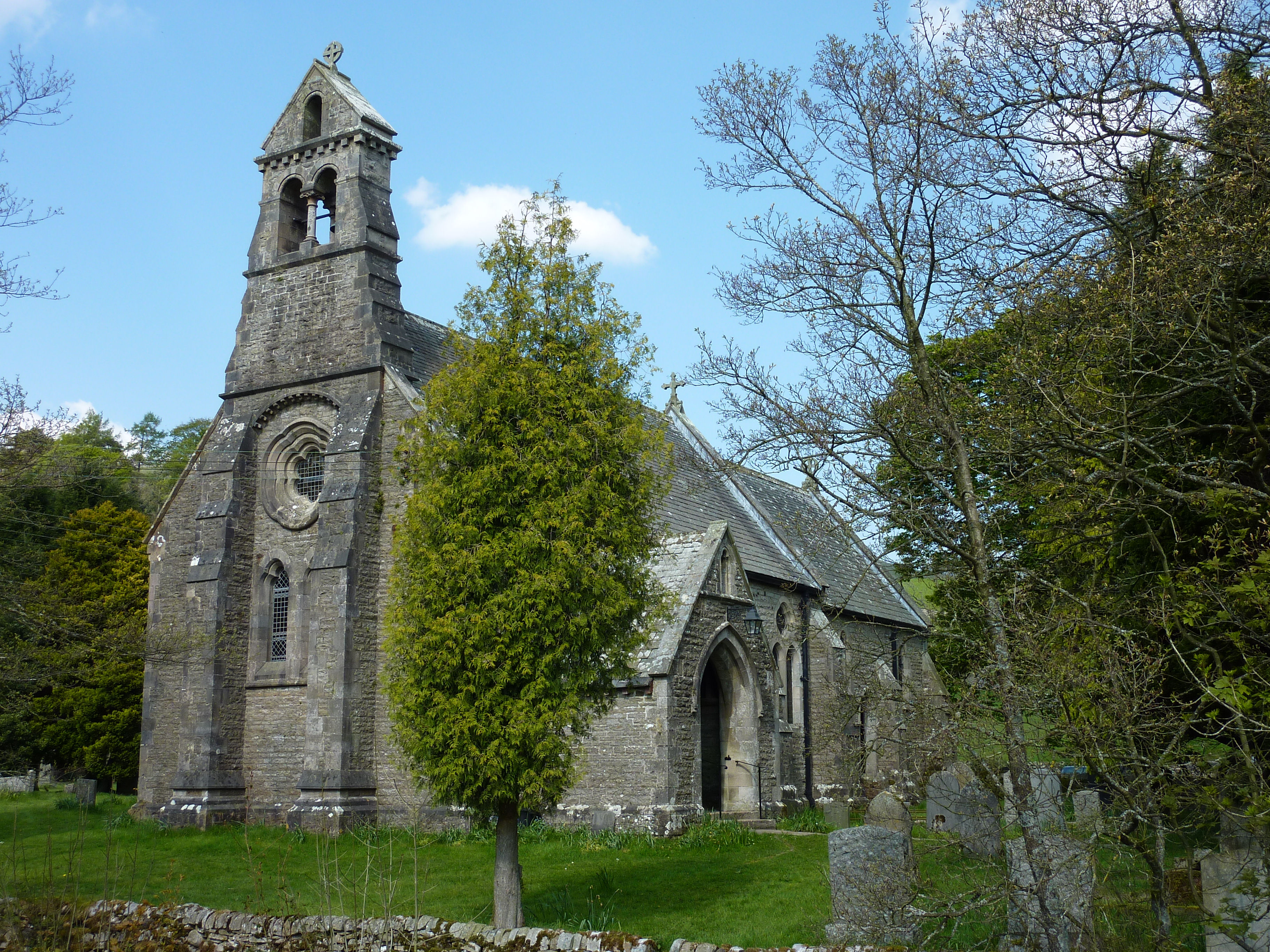
Church of St Mary & St John in Hardraw

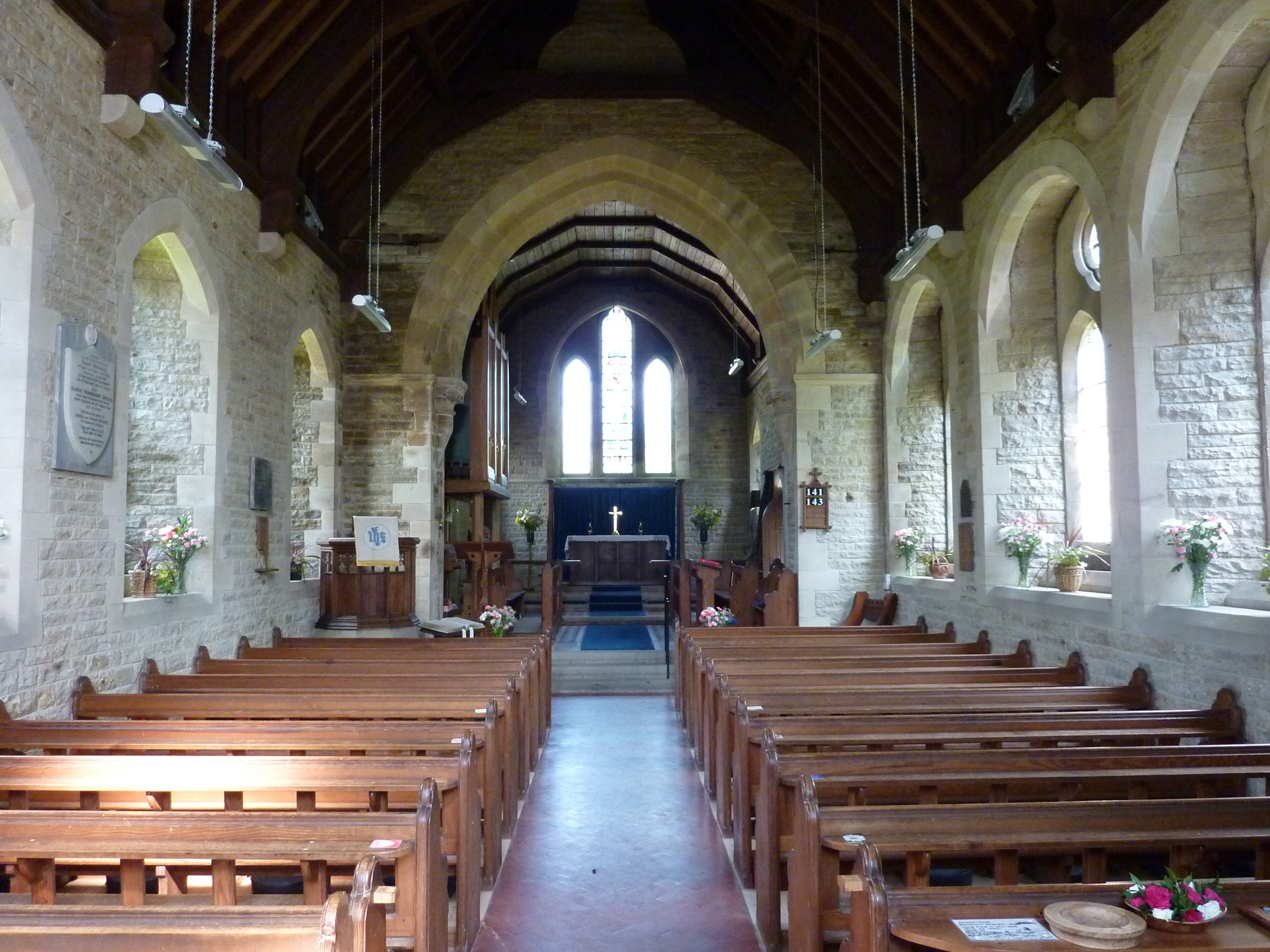
Interior of church of St Mary & St John
