= Silvergate =

Silvergate may refer to:

- Silvergate Bank, a bank focused on cryptocurrency clients
- Silvergate Media, a television production and brand licensing company
- Silvergate, Norfolk, a location in England

== See also ==
- Silver Gate (disambiguation)
