= Lunds Fell =

Hill in the Yorkshire Dales, England

- Sails; Ure Head
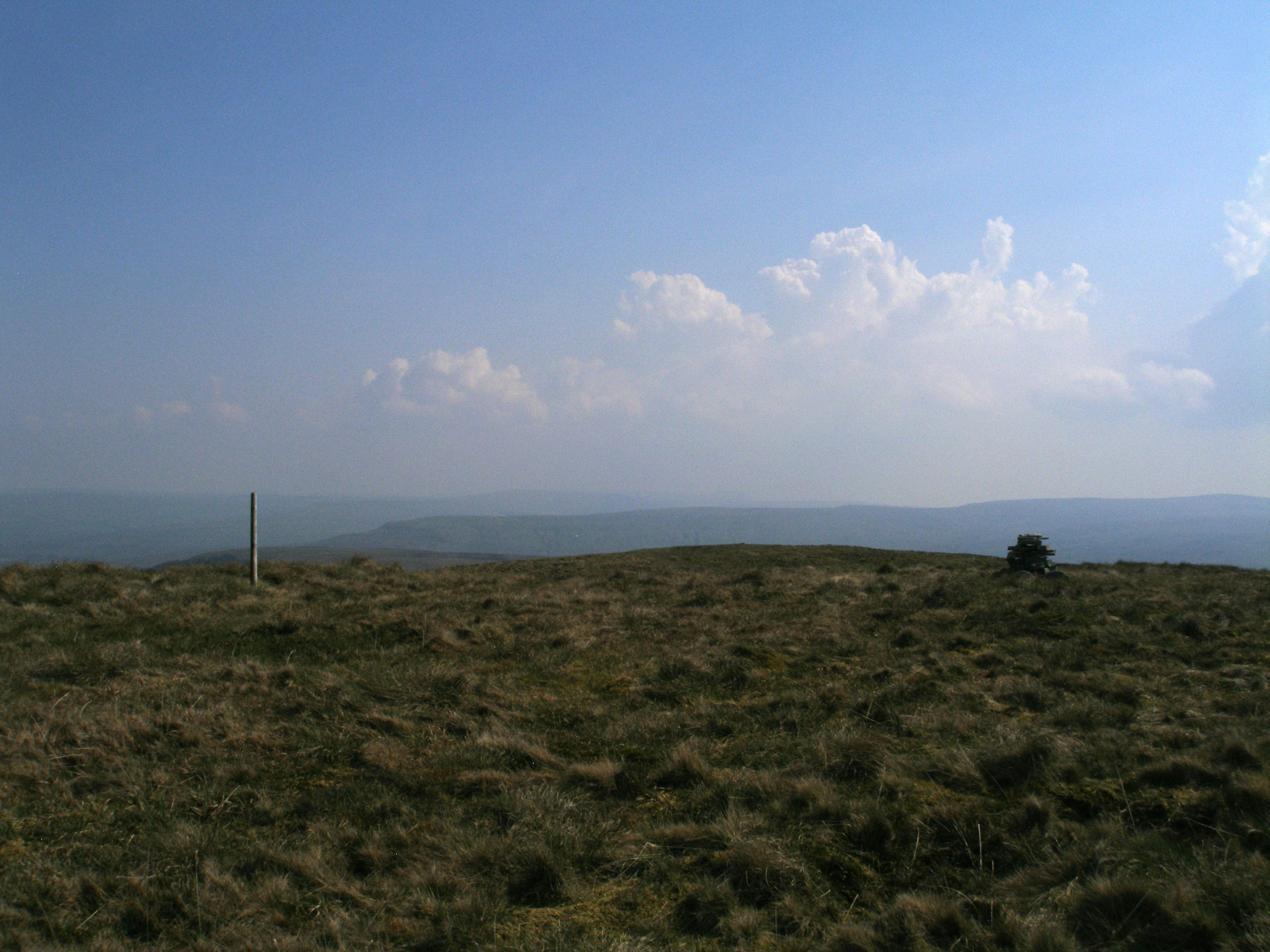
- Summit of Lunds Fell

Highest point
- Elevation: 666 m (2,185 ft)
- Coordinates: 54°21′50″N 2°17′46″W

Geography
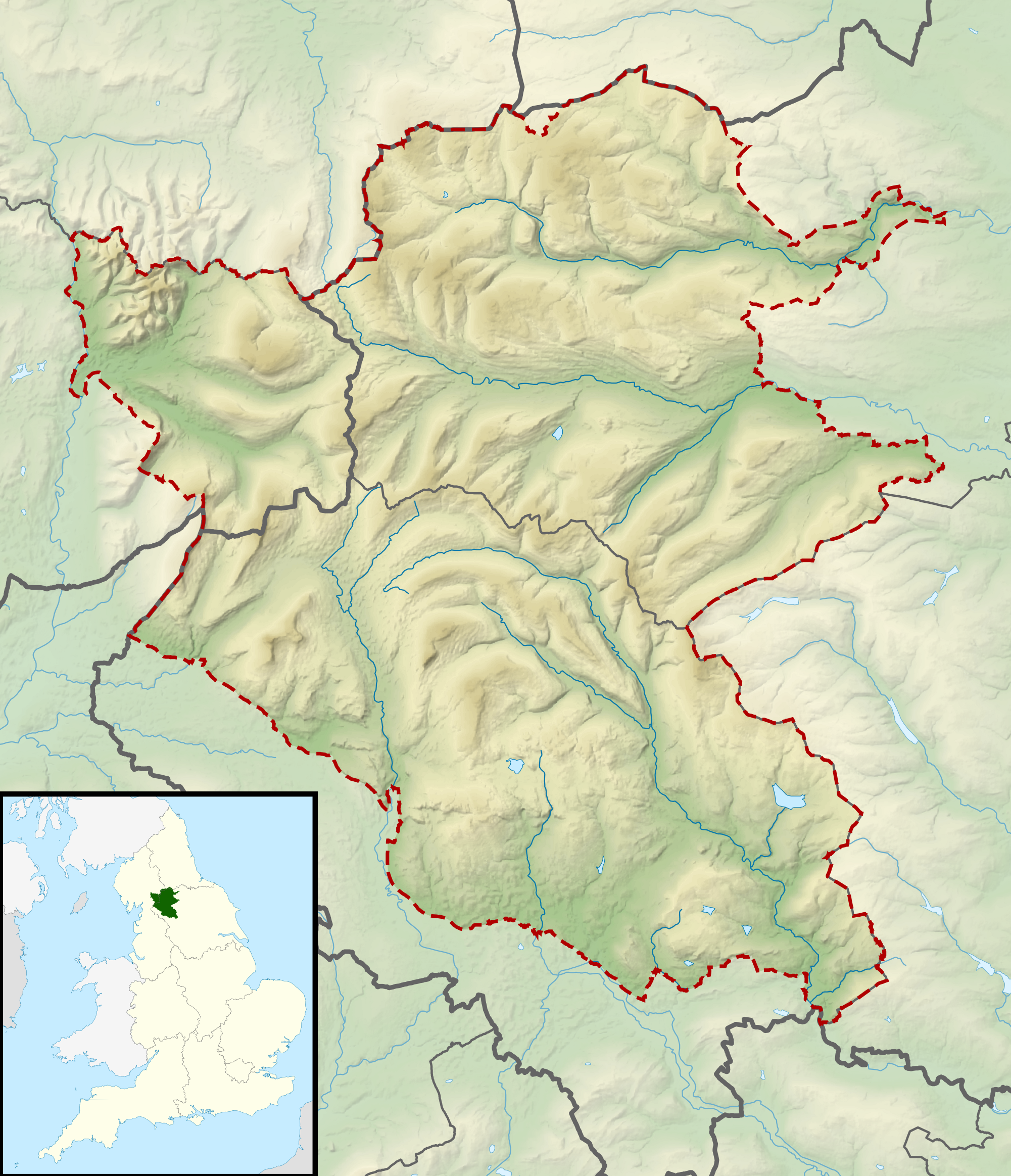
- Location within Yorkshire Dales
- Location: Wensleydale, North Yorkshire
- Country: England
- Parent range: Pennines
- OS grid: SD809971
- Topo map: OS Landranger 98, Explorer OL19

Lunds Fell, also known as Sails (the name of its summit), is a hill in the Yorkshire Dales National Park, in North Yorkshire, England. Lunds Fell is located 5 miles (8 km) north-west of Hawes and straddles the divide between the Ure Valley to the south and the Eden Valley to the north. Its summit is 666 metres (2,185 ft), and Hugh Seat, to the north is 689 metres (2,260 ft) with the county line between Cumbria and North Yorkshire running between the two peaks.

== History ==
The River Ure rises near to the summit of Lunds Fell and other streams on the flanks of the hill feed the River Swale and the River Eden. Lunds Fell is recognised as the most westerly point of Wensleydale, being 5 miles (8 km) north-west of Hawes. The water falling north-westwards off Lunds Fell goes into through the Mallerstang pass as the River Eden into the Irish Sea, but the Ure flows south-eastwards into the North Sea. The main tributary of the Eden, Hell Gill, rises on Hugh Seat, which is just to the north of Lunds Fell, and between the two peaks is the diving line between the counties of Cumbria and North Yorkshire. The name of Lunds fell, like the hamlet of Lunds, derives from the Old Norse lundr meaning wood. At the time of the Viking settlements, the area around Cotterdale and Lunds Fell was afforested, though most likely with birk, rowan, oak and ash trees.

The western side of Lunds Fell consists of black shale, chert, limestone, gannister and sandstone. The earth covering the fell was known to have been a good peat to cut for fuel, and peat-cutting continued here into the 1930s, even after good-quality coal was available through delivery by road. One of the old abandoned farmhouses on the western side of the fell near the hamlet of Lunds was opened as a youth hostel in 1949. It was the highest in Yorkshire at 380 metres (1,250 ft), and possibly, the highest in England. Some of the slopes of Lunds fell were afforested in the 1970s.

Historically, the summit and hill were known by the name Sails, or Sayls. The summit stands at 666 metres (2,185 ft) above sea level according to Ordnance Survey mapping, but in the 19th century, the summit was listed as 670 metres (2,190 ft). (Note: Speight states the height to be 2,186 feet (666 m).) Although Sails is the name of the summit, and it has a trig point located there; the highest point on Lunds Fell is actually Little Fell Brae, which rises to 667 metres (2,188 ft) above sea level. The area was in the wapentake of Hang West under the Parish of Aysgarth from 1100 onwards, but by the 1700s, Hardraw and Lunds were in their own parish. Today, Lunds Fell is in North Yorkshire, and part of the parish of High Abbotside.

The western side of the fell is known for its pass through Mallerstang and now hosts some rambling or walking routes, such as the Pennine Journey. Lady Anne Clifford's path through to Pendragon Castle in the 1640s would have skirted the lower slopes of Lunds Fell; this walk is now commemorated as part of Lady Anne's Way. Also to the west is the B6259 road and the Settle-Carlisle Railway.

== See also ==
- List of peaks in the Yorkshire Dales
