= Simonstone =

Simonstone may refer to two places in England:

- Simonstone, Lancashire
- Simonstone, North Yorkshire
