= Kolvereid Church =

Church in Trøndelag, Norway

- Kolvereid kirke
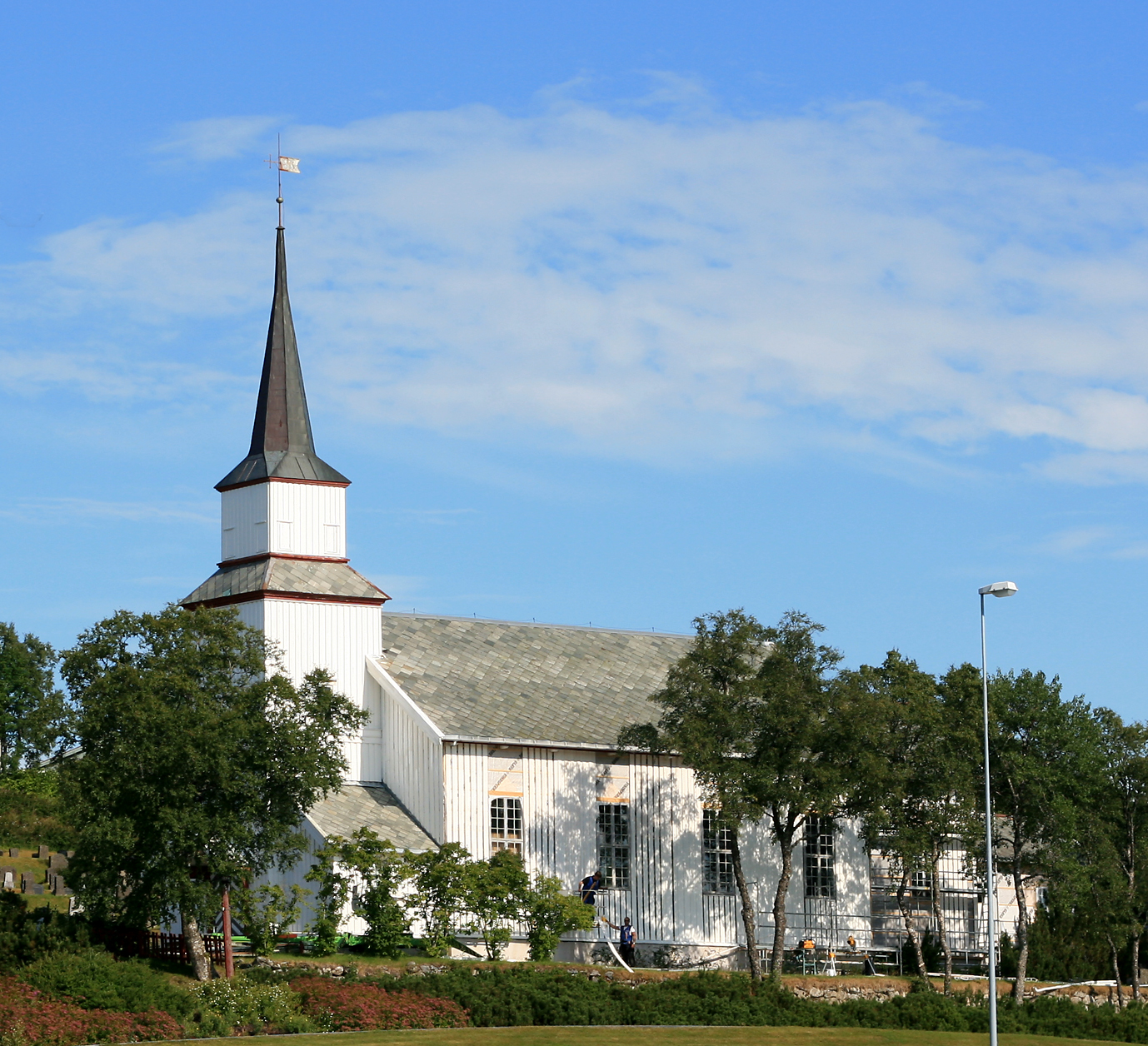
- View of the church
- Kolvereid Church
- 64.86643536°N 11.59646791°E
- Location: Nærøysund Municipality, Trøndelag
- Country: Norway
- Denomination: Church of Norway
- Churchmanship: Evangelical Lutheran

History
- Status: Parish church
- Founded: 15th century
- Consecrated: 1874

Architecture
- Functional status: Active
- Architect: Jacob Wilhelm Nordan
- Architectural type: Long church
- Completed: 1874 (152 years ago)

Specifications
- Capacity: 350
- Materials: Wood

Administration
- Diocese: Nidaros bispedømme
- Deanery: Namdal prosti
- Parish: Nærøy
- Norwegian Cultural Heritage Site
- Type: Church
- Status: Not protected
- ID: 84807

Kolvereid Church (Norwegian: Kolvereid kirke) is a parish church of the Church of Norway in Nærøysund Municipality in Trøndelag county, Norway. It is located in the town of Kolvereid. It is one of the churches of the Nærøy parish which is part of the Namdal prosti (deanery) in the Diocese of Nidaros. The white, wooden church was built in a long church style in 1874 using plans drawn up by the architect Jacob Wilhelm Nordan. The church seats about 350 people.

== History ==
The earliest existing historical records of the church date back to the year 1597, but the church was not new that year. The first church at Kolvereid was a small chapel that was likely built during the 15th century. Records show that in the late 1500s, the chapel typically had two worship services each year. The original church was located about 85 metres (279 ft) west of the present church site. In 1656 the little old chapel was torn down and a new wooden long church was built on the same site. This new wooden church was consecrated in 1658. In 1811, the old church was heavily renovated and expanded, nearly doubling the size of the church. In 1874, a new church building was constructed about 85 metres (279 ft) to the east of the old church, just across the road. After the new church was put into use, the old church was taken down and moved to Bogen where it became known as Opløyfjorden Chapel (and later it was taken down again and moved to Lund where it is known as Lund Chapel).

== See also ==
- List of churches in Nidaros
