= Yoredale Series =

Geological series and strata in the North of England

The Yoredale Series is a now-obsolete geology term for a local phase of Carboniferous rocks in northern England, ranging in age from the Asbian Substage to the Yeadonian Substage. The term Yoredale Group is nowadays applied to the same broad suite of rocks. The name was introduced by J. Phillips on account of the typical development of the phase in Yoredale (now generally known as Wensleydale), Yorkshire.

== Properties and condition ==
In the Yorkshire Dales the Carboniferous rocks assume an aspect very different from that which obtains in the South. Beds of detrital sediment, sandstones, shales and occasional ironstones and thin coals separate the limestones into well-defined beds. These limestone beds have received various names of local significance (Hardraw Scar, Simonstone, Middle, Underset, Main and many others), and owing to the country being little disturbed by faulting and being much cut up by the streams, they stand out as escarpments on either side of the valleys. The first indication of the intercalation of thick detrital deposits within the massive limestone is seen in Ingleborough and Penyghent; but as the rocks are traced north the detrital matter increases in quantity and the limestones diminish, until in Northumberland the whole Carboniferous series assumes the Yoredale phase, and consists of alternations of detrital and calcareous beds, no massive limestone being seen.

== Fossils ==
The Yoredale limestones are characterized by the presence of Productus giganteus and the brachiopod fauna usually associated with it. The main limestone of Weardale is full of corals, including Lonsdaleia floriformis, Dibunophyllum sp., Cyclophyllum pachyendothecum, etc., and has a typical Visean fauna; it would therefore correspond, palaeontologically, with the upper part of the Carboniferous Limestone of Derbyshire.

On Ingleborough the limestone is not very fossiliferous, but the Main Limestone contains small corals of a zaphrentoid type and an upper Visean fauna. Posidonomya Becheri occurs fairly low down in the series in the Shale above the Hardraw Scar and Gayle limestones, but it is not accompanied by any of the goniatites or other cephalopods and lamellibranchs which characterize the Posidonomya Becheri beds of the Pendleside Series, the faunas of the Yoredale and Pendleside phases being very distinct.

The Red Bed Limestone of Leyburn, the uppermost limestone of the series, is very rich in fish remains, which are identical in many cases with those found in the topmost beds of the massive Carboniferous Limestone at Bolt Edge quarry in Derbyshire. The shales between the limestones are rich in fossils and contain abundant single corals referable to Zaphrentis enniskilleni, Cyclophyllum pachyendothecum, and others; these, though high-zonal forms, occur low down in the Yoredale strata, even in the shale above the Hardraw Scar limestone. In the Derbyshire area and farther north these corals would indicate the uppermost beds of the limestone series of those districts, and their early appearance in the Yoredale area is probably entirely due to conditions of environment.

Attempts have been made to correlate rocks in a number of widely separated areas with the Yoredale strata, but on wholly insufficient grounds. It is clear that the exact relationship which the Yoredale series of the type area bears as a whole to the lower Carboniferous rocks of the Midlands, north and south Wales, etc., on the one hand, and to the Pendleside series on the other, has yet to be established on a firm palaeontological basis.
