= Stone House, Hawes =

Stone House
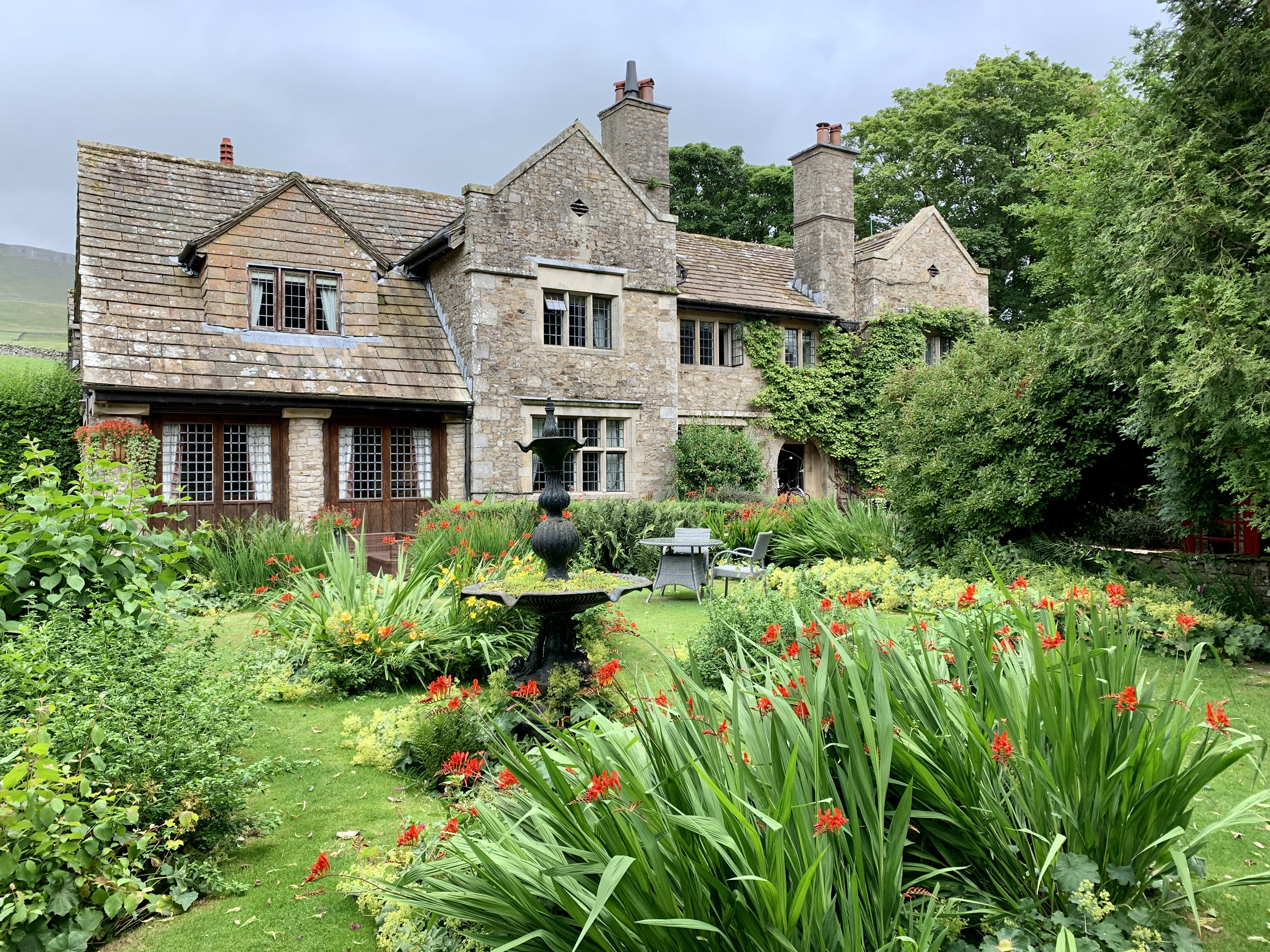
- Interactive map of the Stone House area

General information
- Type: House
- Architectural style: Arts and Crafts
- Location: Hawes, North Yorkshire, England
- Coordinates: 54.3136°N 2.1865°W
- Construction started: 1908
- Opened: 1909
- Client: Hugh Crallen

Design and construction
- Architect: Percy Richard Morley Horder

Website
- stonehousehotel.co.uk

Stone House is a Grade II listed building near Hawes, North Yorkshire, England, in the civil parish of High Abbotside.

== History ==
Stone House was built as a private house for Hugh Arden Crallan (1867–1929). He chose the architect Percy Richard Morley Horder and the house was built in 1909. Crallan was a keen cricketer and set up the Hawes Cricket Club. He employed a gardener at his house, Percy Jeeves, who was a famous bowler and the inspiration for the character Jeeves in the P.G. Wodehouse novels.

Crallan was a keen meteorologist and regularly reported rain fall measurements from Stone House.

After the death of Hugh Crallan in 1929 his widow, Edith continued to live in the house until her death in December 1938.

After a succession of owners, in 1980 the house was sold and in 1981 became a hotel. The building has been expanded since with additional accommodation, but retains much of its historic interior fittings.

== See also ==
- Listed buildings in High Abbotside
