= Listed buildings in Low Abbotside =

Low Abbotside is a civil parish in the county of North Yorkshire, England. It contains seven listed buildings that are recorded in the National Heritage List for England. Of these, one is listed at Grade II*, the middle of the three grades, and the others are at Grade II, the lowest grade. The parish is mainly rural, and does not contain any settlement of significant size. The listed buildings consist of houses, farmhouses and farm buildings, former almshouses, and two milestones.

== Key ==
Grade	Criteria
II*	Particularly important buildings of more than special interest
II	Buildings of national importance and special interest

== Buildings ==
Name and location	Photograph	Date	Notes	Grade
Lukes House; 54.31840°N 2.116274°W	—	Early 17th century	The house is in stone, with a stone slate roof, two storeys and four bays. On the front is a doorway, and to the left is a fixed-light window in a former doorway with a segmental-arched lintel. Most of the other windows are mullioned, and there is a fire window and a casement window.	II
Coleby Hall; 54.31589°N 2.10438°W	—	1655	A manor house in roughcast stone with a stone slate roof. There are two storeys and attics, and an E-shaped plan with five bays, the outer bays projecting and gabled. The middle bay has a projecting gabled tower porch. The porch contains a round-arched doorway with moulded capitals, an ogee-chamfered arris, and a hood mould, and above it is a dated plaque. Inside the porch are stone benches, and the inner doorway is square-headed with a moulded arris. The windows are mullioned and transomed, some with hood moulds.	II*
Milestone near junction with Bainbridge road 54.31372°N 2.10909°W		c. 1761	The milestone on the north side of the road is in sandstone, and about 600 millimetres (24 in) high. It consists of a rounded shaft on a square base, and has a weathered inscription. Near the base of the shaft is a benchmark.	II
Milestone facing junction with Cams road 54.31186°N 2.12997°W		c. 1761	The milestone on the north side of the road is in sandstone, and about 600 millimetres (24 in) high. It consists of a rounded shaft on a square base, and has a weathered inscription of letters and numbers.	II
South View; 54.31427°N 2.09810°W	—	1807	Originally six almshouses, later converted into two cottages, they are in stone, with quoins and a stone slate roof. There is a single story and seven bays. On the front are two doorways with chamfered surrounds and cornices on brackets. The windows are casements with chamfered surrounds and hood moulds.	II
Spen House; 54.31937°N 2.10936°W	—	Early to mid 19th century	The farmhouse and attached outbuildings are in stone with a stone slate roof. There are two storeys, the house has three bays, and the outbuildings have five. The house has a central doorway with moulded imposts and a pediment, and the windows are sashes. The outbuildings contain a coach house with a four-centred arch of voussoirs and a hood mould, and various doorways and windows in the ground floor, and in the upper floor are sash windows.	II
Abbey Cottage; 54.31327°N 2.10080°W	—	Mid 19th century	A house and cottage, later combined, incorporating medieval fragments, with quoins, and a stone slate roof. There are two storeys and six bays. On the front is a gabled porch containing a doorway, above which is a stiff-lead capital, and there are two more doorways to the left. One window is a casement, the others on the front are sashes, and at the rear is a blocked trefoil-headed window with a hood mould.	II
