= River Allen, Cornwall =

River in north Cornwall, England

Coordinates: 50.5091°N 4.8187°W

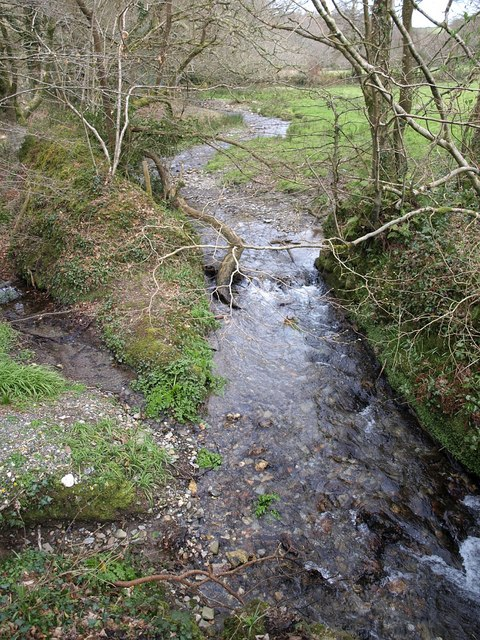
River Allen at Trewen Bridge

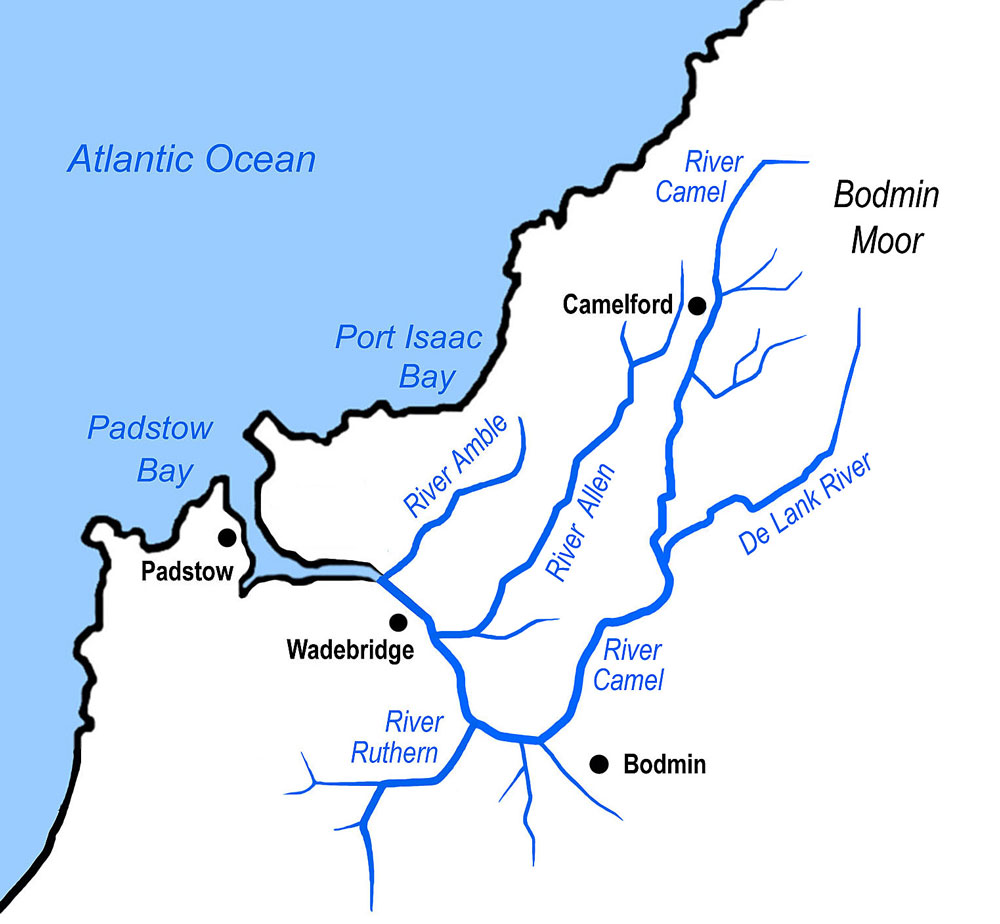
The northernmost River Allen, a tributary of the River Camel

The River Allen (Cornish: Dowr Lehen, meaning slate river) in north Cornwall is one of two rivers in Cornwall which share this name. In this case the name is the result of a mistake made in 1888 by Ordnance Survey, replacing the name Layne with Allen which is the old name for the lower reaches of the Camel. The other River Allen runs through Truro.

The River Allen is a major tributary of the River Camel. It springs northeast of Camelford and flows south-southwest through the Allen Valley passing St Teath and St Kew Highway to join the Camel near Sladesbridge.
