= Atwick =

Village and civil parish in the East Riding of Yorkshire, England

Coordinates: 53.940706°N 0.187689°W

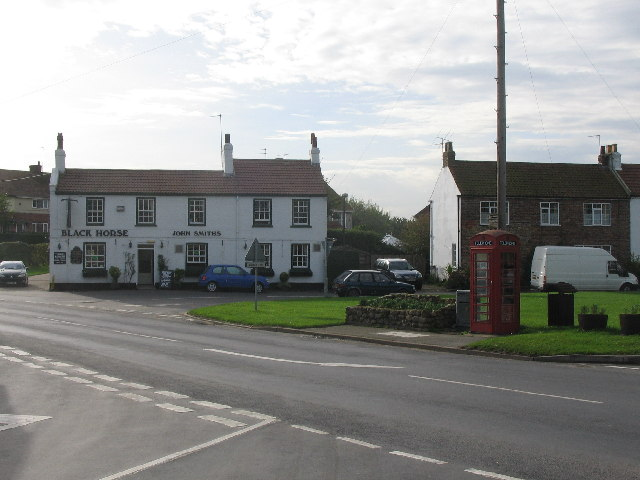
- Atwick village

- Location within the East Riding of Yorkshire
- Population: 315 (2011 census)
- OS grid reference: TA190509
  - London: 170 mi (270 km) S
- Civil parish: Atwick
- Unitary authority: East Riding of Yorkshire
- Ceremonial county: East Riding of Yorkshire
- Region: Yorkshire and the Humber
- Country: England
- Sovereign state: United Kingdom
- Post town: DRIFFIELD
- Postcode district: YO25
- Dialling code: 01964
- Police: Humberside
- Fire: Humberside
- Ambulance: Yorkshire
- UK Parliament: Bridlington and The Wolds

Atwick is a village and civil parish in Holderness in the East Riding of Yorkshire, England. The village is near the North Sea coast, and 2 miles (3.2 km) north of Hornsea on the B1242 road.

The civil parish is formed by the village of Atwick and the hamlet of Skirlington. According to the 2011 UK census, Atwick parish had a population of 315, a slight reduction from the 2001 UK census figure of 318. The parish covers an area of 907.022 hectares (2,241.30 acres).

The name Atwick derives from the Old English attaingwīc meaning 'trading settlement connected with Atta'.

The name Atwick is pronounced with a silent 'w', like "attic".

== Second World War ==
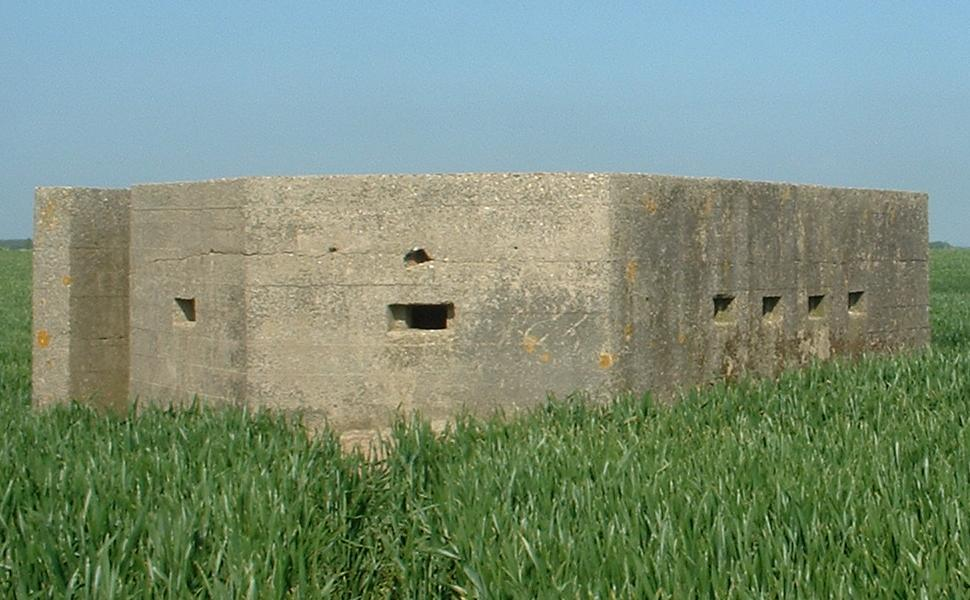
Pillbox, Lozenge shaped, Atwick

The Second World War defences constructed in and around Atwick have been documented by William Foot. They included a heavy anti-aircraft battery and several pillboxes.

== Folklore ==
According to legend, a spring near St Lawrence's Church, Atwick, was once the home of a hobgoblin known as the Haliwell Boggle. The area is also said to be haunted by a headless horseman.

== See also ==
- Listed buildings in Atwick
