= Listed buildings in Atwick =

Atwick is a civil parish in the county of the East Riding of Yorkshire, England. It contains five listed buildings that are recorded in the National Heritage List for England. All the listed buildings are designated at Grade II, the lowest of the three grades, which is applied to "buildings of national importance and special interest". The parish contains the village of Atwick and the surrounding countryside. The listed buildings consist of three houses, a village cross and a telephone kiosk.

== Buildings ==
Name and location	Photograph	Date	Notes
Village Cross; 53.94045°N 0.18778°W		Medieval	The cross is in limestone with large cobbles. It has a base with three steps, on which is a cubical cross base and the fragment of the shaft. The shaft has four sides with panels below, and it is chamfered above.
Arram Hall; 53.92513°N 0.22751°W		Early 17th century	The house is in red brick with diapering in blue-black brick, on a chamfered plinth, with a moulded floor band, a dentilled eaves cornice, and a pantile roof with coped gables and shaped brick kneelers. There are two storeys, attics and cellars, a main block of three bays, and flanking two-storey single-bay wings. On the front is a two-storey porch containing a round-headed doorway with pilasters, imposts, a keystone, and a broken segmental pediment with an urn and finials. Above is a small rectangular window with a hood mould, a dentilled cornice, and a coped gable on shaped kneelers. The outer bays contain full-height canted bay windows. The flanking wings also have shaped gables, and these contain blank quatrefoil panels.
Church Farmhouse; 53.94020°N 0.18997°W	—	Late 18th century	The house is in orange brick, and has a pantile roof with tumbled-in brick to the raised gables. There are two storeys and three bays, and flanking lower two-storey one-bay wings. The central doorway has a rectangular fanlight, and the windows are sashes in architraves. The ground floor openings have wedge lintels.
Grange Farmhouse; 53.94077°N 0.18939°W	—	Late 18th century	The house is in red brick, and has a pantile roof with tumbled-in brick to the raised gables. There are two storeys and three bays. The central doorway has a rectangular fanlight, and the windows are sashes. The ground floor openings have segmental brick arches.
Telephone kiosk 53.94028°N 0.18808°W		1935	The telephone kiosk on the Village Green is of the K6 type designed by Giles Gilbert Scott. Constructed in cast iron with a square plan and a dome, it has three unperforated crowns in the top panels.
