= Silver Gate =

Silver Gate may refer to:

- Silver Gate (Diocletian's Palace), Split, Croatia
- Silver Gate, Montana, US
- Silver Gate (Wyoming), a mountain pass in Wyoming, US

== See also ==
- Silvergate (disambiguation)
