= St Lawrence's Church, Atwick =

Parish church in Atwick, England

Coordinates: 53.9397°N 0.1970°W

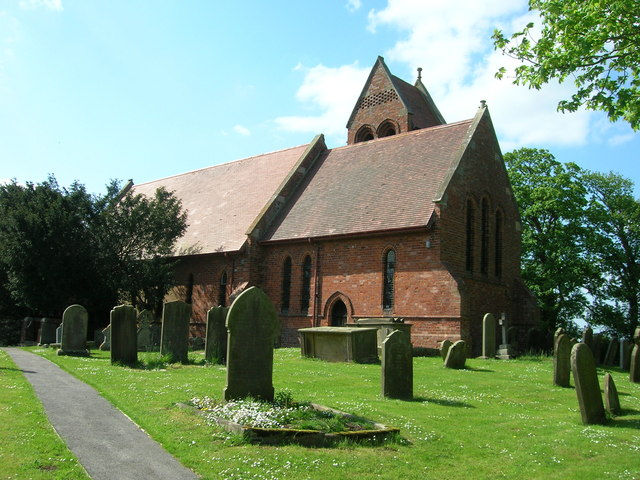
The church, in 2009

Location in the East Riding of Yorkshire

St Lawrence's Church is the parish church of Atwick, a village in the East Riding of Yorkshire, England.

There was a church in Atwick in the mediaeval period, which had a nave, chancel, west tower and south porch. In 1829, the tower was rebuilt in brick. The whole church was demolished in 1876 and replaced by a new building, to a 13th-century Gothic Revival architecture design by Hugh Roumieu Gough.

The church is built of red brick and has a roof of red tiles. It has a chancel, nave, north-east tower, north vestry and south porch. The tower has a saddleback roof. Inside, there is a cylindrical 12th-century baptismal font, and a lectern brought from a church in Kingston upon Hull.
