= Lunde Church =

Lunde Church may refer to:

- Lunde Church (Agder), a church in Sirdal municipality in Agder county, Norway
- Lunde Church (Innlandet), a church in Nordre Land municipality in Innlandet county, Norway
- Lunde Church (Telemark), a church in Nome municipality in Telemark county, Norway

== See also ==
- Lund Church (disambiguation)
