= Hestøy Bridge =

Hestøy Bridge Hestøybrua
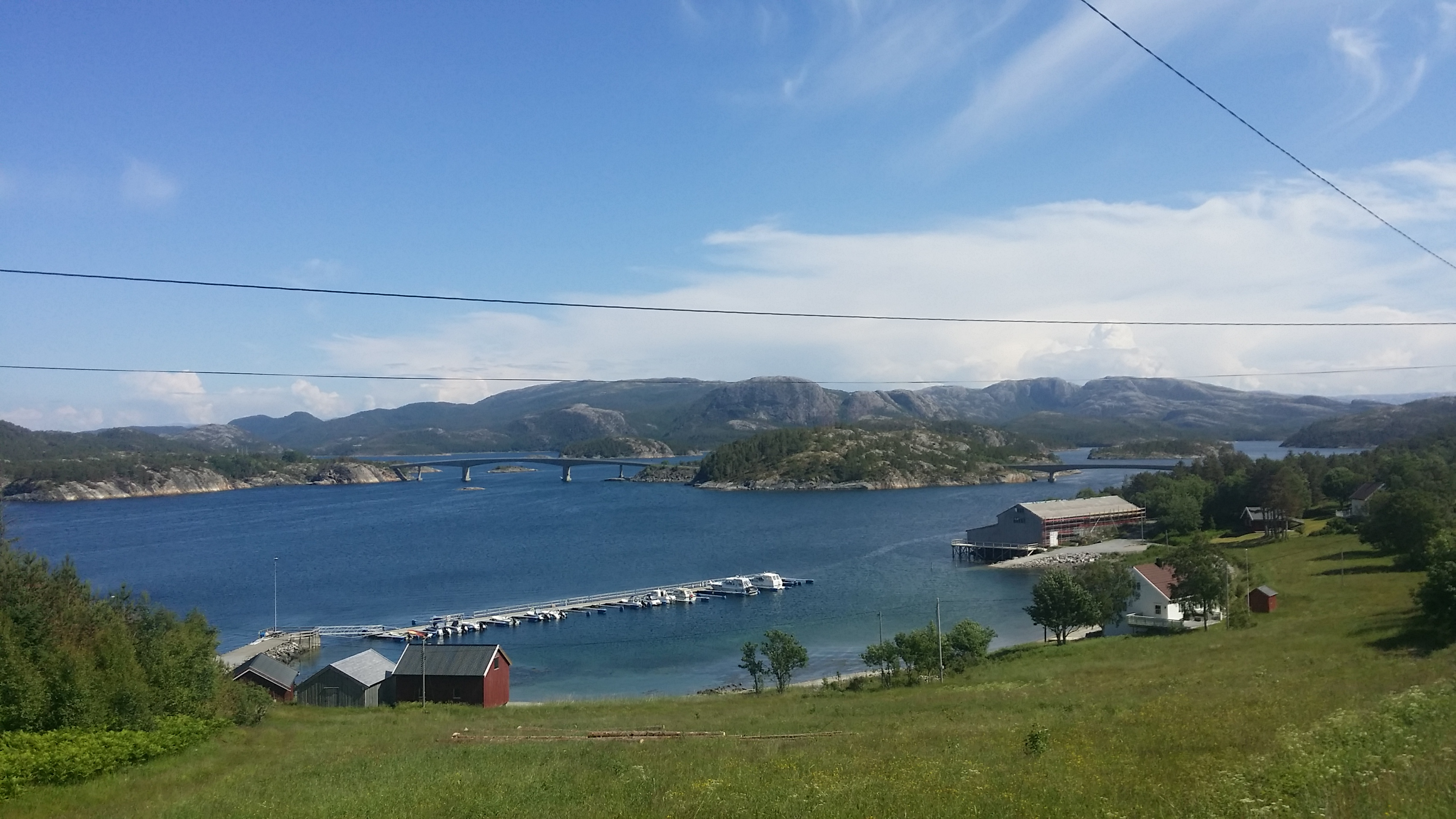
- View of the Hestøy and Smines Bridges
- Coordinates: 64°45′11″N 11°34′23″E
- Carries: Fv769
- Crosses: Fjærangen fjord
- Locale: Namsos Municipality

Characteristics
- Design: Cantilever bridge
- Total length: 256 metres (840 ft)
- Longest span: 100 metres (330 ft)

The Hestøy Bridge (Norwegian: Hestøybrua) is a cantilever bridge in the northeastern part of Namsos Municipality in Trøndelag county, Norway. The bridge is 256 metres (840 ft) long and has a main span of 100 metres (330 ft). The bridge, together with Smines Bridge form a link across the Fjærangen fjord to the village of Lund.

== See also ==
- List of bridges in Norway
- List of bridges in Norway by length
- List of bridges
- List of bridges by length
