= Smines Bridge =

Smines Bridge Sminesbrua
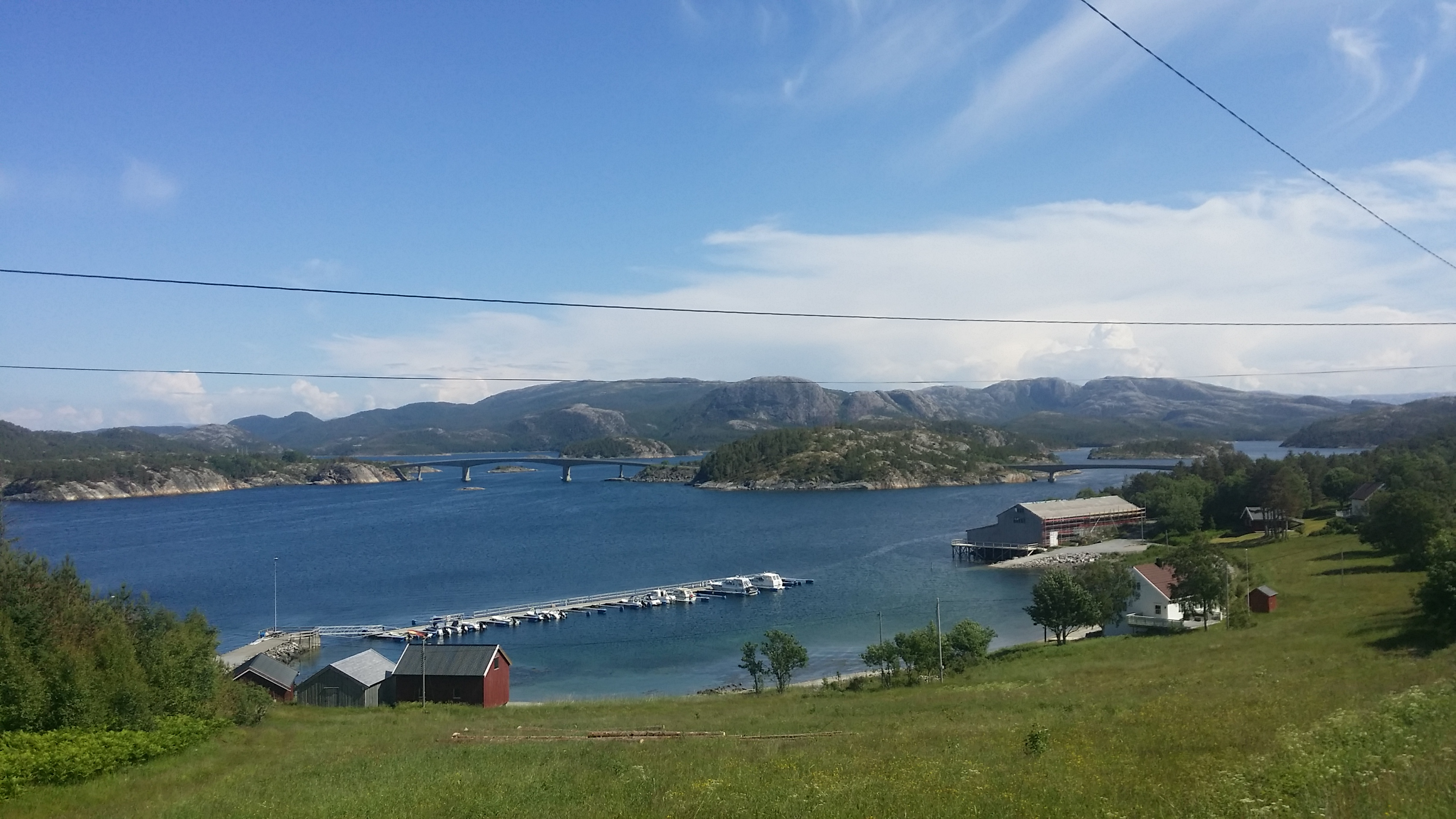
- View of the Smines and Hestøy Bridges
- Coordinates: 64°44′59″N 11°34′03″E
- Carries: Fv769
- Crosses: Fjærangen fjord
- Locale: Namsos Municipality

Characteristics
- Design: Cantilever bridge
- Total length: 152.5 metres (500 ft)
- Longest span: 85 metres (279 ft)

The Smines Bridge (Norwegian: Sminesbrua) is a cantilever bridge in the northern part of Namsos Municipality in Trøndelag county, Norway. The bridge is 152.5 metres (500 ft) long and has a main span of 85 metres (279 ft). Together with the Hestøy Bridge, they form a link over the Fjærangen fjord connecting the village of Lund to the rest of the municipality.

== See also ==
- List of bridges in Norway
- List of bridges in Norway by length
- List of bridges
- List of bridges by length
