= Sedbusk =

Village in North Yorkshire, England

Coordinates: 54.3157°N 2.1794°W

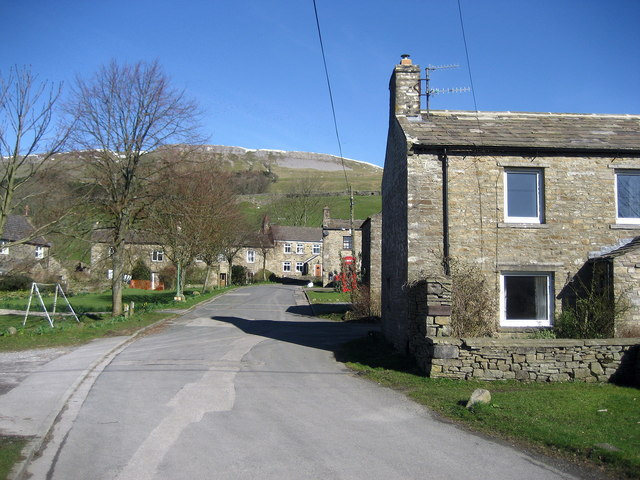
- Sedbusk

- Location within North Yorkshire
- OS grid reference: SD884911
- Civil parish: High Abbotside
- Unitary authority: North Yorkshire
- Ceremonial county: North Yorkshire
- Region: Yorkshire and the Humber
- Country: England
- Sovereign state: United Kingdom
- Police: North Yorkshire
- Fire: North Yorkshire
- Ambulance: Yorkshire

Sedbusk is a hamlet near Hawes and Hardraw Force within the Yorkshire Dales in North Yorkshire, England. The Village is 1 mile (1.5 km) north of the town of Hawes across the River Ure. Sedbusk is in the civil parish of High Abbotside along with Hardraw and Simonstone. The name of the village derives from the Old Norse Saetr buskr, which means 'the bush by the shieling'. In 1280, it was recorded as setebuskste.

From 1974 to 2023 it was part of the district of Richmondshire, it is now administered by the unitary North Yorkshire Council.

Sedbusk is situated just off the "high road" in Wensleydale (the road on the opposite side of the valley to the A684). The road that goes through the Village is part of an old drovers road that is said to have been the route that Mary Queen of Scots travelled along on her way to Castle Bolton.

The Village sits in the shadow of Stags Fell (to the north) which was formerly a centre of quarrying for stone and at one point even had a small colliery, though it is believed to have been only sourcing coal for lime burning. Stone produced at Stag Fell was Yoredale Limestone and whilst production ceased in the 1930s, the tunnels cut into the hillside are still there and are dangerous to enter.

== See also ==
- Listed buildings in High Abbotside
