= Lund, Namsos =

Village in Namsos Municipality, Norway

Lund
- Village
- Interactive map of Lund
- Location within Trøndelag Location within Norway
- Coordinates: 64.7679°N 11.6005°E
- Country: Norway
- Region: Central Norway
- County: Trøndelag
- District: Namdalen
- Municipality: Namsos Municipality
- Elevation: 20 m (66 ft)
- Time zone: UTC+01:00 (CET)
  - Summer (DST): UTC+02:00 (CEST)
- Post Code: 7818 Lund

Lund is a village in Namsos Municipality in Trøndelag county, Norway. The village is located on the south side of the Foldafjord, about 11 kilometres (6.8 mi) south of the town of Kolvereid. Norwegian County Road 769 runs through the village. Lund Chapel is located in the village. The village is connected to the rest of Norway by road by two bridges over the Fjærangen fjord to the south: Hestøy Bridge and Smines Bridge, and it is connected to the neighboring Nærøysund Municipality by a ferry to the north.

Prior to 2020, the village and surrounding area was part of the old Nærøy Municipality.
