= Lund Chapel =

Church in Trøndelag, Norway

- Lund kapell
- Lund Chapel
- 64.7680914°N 11.60981297°E
- Location: Namsos Municipality, Trøndelag
- Country: Norway
- Denomination: Church of Norway
- Churchmanship: Evangelical Lutheran

History
- Status: Parish church
- Founded: 1965
- Consecrated: 1965

Architecture
- Functional status: Active
- Architectural type: Long church
- Completed: 1965 (61 years ago)

Specifications
- Capacity: 105
- Materials: Wood

Administration
- Diocese: Nidaros bispedømme
- Deanery: Namdal prosti
- Parish: Fosnes
- Norwegian Cultural Heritage Site
- Type: Church
- Status: Not protected
- ID: 85228

Lund Chapel (Norwegian: Lund kapell) is a parish church of the Church of Norway in Namsos Municipality in Trøndelag county, Norway. It is located in the village of Lund. It is an annex church for the Fosnes parish which is part of the Namdal prosti (deanery) in the Diocese of Nidaros. The white, wooden church was built in a long church style in 1965. The church seats about 105 people.

== History ==
In 1965, the old Opløyfjorden Chapel was taken down and moved from Østre Bogen to Lund, about 8 kilometres (5.0 mi) to the west, near the mouth of the fjord. The materials (first used in the old Kolvereid Church in 1658 and then reused as Opøyfjorden Chapel in 1874) were then reused again to build the new Lund Chapel to serve the extreme southern part of Nærøy Municipality. In 2020, the municipal borders were changed and this chapel became part of Namsos Municipality and the Fosnes parish.

== See also ==
- List of churches in Nidaros
