= Skelpick =

Coordinates: 58.4731°N 4.19292°W

Skelpick: Scottish Gaelic: Sgeilpeach
- Location within the Sutherland area
- OS grid reference: NC722559
- Council area: Highland
- Lieutenancy area: Sutherland
- Country: Scotland
- Sovereign state: United Kingdom
- Postcode district: KW14 7
- Police: Scotland
- Fire: Scottish
- Ambulance: Scottish

Skelpick (Scottish Gaelic: Sgeilpeach) is a small remote crofting hamlet, 2 miles (3 km) south of Bettyhill, in the far north of Sutherland, Scottish Highlands and is in the Scottish council area of Highland.
