= Slaley, Derbyshire =

Hamlet in Derbyshire, England

Coordinates: 53.1142°N 1.5917°W

Slaley
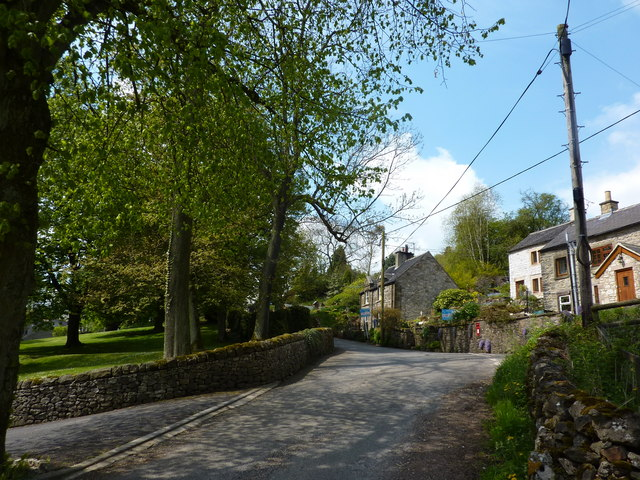
- Slaley

- Location within Derbyshire
- Civil parish: Bonsall
- District: Derbyshire Dales
- Shire county: Derbyshire
- Region: East Midlands
- Country: England
- Sovereign state: United Kingdom
- Post town: MATLOCK
- Postcode district: DE4
- Dialling code: 01629
- Police: Derbyshire
- Fire: Derbyshire
- Ambulance: East Midlands

Slaley is a hamlet in the civil parish of Bonsall, in the Derbyshire Dales district, in the county of Derbyshire, England. The hamlet is located to the south of Bonsall and south-west of Matlock within the boundaries of the Peak District National Park.
