= Sithney Common =

Sithney Common is a hamlet in west Cornwall, England, United Kingdom. It is on the A330 main road between Sithney and Helston.
