= Skirlington =

Hamlet in the East Riding of Yorkshire, England

Coordinates: 53.958553°N 0.201700°W

- Location within the East Riding of Yorkshire
- OS grid reference: TA180528
- Civil parish: Atwick
- Unitary authority: East Riding of Yorkshire
- Ceremonial county: East Riding of Yorkshire
- Region: Yorkshire and the Humber
- Country: England
- Sovereign state: United Kingdom
- Post town: DRIFFIELD
- Postcode district: YO25
- Dialling code: 01262
- Police: Humberside
- Fire: Humberside
- Ambulance: Yorkshire
- UK Parliament: Bridlington and The Wolds

Skirlington is a hamlet in the Holderness area of the East Riding of Yorkshire, England. It is situated approximately 3.5 miles (5.6 km) north of Hornsea on the North Sea coast off the B1242 road.

It forms part of the civil parish of Atwick. The hamlet's name was originally recorded in Old English as Scirleaingaton and was probably derived from the nearby village of Skirlaugh, whose name is a doublet of Shirley.

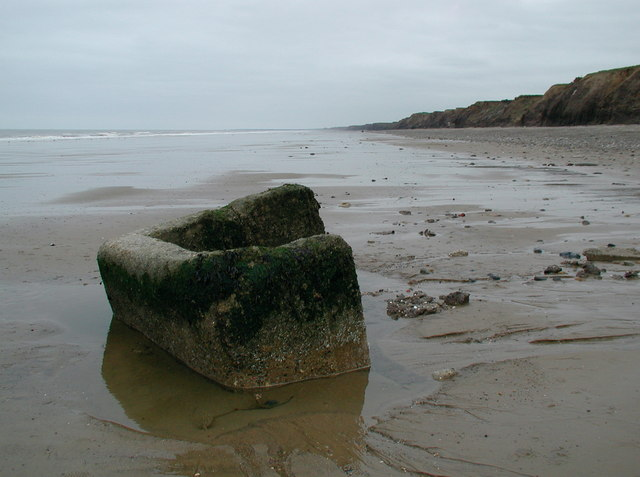
Second World War concrete obstacle at Skirlington Sands

Primarily, Skirlington is a caravan site and leisure park with a popular Sunday market that is open all year and includes Bank Holiday Mondays, with an indoor area and outdoor area for over 300 stalls, it also opens on Wednesdays in July and August. There is car parking for over 2,000 cars.
