= Silverwell =

Hamlet in Cornwall, England

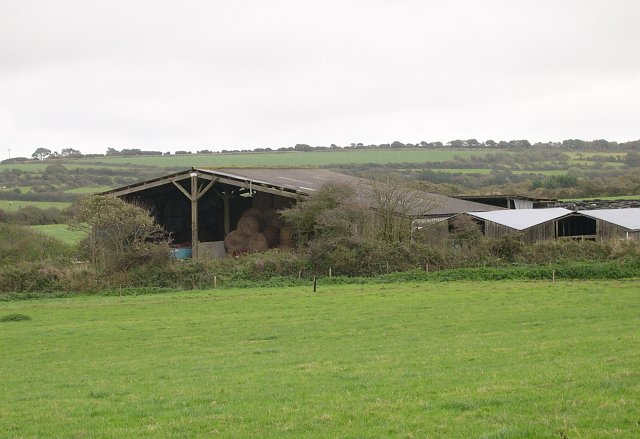
Farm Buildings in pasture land at Silverwell Farm

Silverwell is a hamlet in Cornwall, England, United Kingdom. It is between Three Burrows and Coldharbour and southeast of Goonbell.
