= Skinner's Bottom =

Hamlet in Cornwall, England

Coordinates: 50.2721°N 5.1961°W

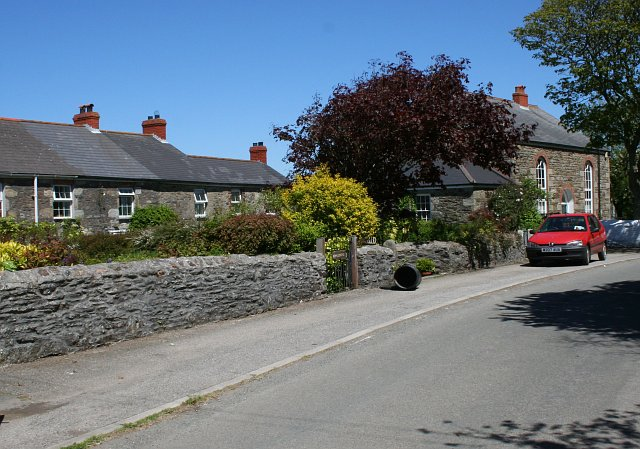
- Skinner's Bottom

- Location within Cornwall
- OS grid reference: SW7246
- Civil parish: St Agnes
- Unitary authority: Cornwall
- Ceremonial county: Cornwall
- Region: South West
- Country: England
- Sovereign state: United Kingdom
- Postcode district: TR16
- Police: Devon and Cornwall
- Fire: Cornwall
- Ambulance: South Western

Skinner's Bottom is a hamlet near Porthtowan in west Cornwall, England, United Kingdom.

== History and antiquities ==
Within the St Agnes area, there were some Iron Age buildings and features were used during the Roman period from 43 to 410 AD. Northwest of Wheal Rose and west of Skinner's Bottom was building, a terraced field system, and an excavation pit. There were also some prehistoric flint arrowheads found at Skinner's Bottom slightly north and west of Spring Cottage.

== Religion ==
Skinner's Bottom had a Wesleyan chapel and a Primitive Methodist chapel.
