= Lunds, North Yorkshire =

Hamlet in North Yorkshire, England

Coordinates: 54.346°N 2.318°W

Lunds
- Hamlet
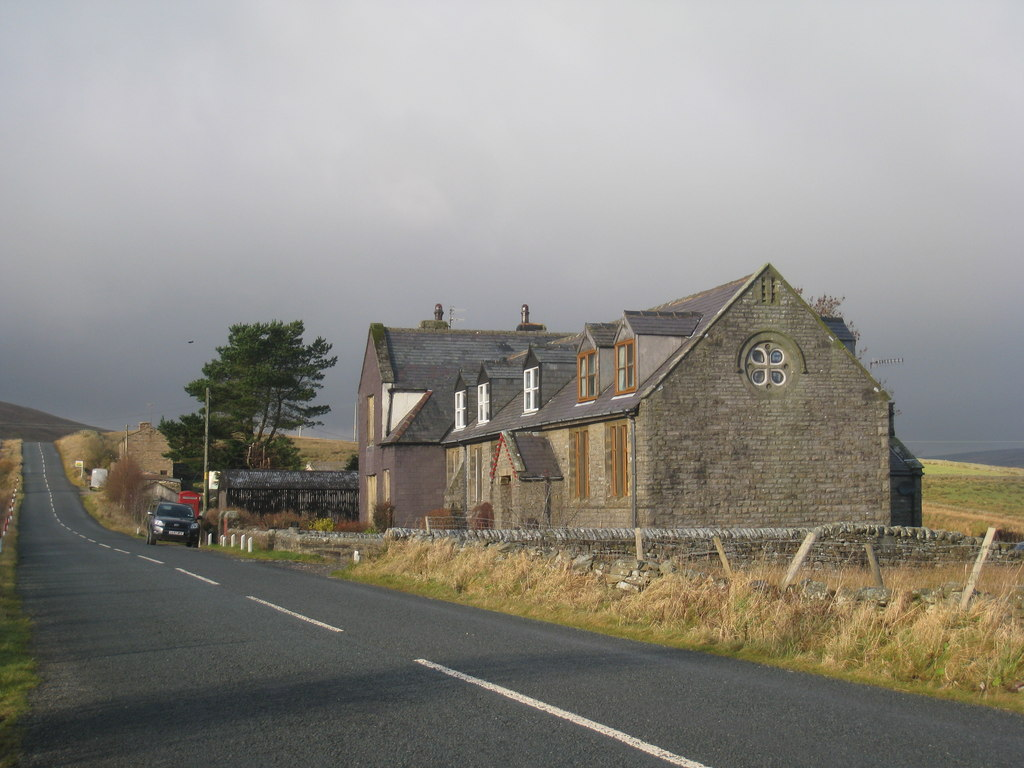
- Houses at Lunds

- Location within North Yorkshire
- OS grid reference: SE793942
- Civil parish: Hawes; High Abbotside
- Unitary authority: North Yorkshire
- Ceremonial county: North Yorkshire
- Region: Yorkshire and the Humber
- Country: England
- Sovereign state: United Kingdom
- Post town: SEDBERGH
- Postcode district: LA10
- Police: North Yorkshire
- Fire: North Yorkshire
- Ambulance: Yorkshire
- UK Parliament: Richmond and Northallerton

Lunds is a hamlet in North Yorkshire, England, near to the watershed of the Eden and Ure rivers. It is on the border between Cumbria and North Yorkshire, and was at one time allocated to the West Riding, but has been traditionally treated as being in the North Riding.

== History ==
Historically the hamlet was in the parish of Aysgarth in the wapentake of Hang West. Sometimes the area was treated as the belonging to the West Riding, but Hang West was always part of the North Riding. The settlement was also referred to as either Holbeck Lundes, or Hellbeck Lunds to distinguish it from South Lunds (near the Moorcock Inn) and Hanging Lunds, further up the valley near Mallerstang. The name translates from the Old Norse Lundr and means the woods, which reflects on the area being heavily wooded during the Viking invasions when the fields were covered with thorn, rowan, ash and oak trees. The hamlet, which is described variously as "scattered" due to the dispersed nature of the farms and dwellings, is adjacent to the B6259 road and is quite close to the Settle–Carlisle line. The nearest station on the line to Lunds is at Garsdale, which is just to the south. The hamlet is 7 miles (11 km) north-west of Hawes, and 10 1/2 miles (16.9 km) from Askrigg. The area is mostly given over to farming, though the land in this part of the upper dale is well above 1,000 feet (300 m), with the chapel at an elevation of 1,100 feet (340 m).

A school was built in 1878 specifically to educate the children of railway families. The school had a capacity of 64, but the attendance in the 1890s was on average only half that, and its schoolmaster was also the local vicar, so it there was an interregnum, the school suffered for the lack of a teacher. The school closed in 1946. The area has a Lancaster postcode, but comes under Sedbergh for its postal town, which is now in Cumbria, but used to be in the West Riding of Yorkshire. The hamlet's location on the border between the two counties of Yorkshire and Cumbria meant that sometimes services were shared out, with the bins being regularly emptied by the South Lakeland Council in the 1980s. An inn was located within the hamlet until March 1975. A month after closure, the landlord and landlady were found dead after a severe fire in the former inn.

Population statistics were normally recorded within the parish that Lunds was in at the time, historically as High Abbotside, which, in 1892, listed Lunds as having a population of 92. In the 21st century, the hamlet straddles the boundary of the parishes of Hawes and High Abbotside, in the Upper Dales electoral division, and is represented at Westminster as part of the Richmond and Northallerton constituency.

The River Ure rises on Lunds Fell to the north-east of Lunds, and passes through the hamlet in a valley floor that is quite wide and level. The river gathers pace once it passes the Moorcock Inn and turns eastwards into Wensleydale proper. The River Eden also rises on the same section of hills, and its headwaters come within metres of the River Ure.

Lunds Church, which measures 14 feet (4.3 m) by 24 feet (7.3 m) was built in sometime in the 18th century, with the register beginning in 1749. The chapel was originally a daughter church to that at Aysgarth, some 16 miles (26 km) to the east, and was renovated in 1894 at a cost of £92 (equivalent to £10,000 in 2025). It possesses a small graveyard, and the dead from nearby Cotterdale, were brought over the hill on the northern edge of the River Ure to Lunds for funerals. The chapel was made redundant in 1981, and grade II listed in 1986. The building was used in the 2011 film adaptation of Wuthering Heights.

The area came under the ecclesiastical Parish of Aysgarth in 1100, but by 1722, Hardraw and Lunds were running as their own distinct parish. The church has fallen into disrepair several times, and an old tale tells of how the church was missing a door, and so a bush was used to place in the doorway to stop cattle finding their way in. One of those buried in the small graveyard is John Blades, who was born in Lunds, but left in 1773 for London with only half a crown in his pocket. He gained his fortune and became the Sheriff of London in 1813.
