= Low Abbotside =

Civil parish in North Yorkshire, England

Coordinates: 54.328°N 2.135°W

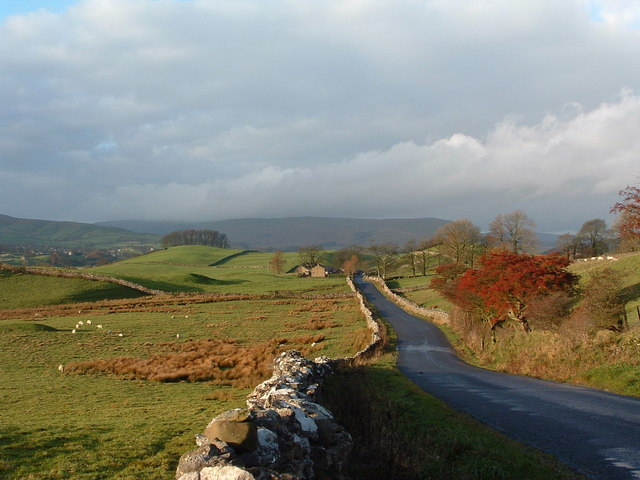

Low Abbotside is a civil parish in the county of North Yorkshire, England. It is a rural parish on the north side of Wensleydale. There is no village in the parish. The population was estimated at 110 in 2012.

== Governance ==
The parish lies within the Richmond and Northallerton UK Parliament constituency. From 1974 to 2023 it was part of the district of Richmondshire, it is now administered by the unitary North Yorkshire Council.

The civil parish shares a grouped parish council with the civil parish of Askrigg, known as Askrigg & Low Abbotside Parish Council.

== History ==
Low Abbotside was historically a township in the large ancient parish of Aysgarth in the North Riding of Yorkshire. The name derives from the land on the north side of Wensleydale held by the abbot of Jervaulx Abbey in the Middle Ages. The first site of the abbey, founded in 1145 as Fors Abbey (named from a waterfall on the Meer Beck) is in the parish, about 1 mile west of Askrigg. The abbey was moved from there to its present site in 1156.

The abbot's manor was formally known as the Manor of Wensleydale, at least from the 14th century, but was also known as Abbotside. After the dissolution the abbot's lands were sold to a succession of owners, and in 1723 were acquired by the Wortley family, who divided Abbotside into the manors of High Abbotside and Low Abbotside.

In 1866 the manor or township of Low Abbotside became a separate civil parish. The parish was enlarged in 1934, when part of Abbotside Common, previously shared with the parish of High Abbotside, was added to the parish.

== See also ==
Listed buildings in Low Abbotside
