= Sladesbridge =

Coordinates: 50°30′29″N 4°48′12″W

Sladesbridge: Cornish: Ponslayn
- Village
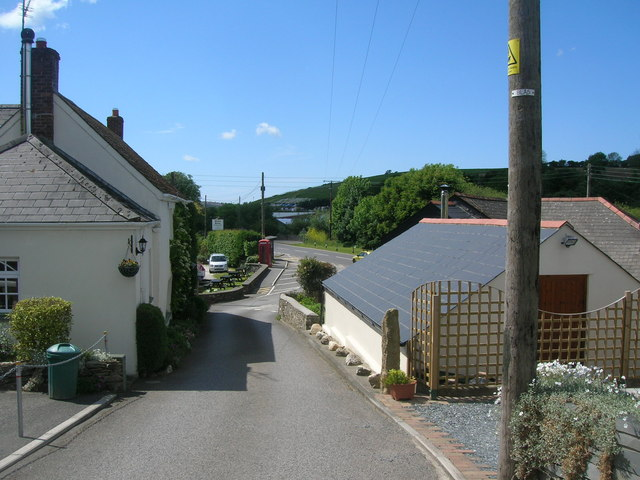

- Location within Cornwall
- Civil parish: Egloshayle
- Unitary authority: Cornwall
- Ceremonial county: Cornwall
- Region: South West
- Country: England
- Sovereign state: United Kingdom
- Post town: WADEBRIDGE
- Postcode district: PL27
- Dialling code: 01208
- Police: Devon and Cornwall
- Fire: Cornwall
- Ambulance: South Western
- UK Parliament: North Cornwall

Sladesbridge (Cornish: Ponslayn) is a village located near Wadebridge in Cornwall, England. It is situated at the confluence of the River Allen and the Croan Stream about 1 km upstream of the confluence with the River Camel. The surrounding area is in the Cornwall Area of Outstanding Natural Beauty and the floodplain is a Special Area of Conservation, a Site of Special Scientific Interest and a County Wildlife Site.

== Economy ==
It has a number of businesses including Slade's House Country Inn, Trelawney Garden Leisure, Knevitt Consulting Engineers, Wood Design Furniture and Kestle Quarry.

== Flora and fauna ==
Otters, salmon, kingfishers, water rail and snipe are often seen in and around the river and the reedbeds either side. A footpath runs along the western edge of the river allowing the general public to view the wildlife.

== Flooding ==
The village flooded very badly in June 1993 when the fire service had to rescue people from their properties. It had flooded to a lesser extent many other times over the years so following the Autumn 2000 floods, defra made additional funding available to enable the Environment Agency to promote a flood defence scheme for the area, including the hamlet of Clapper on the edge of Wadebridge.

The car park of the pub was the site of the opening of the Environment Agency's £1.8million scheme in April 2004 by the outgoing chairman of the South West Regional Flood Defence Committee, Deborah Clark. The scheme itself, designed by Halcrow Group Limited and built by Mowlem Civil Engineering and the Environment Agency's own in-house workforce, was a finalist in the following year's Prime Minister's Better Public Building Awards and was awarded a plaque by the Commission for Architecture and the Built Environment (CABE). It was also a finalist in the British Construction Industry Awards Small Civil Engineering category and made the final three of the BCIA Best Practice Awards at the same time. The scheme was designed to fit into its surroundings with all walls built with slate to look like the local Cornish hedges and a 9 hectare wetland created to allow the rivers to reclaim their floodplain. A new cycle track was created with the view to potentially linking the village with the Camel Trail. Over 4000 native trees and shrubs were planted as well and the completed scheme now protects all the properties and businesses in the village against a flood with a 1.3% chance of occurring in a year.
