= High Abbotside =

Civil parish in North Yorkshire, England

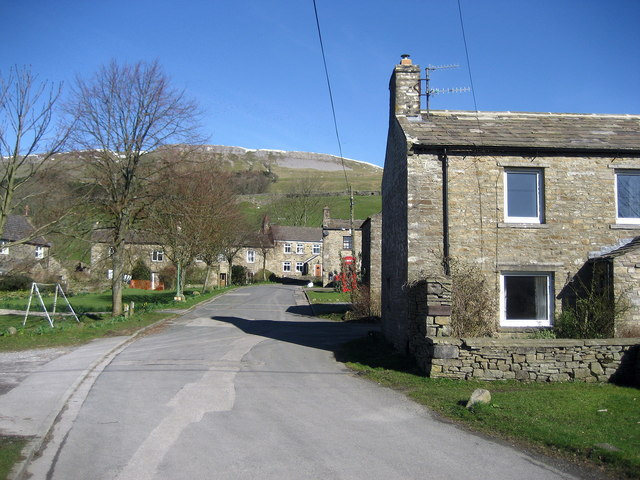
- Sedbusk
- Population: 210 (2011 census)
- Unitary authority: North Yorkshire
- Ceremonial county: North Yorkshire
- Region: Yorkshire and the Humber
- Country: England
- Sovereign state: United Kingdom
- Post town: Hawes
- Postcode district: DL8
- Post town: Sedbergh
- Postcode district: LA10
- Police: North Yorkshire
- Fire: North Yorkshire
- Ambulance: Yorkshire
- UK Parliament: Richmond and Northallerton

High Abbotside is a civil parish in the county of North Yorkshire, England. It is a rural parish on the north side of upper Wensleydale, and includes the settlements of Hardraw, Sedbusk and several hamlets.

== Governance ==
The parish is located within the Richmond and Northallerton constituency. From 1974 to 2023 it was part of the district of Richmondshire, and it is now administered by the unitary North Yorkshire Council.

The civil parish shares a grouped parish council with the civil parish of Hawes, known as Hawes & High Abbotside Parish Council.

== Geography ==
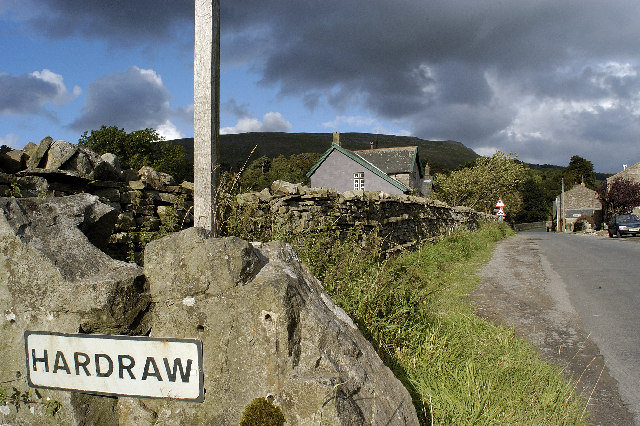
Hardraw

The southern and western parish boundary runs along the River Ure, close to the A684 road, from just west of Bainbridge to White Birks Hill and the border with Westmorland / Cumbria, near the source of the Ure (which is within the parish). The northern boundary runs south-east across the top of both Great Shunner Fell and Abbotside Common. In addition to the main settlements, there are several hamlets such as Blades, Litherskew, Fossdale, Simonstone, Cotterdale, West End, and the Lunds (to the east of the Ure).

The highest point in the parish is Great Shunner Fell, the third highest peak in Yorkshire, at 2,349 feet (716 m). The Pennine Way crosses over the summit. The area has many small gills and becks that feed the main river system. There are extensive amounts of shake holes which are popular with cavers. One of the most notable natural features in the Parish is Hardraw Force, a waterfall with a drop of 100 feet (30 m).

== History ==
High Abbotside was historically a township in the large ancient parish of Aysgarth in the North Riding of Yorkshire. The name derives from the land on the north side of Wensleydale held by the abbot of Jervaulx Abbey in the Middle Ages. The abbot's manor was formally known as the Manor of Wensleydale, at least from the 14th century, but was also known as Abbotside. After the dissolution the abbot's lands were sold to a succession of owners, and in 1723 were acquired by the Wortley family, who divided Abbotside into the manors of High Abbotside and Low Abbotside.

In 1866 the manor or township of High Abbotside became a separate civil parish. The parish was enlarged in 1934, when the greater part of Abbotside Common, previously shared with the parish of Low Abbotside, was added to the parish.

== Demography ==
Population
Year	1881	1891	1901	1911	1921	1931	1951	1961	2001	2011
Total	493	412	381	348	365	330	285	253	207	210

=== 2001 census ===
The 2001 UK census showed that the population was split 46.9% male to 53.1% female. The religious constituency was made of 82.7% Christian and the rest stating no religion or not stating at all. The ethnic make-up was 97.1% White British, 1.4% White Irish and 1.4% White other. There were 133 dwellings.

=== 2011 census ===
The 2011 UK census showed that the population was split 47.6% male to 52.4% female. The religious constituency was made of 74.8% Christian and the rest stating no religion or not stating at all. The ethnic make-up was 96.2% White British, 2.4% each White Other and 1% Black British. There were 152 dwellings.

== Economy ==
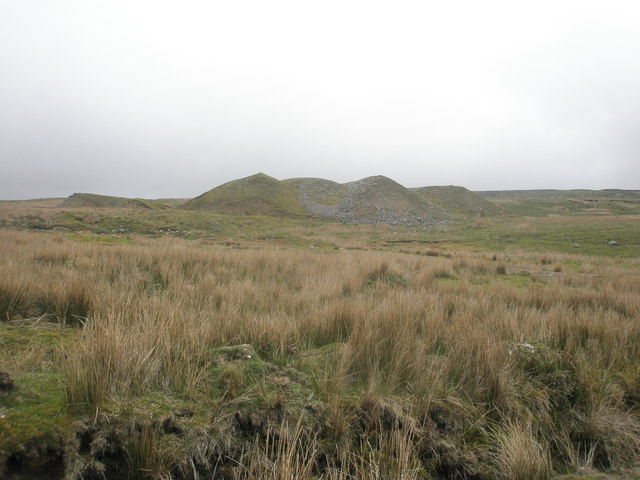
Spoil heaps on Sargill Side from former lead mine

The main occupations in the parish are farming and tourism. In the past the area was known for lead mining and remnants can still be found in the hillsides of the parish. Most notable of this industry is the Sargill Ore Heath Lead Smelt Mill on North Rigg near to the Sargill Lead Mine. This has been designated an Ancient Scheduled Monument.

== Religion ==
The church of St Mary the Virgin and St John in Hardraw was built in 1879–81 in place of an earlier building from the 18th-century date. The registers begin in 1749. Lunds Church is a small disused church situated in the hamlet of Lunds which is a Grade II listed building. There also used to be a Methodist chapel in Sedbusk.

== See also ==
- Listed buildings in High Abbotside
