= Skye Green =

Hamlet in Essex, England

Coordinates: 51.867°N 0.719°E

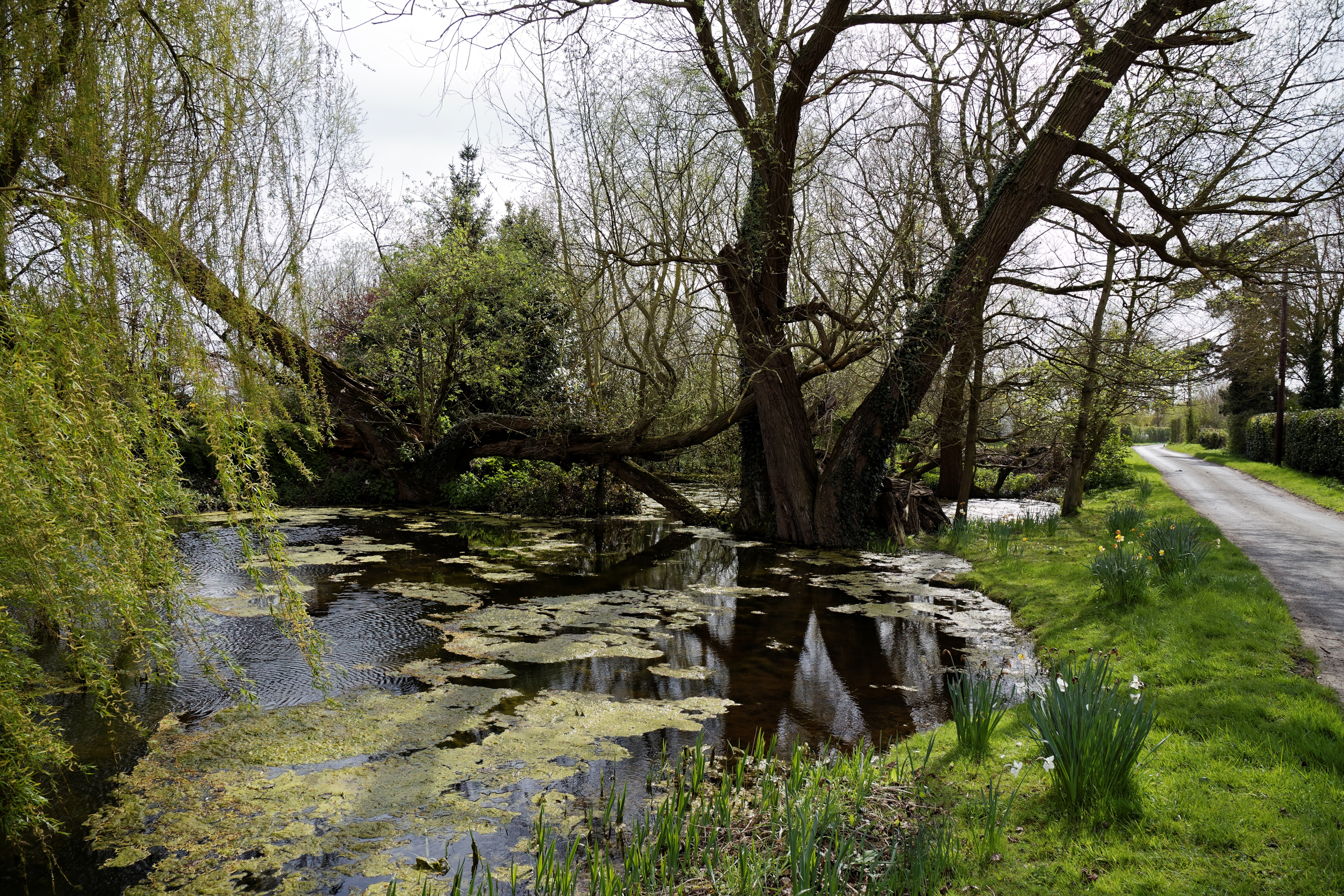
- Pond and lane next to Cockerell's Farmhouse in Skye Green

- Location within Essex
- Civil parish: Feering
- District: Braintree
- Shire county: Essex
- Region: East
- Country: England
- Sovereign state: United Kingdom
- Police: Essex
- Fire: Essex
- Ambulance: East of England

Skye Green is a hamlet at the north the civil parish of Feering, and in the Braintree district of Essex, England. The hamlet is situated between the village of Feering, 1 mile (1.6 kilometres) to the south, and the Coggeshall hamlet of Surrex, 1/2 mile (800 metres) to the north. Nearby settlements include Langley Green, Broad Green and Stocks Green.

Skye Green includes Home Farm, Cockerell's Farm and Shoulder Hall. The hamlet contains two Grade II listed buildings: Cockerell's Farmhouse (c.1700) with Bakehouse (c.1800), and The Old Cottage which dates to the 17th century.
