= Skuse =

Skuse is an English surname.

Variant spellings: Skewes, Skuce, Squce, Scuce, Scruse.

Geographic distribution: Devon (pre 1600), Somerset (pre 1600), Gloucestershire (pre 1700), Wiltshire (pre 1700), Oxfordshire (pre 1800), London (pre 1800), Birmingham (pre 1900), Manchester (pre 1900), and Cork, Ireland (pre 1900).

Notable people with the surname include:

- CJ Skuse (born 1980), English novelist and lecturer
- Cole Skuse (born 1986), English footballer
- Frederick A. Askew Skuse (c. 1863–1896), British-Australian entomologist
- Janet 'Rusty' Skuse (1943–2007), most tattooed woman in Britain
- Jean Skuse (born 1932), Australian Christian church official
- Sarah Skuse (born 1974), British entrepreneur

ru:Скьюз
