= Buttertubs Pass =

Road in the Yorkshire Dales, England

Coordinates: 54.36020°N 2.19610°W

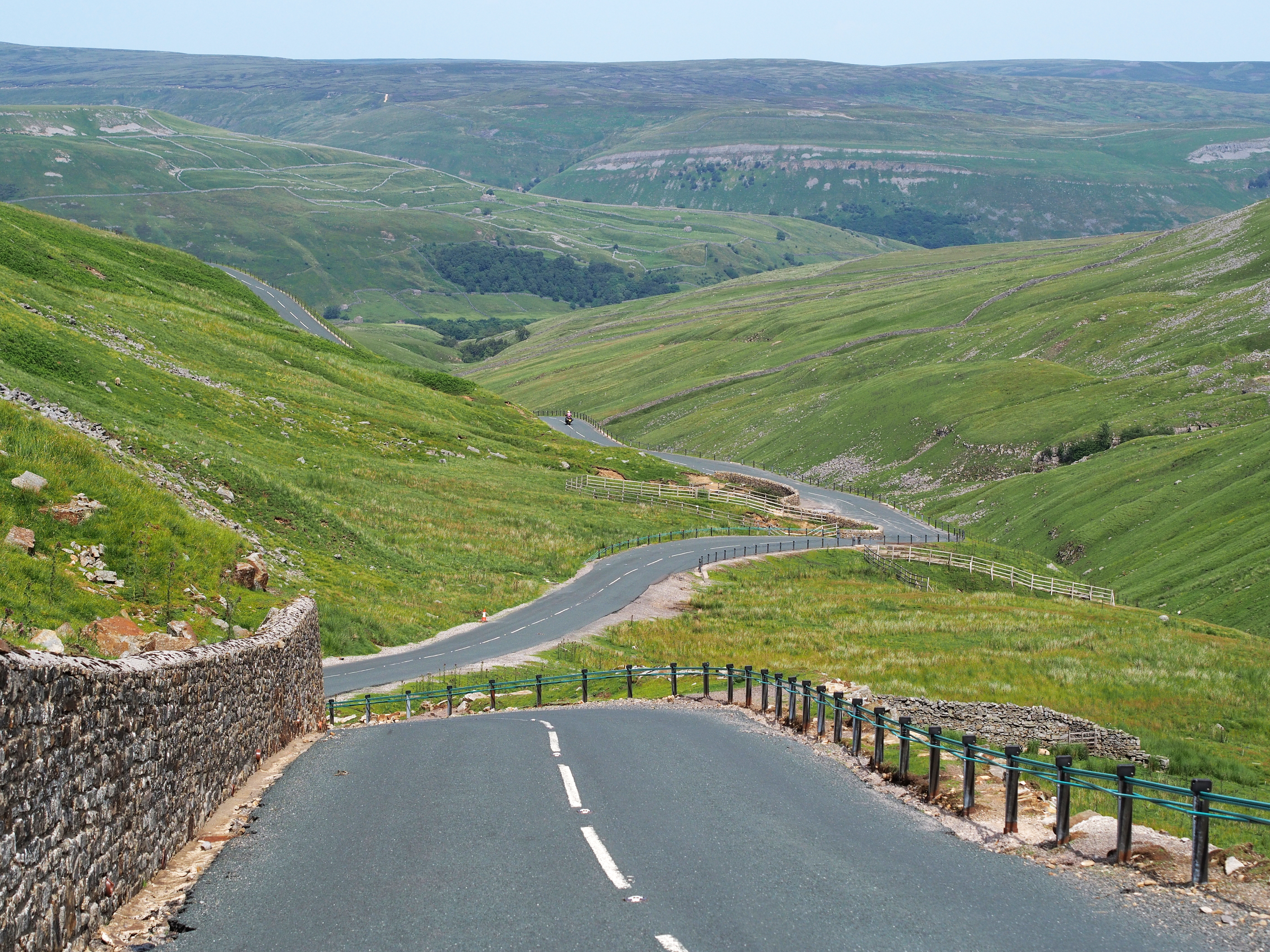
Road seen from the summit to the north

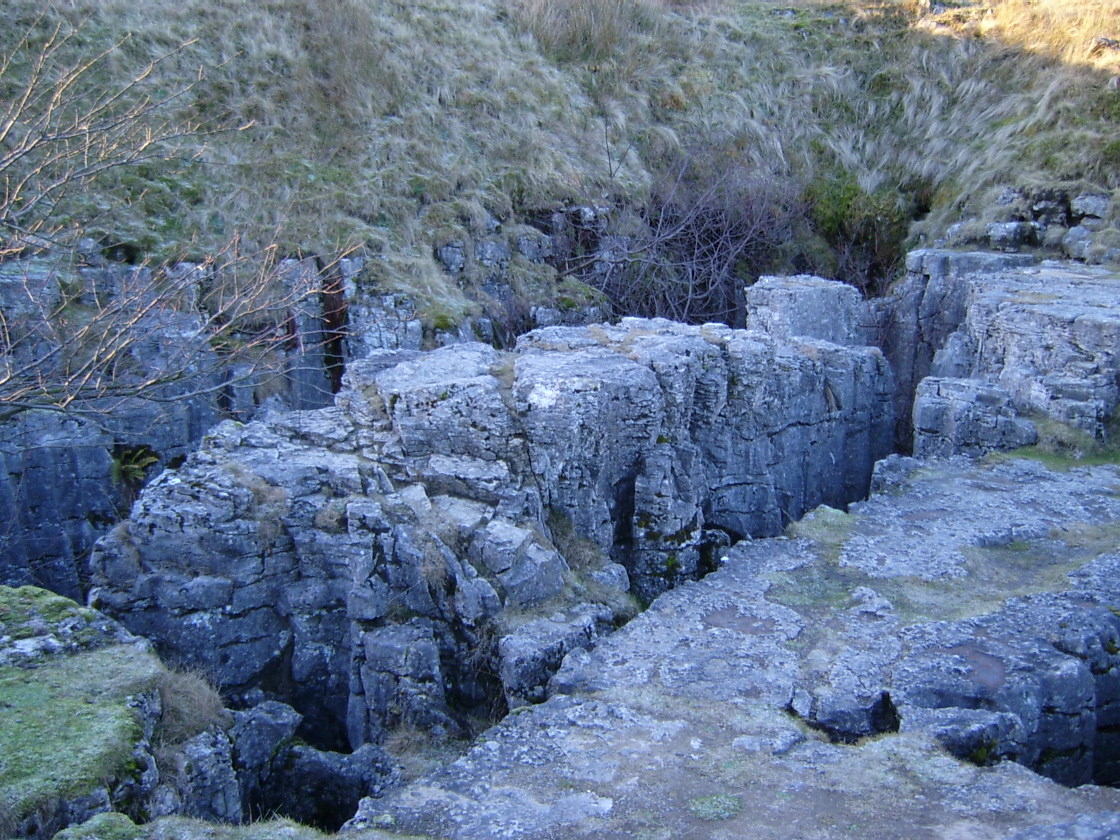
The Buttertubs

The Buttertubs Pass is a high road in the Yorkshire Dales, England. The road winds its way north from Simonstone near Hawes towards Thwaite and Muker past 20-metre-deep (66 ft) limestone potholes called the Buttertubs. It is said that the name of the potholes came from the times when farmers would rest there on their way to market. During hot weather they would lower the butter they had produced into the potholes to keep it cool.

The road is locally noted as a challenging cycle climb and featured as the second, and highest of three categorised climbs in Stage One of the 2014 Tour de France. The race was led over the climb by German veteran Jens Voigt, on his way to becoming the 2014 race's first wearer of the polka dot jersey as leader of the mountains classification. The climb was to be featured during the men's elite road race of the 2019 UCI Road World Championships, but the race had to be rerouted due to heavy rain.

Jeremy Clarkson featured the road in the "Motoring and the New Romantics" episode of the British series Clarkson's Car Years. This road has also been used many times in the BBC's Top Gear series for test driving cars.

The Buttertubs Pass is mentioned in the 1971 folk-rock song "The Gipsy", by Mr. Fox.
