= Lunds Church =

Anglican church in North Yorkshire, England

Coordinates: 54°20′46″N 2°19′07″W

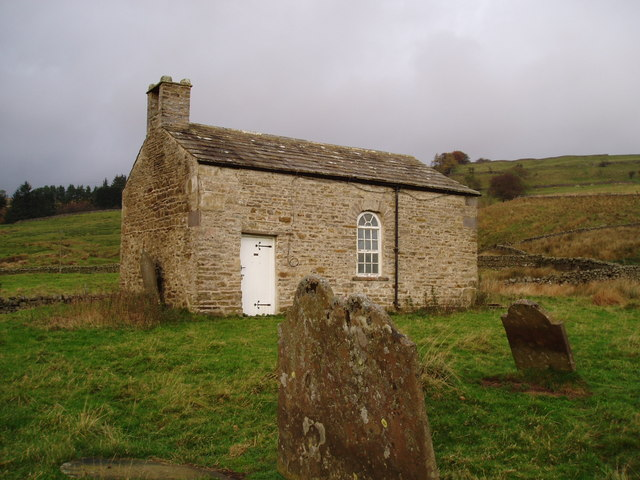
The church, in 2006

Lunds Church is a redundant Anglican church in the hamlet of Lunds, North Yorkshire, in England.

Lunds lies in a remote location in Upper Wensleydale. In the early 18th century, it lay in the parish of St Oswald's Church, Askrigg, but was more than 12 miles away from the parish church. A chapel of ease was constructed for the local residents, and was recorded in 1718. The current building dates from the mid 18th century. It was the smallest church in the Diocese of Ripon, with a capacity of 60 worshippers. It closed in 1981 and its condition deteriorated, though it remained in church ownership. In 2011, it was used for scenes in the film Wuthering Heights. Restoration work started in 2023. It has been grade II listed since 1969.

The church is built of stone and was formerly rendered. It has a stone slate roof. It has a single storey and three bays; it is rectangular, measuring about 24 feet (7.3 m) by 14 feet (4.3 m). On the front is a doorway and a round-arched casement window. In the right return is a round-arched fixed window, and on the left gable is a bellcote. Inside there are the original 18th-century benches. The restoration work plans to replace the door and windows, reinstate an inscription above the east window reading "God is Love", and reinstate the tiled flooring and altar rail dating from about 1800. The bell will also be returned from the Dales Countryside Museum.

== See also ==
- Listed buildings in High Abbotside
