= Skewes (hamlet) =

Hamlet in Cornwall, England

Coordinates: 50.4531°N 4.8589°W

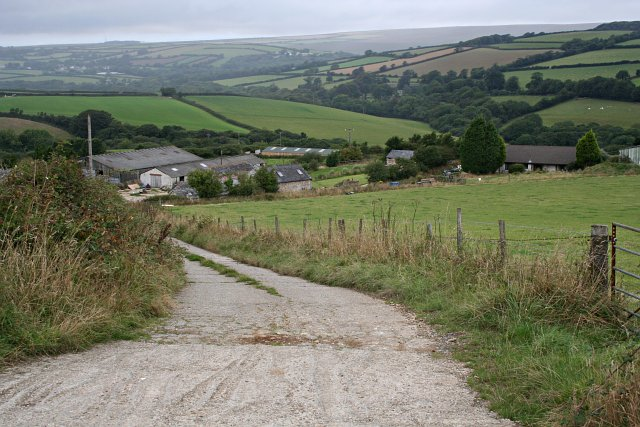
- Little Skewes Farm

- Location within Cornwall
- Civil parish: St Wenn
- Unitary authority: Cornwall
- Ceremonial county: Cornwall
- Region: South West
- Country: England
- Sovereign state: United Kingdom
- Police: Devon and Cornwall
- Fire: Cornwall
- Ambulance: South Western

Skewes is a hamlet in the civil parish of St Wenn in mid Cornwall, England, United Kingdom.
