= Simonstone, North Yorkshire =

Hamlet in North Yorkshire, England

Coordinates: 54.318880°N 2.198430°W

Simonstone
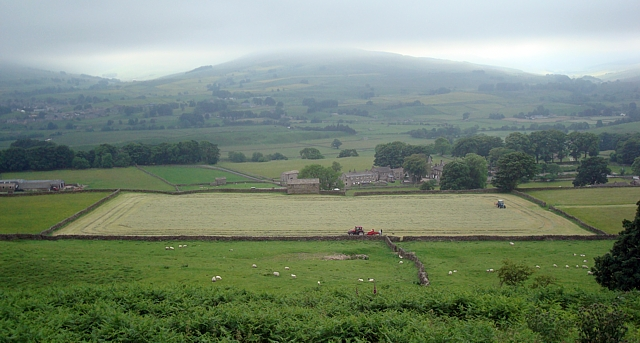
- Countryside around Simonstone

- Location within North Yorkshire
- OS grid reference: SD871914
- Civil parish: High Abbotside
- Unitary authority: North Yorkshire
- Ceremonial county: North Yorkshire
- Region: Yorkshire and the Humber
- Country: England
- Sovereign state: United Kingdom
- Post town: Hawes
- Postcode district: DL8
- Police: North Yorkshire
- Fire: North Yorkshire
- Ambulance: Yorkshire
- UK Parliament: Richmond and Northallerton

Simonstone is a hamlet near Hawes and Hardraw Force within the Yorkshire Dales in North Yorkshire, England. The name is first recorded in 1301 as deriving from Sigemund's Rock.

From 1974 to 2023 it was part of the district of Richmondshire, it is now administered by the unitary North Yorkshire Council.

The road heading south from the Buttertubs Pass passes through the hamlet.
