= Listed buildings in Askrigg =

Askrigg is a civil parish in the county of North Yorkshire, England. It contains 38 listed buildings that are recorded in the National Heritage List for England. Of these, two are listed at Grade I, the highest of the three grades, one is at Grade II*, the middle grade, and the others are at Grade II, the lowest grade. The parish contains the village of Askrigg, the hamlet of Woodhall, and the surrounding countryside. Most of the listed buildings are houses, cottages and associated structures. The others include a church, shops, farmhouses and farm buildings, a hotel, former mills, a market cross, a village pump and a telephone kiosk.

== Key ==
Grade	Criteria
I	Buildings of exceptional interest, sometimes considered to be internationally important
II*	Particularly important buildings of more than special interest
II	Buildings of national importance and special interest

== Buildings ==
Name and location	Photograph	Date	Notes	Grade
St Oswald's Church; 54.31471°N 2.08202°W		15th century	The church has been altered and extended through the centuries, including rebuilding the east end in 1854. It is built in stone with a lead roof, and consists of a nave and a chancel with a clerestory in one unit, north and south aisles, a south porch and a west tower. The tower has three stages, in the ground floor is a two-light cinquefoiled window with Perpendicular tracery in a pointed arch with a hood mould, and the middle stage contains a single-light trefoiled window. In the top stage are two-light bell openings with hood moulds, a clock face on the east side, and an embattled parapet with corner pinnacles. The nave and chancel also have embattled parapets, and the east window is in Perpendicular style with five lights.	I
West End House; 54.31503°N 2.08208°W		15th century (probable)	The house is in stone on a plinth, with a stone slate roof and a coped gable on the left. There are two storeys and a T-shaped plan, with a front range of three bays and a rear wing. The central doorway has an architrave and a keystone. The windows on the front are sashes in architraves, in the rear wing are two two-light chamfered mullioned windows, and elsewhere there are the remains of mullions.	II*
Nappa Hall; 54.31288°N 2.05416°W		1459	A fortified manor house with a wing added in the 17th century, it is in stone with quoins, and stone slate roofs with parapets, some embattled. The building consists of a single-storey hall with a four-storey west tower and a two-storey east tower, a southeast wing projecting at right angles from the east tower, and a porch in the angle. The porch has a pointed arch with a chamfered moulded surround and a similar inner arch. Attached to the west tower is a taller stair tower, and the windows have cusped pointed lights and hood moulds. In the hall are two two-light transomed windows and three smaller windows, and in the wing is a sash window.	I
The Cottage; 54.31505°N 2.08200°W		17th century	The cottage is in stone with an artificial stone slate roof, two storeys and two bays. The central doorway has a deep and chamfered lintel. The windows are sashes, those in the ground floor with slab lintels, and in the upper floor with double-chamfered surrounds. In the right return is a blocked two-light mullioned window and a single light.	II
Church View south of Sykes's House; 54.31459°N 2.08122°W		1687	The house is in stone, with a stone slate roof, two storeys and two bays. The central doorway has a quoined moulded surround, and a lintel with a motif of two semicircular niches, and recessed panels with initials and the date in raised lettering. To the left is a doorway with a four-light fanlight and a deep lintel.	II
Ballowfield; 54.29953°N 2.01465°W	—	Late 17th to early 18th century	A stone house with quoins and a stone slate roof. There are two storeys, three bays and a rear wing. The central doorway has a chamfered quoined surround and a fanlight. The windows on the front are mullioned with two or three lights, and at the rear are two round-arched single-light windows.	II
Former Conservative Club; 54.31513°N 2.08038°W		Late 17th to early 18th century	The club, later used for other purposes, is in stone, with stone gutter brackets, and a stone slate roof with shaped kneelers. There are three storeys and two bays. The doorway has a chamfered surround with interrupted jambs, a fanlight, and a raised lintel with a recessed motif, and the windows are sashes.	II
Sykes's House; 54.31465°N 2.08113°W		Late 17th to early 18th century	A shop with living accommodation above in stone, with stone gutter brackets and a stone slate roof. There are three storeys and three bays. In the centre is a doorway flanked by segmental bay windows, and over the ground floor is a continuous lead-covered canopy. The upper floor contains sash windows.	II
Woodhall Park; 54.30620°N 2.03358°W	—	Late 17th to early 18th century	A house that was altered in 1828, it is in stone, with shaped gutter brackets, and a stone slate roof with stone copings and shaped kneelers. There are two storeys and four bays. The doorway has a chamfered quoined surround, the windows in the middle of the ground floor are horizontally-sliding sashes, in the outer bays they are casements, and the upper floor contains sash windows. On the front is an initialled and dated rainwater head.	II
Arncliffe Farmhouse; 54.30705°N 2.03751°W		1709	The farmhouse is in stone with quoins, and a stone slate roof with stone copings and shaped kneelers. There are two storeys and three bays. In the centre is a doorway in a round-arched surround with plinths and imposts, and the windows on the front are sashes. At the rear is a central doorway with a chamfered quoined surround and an inscribed and dated lintel. There is a round-arched stair window, and the other windows are mullioned.	II
Robinson's Gateways and Archway House; 54.31535°N 2.07982°W		Early to mid 18th century	A pair of round carriage arches with chamfered rusticated pilasters, cornices, voussoirs and keystones. The right arch is infilled with a two-storey house, that has a doorway, a three-light mullioned window to the right, and a sash windows above.	II
Church View north of Sykes's House; 54.31471°N 2.08115°W		Mid to late 18th century	A stone house on a plinth, with quoins on the left, continuous hood moulds, and a stone slate roof. There are three storeys and two bays. In the centre is a blocked doorway, and to the right is a doorway with a moulded lintel and an inscribed keystone. The windows are sashes.	II
Kings Arms Hotel; 54.31509°N 2.08048°W		1767	The hotel is in stone with a stone slate roof. There are three storeys, three bays and a rear wing. In the left bay is a doorway in a round-arched architrave on plinths, with imposts and a tripartite keystone, and to the right is a mounting block with four steps. The windows are sashes in architraves.	II
The Manor House; 54.31508°N 2.08070°W		1767	The house is in stone with a stone slate roof. There are three storeys, five bays and a rear outshut. The central doorway has an architrave with splayed bases, and a cornice on consoles. The windows are sashes in architraves, and there is a decorated and dated lead rainwater head.	II
The Bakewell; 54.31506°N 2.08090°W		1770	A shop, later a restaurant, in stone, with a stone slate roof, three storeys and two bays. On the front are two round-arched doorways with architraves on plinths with imposts and keystones, the left keystone dated. Flanking the left doorway are square plate glass bay windows, and in the upper floors are sash windows in architraves.	II
Grenada Hall; 54.31598°N 2.07839°W		c. 1782	The house is pebbledashed, and has a stone slate roof with stone coping and a kneeler on the left. There are two storeys and five bays. The doorway has an eared architrave with splayed bases and a cornice, and the windows are sashes in architraves.	II
Flax Mill Farm; 54.31505°N 2.08645°W	—	c. 1785	A former water-powered cotton, then flax, mill, later a house and an outbuilding. It is in stone with quoins and a stone slate roof. There are three storeys and five bays, and a two-storey rear wing. On the front are doorways and sash windows, and there is a large paired chimney stack forming a bellcote.	II
Former coach house and stable block 54.31581°N 2.08041°W	—	Late 18th to early 19th century	The former coach house and stable block are in stone with quoins and a stone slate roof. There are two storeys and eleven bays. On the front are two round-arched coach openings, doorways, and windows with projecting sills and sill-like lintels. In the right return are two blocked oculi with keystones.	II
Croft House; 54.31502°N 2.08278°W		Late 18th to early 19th century	A stone house with quoins on the left, and a stone slate roof. There are two storeys and three bays. It has a central doorway and the windows are sashes. On the left is an added bay with a door in a segmental-arched cart opening, and a sash window in a former pitching door above.	II
Kennels; 54.31575°N 2.08043°W	—	Late 18th to early 19th century	The kennels below the forecourt of the former stable block are in stone. They consist of a semicircular wall containing four doorways leading to the kennels.	II
Wall and doorway, Lodge Yard; 54.31589°N 2.08096°W	—	Late 18th to early 19th century	The wall is in stone with stepped slab coping, it is about 2 metres (6 ft 7 in) high, and extends for about 30 metres (98 ft). At the south end is a round-arched doorway with impost jambs, imposts and a tripartite keystone.	II
Nappa House; 54.30966°N 2.06185°W	—	Late 18th to early 19th century	A mill house, later a private house, it is in stone on a boulder plinth, with quoins and a stone slate roof. There are two storeys and five bays. The central doorway has an architrave on plinths, a basket-arched soffit, a pulvinated frieze and a cornice, and the windows are sashes.	II
The Wool Room; 54.31549°N 2.08036°W	—	Late 18th to early 19th century	The building, later used for other purposes, is in stone with a stone slate roof. There are two storeys, a west front of two bays, and a north front with a long range and external steps. In the ground floor are large openings.	II
Wendal and the house to the northeast 54.31500°N 2.08032°W	—	Late 18th to early 19th century	A pair of houses in stone, with quoins on the right, and a stone slate roof with a shaped kneeler on the right. There are three storeys and four bays. On the front are two doorways with architraves on plinths, most of the windows are sashes, and there is one casement window.	II
The Lodge; 54.31543°N 2.08075°W	—	1802	A house in stone with quoins, and a stone slate roof coped on the left. There are two storeys and three bays, and two single-storey bays to the right. The doorway has a surround on plinths with imposts and a tripartite keystone, and a fanlight with decorative glazing, and the windows are sashes with deep lintels. In the single-storey wing are two round-arched openings, partly blocked, forming small windows.	II
Outbuilding north of The Lodge; 54.31552°N 2.08088°W	—	c. 1802	The outbuilding is in stone with a hipped stone slate roof and two storeys. On the right is a round-arched doorway with a surround on plinths, with imposts and a keystone. To the left, steps lead to an upper floor doorway.	II
Salisbury House and railings 54.31511°N 2.07986°W	—	1818	Two houses, later combined, in stone with stone slate roofs. The left house has three storeys and three bays. The central doorway has a surround with splayed bases, a three-light fanlight, a basket-arched soffit to the lintel, a pulvinated frieze and a cornice, and the windows on the front are sashes. At the rear is a round-arched landing window with imposts and a keystone. The house to the right is recessed and has two storeys and two bays. The doorway has a plain surround and above it is an initialled and dated panel, and the windows are sashes. To the right are doorways in a segmental arch with voussoirs and a hood mould, and above it is a pitching door. In front of the house are wrought iron railings.	II
Peninver House; 54.31492°N 2.08254°W		Early 19th century	The house is in stone, with stone gutter brackets and a stone slate roof. There are two storeys and two bays. The central doorway has a surround with splayed bases, and a slab cornice on brackets, and the windows are sashes.	II
Wool Room Cottage; 54.31536°N 2.08053°W	—	Early 19th century	Assembly rooms, later two cottages, subsequently combined into one cottage, it is in stone with quoins on the left, and a stone slate rook with stone coping and a shaped kneeler on the left. On the front are two doorways, the windows in the ground floor are casements, and in the upper floor they are sashes.	II
Market Cross; 54.31489°N 2.08129°W		1830	The market cross, replacing an earlier cross, is in stone. It has an octagonal shaft and a square base, and stands on six octagonal steps.	II
New Row and railings 54.31463°N 2.08258°W		1834	A row of six, later five, cottages in stone with quoins and a stone slate roof. There are two storeys and six bays. The windows are sashes, and in the centre is an inscribed and dated plaque. In front of the terrace are railings with fleur-de-lis finials and turned-baluster standards.	II
Woodburn House and railings 54.31625°N 2.07913°W		1834	The house is in stone, with a floor band, shaped gutter brackets, and a hipped stone slate roof. There are two storeys and three bays, The central doorway has a pulvinated frieze and a cornice, and the windows are sashes. At the rear is an initialled and dated rainwater head. In front of the house are wrought iron railings on a dwarf wall, and a gate, all with fleur-de-lis finials.	II
Cringley House and railings 54.31479°N 2.08103°W		Early to mid 19th century	The house, later named Skeldale House, is in stone with a sill band, triple gutter brackets, and a stone slate roof with stone copings. There are three storeys and three bays. The central doorway has a Tuscan doorcase, and the windows are sashes with deep lintels. In front of the house are cast iron railings with spear finials on a low stone plinth.	II
The Big Laithe; 54.31024°N 2.05359°W	—	Early to mid 19th century	A field barn in stone that has a stone slate roof with shaped kneelers and the remains of coping. There are two storeys and an H-shaped plan. It contains various openings, including doorways, some with segmental arches and voussoirs, pitching doors, and windows.	II
West Mill; 54.31628°N 2.08841°W		Early to mid 19th century	A watermill in stone, with slab quoins, projecting through-stones, and a stone slate roof. There are three storeys and an L-shaped plan. In the ground floor is a doorway, and in the middle floor is an opening. Inside, there is an overshot waterwheel and an iron pit wheel.	II
Stable block and loose boxes, Nappa Hall; 54.31274°N 2.05466°W		Mid 19th century	The farm buildings are in stone with stone slate roofs. The stable block has two storeys and seven bays. It contains a carriage entrance and doorways with four-centred arches, and other doorways with chamfered surrounds on plinths and hood moulds. The loose boxes in the angle between the stable block and the hall have a single storey and a loft, and three bays. They contain doors, and steps leading up to the hayloft.	II
Pump; 54.31490°N 2.08120°W		1849	The former pump in Market Square is in stone, with a circular plan and a chamfered base. It has a shaft with a wrought iron handle, the scar of a spout, and a cap with a knob finial.	II
Telephone kiosk 54.31457°N 2.08158°W		1935	The K6 type telephone kiosk in Market Place was designed by Giles Gilbert Scott. Constructed in cast iron with a square plan and a dome, it has three unperforated crowns in the top panels.	II
