= Cobscar Mill =

Mill building in Redmire, England

Coordinates: 54°19′59″N 1°54′37″W

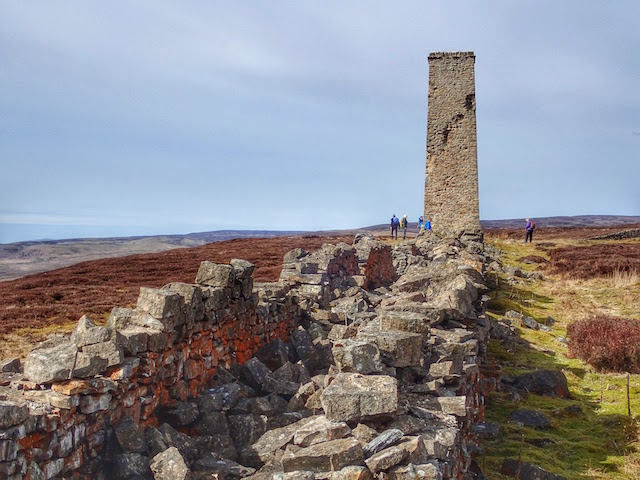
Ruins including the chimney, in 2015

Cobscar Mill is a ruined building near Redmire, a village in North Yorkshire, in England.

Lead was mined from Cobscar Rake from an early date. In 1762, James Plews constructed a watermill to smelt ore from the rake, and also from nearby Cranehow Bottom Mine. The mine was described in 1823 as "nearly exhausted", and the mill probably closed in about 1830. In 1848, William Orde-Powlett, 2nd Baron Bolton, had the mine refurbished as a replacement for Apedale Mill, the work including the construction of a roasting furnace and a flue. In 1855, a long flue from Keld Heads Mine was constructed, to join the one from Cobscar Mill. The mill probably closed in about 1890, and it was partly demolished by the British Army in the late 1940s. The surviving chimney was grade II listed in 1970, while the remainder of the mill became a scheduled monument in 1997.

The mill was divided into three bays, with a waterwheel with a diameter of around 6 metres powering bellows in the central bay, which blew two ore hearths in the southern bay, and an ore hearth in the northern bay. The walls survive to around 2 metres high, and up to 4 metres in one section. The roasting furnace survives in part, as do some sections of the flue. Other ruins include a range of storage buildings to the east, and a courtyard and further storage buildings to the south. The chimney is built of stone, with a square plan. It tapers slightly, and rises to a height of about 12 metres (39 ft). It has a semicircular arch of rubble voussoirs over the opening to the flue, and a cornice near the top.

== See also ==
- Listed buildings in Redmire
