= West End House, Askrigg =

Building in Askrigg, North Yorkshire, England

Coordinates: 54°18′54″N 2°04′56″W

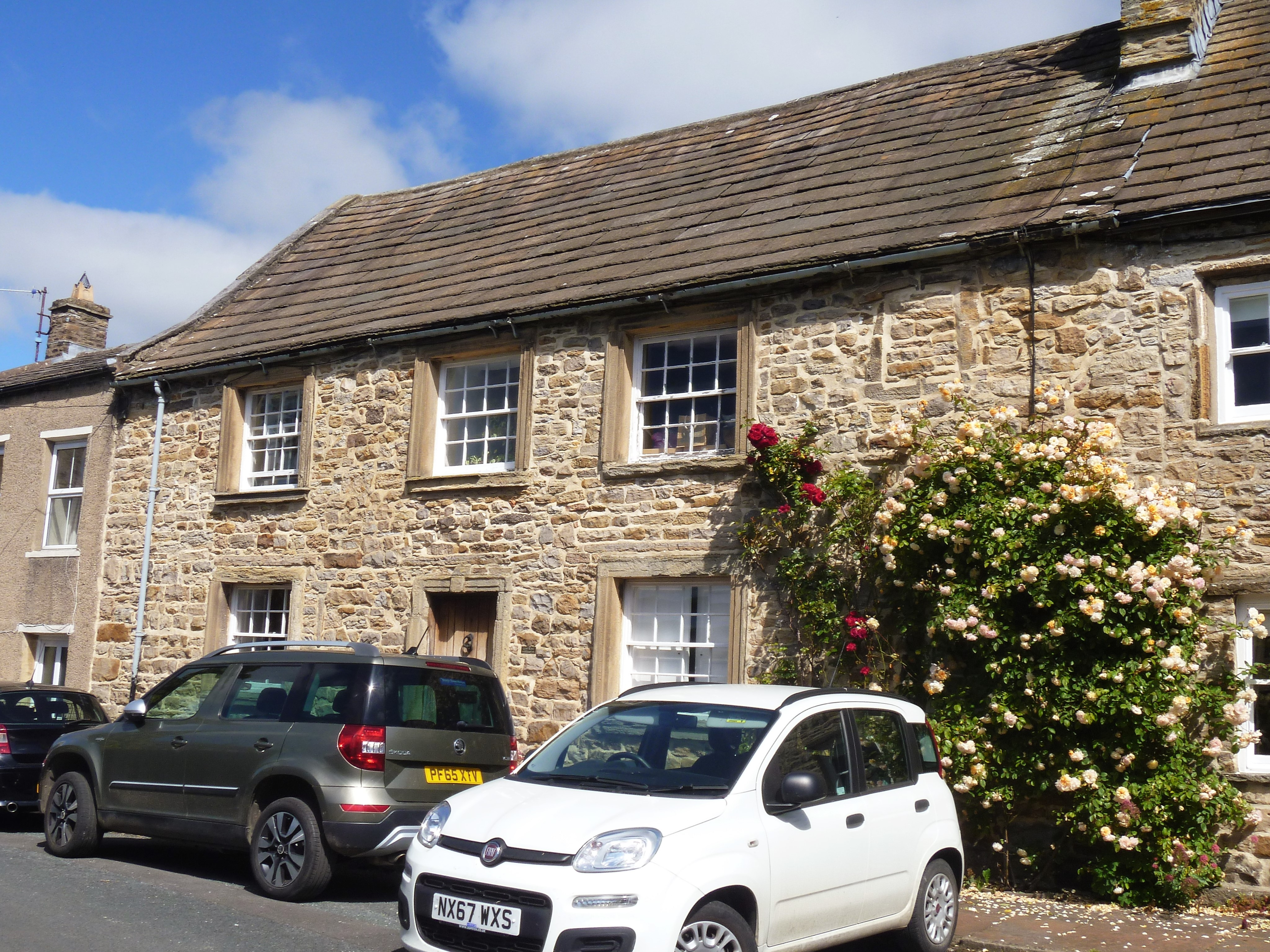
The building, in 2022

West End House is a historic building in Askrigg, a village in North Yorkshire, in England.

The house is known to have existed as early as the 14th century, when it was owned by the Scrope family of Bolton Castle. The older parts of the current building probably date from the 15th century. In the 16th century, it passed to the Thornton family. Many current features of the building date from the 17th and 18th centuries. It was Grade II* listed in 1969. In the late 20th and early 21st century, the artist Janet Rawlins lived in the house.

The two-storey house is built of stone rubble, and has a stone slate roof. It has a T-shaped plan, with the front being three bays wide, with a central oak board door. The windows are sashes, with 16 panes, while on the other fronts, there are remains of some mullioned windows. Inside, the doors and window shutters are late 18th century, while in the right-hand ground floor room, there is 17th century panelling and a frieze, which is said to have been relocated from Pendragon Castle. There is a fireplace of similar date, and salt and spice boxes. The left-hand room has a 17th-century frieze, depicting acorns and pomegranates. The main staircase is spiral and built of oak, replacing an earlier stone staircase. There is a beehive oven and large bessemer oven in the rear wing. Upstairs, one internal wall is constructed of plastered reed.

== See also ==
- Listed buildings in Askrigg
