= John Terry (miller) =

Australian settler (1771–1844)

John Terry (21 January 1771 – 8 July 1844) was an early settler and pioneer farmer in New Norfolk, Tasmania.

Born in Askrigg in the Yorkshire Dales, he was the eldest son of John Terry of The Mill, Redmire and Grace Green. The Terrys also had milling and other interests in Bedale, Forcett and Askrigg.

He married Martha Powell on 12 July 1797 and continued in the family milling business until, in October 1818, John and Martha, their eight daughters, three sons and two millstones sailed from Sheerness, England on the Surrey, the only "free" settlers on a convict ship to Sydney, Australia.

Possibly unhappy with the terms of the lease and the size of the allotment at Liverpool, south-west of Sydney, Terry moved his family and business to Van Diemen's Land. Arriving in Hobart Town on the Prince Leopold on 6 December 1819, the family proceeded to build the mill on 100 acres (40 ha) at Elizabeth Town (soon to be renamed New Norfolk), where the Derwent and Lachlan Rivers met.

By the end of 1820 Terry was grinding wheat on what was now known as the 'Lachlan River Mill'. Further to this he took up a grant of 1,400 acres (567 ha) at nearby Macquarie Plains (later renamed Gretna). This property he called 'Askrigg', named after the village of his birth. In 1827 he purchased 'Slateford', a property at Hayes.

In about 1822, on the 'Lachlan River Mill' estate, Terry built a granary; circa 1830 the family built the house that was to later be named 'Tynwald'; and, after introducing hops to the estate in the 1860s, John's youngest son Ralph built an Oast house. All three buildings still stand to this day.

Terry's letters back to England provide an insight into thoughts many early migrants must have experienced, looking with wonder at a land very foreign to them. In a letter written in 1822 he described some of his first impressions.

'Wild duck in great numbers as many as 200 or 300, rise at once. Black swans and land quails, wild pidgeons coloured like a peacock, and fish in great plenty … Trees here cast a shell of bark, not leaves. Wood, when cut green, sinks in the water like a stone. Your shortest day is our longest, so you summer when our winter. The cuckoo cries in the night, and mostly in our winter the man in the moon is with his legs upwards'.

John Terry died at his home on 8 July 1844. The millstones that accompanied him from Yorkshire now sit outside St Matthew's Close in New Norfolk. A window dedicated to John and Martha Terry appears amongst the impressive stained glass windows of St Matthew's Anglican Church in New Norfolk. It bears a line from the letter quoted above. The line he wrote next suggests confidence that it was worth the effort.

'I threw off my coat and rose with the sun wrought all that came to hand. I now thank God and consider myself and my family in a very comfortable position'.
