= Blow George =

A Blow George is an implement used in firelighting. It consists of an iron or steel plate with either a rectangular opening or holes drilled into the lower half. It is held against the surround of an open fire and accelerates the chimney draw, significantly increasing the efficiency of firelighting. It is an application of the venturi effect. The implement was named after George Atkinson of Askrigg.

Atkinson applied similar principles to mine shaft ventilation, and later to steam engines, and in each case referred to the device as a "Blow George".
