= Kings Arms Hotel, Askrigg =

Listed pub in North Yorkshire, England

Kings Arms Hotel
- The pub in 2015
- Interactive map of the Kings Arms Hotel area

General information
- Type: Public house
- Location: Main Street, Askrigg, North Yorkshire, England
- Coordinates: 54.31512°N 2.0804789°W
- Completed: c. 1767; 259 years ago
- Client: John Pratt

Design and construction
- Designations

Listed Building – Grade II
- Official name: The King's Arms Hotel
- Designated: 16 January 1952
- Reference no.: 1157329

Website
- kingsarmsaskrigg.com

The Kings Arms Hotel is a public house on Main Street in Askrigg, a village in North Yorkshire, England. A Grade II listed building standing on the northern side of Main Street, it dates to around 1767.

The inn was built by John Pratt, a local man who had made his fortune as a horse jockey at Newmarket Racecourse. John and Joseph Lodge purchased the pub in 1800.

== All Creatures Great and Small ==
The pub doubled as Darrowby's Drovers Arms in the BBC television series All Creatures Great and Small (1978–1990). Photographs on its interior walls showed the cast drinking at the establishment during downtime.

The Drovers was made out to be located beside the church in the early series, as evidenced in the episode "The Name of the Game". "It was fun to design the Drovers, which later on they did on location in Askrigg," explained designer David Crozier. "But in the early days these scenes were all done at Pebble Mill."

== See also ==
- Listed buildings in Askrigg

== Gallery ==
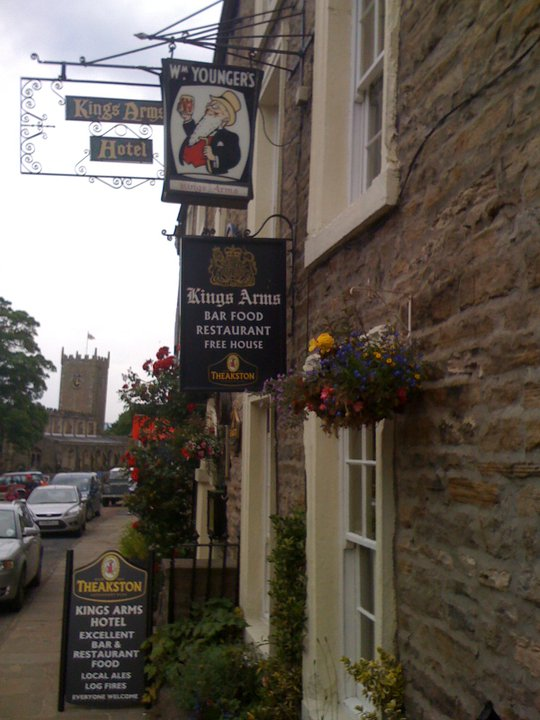
The pub's main entrance in 2011, including a sign for W. M. Youngers Brewery. St Oswald's Church is in the background
