= Listed buildings in Redmire =

Redmire is a civil parish in the county of North Yorkshire, England. It contains eleven listed buildings that are recorded in the National Heritage List for England. Of these, one is listed at Grade II*, the middle of the three grades, and the others are at Grade II, the lowest grade. The parish contains the village of Redmire and the surrounding countryside. Most of the listed buildings are houses and farmhouses, and the others include a church, a disused water pump, and the chimney of a former lead smelting mill.

== Key ==
Grade	Criteria
II*	Particularly important buildings of more than special interest
II	Buildings of national importance and special interest

== Buildings ==
Name and location	Photograph	Date	Notes	Grade
St Mary's Church; 54.31279°N 1.92337°W		12th century	The church has been altered and extended through the centuries. It is built in stone, and consists of a nave, a south porch with a Welsh slate roof, a chancel, and a north vestry with a stone slate roof. On the west gable is a bellcote, and on the body of the church are quoins, parapets, and gargoyles. The south doorway is Norman, with one order of shafts with scalloped capitals, and chevrons in the arch.	II*
Lightfoot Hall and Lightfoot House; 54.31606°N 1.93142°W	—	Late 16th to early 17th century	A house divided into two houses, in stone, with a stone slate roof, shaped kneelers and stone coping. There are two storeys and a front range of three bays. On the front are two round-headed arches with voussoirs, infilled, one with a doorway and window, and the other with a window. To the right is a fire window with a chamfered frame. The upper floor contains sash windows. At the rear is a gabled wing containing a mullioned window on the ground floor, and a cross window above with a hood mould.	II
Hogra Farmhouse and calf house 54.31637°N 1.93012°W	—	Late 17th century	A farmhouse and calf house under one roof, they are in stone and have a Welsh slate roof, with a kneeler and stone coping on the left. There are two storeys and four bays. The house has a doorway with a chamfered surround, some of the windows are mullioned, and others are casements. The calf house has a doorway, the surround of a mullioned window, and a pitching door to the hayloft above.	II
Manor House; 54.31782°N 1.93172°W	—	Late 17th century	The farmhouse is in stone and has a slate roof, coped on the left. There are two storeys and five bays. On the front are two doorways, one with a trellised porch, and the windows are sashes. At the rear is a semicircular stair turret.	II
Old Elm House; 54.31679°N 1.93022°W	—	1694	Two cottages combined into a house, in stone, partly roughcast, with shaped stone gutter brackets, and a stone slate roof with a kneeler and stone coping on the left. There are two storeys and five bays. The doorway has a chamfered surround, and above it is an initialled and dated stone. The windows vary; some are mullioned, there is a blocked fire window with a chamfered surround and a segmental head, and a fixed window, and the others are casements and sashes. At the rear is a double semicircular stair turret.	II
Priory House; 54.31589°N 1.93199°W	—	1743	The house is in roughcast stone with a stone slate roof. There are two storeys and five bays. In the centre is a door in a Tuscan doorcase with an inscribed frieze, and the windows are sashes with sandstone lintels. On the front of the house is a sundial, and above it is a stone with an initial and a date.	II
Pyra House; 54.31497°N 1.92982°W	—	1746	The house is in stone with a stone slate roof, two storeys and two bays. In the centre is a doorway in an architrave, and above it is an initialled and dated stone. The windows are sashes; the window to the left of the doorway has two unequal lights divided by a mullion.	II
The Swan; 54.31447°N 1.93759°W	—	1747	An inn, later three, then two cottages, in stone, with quoins and a stone slate roof with a shaped kneeler and stone coping on the left. There are two storeys and three bays. In the centre is a doorway with a doorcase on plinths, and to the right is a doorway in an architrave, above which is a dated and initialled stone. The windows are sashes in architraves, and between the upper left two windows is a small window and a blocked window below.	II
Elm House; 54.31748°N 1.92276°W	—	Late 18th century	The house is in stone with quoins and a hipped stone slate roof. There are two storeys and an irregular E-shaped plan, with a front range of six bays, the right three bays later and taller. On the front is a porch with Doric columns, a plain entablature and a blocking course, to its left is a two-storey segmental bow window with tripartite sash windows, and elsewhere, the windows are sashes. On the left return is a canted two-storey bay window, and at the rear is a service range.	II
Pump; 54.31608°N 1.93017°W	—	Late 18th century	The disused water pump is in sandstone. It has a square plan, a base, a cornice and a flat pyramidal cap.	II
Cobscar Mill Chimney; 54.33388°N 1.91324°W		1848	The chimney of a former lead smelting mill, it is in stone, with a square plan, it tapers slightly, and rises to a height of about 12 metres (39 ft). The chimney has a semicircular arch of rubble voussoirs over the opening to the flue, and a cornice near the top.	II
