= Nappa Hall =

Grade I listed manor house in North Yorkshire, England

Coordinates: 54.313°N 2.055°W

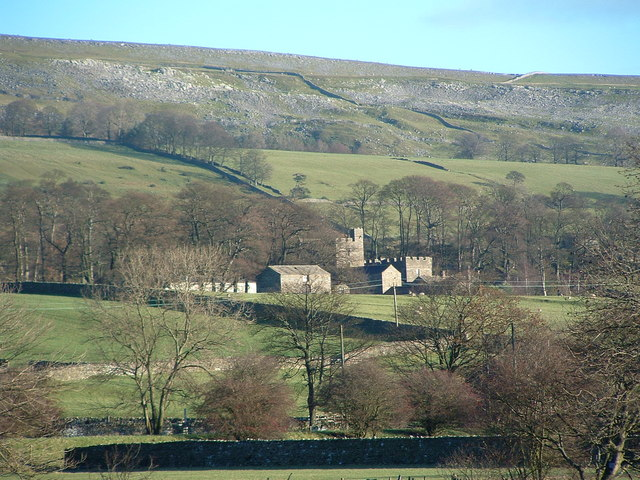
Nappa Hall

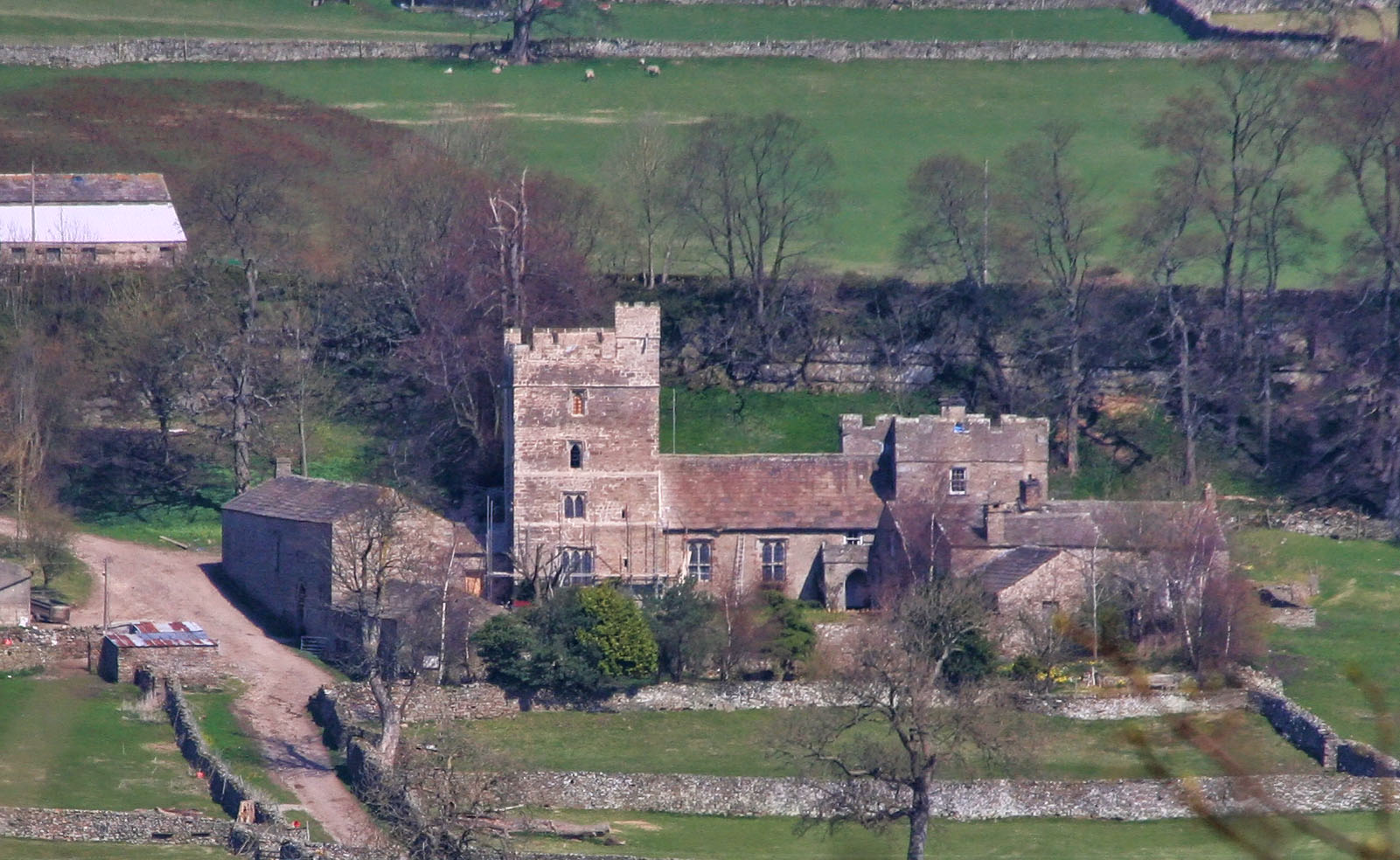
Nappa Hall

Nappa Hall is a fortified manor house in Wensleydale, North Yorkshire, England, described by English Heritage as "probably the finest and least-spoilt fortified manor house in the north of England". It stands 1-mile (1.6 km) east of Askrigg, overlooking pastures leading down to the River Ure. A single-storey central hall sits between two towers, a four-storey western tower and a two-storey eastern tower. The four-storey tower has a turret, lit by slit vents, for a spiral staircase that climbs to crenellated parapets. The taller tower retains its original windows, but sash windows were inserted in the 18th century in the lower two-storey block which housed the kitchen and service rooms, at the opposite end of the hall. In the 17th century, an extra wing was added. The battlements are served by a single stair consisting of 70 stone steps.

Nappa Hall is a Grade I listed building.

== Descent ==
The place name Nappa, first mentioned in about 1251 as Nappay, is of uncertain origin, but possibly derives from the Old English hnæpp ġehæġ, meaning "enclosure in a bowl-shaped hollow".

=== Scrope ===
The manor of Nappa was originally part of the manor of Askrigg in the North Riding of Yorkshire, but by the late 13th century was a separate estate. It was owned by the Scrope family for some generations, but in the late 14th century Richard le Scrope, 1st Baron Scrope of Bolton granted the estate to James Metcalfe (d. circa 1472) of Worton

=== Metcalfe ===
canting arms of Metcalfe: Argent, three calves sable

Nappa remained the seat of the Metcalfe family for many centuries. The descent was as follows:

- James Metcalfe (d. circa 1472) of Worton, acquired Nappa from Richard le Scrope, 1st Baron Scrope of Bolton;
- Thomas Metcalfe, second but eldest surviving son, Chancellor of the Duchy of Lancaster, who built the surviving house. A Yorkist, he sued King Henry VII for a special pardon on his accession. He became surveyor of Middleham Castle and by leasing estates in the lordship greatly increased his wealth.
- James Metcalfe (d.1539), son and heir, who held his father's offices in Wensleydale and purchased further adjoining estates;
- Christopher Metcalfe (d.1574), son and heir, Sheriff of Yorkshire in 1555, Forester of Wensleydale, Parker of Woodhall and Wanless, and supervisor of Middleham. Soon after his succession John Lord Scrope of Bolton challenged the original grant to James Metcalfe. After prolonged litigation, including secondary proceedings against Christopher for bribing a jury, the verdict seems to have been given in favour of Lord Scrope; he consented, however, to exchange the manor of Healey for Nappa. As Sheriff of Yorkshire in 1555 Christopher received the justices attended by 300 horsemen of his name and kin. From this date, however, his fortunes declined, and he was forced to sell various portions of his estates. There is a legend that Mary Queen of Scots stayed there for two nights in 1568 while under house arrest at Bolton Castle and that James I visited the house. In the 16th century John Leland described it as "a very goodly Howse".
- James Metcalfe, eldest son and heir, who died a few years later.
- Thomas Metcalfe (d.1655), son and heir, inherited as an infant aged five months. During his minority Nappa was let to two 'principal and dangerous Recusants' who were purposed 'to live obscurely.' Thomas when of age was forced to mortgage portions of his estate, and finally Nappa itself; afterwards recovering the manor, he settled it on himself in tail-male. He had lead mines on Askrigg Common.
- James Metcalfe (d.1671), eldest son and heir, who divided Nappa Hall with his brother Thomas Metcalfe. In 1663 James paid the tax for six hearths and Thomas for five. He died without male issue.
- Thomas Metcalfe (d.1684), younger brother;
- Henry Metcalfe (d.1705), only surviving brother, who settled the manor in tail-male on his son Thomas Metcalfe, 'the hopeful heir to the old ruinous house at Nappa.'
- Thomas Metcalfe, son and heir, last of the Metcalfes of Nappa, who was forced by financial trouble to settle the reversion of Nappa on his kinsman, Thomas Weddell of Earswick.

=== Weddell, Elcock ===
Thomas Weddell of Earswick, inherited Nappa from his kinsman Thomas Metcalfe. He bequeathed his right to his nephew Richard Elcock, on condition he should adopt the surname Weddell, with remainder to Thomas Robinson, 2nd Baron Grantham. The Weddells of Newby Hall made some improvements. William Weddell (1736-1792) adapted Nappa Hall as a hunting lodge, and added a stable and coach house.

=== Robinson ===
- Thomas Robinson, 2nd Baron Grantham, inherited Nappa from Weddell family;
- Thomas de Grey, 2nd Earl de Grey, eldest son and heir. He was born as Thomas Philip Robinson, his surname was Weddell from 1803 and de Grey from 1833. His younger brother was Frederick John Robinson, 1st Viscount Goderich, 1st Earl of Ripon (1782–1859), Prime Minister of the United Kingdom. Thomas de Grey died without surviving male issue, leaving his two daughters as co-heiresses.

=== Vyner ===
Lady Mary Gertrude Weddell, daughter and one of the co-heiresses of Thomas de Grey, 2nd Earl de Grey, inherited Nappa as her portion. She married Captain H. Vyner, and was lady of the manor until 1892.

=== Metcalfe (return) ===
The Metcalfes moved back in 1889, first as tenants and in 1930 as owners. William Metcalfe sold the house in 2008. The new owners have put forward plans to restore the house.

The title "Lord of the Manor of Nappa in the County of Yorkshire" remains in the Metcalfe family. The present holder is Shaun Metcalfe, who lives in New Zealand.

== See also ==
- Grade I listed buildings in North Yorkshire (district)
- Listed buildings in Askrigg
