= Newbiggin, Askrigg =

Hamlet in North Yorkshire, England

Coordinates: 54.319°N 2.071°W

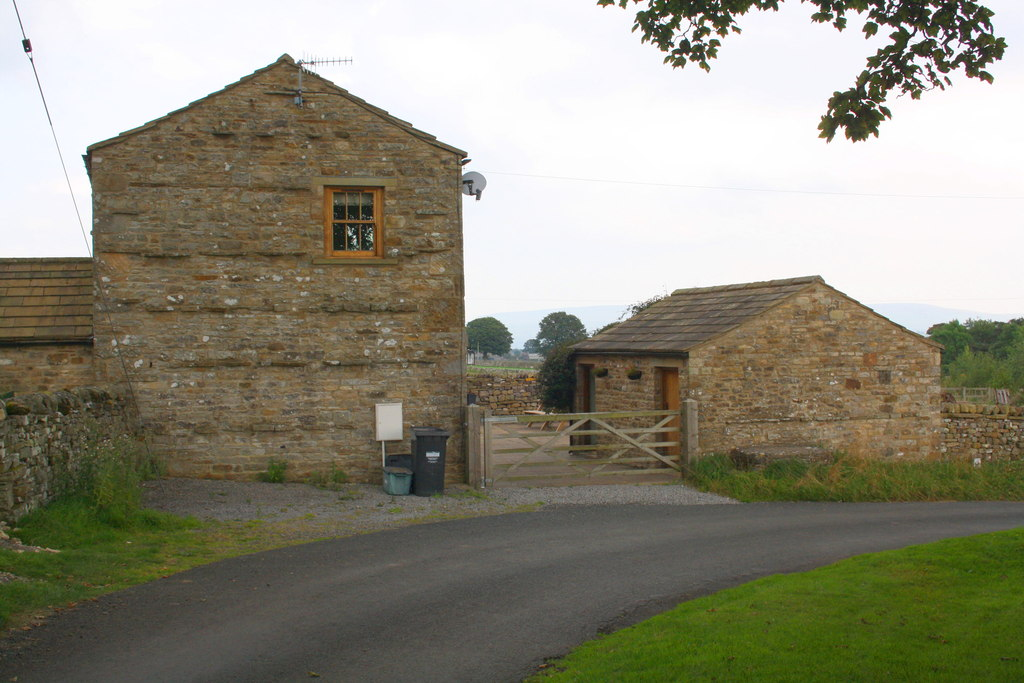
Farm buildings in Newbiggin

Newbiggin is a hamlet very close to Askrigg, North Yorkshire, England. Another Newbiggin is only about 7 miles (11 km) away. The hamlet consists of eight dwellings and other smaller buildings such as barns, just to the east of Askrigg at a height of 888 feet (270.6 m) above sea level.

From 1974 to 2023 it was part of the district of Richmondshire, it is now administered by the unitary North Yorkshire Council.

The name is first recorded in 1288 as Neubigging, and like other similarly-named places within North Yorkshire, it means New Building.
