= Askrigg market cross =

English memorial cross

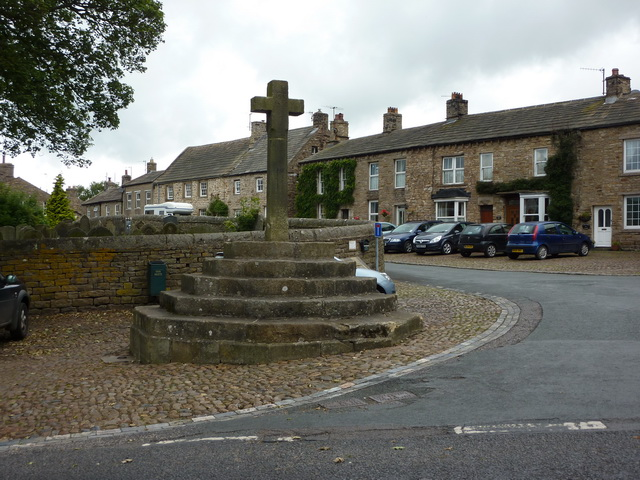
- The market cross in 2010, looking north to Main Street from Market Place

- Location within North Yorkshire
- 54.3148313°N 2.08133°W
- Location: Market Place, Askrigg, North Yorkshire, England

History
- Built: 1830 (196 years ago)

Askrigg market cross is located in Market Place, Askrigg, North Yorkshire, England. It was built in 1830, carved out of ashlar by local mason Leonard Hesletine. It is a Grade II listed structure.

The base consists of six octagonal steps. The cross shaft is also octagonal.

A two-storey tolbooth stood nearby from the late 16th century to around 1898.

== See also ==
- Listed buildings in Askrigg
