= Darrowby =

Fictional village in the North Riding of Yorkshire, England

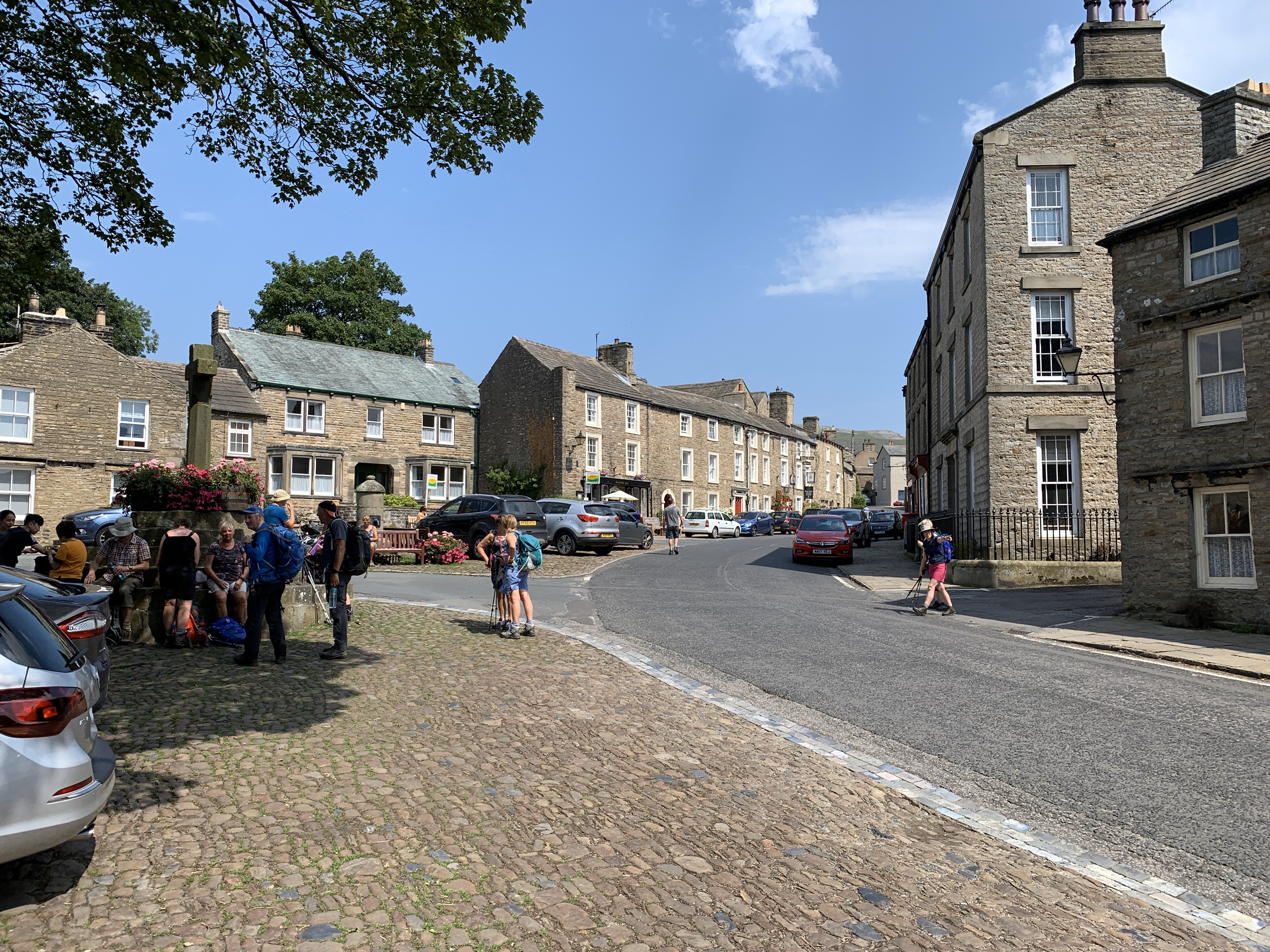
- Askrigg village centre, used as "Darrowby" for filming for the BBC TV series, with "Skeldale House" to the right
- Created by: James Herriot
- Genre: Television series

In-universe information
- Type: Village

Darrowby is a fictional village in the North Riding of Yorkshire, England, which was created by author Alf Wight under the pen name of James Herriot as the setting for the veterinary practice in his book It Shouldn't Happen to a Vet. The book has been adapted for two television series, both titled All Creatures Great and Small. The first was the BBC's 1978 series, which aired between 1978 and 1990. A new adaptation was produced for the 2020 series.

Darrowby is a composite of Thirsk, Richmond, Leyburn and Middleham (until 2017, Thirsk had a public house, named The Darrowby Inn, to recognise this). Askrigg, in Wensleydale, was used for filming scenes set in Darrowby for the BBC production. In the first three series, the surgery's phone number was "Darrowby 85"; for the final four series it became "Darrowby 385".

The 2020 production primarily used Grassington for filming scenes that took place in the town. This series began being aired in 2020 on Channel 5 and in early 2021 on PBS' Masterpiece in the U.S.

== Amenities ==
The Skeldale House veterinary surgery of central characters Siegfried Farnon and James Herriot is on Trengate. Although the vets are based here, they travel all over the Dales.

Darrowby Church (represented in the BBC series by St Mary and St John's Church, Hardraw) is a few hundred feet from the surgery, beyond the small market cross.

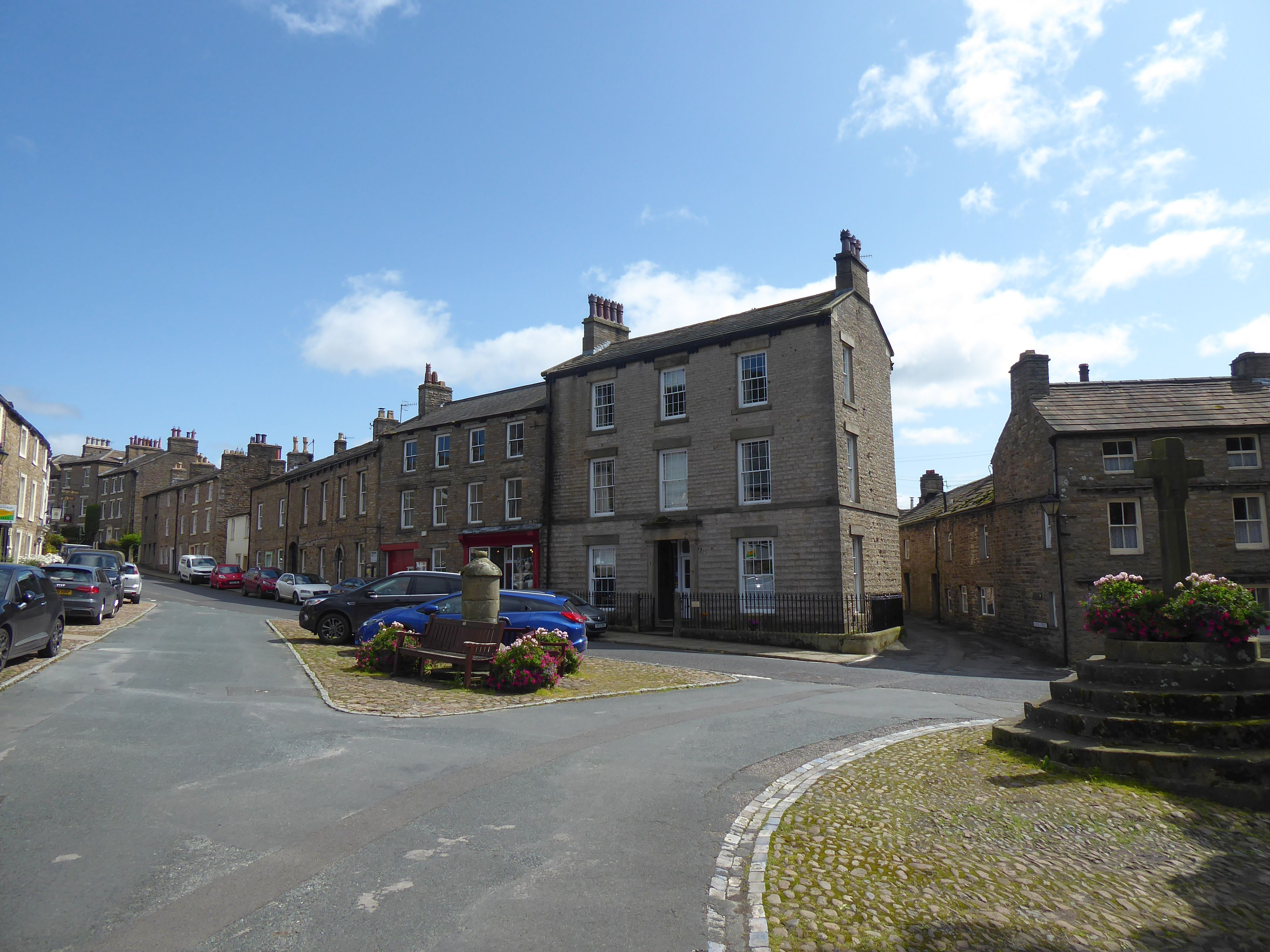
"Skeldale House" in Askrigg, used in the BBC-TV series

The local pub, the Drovers Arms, is on the opposite side of Trengate, a little further up the hill. (The Drovers was made out to be near the church in the early series, as evidenced in the episode "The Name of the Game".)

The Darrowby Hotel and Drovers Arms are among the inns in the village.

The Plaza is the local cinema.

Mr Edwards' carpentry shop is on Market Street.

Bob Howell's Music Shop is where Siegfried buys, as a birthday gift for Tristan from their mother, the acoustic guitar he had been admiring.

The village butcher is A. Bainbridge and Sons.

Sandra's ladies' hair stylist is directly across from the surgery, a few doors up from Roland Partridge's cottage.

The Darrowby constabulary has consisted of P.C. Claude Blenkiron ("Nothing Like Experience" and "Be Prepared"), P.C. Smith ("Golden Lads and Girls"), P.C. Leach ("Pups, Pigs and Pickle"), P.C. Goole (1983 and 1990 Christmas Specials and "Mending Fences") and P.C. Hicks ("Food For Thought").

== Transport ==
The very first programme begins with Herriot travelling on a bus and dismounting in the town square (filmed in Richmond). Subsequently, all visitors to Darrowby arrive at Darrowby bus stop (filmed in Redmire village, Wensleydale).

A railway station was mentioned only once in the first three series, upon Tristan’s arrival, and that was filmed at Leyburn railway station on the Wensleydale Railway. In series 4, the nearest station (and superior city) is called Mannerton, filmed at Goathland railway station on the North Yorkshire Moors Railway. From series 5, those travelling to Darrowby by train alight at neighbouring Rainby Halt; for filming, Finghall Station, a few miles east of Leyburn, was given a makeover as Rainby Halt (its sign saying "Alight here for Darrowby").

== Media ==
The Times is a regular source of news at Skeldale House

The local newspapers are The Darrowby and Houlton Times and the Daily Dispatch.

== Culture ==
Annual events in the village include the Darrowby and Houlton Show (featured in "Judgement Day" and "Ace, King, Queen, Jack") and the Vegetable Show ("Hampered").

== Sport ==
The local cricket team, based in Rainby, is featured in the episode "The Name of the Game", when they play arch-rivals Hedwick. The annual Gentlemen v. Players match can be seen in "Big Fish, Little Fish".

Darrowby Golf Club is on the fell top.

== Gallery ==
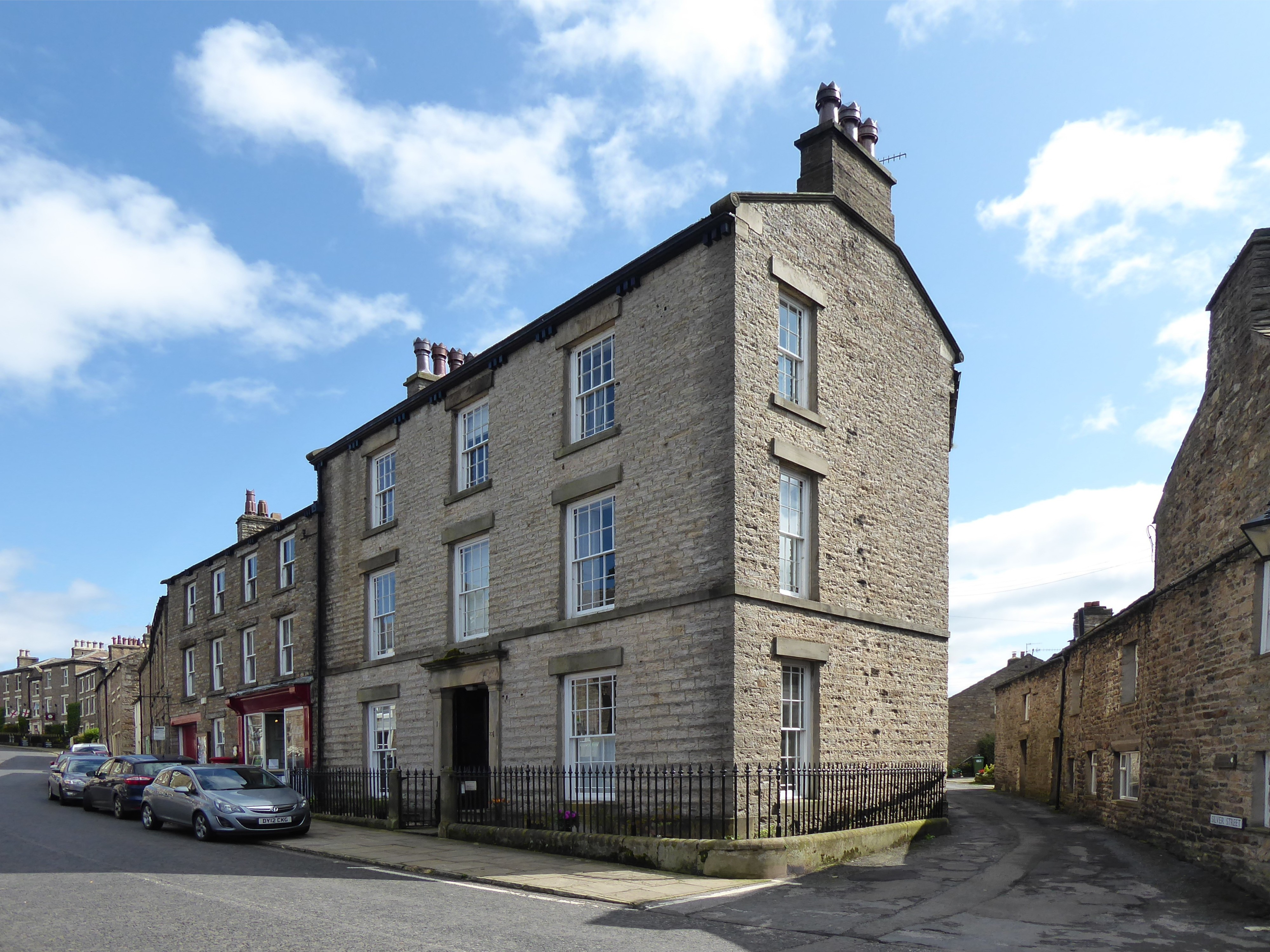
"Skeldale House" in Askrigg

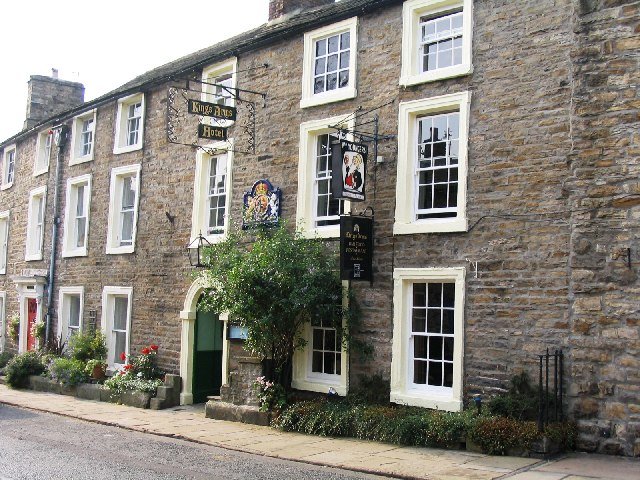
The Kings Arms Hotel in Askrigg, used for "The Drovers Arms" in the BBC-TV series.
