= St Mary and St John's Church, Hardraw =

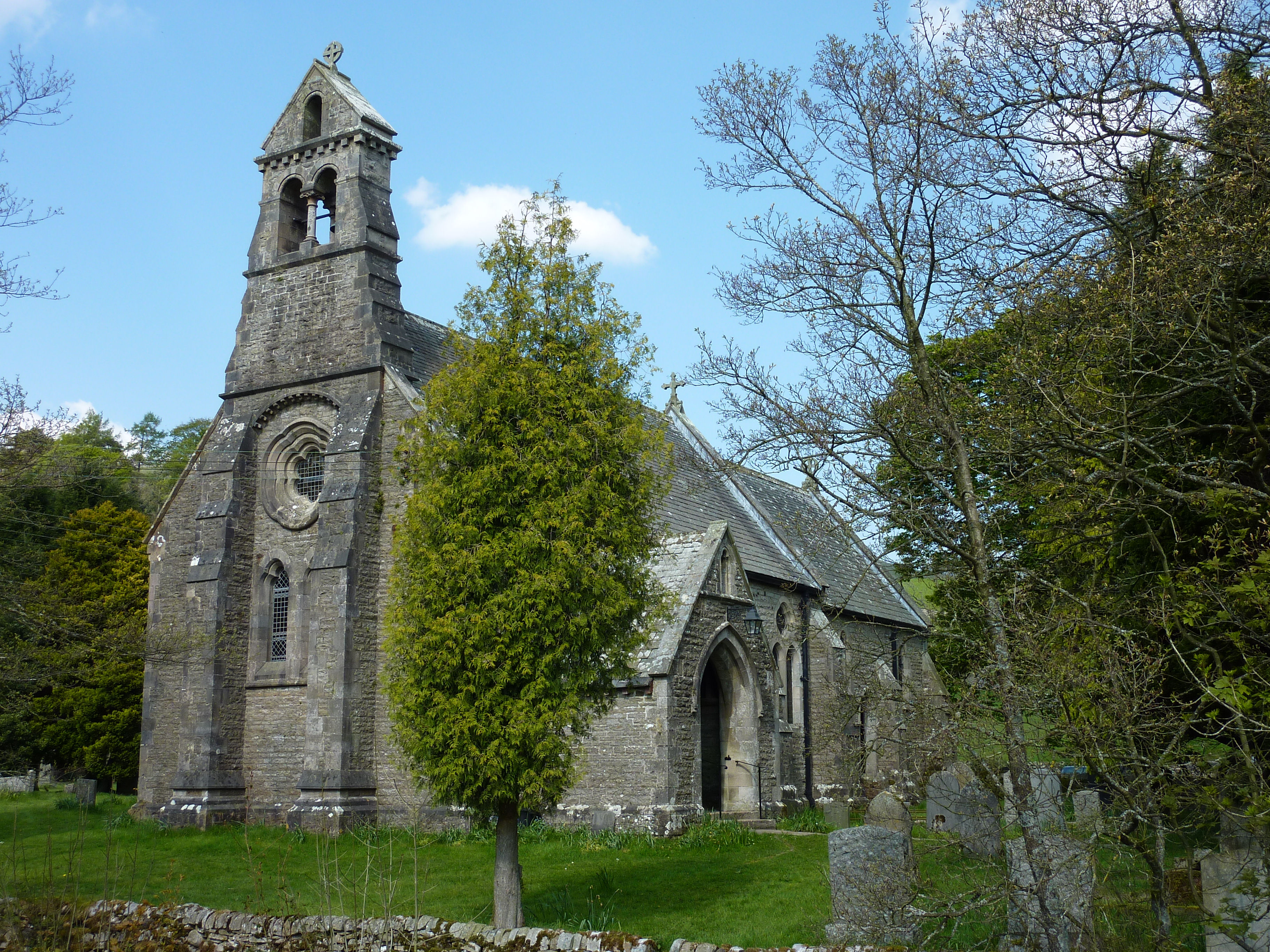
- St Mary and St John's Church, Hardraw
- St Mary and St John's Church, Hardraw
- 54°19′0.96″N 2°12′18.67″W
- OS grid reference: SD 86735 91270
- Location: Hardraw
- Country: England
- Denomination: Church of England
- Website: https://upperwensleydalechurch.org/st-marys-and-st-johns/

History
- Dedication: St Mary the Virgin and St John
- Consecrated: 20 July 1880

Architecture
- Heritage designation: Grade II listed
- Architect: Richard Herbert Carpenter
- Construction cost: £3,000

Administration
- Province: York
- Diocese: Leeds
- Archdeaconry: Richmond and Craven
- Deanery: Wensley
- Parish: Hardraw

St Mary and St John's Church, Hardraw (also Hardrow) is a Grade II listed parish church in the Church of England in Hardraw, North Yorkshire.

== History ==
The church was built in 1879–1880 to designs by the architect Richard Herbert Carpenter and paid for by Edward Montagu-Stuart-Wortley-Mackenzie, 1st Earl of Wharncliffe as a memorial to his brother, the Hon. James Frederick Stuart-Wortley. It was consecrated by the Bishop of Ripon, Rt. Revd. Robert Bickersteth, on 20 July 1880.

It achieved popular recognition when it was featured as Darrowby Church in the British television series All Creatures Great and Small.

== Parish status ==
The church is in a joint parish with

- St Oswald's Church, Askrigg
- St Margaret's Church, Hawes
- St Matthew's Church, Stalling Busk.

== Organ ==
A pipe organ was built by the Vincent Electric Organ company and originally installed in West Witton Methodist Church. A specification of the organ can be found on the National Pipe Organ Register.
