= Cringley House =

Historic building in Askrigg, North Yorkshire

- Skeldale House
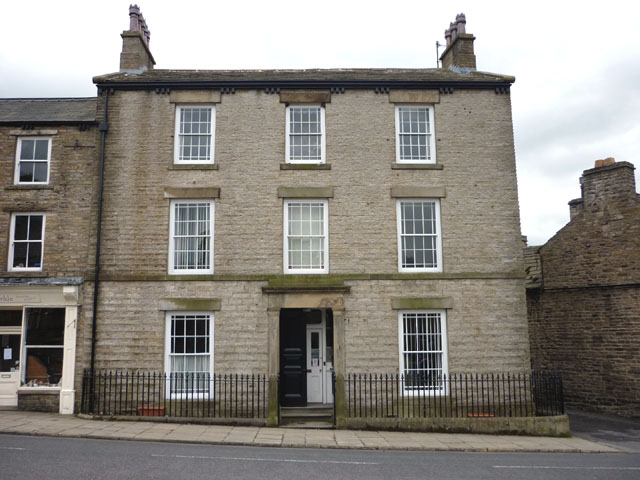
- Cringley House in 2010

- Location within North Yorkshire
- 54.314801°N 2.080971°W
- Location: Askrigg, North Yorkshire, England

History
- Built: circa 1840

Site notes
- Area: Richmondshire
- Current use: Holiday flats

Listed Building – Grade II
- Designated: 9 July 1986
- Reference no.: 1157355

Cringley House (also known as Skeldale House) is an historic building in the English village of Askrigg, North Yorkshire. Standing on the south side of Market Place, it was built in the early-to-mid-19th century, and is now a Grade II listed building. Its railings are also of listed status.

It became known as "Skeldale House" after its use as the exterior of the Darrowby veterinary surgery of Siegfried Farnon and James Herriot in the original BBC television series All Creatures Great and Small. The real Skeldale House, where Herriot worked, is on Kirkgate in Thirsk.

Peter Davison, who played Siegfried Farnon's younger brother and fellow vet Tristan in said television series, recalled its owners in the 1970s and 1980s: "[It was] owned by Olive Turner and her husband Charles, who welcomed us with open arms from the first day of filming. Although we never shot any interior scenes there, it was often used for make-up and costume and, while relaxing between takes, they would make us tea and coffee and show us pictures of their children. The couple even appeared as extras in a couple of scenes."

An early occupant, in the 1920s was Billy Banks, whose family ran the grocer's shop and the animal feed store in Askrigg. In the late 20th century and early 21st, it was used as a care home and a housing association.

The building now offers seven luxury holiday apartments and studios, called Skeldale House by Maison Parfaite.

== Gallery ==
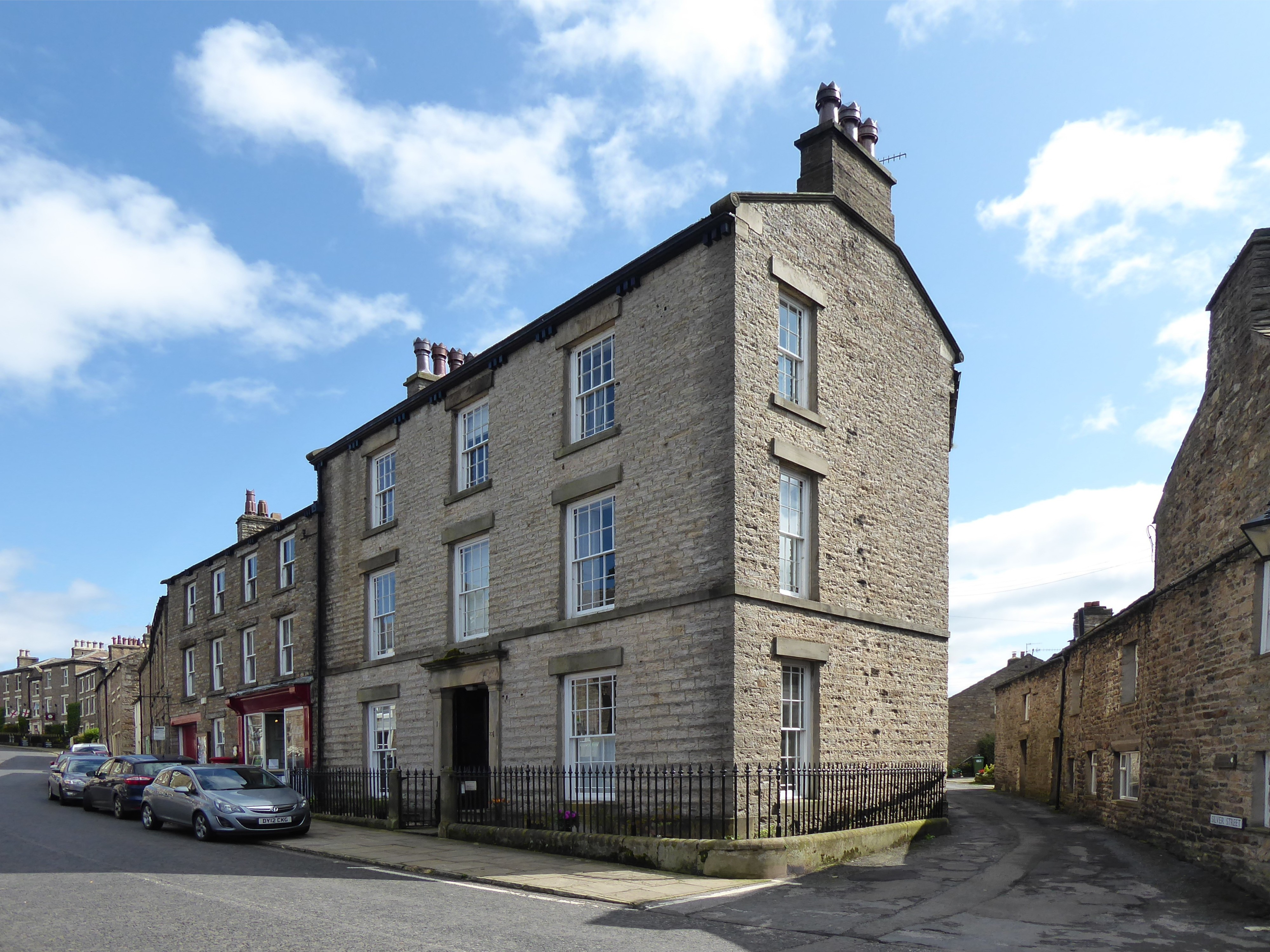
The western side of the building, and Silver Street, in 2019

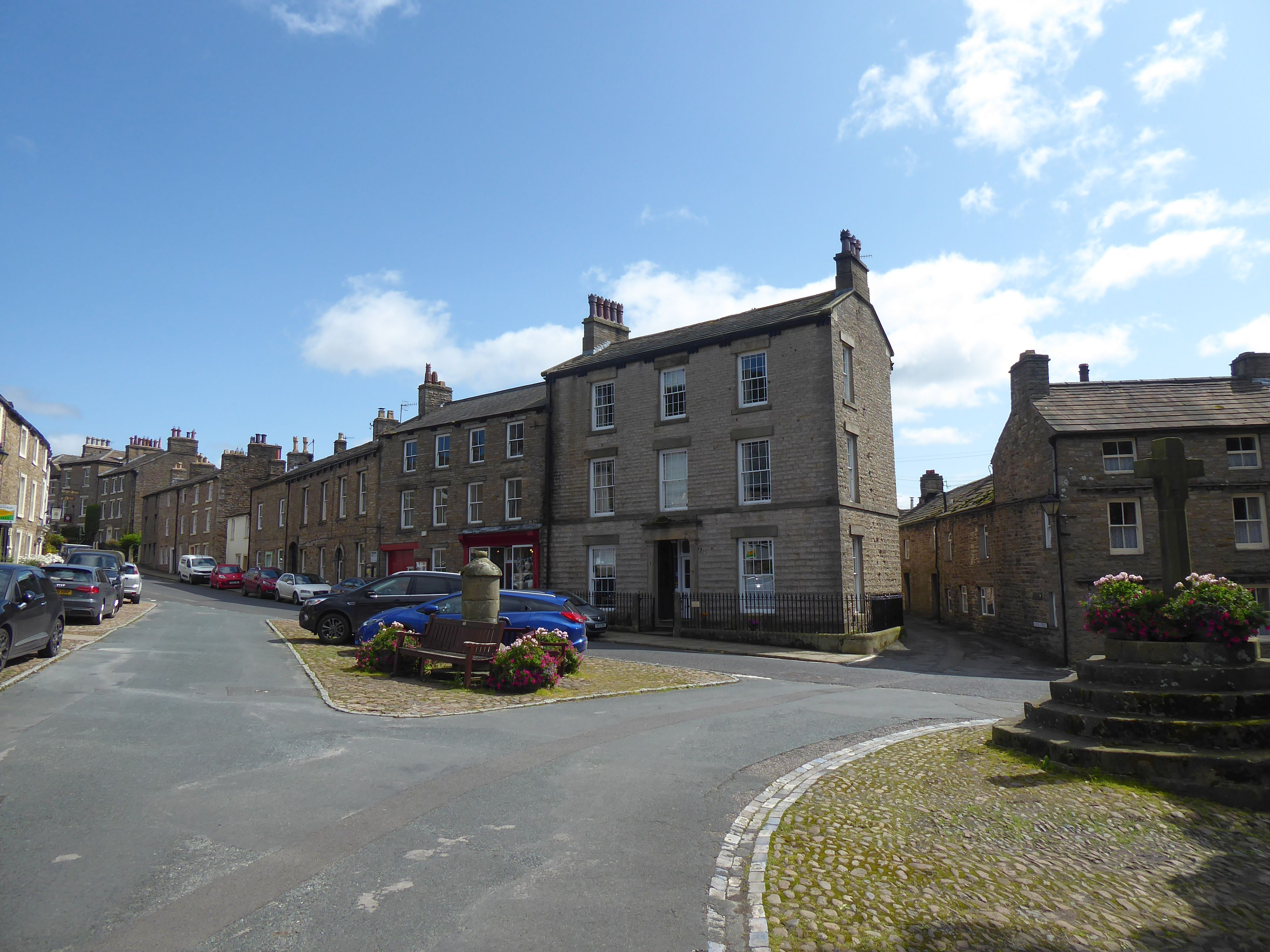
Viewed from Market Place

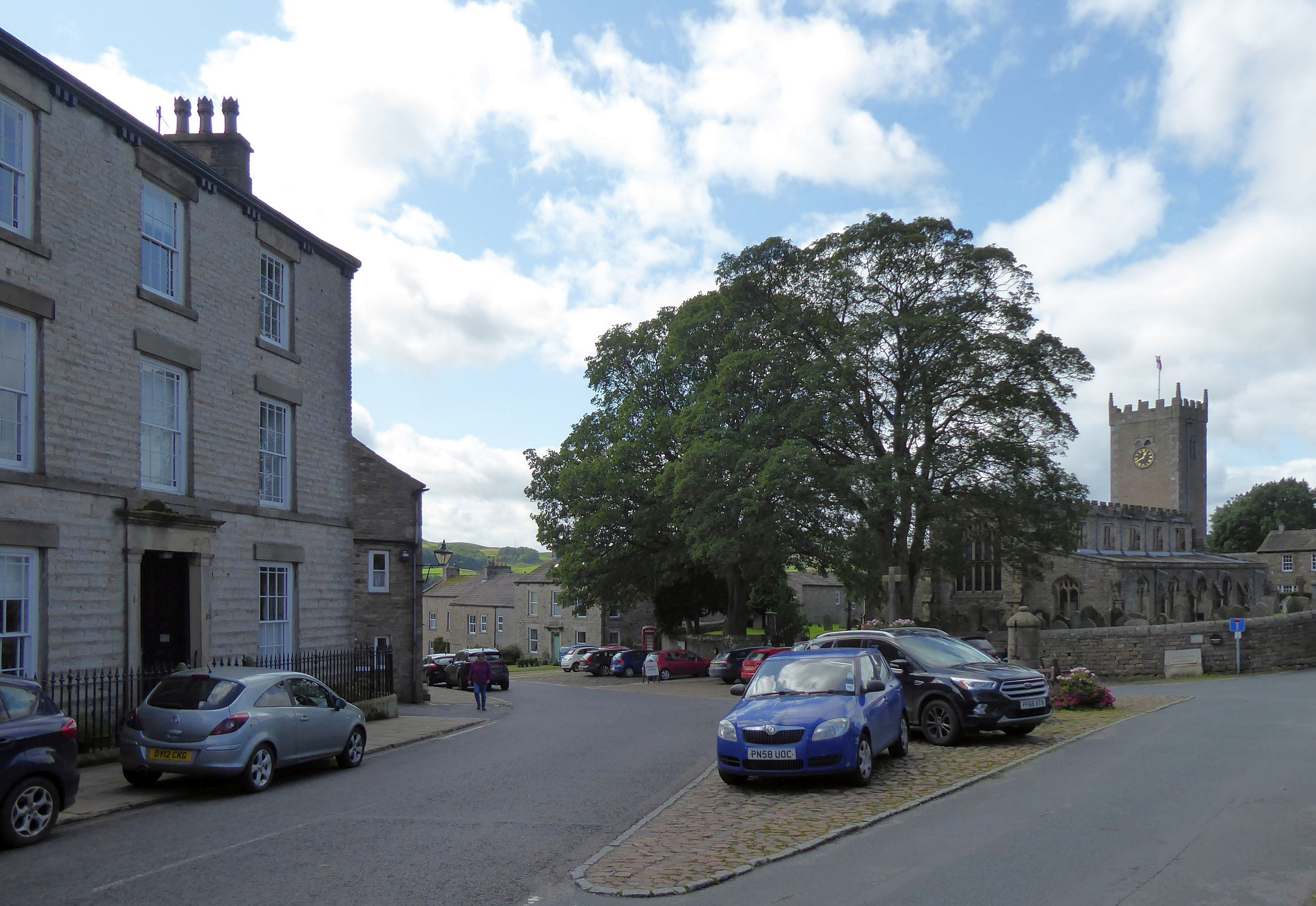
Looking west to St Oswald's Church

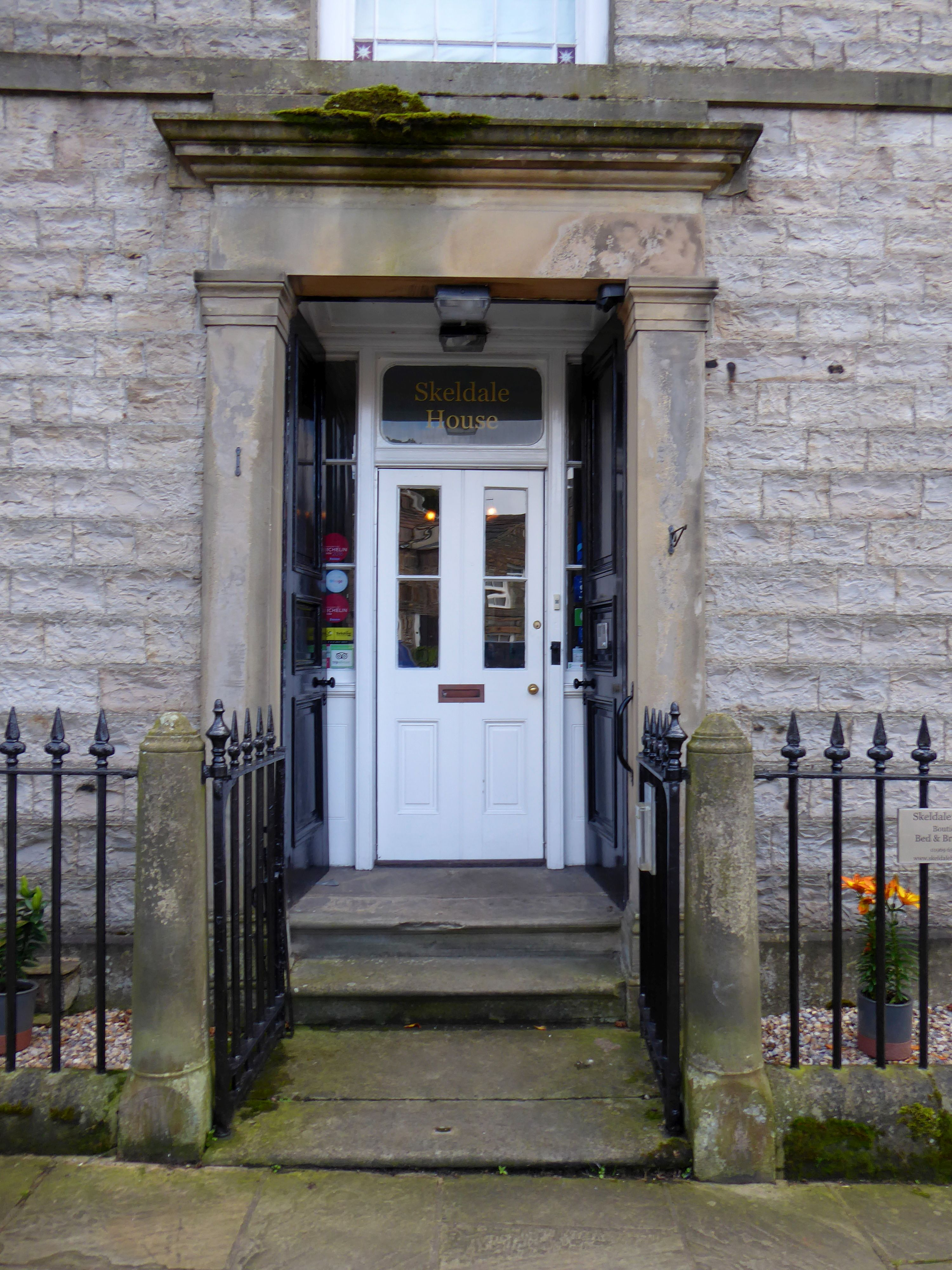
Main entrance, with a nod to its appearance in All Creatures Great and Small visible above the door

== See also ==
- Listed buildings in North Yorkshire
