= Woodhall, North Yorkshire =

Hamlet in North Yorkshire, England

Coordinates: 54.3074°N 2.0362°W

Woodhall
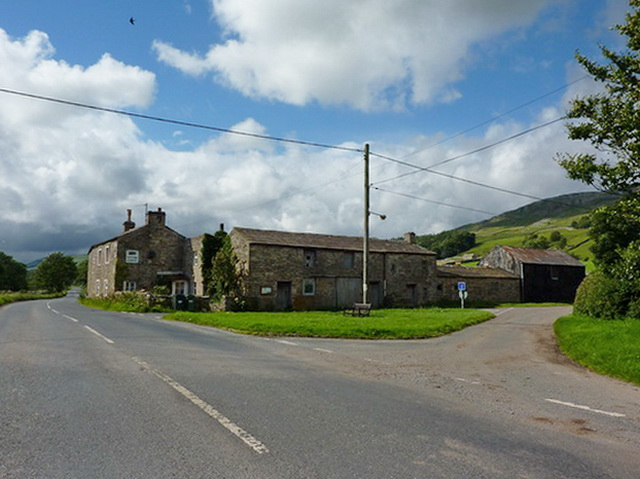
- Road junction in Woodhall

- Location within North Yorkshire
- OS grid reference: SD977902
- Civil parish: Askrigg
- Unitary authority: North Yorkshire
- Ceremonial county: North Yorkshire
- Region: Yorkshire and the Humber
- Country: England
- Sovereign state: United Kingdom
- Post town: Leyburn
- Postcode district: DL8
- Police: North Yorkshire
- Fire: North Yorkshire
- Ambulance: Yorkshire
- UK Parliament: Richmond and Northallerton

Woodhall is a small hamlet in Wensleydale, North Yorkshire, England. It is about 2 miles (3 km) away from Askrigg and 3 miles (5 km) north west of Aysgarth. From 1974 to 2023 it was part of the district of Richmondshire, it is now administered by the unitary North Yorkshire Council.

Woodhall consists of a garage (Aldersons), three farms and 22 family homes.
