= St Oswald's Church, Askrigg =

Church in North Yorkshire, England

St Oswald’s Church, Askrigg
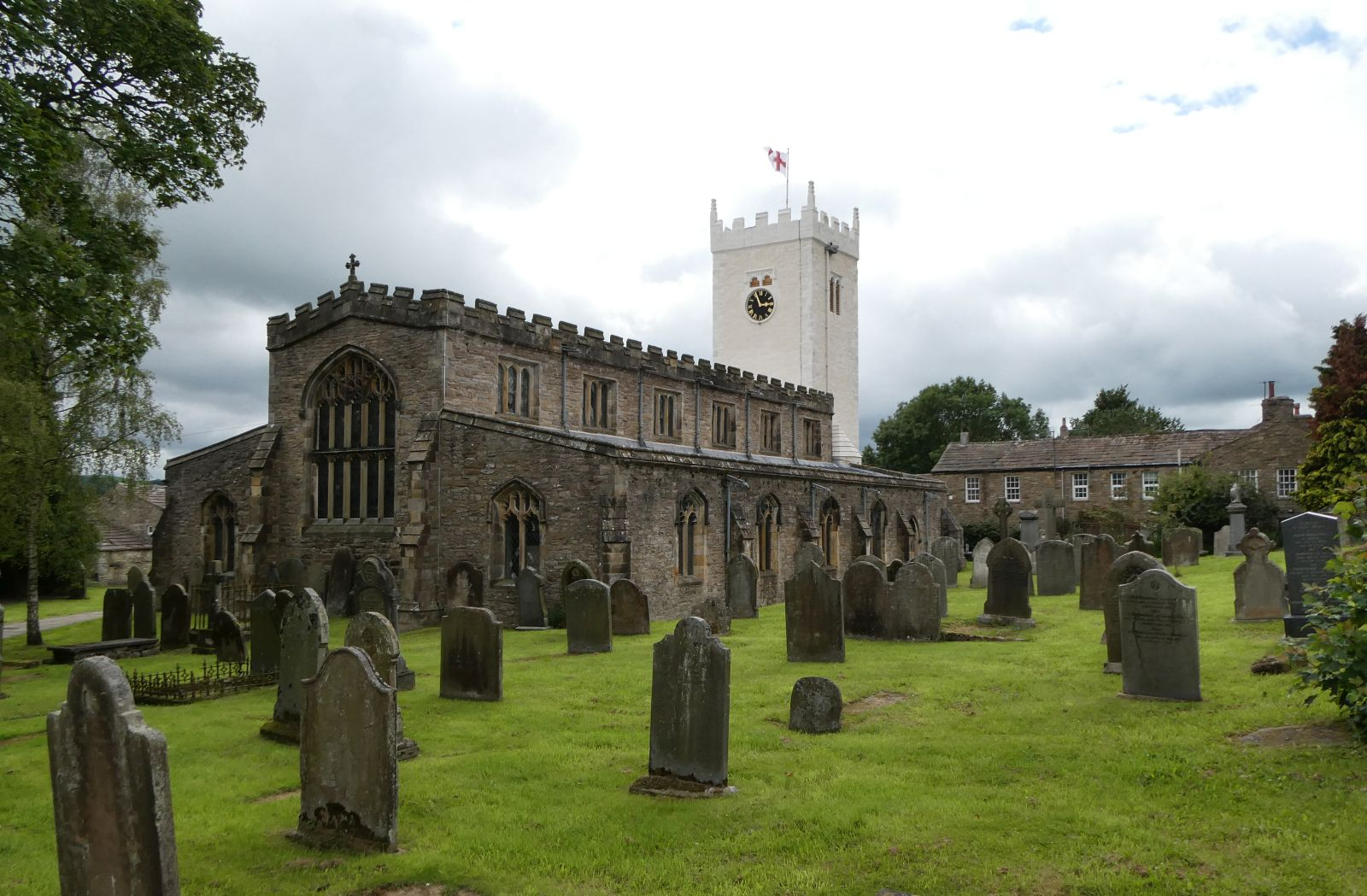
- St Oswald’s Church, Askrigg
- 54°18′52.42″N 2°04′58.7″W
- OS grid reference: SD 94759 91015
- Location: Askrigg
- Country: England
- Denomination: Church of England
- Website: https://upperwensleydalechurch.org/st-oswalds/

History
- Dedication: St Oswald

Architecture
- Heritage designation: Grade I listed

Administration
- Diocese: Diocese of Leeds
- Archdeaconry: Richmond and Craven
- Deanery: Wensley
- Parish: Askrigg

St Oswald's Church is a Grade I listed parish church in the Church of England in Askrigg, North Yorkshire.

== History ==
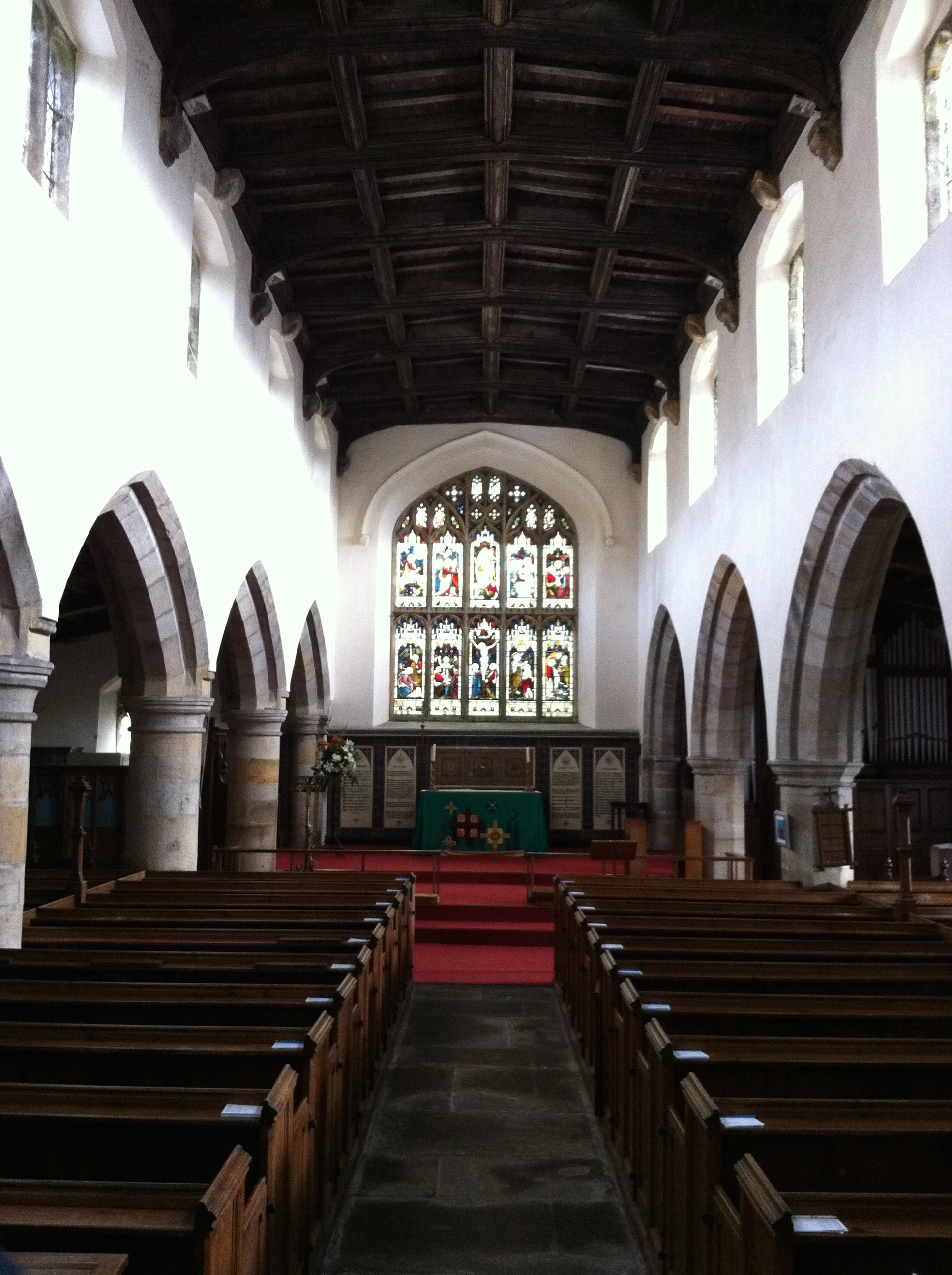
The nave and chancel

The church dates largely from the 15th century, but there is some earlier work. It is of stone construction in the Perpendicular style, consisting of a five-bay chancel and nave, aisles, south porch and an embattled western tower with pinnacles containing a clock and six bells.

By the mid nineteenth century, the foundations of the nave piers had given way, so the church was restored between 1852 and 1854 at a cost of £1,500. The body and north aisle of the church were rebuilt. The roof of the nave which dated from the 15th century was repaired. A western gallery which blocked up the tower was removed, and a staircase giving better access to the tower was inserted. It reopened for worship by Charles Longley, Bishop of Ripon, on 31 October 1854.

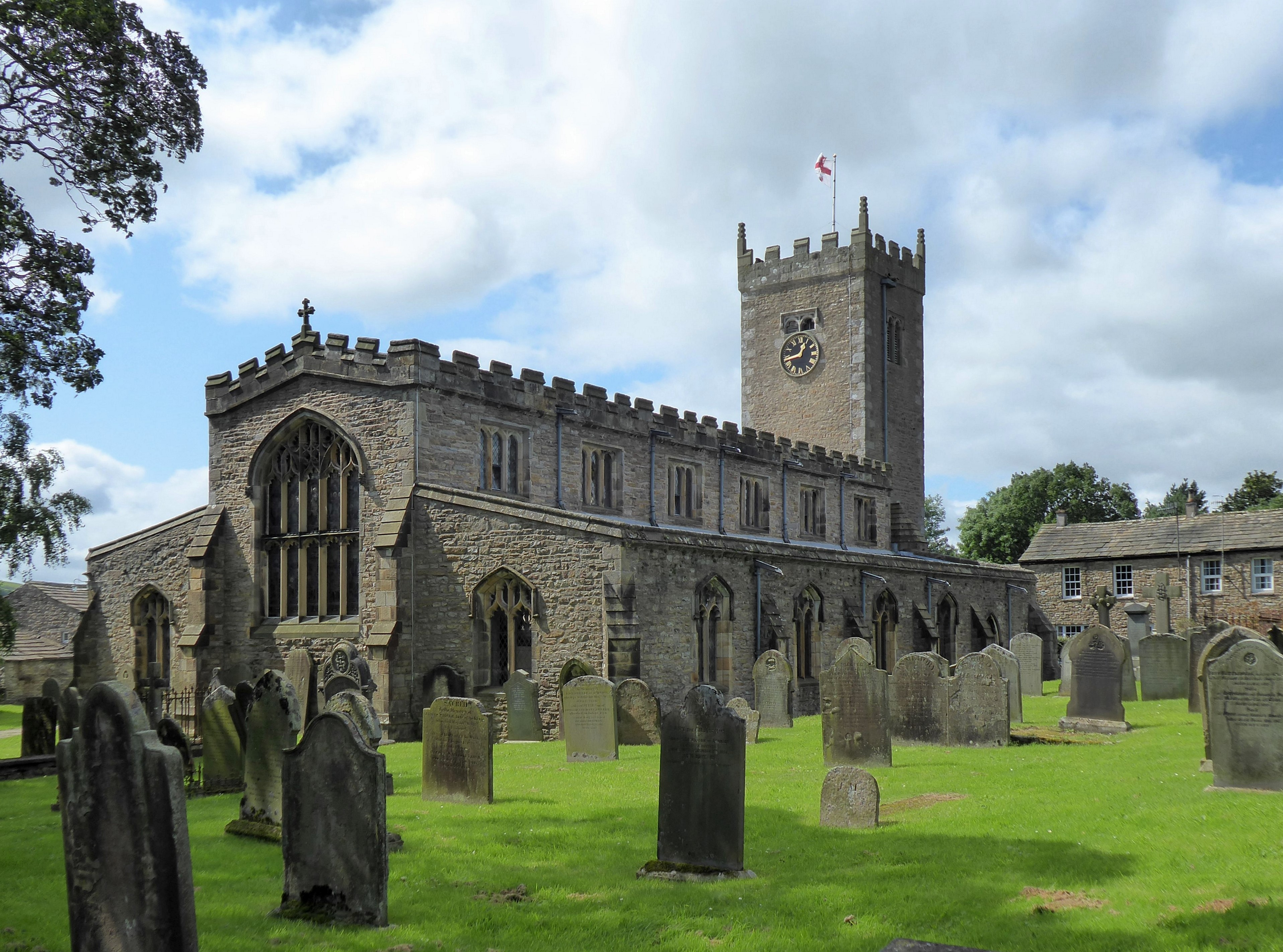
The Church in 2019

=== Tower restoration (2025) ===
In 2025, the church’s western tower underwent a major programme of conservation to address persistent damp, decay and structural concerns that had begun to affect both the masonry and the functioning of the bells. Following consultation with conservation specialists and historical research, a traditional lime render was applied to the exterior of the tower.

The render was produced using historic techniques and materials, including the incorporation of animal hair, in order to replicate earlier construction methods. Evidence indicated that the tower had originally been limewashed, a finish likely dating from the medieval or early post-medieval period, which was stripped from the building during the 19th-century Victorian restoration works. The works reinstated a protective coating consistent with the tower’s earlier historic appearance, returning it closer to its pre-Victorian character.

The cream-coloured finish of the restored tower attracted a range of responses from local residents, with some expressing reservations about its visual impact while others supported the historically informed approach and noted improvements in the building’s condition. The appearance is expected to weather over time to a more subdued tone.

The project was recognised at a national level for its conservation approach, receiving the Ecclesiastical Architects and Surveyors Association’s King of Prussia Gold Medal in 2026, awarded for innovative and high-quality church repair work. The restoration has also been associated with increased visitor interest in the church and the village.

== Parish status ==
The church is in a joint parish with

- St Margaret's Church, Hawes
- St Mary and St John's Church, Hardraw
- St Matthew's Church, Stalling Busk

== Bells ==
The bells were recast in 1897 by John Warner & Sons with the tenor weighing 10cwt, 1qtr and 25lb. Three original bells, said to date from c. 1657 were recast, and three new ones were obtained. The bells were rededicated on 11 November 1897 by John Pulleine, Bishop of Richmond. The bells were rehung in a new frame by Eayre and Smith in 1992.

== Clock ==
The first clock was installed in the tower in 1749. This was replaced in 1854. The current clock built by Potts of Leeds was dedicated on 30 October 1902 as the Coronation Clock.

== Organ ==
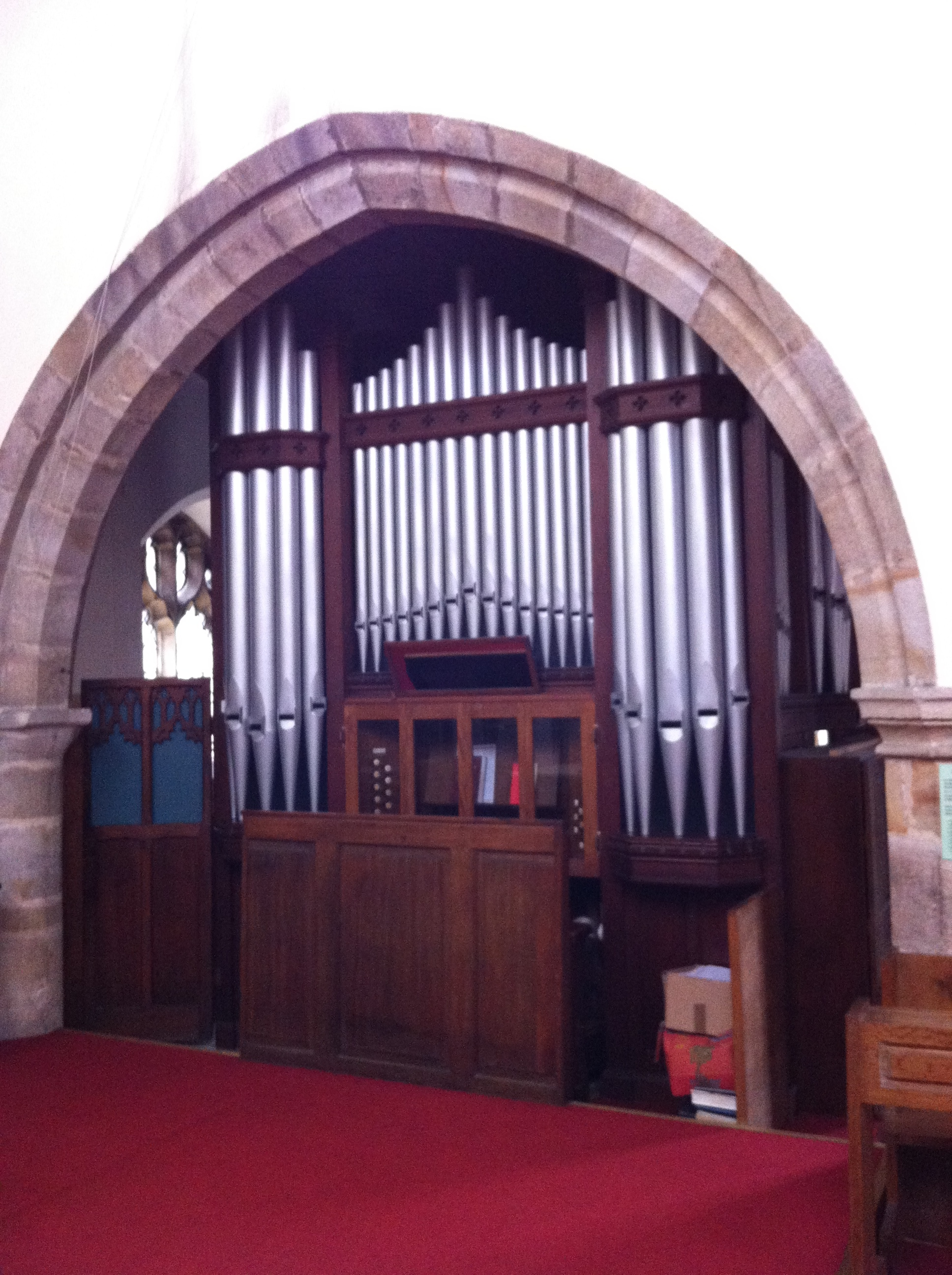
The organ

The church has two manual pipe organ dating from 1869 by Forster and Andrews. A specification of the organ can be found on the National Pipe Organ Register.

== See also ==
- Grade I listed buildings in North Yorkshire (district)
- Listed buildings in Askrigg
