= Redmire =

Village and civil parish in North Yorkshire, England

Coordinates: 54°18′59″N 1°55′51″W

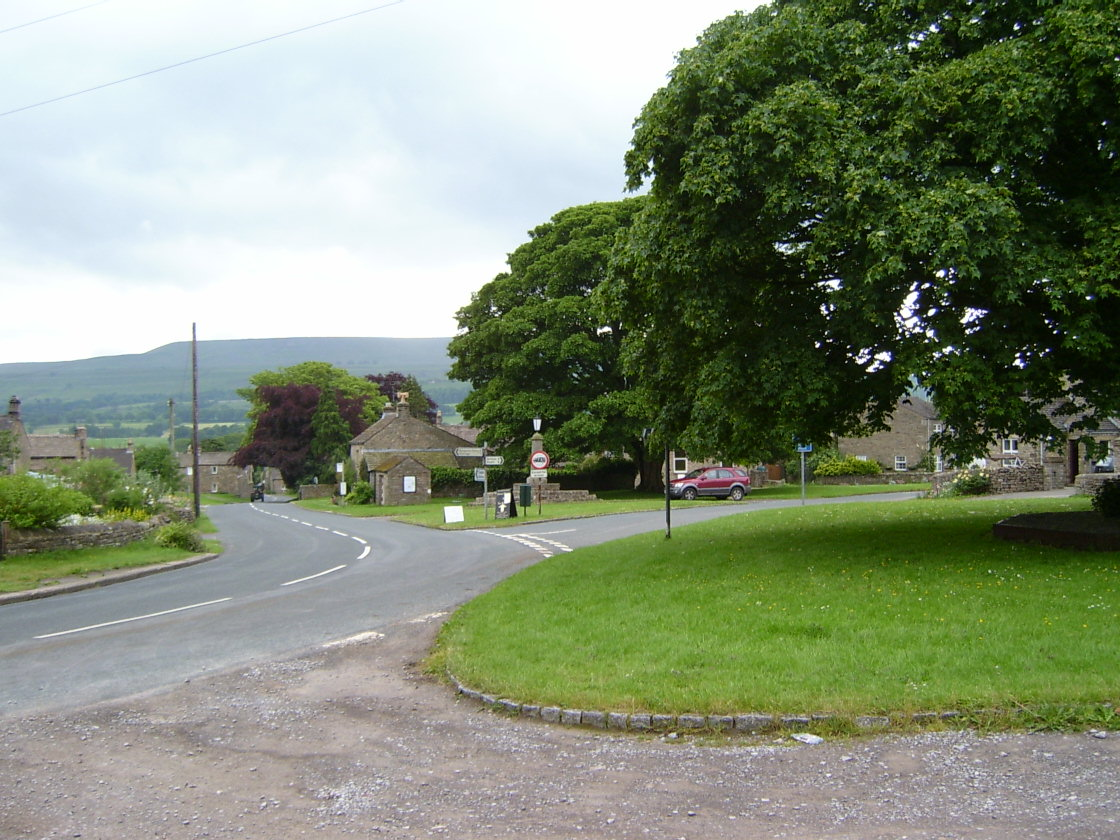
- Redmire

- Location within North Yorkshire
- Population: 384 (including Castle Bolton with East and west Bolton 2011 census)
- OS grid reference: SE044912
- Unitary authority: North Yorkshire
- Ceremonial county: North Yorkshire
- Region: Yorkshire and the Humber
- Country: England
- Sovereign state: United Kingdom
- Post town: Leyburn
- Postcode district: DL8
- Police: North Yorkshire
- Fire: North Yorkshire
- Ambulance: Yorkshire

Redmire is a village and civil parish in North Yorkshire, England. It is about 4 miles (6.4 km) west of Leyburn in Wensleydale in the Yorkshire Dales.

From 1974 to 2023 it was part of the district of Richmondshire, it is now administered by the unitary North Yorkshire Council.

The name Redmire derives from the Old English hrēodmere meaning 'reed mere'.

== Transport ==
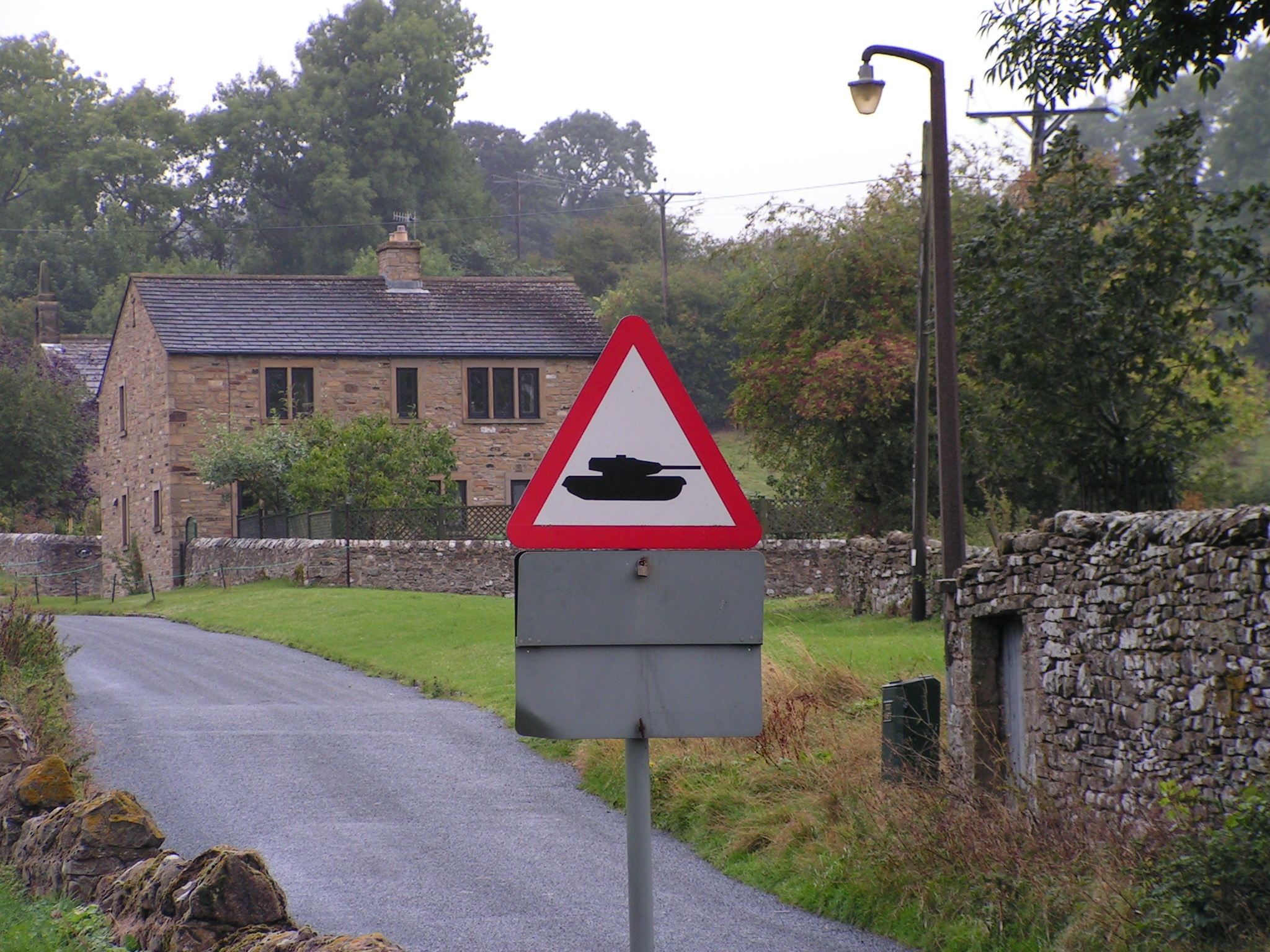
Sign warning of slow moving military vehicles in Redmire

Redmire is the current western terminus of the Wensleydale Railway. The Wensleydale Railway is a heritage railway and regular passenger services operate between Leeming Bar and Redmire. The Ministry of Defence also occasionally operates trains along the railway to transport armoured vehicles from bases in the south to the Catterick military area via Redmire railway station.

== Popular culture ==
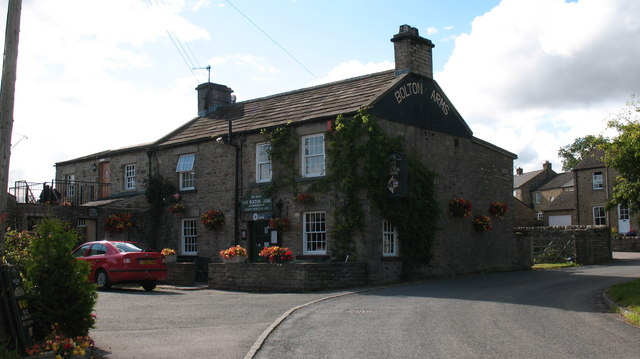
The Bolton Arms, on Hargill Lane

The village was featured in the BBC television series All Creatures Great and Small, in the episode "Puppy Love", as the location of Darrowby bus stop. Also, the village pub, Redmire Village Pub, then called the Bolton Arms, featured in the episode "Beauty of the Beast".

Redmire was also used as the location for the eponymous temple in 28 Years Later: The Bone Temple and its prequel.

== See also ==
- Listed buildings in Redmire
