= Askrigg =

Village and civil parish in North Yorkshire, England

Coordinates: 54.315°N 02.081°W

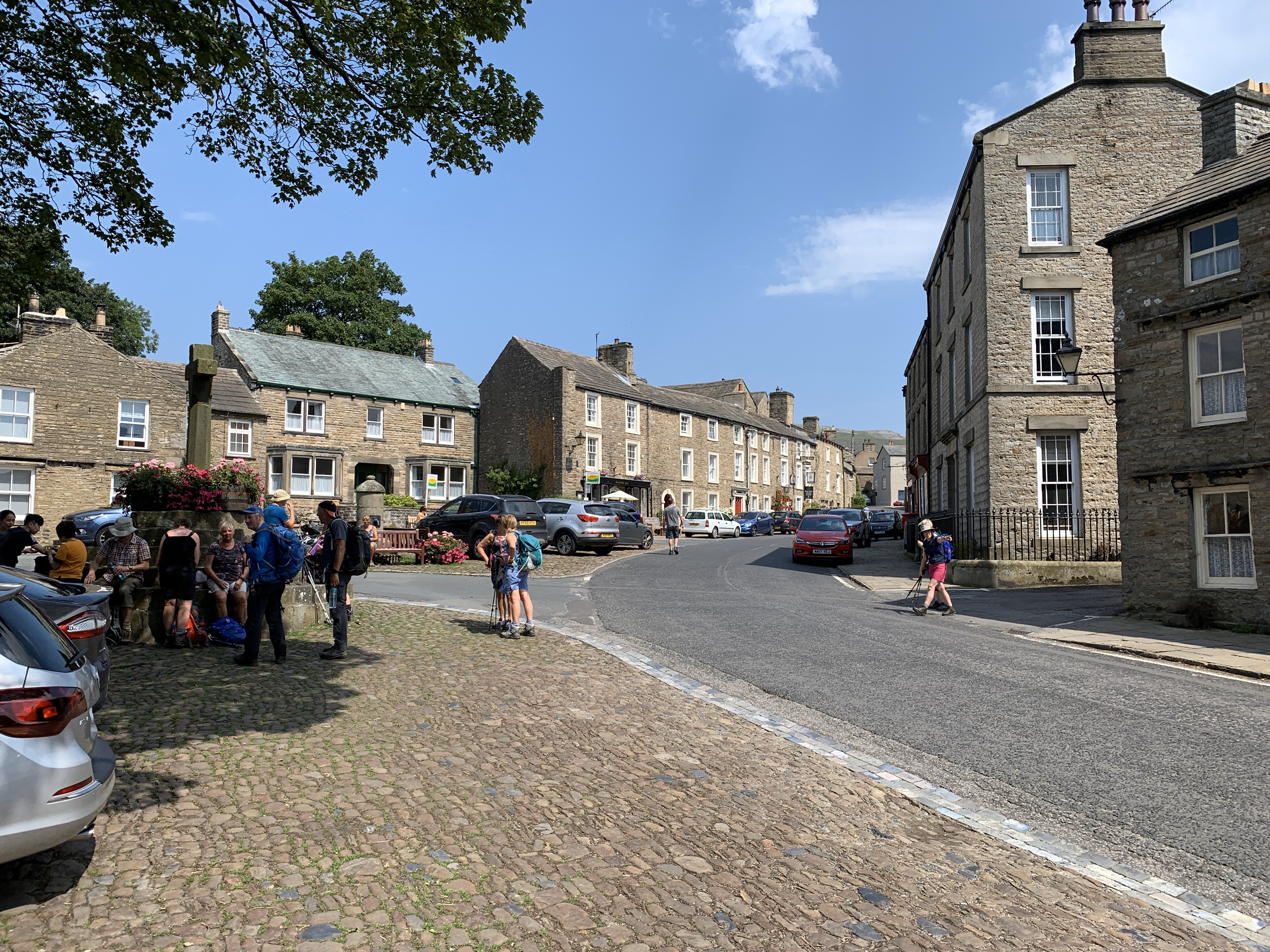
- Askrigg

- Location within North Yorkshire
- Population: 563 (2011)
- OS grid reference: SD948910
- Unitary authority: North Yorkshire
- Ceremonial county: North Yorkshire
- Region: Yorkshire and the Humber
- Country: England
- Sovereign state: United Kingdom
- Post town: LEYBURN
- Postcode district: DL8
- Dialling code: 01969
- Police: North Yorkshire
- Fire: North Yorkshire
- Ambulance: Yorkshire
- UK Parliament: Richmond and Northallerton

Askrigg is a small village and civil parish in Wensleydale in the Yorkshire Dales National Park, part of the county of North Yorkshire, England. The village and its parish are located in Upper Wensleydale, 12 miles (19 km) west of Leyburn, and 5 miles (8 km) east of Hawes. It is 31.4 miles (50.5 km) west of the county town of Northallerton.

== History ==
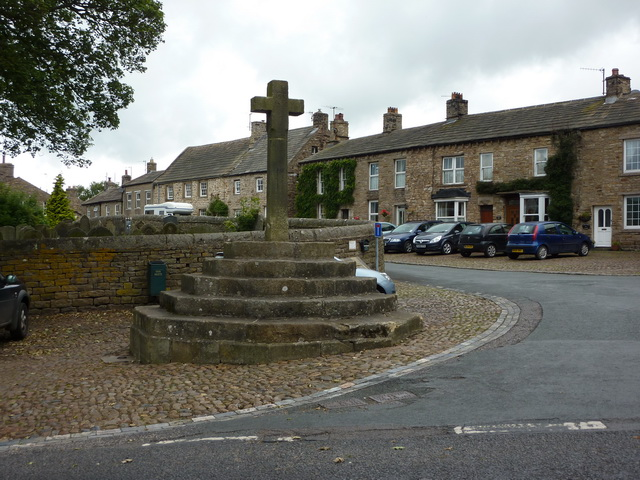
Askrigg market cross

The village is mentioned in the Domesday Book as Ascric. At the time of the Norman invasion the manor was held by Arnketil. Afterwards, the lands were owned on behalf of the Crown by Count Alan of Brittany, who granted then lordship of the manor to Gospatric, son of Arnketil. By 1251, the manor had come to the Fitz Hugh family who were also lords of Ravenworth and stayed with them until the 16th century. In the early 16th century, the manor became the possession of Sir Thomas Parr. His son William died without issue in 1571 when it became the property of the Crown. In 1664 the manorial rights were leased from the Crown by the Metcalfe family.

The name Askrigg is of Old Norse origin, consisting of the combination of askr (ash tree) and hryggr (ridge), meaning the ridge where ash trees grew, denoting the existence of Viking settlers and their farming. The oldest settlement probably dates back to the Iron Age.

The village remained of little commercial importance throughout the 13th and 14th centuries when Wensleydale was extensively used for sheep grazing by the Cistercian monks, who became prosperous on the profits of the wool trade. In the 15th and 16th centuries, however, secular wealth became important in the dale following the border conflicts in the north and the Dissolution of the Monasteries throughout the country.

Askrigg was granted a Charter by Elizabeth I in 1587 for the holding of a weekly market on Thursday, and of fairs in spring, summer and autumn. Askrigg's prosperity peaked in the 18th century when trade in textiles and knitting was most lucrative and the village supported many craftsmen and gained a reputation for clockmaking. The earliest mention of Askrigg clockmakers being a Quaker named John Ogden, who moved to Askrigg in 1680 and manufactured his clocks there until 1720. He was succeeded by Mark Metcalfe (1687–1776) and Christopher Caygill (1747–1803). Another well-known clockmaker was James Pratt (1787–1850). All three had sons who were also clockmakers. Two 19th-century clockmakers were John Stancliffe and John Skidmore.

Askrigg was the home of the Wensleydale Metcalfe family who lived at nearby Nappa Hall. Mary, Queen of Scots, was once imprisoned in the house, possibly before she was moved to Castle Bolton further down the dale.

Askrigg became a junction of two turnpikes; the first, the Richmond to Lancaster Turnpike, was sent through the village in 1751. A diversion through the then hamlet of Hawes in 1795, meant that the market at Askrigg fell into decline as Hawes became the last coaching stop in Wensleydale before going over into Ribblesdale. In 1761, the turnpike to Sedbergh was started.

Askrigg market cross was erected in 1830, while a stone pump and an iron bull ring are set into the cobbles. The bull ring dates from the 18th century and earlier, when bulls would be tied here and then attacked or baited with dogs. A local historian wrote that "it used to be a custom in Askrigg for a man who wanted to fight to go and turn the bull ring over; if another man was feeling the same, he came and turned it back and they had a fight."

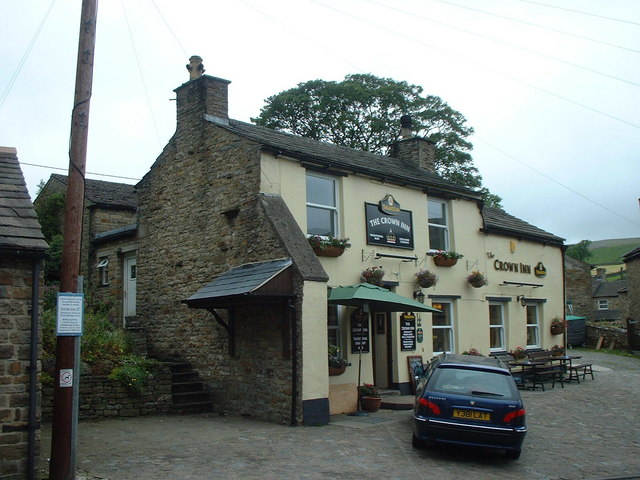
Crown Inn, Askrigg

One of the local pubs, the Crown Inn, has been known under this name since the 1850s, and there has been an inn at this site since the late 18th century. The other pub, the Kings Arms Hotel, was built in 1767 as a coaching inn by John Pratt, a local who had made a fortune as a jockey. Pratt was a racehorse breeder and master of the Askrigg Harriers during the 18th century. He kept his hunters and pack of hounds in a yard behind the house he built on Askrigg's main street in 1767. The kennels and stabling date to the late 18th or early 19th century. The kennels had a semi-circular enclosure attached and the long row of stabling lay beyond. Pratt's hunters were ridden in and out of his land through Robinson's Gateways on the main street. The site has now been restored to provide holiday accommodation.

The village once had a railway station that was part of the Hawes Branch of the North Eastern Railway from its opening in 1878 to its closure in April 1954. The Wensleydale Railway Association has plans to rebuild the railway from Northallerton (from its current western terminus at Redmire) to Garsdale including the re-opening of the station in the village. This had been planned for since 2005, but due to spiralling costs, the railway is focussing on reaching only Castle Bolton initially from Redmire.

== Governance ==
The village lies within the Richmond and Northallerton UK Parliament constituency. From 1974 to 2023 it was part of the district of Richmondshire, it is now administered by the unitary North Yorkshire Council. The local Parish Council has six councillors.

The civil parish shares a grouped parish council with the civil parish of Low Abbotside, known as Askrigg & Low Abbotside Parish Council.

== Geography ==
The civil parish area covers the village itself and several small hamlets including Newbiggin and Woodhall.

The River Ure forms the southern boundary of the parish and is fed by Grange Beck, Paddock Beck and Newbiggin Beck in the parish. The highest point in the parish is at Cogill Head Hags at around 630 feet (190 m). The nearest settlements to the village are Bainbridge 1.1 miles (1.8 km) to the south-west and Thornton Rust 2 miles (3.2 km) to the south-east.

== Demography ==
The census figures for Askrigg include the population of Low Abbotside. In 2012 the population of Askrigg parish alone was estimated at 450, compared with 110 in Low Abbotside.

Population
Year	1881	1891	1901	1911	1921	1931	1951	1961	2001	2011
Total	624	552	462	470	481	488	414	370	510	563

=== 2001 census ===
The 2001 UK census showed that the population was split 50% male to 50% female. The religious constituency was made of 83.3% Christian and the rest stating no religion or not stating at all. The ethnic make-up was 99.2% White British and 0.8% White other. There were 305 dwellings.

=== 2011 census ===
The 2011 UK census showed that the population was split 50% male to 50% female. The religious constituency was made of 69.4% Christian, 0.2% Jewish, 0.5% Buddhist and the rest stating no religion or not stating at all. The ethnic make-up was 97.3% White British, 1.0% White Other, 0.2% Mixed ethnic, 0.2% British Asian, 0.2% British Black and 0.2% Other ethnic. There were 356 dwellings.

== Community and culture ==
Education in the village is provided at Askrigg VC Primary School. The school occupies part of the building formerly housing the Yorebridge Grammar School. Pupils would receive secondary education at The Wensleydale School and Sixth Form in Leyburn.

At the western end of the village is the Yorebridge Sports Development Association. It has a multi use games area that can be used for Football, Tennis, Basketball and Netball, and there is also a Gymnasium with a Fitness Centre. At Low Mill there is an Outdoor Activities Centre established in 1976. Askrigg has three pubs, a village bakery with delicatessen, two tea rooms, a village shop, and newsagents. There are also a number of Bed & Breakfast establishments.

The village has become notable through its role as the fictional Darrowby in the 1978-1990 BBC TV series All Creatures Great and Small. Cringley House, which doubled as the exterior of Skeldale House in the series, is now a bed and breakfast. (The 2020 Channel 5 series was filmed in Grassington, Wharfedale.)

== Notable people ==
- John Terry (1771–1844), an early settler and pioneer farmer in New Norfolk, Tasmania
- James Dinsdale (1848–1928), a member of the Wisconsin State Assembly.
- Barry Jackson (1938–2021), footballer who played 482 games with York City F.C.
- Howard Liddell (1945–2013), architect, pioneered sustainable development and passive housing

== Gallery ==
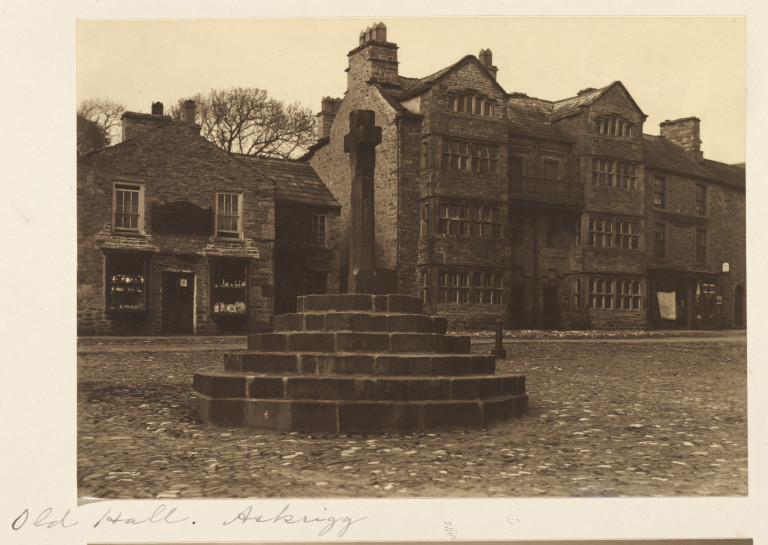
Old hall and stone cross, 1897

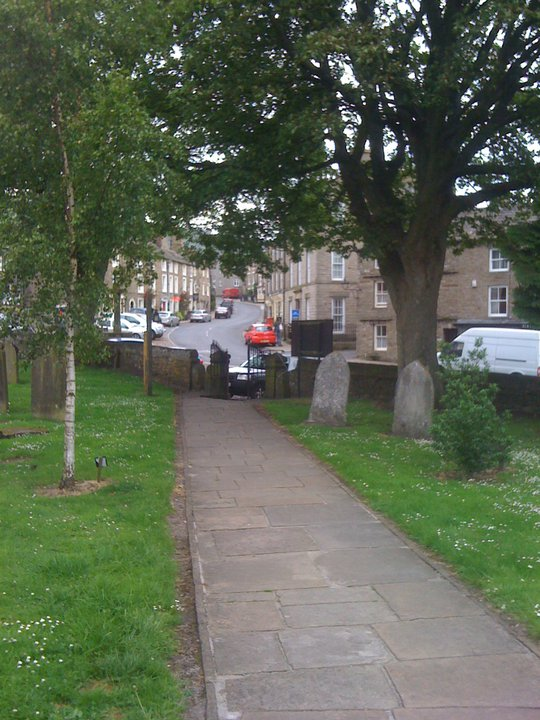
Askrigg's Main Street, viewed from the graveyard of St. Oswald's Church in 2011

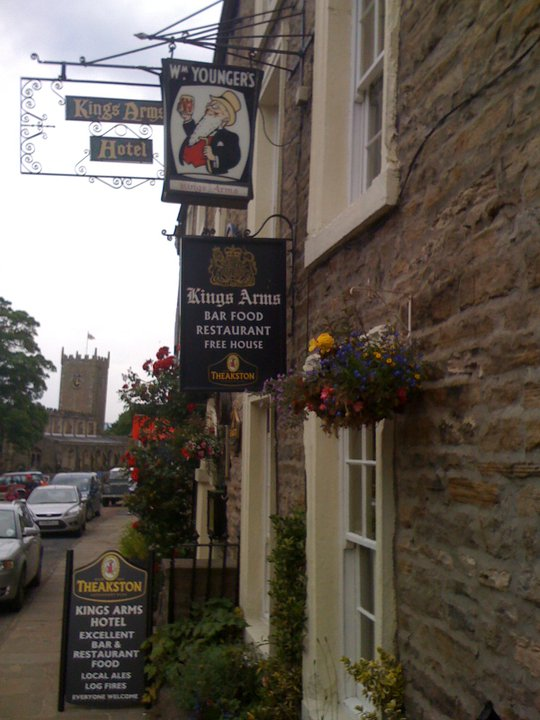
Kings Arms Hotel doubled as the Drover's Arms in the television series All Creatures Great and Small

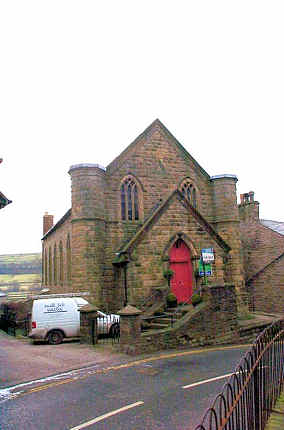
Wesleyan Chapel (now a private dwelling)

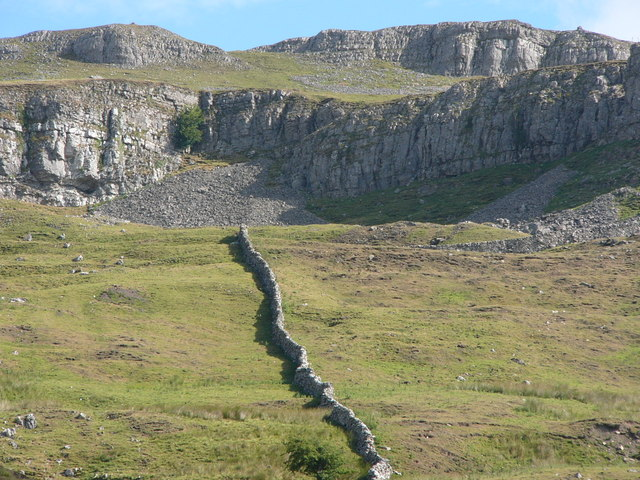
Ellerkin Scar

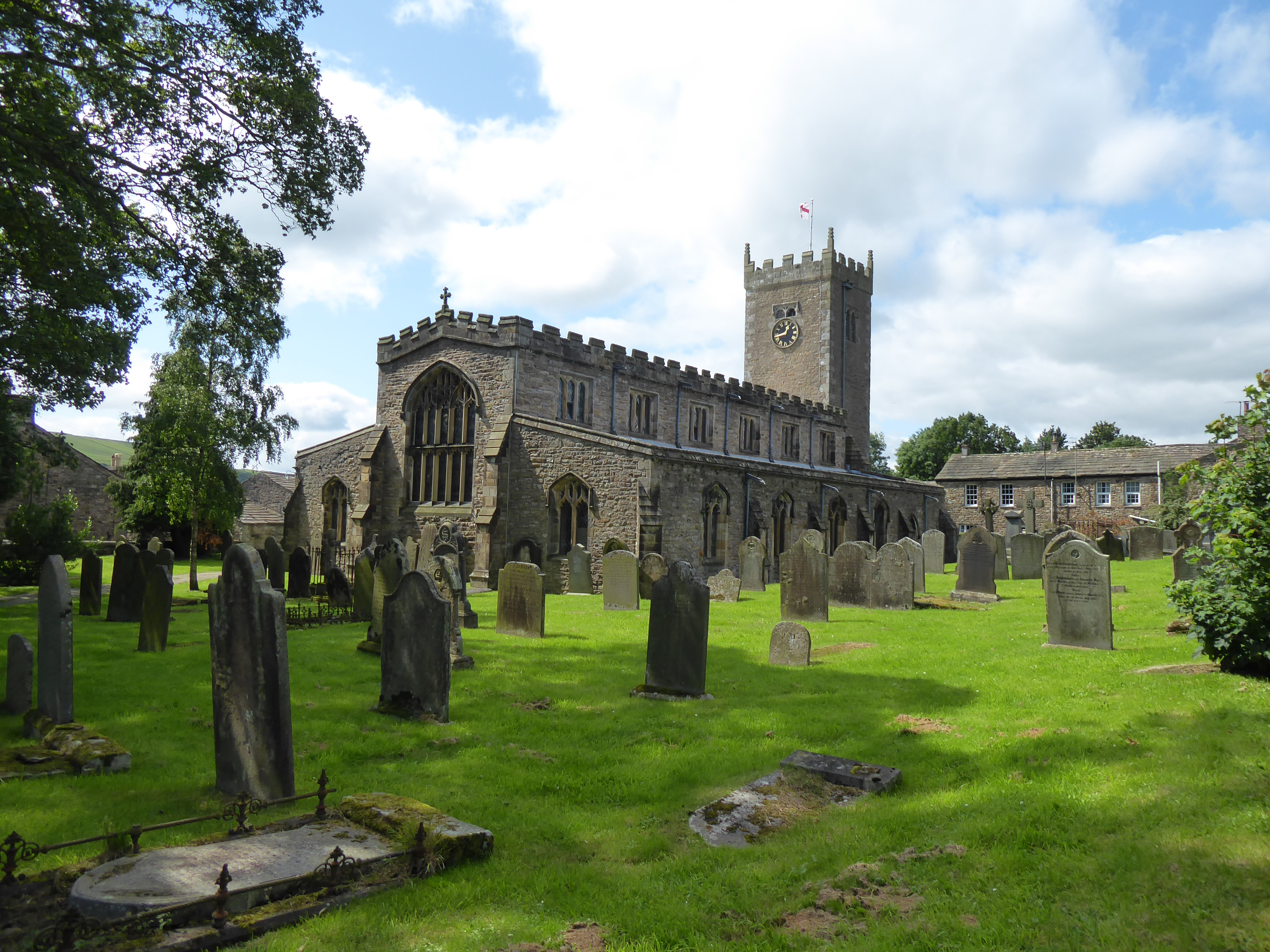
St. Oswald's Church, looking west

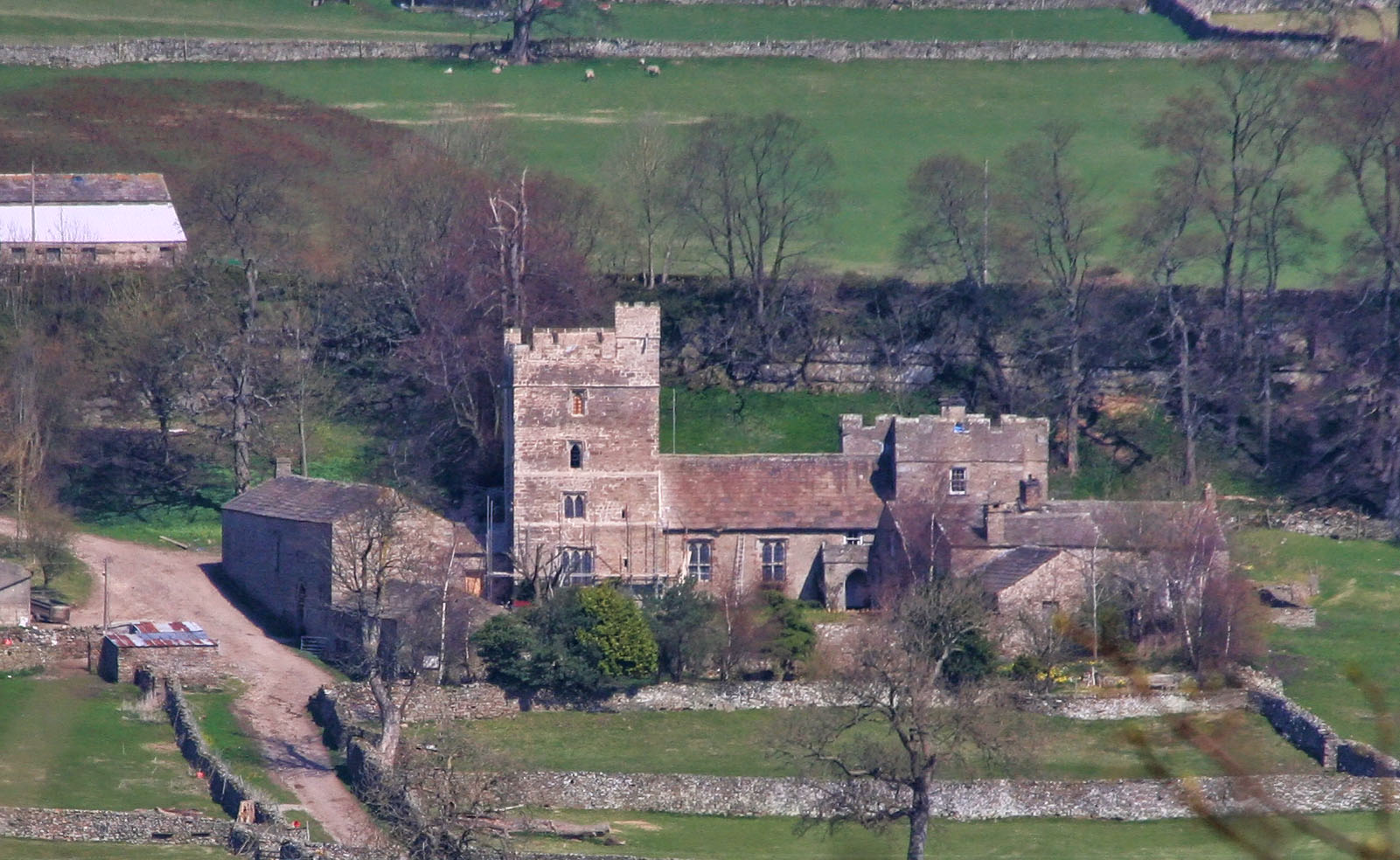
Nappa Hall

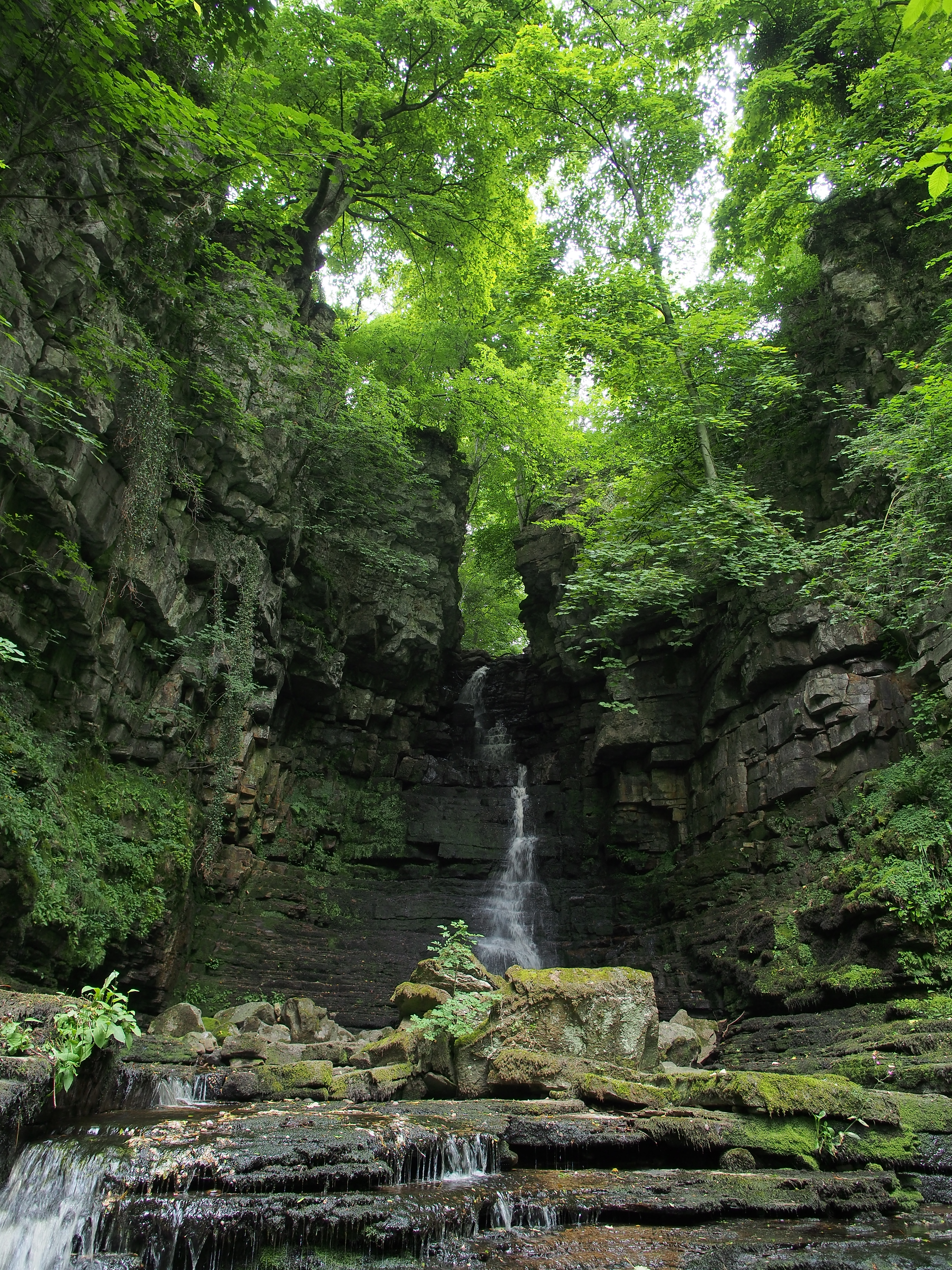
Mill Gill Force

== Religion ==
The local church is dedicated to St Oswald and was erected about 1466. There was a Wesleyan Methodist chapel here, erected in 1878 on the site of a former chapel. Subsequently, known as Bottom Chapel, it was run as a bed and breakfast before becoming a private dwelling. The Primitive Methodists also built a chapel in the village in 1869 as part of the Middleham Circuit.

== Notable buildings and landmarks ==
- St Oswald's Church is a Grade I listed building. It is of stone construction in the Perpendicular style, consisting of chancel, nave, aisles, south porch and an embattled western tower with pinnacles containing a clock and six bells.
- Nappa Hall is a Grade I listed building. Nappa Hall is a 15th-century fortified manor house. It was built in 1459 by James Metcalfe and his son Sir Thomas Metcalfe at a time when there were frequent raids by the Scots. A single-storey central hall sits between two towers, a four-storey western tower and a two-storey eastern tower. The four-storey tower has a turret, lit by slit vents, for a spiral staircase that climbs to crenellated parapets. The taller tower retains its original windows, but sash windows were inserted in the 18th century in the lower two-storey block which housed the kitchen and service rooms, at the opposite end of the hall. In the 17th century, an extra wing was added. The hall remained mainly in the hands of the Metcalfe family for nearly five and a half centuries until it was sold in 2008.
- Ring Cairn, Force Ing. West of Whitfield Gill is a ring cairn, which is a circle of stones that surround a depression on the ground and could signify a prehistoric burial site. This has been designated a Scheduled Ancient Monument.
- Ring Cairn near Church. About a quarter of a mile west of the Church in Askrigg is a Bronze Age ring cairn that today survives as an earthwork. This has been designated a Scheduled Ancient Monument.
- Mill Gill Force is a waterfall about three-quarters of a mile to the north-west, waters pouring down about 25 feet into a steep rocky ravine hidden in woodland. The waterfall can be reached by an easy 15 minutes walk from the village centre, the footpath is waymarked.
