= Cauldron Falls =

Cauldron Falls or Caldron Falls may refer to:

- The Cauldron Falls (North Yorkshire), small waterfall in West Burton, North Yorkshire, in Wensleydale, England
- Cauldron Snout, waterfall on the upper reaches of the River Tees, County Durham/Cumbria, England
- Cauldron Linn (River Devon), waterfall in Scotland
- Caldron Linn (Idaho), waterfall on Snake River, US
- The Chaudière Falls, in English "Cauldron Falls", a set of cascades and waterfall in the centre of the Ottawa-Gatineau metropolitan area in Canada
- The Caldron Falls, stream between Caldron Lake and Peyto Lake, Alberta, Canada
