= Walden Head =

Hamlet in North Yorkshire, England

Coordinates: 54.22202°N 2.02467°W

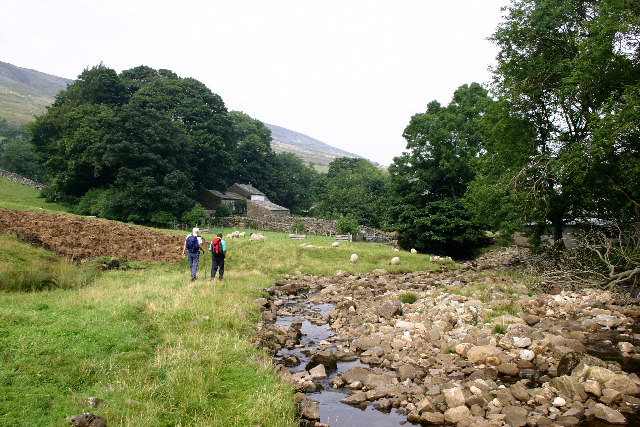
- Approaching Walden Head

- Location within North Yorkshire
- Civil parish: Burton-cum-Walden
- Unitary authority: North Yorkshire
- Ceremonial county: North Yorkshire
- Region: Yorkshire and the Humber
- Country: England
- Sovereign state: United Kingdom
- Police: North Yorkshire
- Fire: North Yorkshire
- Ambulance: Yorkshire

Walden Head is a hamlet in the Yorkshire Dales, North Yorkshire. It lies 5 miles (8 km) of Aysgarth and to the north is a similar village Walden. The village lies in the civil parish of Burton-cum-Walden.

The hamlet is bisected by Walden Beck which runs for 9 miles (14.3 km) from the watershed on Buckden Pike to Bishopdale Beck just before it flows under the A684 road in the valley. The road from West Burton peters out just south of the hamlet, but an old packhorse track goes over Buckden Pike and ends in the village of Starbotton.

Walden Head, like the other small settlements in the Walden Valley, have changed little over modern times. The Walden Valley is sometimes referred to as Waldendale, but this is not common. The name Walden means 'Valley of the Welsh'.

== See also ==
- Listed buildings in Burton-cum-Walden
