= Thoralby Primitive Methodist Chapel =

Building in Thoralby, North Yorkshire, England

Coordinates: 54°16′36″N 2°00′02″W

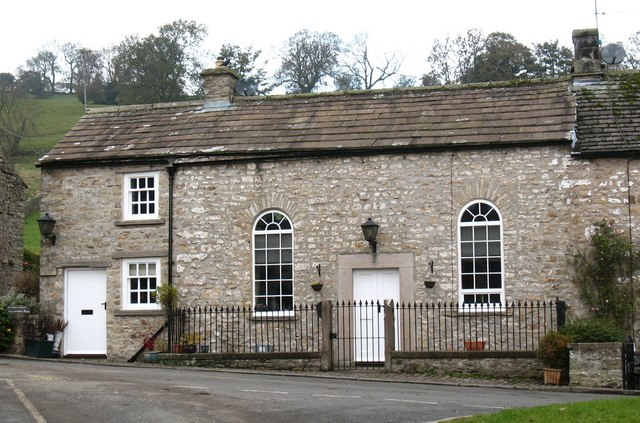
The building, in 2008

Thoralby Primitive Methodist Chapel is a historic building in Thoralby, a village in North Yorkshire, in England.

A poorhouse was built in Thoralby, perhaps in the 1820s, but fell into ruin by the 1840s. The Primitive Methodist Church held services in the village from at least 1822, and by 1849, 16 local residents successfully petitioned for a dedicated church building. It was decided to build on the site of the poorhouse, reusing the stone from that building. The construction cost £60, and on completion, the chapel could accommodate about 200 worshippers. By 1851, it was attracted an average of 30 worshippers to both morning and evening services each Sunday. With the Methodist Union in 1932, the chapel closed, worshippers moving to the former Wesleyan Methodist Church in the village. The former chapel became a village hall, then after World War II was converted into a farm building.

The building has been grade II listed since 1988. It is constructed of stone with a stone slate roof and three bays. The left bay has two storeys and contains a doorway and a sash window on each floor. The right two bays have one storey, and a central doorway with a stone surround flanked by round-arched windows.

== See also ==
- Listed buildings in Thoralby
