= Listed buildings in Thornton Rust =

Thornton Rust is a civil parish in the county of North Yorkshire, England. It contains twelve listed buildings that are recorded in the National Heritage List for England. All the listed buildings are designated at Grade II, the lowest of the three grades, which is applied to "buildings of national importance and special interest". The parish contains the village of Thornton Rust and the surrounding countryside. Apart from two mileposts on the A684 road, all the listed buildings are in the village, and, other than a telephone kiosk, are houses and cottages.

== Buildings ==
Name and location	Photograph	Date	Notes
Thornton Hall; 54.29537°N 2.04305°W		1672	A large house in stone, with chamfered rusticated quoins, gutter brackets and a stone slate roof with kneelers, copings and ball finials. There are two storeys, a hall range of two bays and projecting gabled cross-wings. The doorway has a sandstone surround with splayed bases, an eared and moulded architrave, a pulvinated frieze and a modillion cornice. The windows are sashes, some tripartite. At the rear is a central projecting two-storey porch containing a doorway with a quoined surround, a moulded arris, a dated and initialled lintel and an elaborate hood mould. Above the porch is a round-arched window flanked by small triangular-headed windows.
East End Cottage and outbuildings 54.29535°N 2.04083°W		Late 17th century	The house and flanking outbuildings are in stone, with quoins, and a stone slate roof with shaped kneelers and gable coping. There are two storeys, and the house has four bays and a rear wing. On the front is a two-storey gabled porch containing a doorway with a chamfered surround, above which is a mullioned window. The other windows on the front of the house are sashes and fire windows. Both outbuildings have external steps leading up to doorways.
Manor House; 54.29588°N 2.04374°W		Mid-18th century	The house is in stone and has a stone slate roof with a shaped kneeler and stone coping on the left. There are two storeys and four bays. The basket-arched doorway has a stone surround on plinth and a cornice. Most of the windows are sashes in architraves with hood moulds, and on the right bay, a former outbuilding, the windows are casements.
Manor Farmhouse; 54.29546°N 2.04137°W		Late 18th century	The farmhouse is in stone with a stone slate roof. There are two storeys and four bays. The doorway has a stone surround on plinths, and the windows are sashes in stone surrounds.
Fosse Cottage; 54.29545°N 2.04202°W		Late 18th to early 19th century	The house is in rendered stone, and has a two-span stone slate roof with shaped kneelers and stone coping. There are two storeys, a double depth plan and two bays. The central doorway has a stone surround with splayed bases, a pulvinated frieze and a cornice, and the windows are sashes.
Post Office; 54.29547°N 2.04182°W		1805	The house is in stone, with quoins, gutter brackets, and a stone slate roof with shaped kneelers. There are two storeys and two bays. The central doorway has a stone surround, a fanlight, a dated and initialled lintel, a pulvinated frieze and a cornice. The windows are sashes with slab lintels.
Rose Cottage; 54.29543°N 2.04118°W		Early 19th century	The cottage is in stone with a stone slate roof. There are two storeys and three bays. The central doorway has a stone surround, and the windows are sashes.
Yoredale; 54.29541°N 2.04105°W		Early 19th century	The cottage is in stone, with quoins on the right, and a stone slate roof. There are two storeys and two bays. The central doorway has a stone surround, and the windows are sashes.
Havenhurst; 54.29511°N 2.04067°W		1827	A chapel and school, later a private house, it is in stone, with quoins, and a stone slate roof with stone copings. There are two storeys and an attic, and two bays. On the left of the ground floor is a canted bay window, and on the right is a four-light casement window. The upper floor contains three-light casement windows, and above them is an inscribed and dated panel. The entry is on the right return, and at the rear are the heads of two round-arched windows with imposts and keystones.
Milepost near Wauley Beck; 54.30153°N 2.04004°W		Late 19th century	The milepost on the north side of the A684 road is in cast iron. It has a triangular plan and a sloping top. On both sides are pointing hands, on the left side is the distance to Leyburn, and on the right side the distance to Hawes.
Milepost west of the parish boundary 54.29666°N 2.01724°W		Late 19th century	The milepost on the north side of the A684 road is in cast iron. It has a triangular plan and a sloping top. On both sides are pointing hands, on the left side is the distance to Leyburn, and on the right side the distance to Hawes.
Telephone kiosk 54.29517°N 2.04145°W		1935	The telephone kiosk is of the K6 type designed by Giles Gilbert Scott. Constructed in cast iron with a square plan and a dome, it has three unperforated crowns in the top panels.
