= Longridge Farmhouse =

Historic building in Bishopdale, North Yorkshire, England

Coordinates: 54°14′40″N 2°03′44″W

Longridge Farmhouse is a historic building in Bishopdale, North Yorkshire, a valley in England.

The farmhouse was built for George and Elizabeth Dodsworth, and is dated 1653, although its kitchen may be older. The building was Grade II* listed in 1969, along with its outbuilding, which appears to have originally been part of the house, and has been converted into a garage. The farm is a long-term tenancy, and was sold in 1997 for £125,000.

Nikolaus Pevsner simply describes the building as "good", while Yorkshire Life praises its "two-storeyed porch and other fine details".

The farmhouse and outbuilding to the left are in stone with a string course and a stone slate roof. There are two storeys, three bays, and a rear outshut. The middle bay projects as a two-storey gabled porch containing a doorway with a quoined surround, a moulded arris and a triangular head, over which is an initialled and dated inscription. The inner doorway has a similar inscription on sunken spandrels. On the returns of the porch are round-headed windows with a chamfered surround, and elsewhere are double-chamfered mullioned windows, some with hood moulds. Inside, there is a large fireplace with a pointed arch with a salt box and a beehive oven, a triangular-headed fireplace in the parlour, and various exposed beams.

== See also ==
- Grade II* listed buildings in North Yorkshire (district)
- Listed buildings in Bishopdale, North Yorkshire
