= Smelter Farmhouse =

Historic building in Bishopdale, North Yorkshire, England

Coordinates: 54.2415°N 2.0559°W

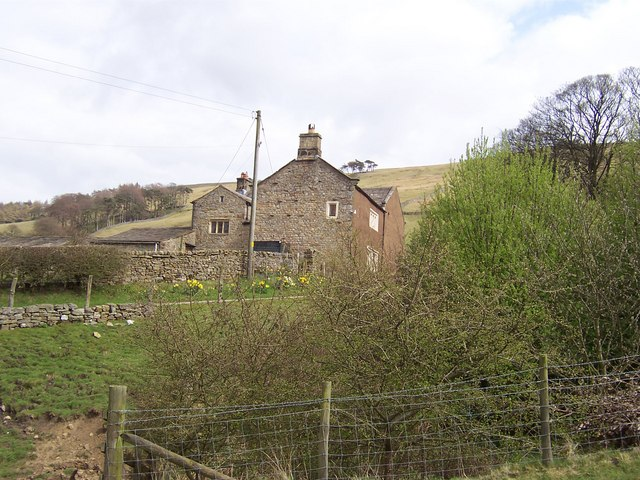
The building, in 2006

Smelter Farmhouse is a historic building in Bishopdale, North Yorkshire, a valley in England.

Smelter is the second farm from the top of Bishopdale. The farmhouse is dated 1701, and was probably built for John Horner. A Mediaeval hearth has been found on the hillside nearby, and the building's name is probably a reference to this. In 1908, it was described as "a quaint-looking structure", and was the house of the local gameskeeper. It was Grade II* listed in 1969, but was uninhabited for a time later in the century.

The farmhouse is in stone with quoins, and a stone slate roof with stone coping and shaped kneelers. There are two storeys and an irregular U-shaped plan, with a front range of three bays, a rear wing on the left, and a shorter staircase wing on the right. The central doorway has an elaborately moulded surround, the inner moulding forming a stepped head with the date and initials on the spandrels. Above is a pulvinated frieze and a segmental pediment. The window over the doorway has a single light with a stepped head, there is an oval fire window, and elsewhere are double-chamfered mullioned windows, some with segmental-arched lights, and some with hood moulds.

== See also ==
- Grade II* listed buildings in North Yorkshire (district)
- Listed buildings in Bishopdale, North Yorkshire
