= Listed buildings in Burton-cum-Walden =

Burton-cum-Walden is a civil parish in the county of North Yorkshire, England. It contains 28 listed buildings that are recorded in the National Heritage List for England. All the listed buildings are designated at Grade II, the lowest of the three grades, which is applied to "buildings of national importance and special interest". The parish contains the village of West Burton, the smaller settlements of Walden and Walden Head, and the surrounding countryside. Most of the listed buildings are houses and cottages with associated structures, including follies, farmhouses and farm buildings. The others include a set of stocks, a bridge, a market cross, a boundary stone, a chimney and flue from a lead smelting mill, and two telephone kiosks.

== Buildings ==
Name and location	Photograph	Date	Notes
Old building west of Kentuckey House; 54.22225°N 2.02463°W		Late 16th to early 17th century	A house with an outbuilding, later used for other purposes, it is in whitewashed stone on a plinth of large boulders, with quoins and a stone slate roof. The house has two storeys, and the outbuilding to the right has one. In the ground floor of the house are two blocked mullioned windows. The upper floor contains a round-headed single-light window with a chamfered surround, and a three-light double-chamfered mullion window with wrought iron stanchions on the outer lights. The outbuilding has a segmental-headed cart entrance with voussoirs and a slab hood mould.
West Routeron Gill Farmhouse and outbuildings 54.22803°N 2.00962°W	—	Late 16th to early 17th century	The house and outbuildings are in stone with a stone slate roof and two storeys. The farmhouse has a plinth, and two bays, and contains double-chamfered mullioned windows. To the left is an outbuilding with a wide opening on the ground floor. The outbuilding to the right has quoins, a sash window, a mullioned window, and a small triangular pigeoncote with projecting stone ledges.
Cowstone Gill House; 54.24689°N 1.98759°W	—	1674	A farmhouse and barn combined into a house, in stone with a stone slate roof. There are two storeys, and each part has two bays. The original house on the left has a rear outshut, and a later gabled porch, above which is a dated and initialled plaque. The windows on the front are sashes, and at the rear are the surrounds of double-chamfered mullioned windows. The former barn has two-light mullioned windows with casements, and at the rear are a doorway and a pitching door converted into a window.
Whiterow Farmhouse; 54.24798°N 1.97765°W	—	Late 17th century	A farmhouse that was later extended, in stone with a stone slate roof. There are two storeys and four bays. In the ground floor of the original part the windows are mullioned, and elsewhere they are casements.
Ryder's Farmhouse; 54.27758°N 1.97530°W		Late 17th to early 18th century	The farmhouse is in stone, with quoins, and a stone slate roof with stone coping and a shaped kneeler on the left. There are two storeys, three bays, and a central rear two-storey outshut. The windows are a mix, some with double-chamfered mullions, some are casements, others are sashes, and at the rear is a round-headed stair window.
Stocks; 54.27547°N 1.97505°W		17th or 18th century	The stocks consist of two round-headed sandstone posts about 500 millimetres (20 in) high, with slots in the internal sides. Between them are two horizontal wooden boards with two leg holes. A seat was provided by the lowest step of the market cross.
West End Cottage and Inglenook Cottage; 54.27634°N 1.97541°W		Late 17th to early 18th century	A pair of cottages in stone, with quoins, and a stone slate roof with stone copings and shaped kneelers. There are two storeys and two bays. The paired doorways in the centre have chamfered quoined surrounds. The windows are paired sashes with chamfered surrounds, mullions and hood moulds.
Black Bull Cottages; 54.27521°N 1.97539°W		Early 18th century	An inn and stables, later a house and a cottage in stone, with quoins, and a slate roof with stone coping and shaped kneelers. There are two storeys, five bays, and a lean-to on the left. The doorway has a plain surround, to its left is a five-step mounting block, and to its right is a cheese press weight. The windows are horizontally-sliding sashes.
The Grange; 54.27842°N 1.97397°W		Early 18th century	A large house in rendered stone, with stone dressings, raised quoins, and a stone slate hipped roof. There are two storeys and attics, and seven bays. The doorway has a moulded surround and a segmental-headed fanlight. The windows are sashes with moulded surrounds, in the roof are two gabled dormers, and at the rear is a round-headed stair window. To the west is a low two-storey service wing, linked by a wing with a segmental-headed bellcote. The service wing contains two-light chamfered mullioned windows.
Wensleydale Cottage and outbuilding 54.27520°N 1.97614°W		Early 18th century	The house and outbuilding are in stone, with quoins, and a stone slate roof with stone coping, a moulded kneeler on the right, a shaped kneeler on the left, and two storeys. The house has two bays and a rear outshut. In the centre is a doorway that has an architrave with capitals, a frieze and a cornice. The windows have architraves, containing horizontally-sliding sashes in the left bay, and paired mullioned windows in the right bay. The outbuilding to the left has a segmental-headed opening and a window above.
Old Hall Stables; 54.27431°N 1.97609°W		Mid 18th century	A coach house converted for residential use, it is in stone, with quoins, and a stone slate roof with stone copings, shaped kneelers, and a finial at the east end with a weathervane and an inscription on the base. There are two storeys and six bays. In the centre is a segmental-headed carriage entrance converted into a recessed porch. The ground floor contains sash windows, and two round-arched doorways converted into windows, with impost blocks and keystones. The windows in the upper floor are casements. At the rear is a doorway with a quoined surround and a dated and initialled panel. In the left return is a triangular pigeoncote.
Sorrelsykes House; 54.28964°N 1.96455°W		18th century	A country house, later divided, it is in stuccoed, with quoins, modillion gutter brackets, and a stone slate roof, hipped on the left. There are two storeys, a partial basement and attics, and an east front of nine bays. The middle three bays project under a pediment, and contain a doorway with an architrave and a cornice on consoles. To the left is another doorway containing a fanlight with a chamfered quoined surround and a round-arched architrave. The left bay contains a two-storey canted bay window, and most of the windows are sashes, with a variety of surrounds. In the left return is a semicircular bay window.
Grange Farm Cottage; 54.27962°N 1.97313°W		Late 18th century	The cottage is in stone and has a stone slate roof with stone copings. There are two storeys and two bays, and a recessed bay on the right with a hipped roof. The doorway has a quoined surround, a lintel with rounded inner corners, and a keystone, and the windows are sashes.
Stables, Flanders Hall; 54.28014°N 1.97191°W		Late 18th century	The stables and coach house are in stone, with quoins, and a stone slate roof with stone gable copings. There are two storeys and a loft, and three bays. The middle bay is gabled and contains an oculus and a pigeoncote with ledges. In the centre is a segmental-arched carriage opening, and the outer bays contain round-arched doorways with impost blocks, a fanlight and a keystone, and in the upper floor are casement windows.
Flanders Hall; 54.28007°N 1.97159°W		1779	The house is in stone, with raised quoins, and a stone slate roof with stone copings and shaped kneelers. There are two storeys, a main range of five bays, and a T-shaped plan with a double-depth rear wing. In the centre of the front is a doorway with a sandstone architrave, a fanlight, a pulvinated frieze and a modillion pediment. The windows are sashes in architraves. At the rear are three bays, and a doorway with an architrave, a fanlight, a pulvinated frieze and a cornice.
Burton Bridge; 54.27947°N 1.97282°W		Late 18th to early 19th century	The bridge carries Morpeth Gate over Walden Beck. It is in stone and consists of a single segmental arch. The bridge has two orders of voussoirs, rubble stones set on edge to form copings for the parapets, and in the downstream parapet is an initialled stone.
Wall, railings, gates and gate piers, Flanders Hall; 54.28023°N 1.97136°W	—	Late 18th to early 19th century	The low walls to the east of the house are in stone with caned coping. In the centre are chamfered rusticated gate piers with decorative caps. The gates and railings are in wrought iron, the railings are spiked, and have cast iron urn finials on the standards. The gates are paired and have wavy bars and scrolled decoration.
Hill Top Farmhouse; 54.23593°N 1.99618°W	—	Late 18th to early 19th century	The farmhouse is in stone, with a stone slate roof, two storeys, four bays and a rear outshut. The doorway has a three-pane fanlight with a segmental-headed surround. Above the doorway is a casement window, and the other windows are sashes.
Haw House; 54.24294°N 1.99114°W	—	1811	A farmhouse, later a private house, incorporating earlier features, it is in stone with quoins, and a stone slate roof with stone copings. There are two storeys and three bays. The central doorway has a quoined surround, moulding to the arris, and a lintel with a triangular soffit. Above the doorway is an inscribed and dated plaque, and the windows are sashes. At the rear is a round-arched stair window, and the surrounds of double-chamfered two-light mullioned windows.
Obelisk; 54.27544°N 1.97508°W		1820	A market cross that was restored in 1889, it is in stone, with an octagonal plan, and it consists of an obelisk on a base of five steps. Part way up is a band with a carved Maltese cross, and the dates of erection and restoration, and at the top is a ball finial and a weathervane.
Boundary stone 54.29348°N 1.96713°W		Early 19th century	The boundary stone is on the north side of the A684 road. It is in sandstone, and about 500 millimetres (20 in) high with a rounded top. On the stone is a weathered inscription.
Galloway House; 54.27610°N 1.97347°W		c. 1830	The house is in stone with sandstone dressings and a stone slate roof. There are two storeys and five bays, the left bay projecting. In the centre is a porch with a Tudor arch, decorated spandrels, and a flat lead roof. The windows are double-chamfered and mullioned, with hood moulds. The left bay has quoins, a string course and an embattled parapet, and in the left return is a window with three stepped pointed lights.
Pepper Pot Folly, Sorrelsykes Park; 54.28999°N 1.96239°W		Early to mid 19th century	The folly is in stone and has a circular plan. There are two stages, the lower stage slightly tapering, the upper stage concave, each with a projecting top course of stones, surmounted by a conical cap. On the west side is a very small doorway.
Rocket Ship Folly, Sorrelsykes Park; 54.29050°N 1.96220°W		Early to mid 19th century	The folly is in stone, and has a base in the form of a cube with tapering diagonal buttresses. On the west side is a narrow doorway with a blind oculus above, and at the top is flagged coping. The base is surmounted by a tapering circular obelisk containing two blind round-headed vents and with flagged capping.
Chimney and flue 54.26421°N 1.97227°W		1847	The chimney and flue are survivors from a lead smelting mill. The chimney is in stone with a square plan, it is about 6 metres (20 ft) high, and leans and tapers slightly. The flue runs southwest from it, and at the junction with the chimney it is barrel-vaulted.
Coach House and Stable Cottage, The Grange; 54.27898°N 1.97393°W		1884	The coach house and cottage are in stone, with quoins, and a slate roof with coped gables and kneelers. The coach house has two storeys and seven bays. The middle bay of the main front projects, and contains a segmental-headed carriage entrance. Also on the front are doorways, some with fanlights, and sash and casement windows. To the west is a single-storey cottage, and to the east is a short stone wall, and a pair of gate piers with ball finials and iron gates.
Telephone kiosk 54.23954°N 1.99515°W	—	1935	The K6 type telephone kiosk outside the former Methoist church was designed by Giles Gilbert Scott. Constructed in cast iron with a square plan and a dome, it has three unperforated crowns in the top panels.
AA Box 442; 54.29553°N 1.96040°W		c. 1956	The telephone kiosk, built by The AA, is in timber, and has a rectangular plan, with an AA plaque and box number on the left side. The gable on each side has an AA plaque and a bargeboard.
