= AA Box 442 =

Listed building in North Yorkshire, England

Coordinates: 54.2955°N 1.9604°W

AA Box 442

AA Box 442 is a grade II listed building on the A684 road, in the parish of Burton-cum-Walden, in North Yorkshire, England. The 'Sentry' box is a former Automobile Association (AA) patrol box, one of 600 built so that AA patrol officers had somewhere to have a break or store fuel. Non-staff members of the AA were later given keys to the boxes, so that the could telephone for help if their vehicle had broken down. Box 442, also known as Asygarth Box, is now one of only fourteen boxes left standing in their original locations (with a further three at the AA headquarters). Although the AA continue to maintain Box 442, the immediate environs are looked after by a team of volunteers who have restored the dry stone wall behind the box, and they have planted flowers around its immediate environs.

The box, which was grade II listed in 1988, dates back until 1956 and is situated between Swinithwaite and Aysgarth on the south side of the A684 road, near to the junction with the B6160 road. Although it is called Aysgarth Box, it is actually in the parish of Burton-cum-Walden. It is one of eight listed boxes in England, and there is only one other AA box in Yorkshire, which is on the A166 road, 4.5 miles (7.2 km) east of York at Garrowby Hill. The phone-linked network inside the boxes was shut down by the AA in 2002 due to the use and availability of mobile phones. The box is a mark IV design with winged AA logos and is painted in black with yellow edging.

== See also ==
- Listed buildings in Burton-cum-Walden
