= Thornton Rust =

Village and civil parish in North Yorkshire, England

Coordinates: 54.295662°N 2.0439506°W

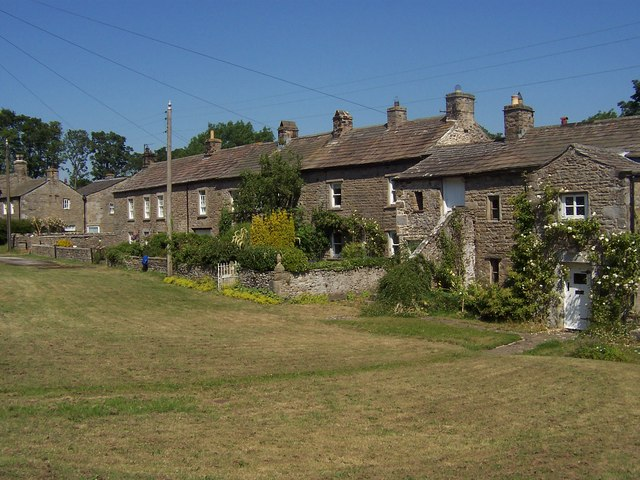
- Cottages in Thornton Rust

- Location within North Yorkshire
- Population: 107 (2011 Census)
- OS grid reference: SD972888
- Unitary authority: North Yorkshire
- Ceremonial county: North Yorkshire
- Region: Yorkshire and the Humber
- Country: England
- Sovereign state: United Kingdom
- Post town: LEYBURN
- Postcode district: DL8
- Police: North Yorkshire
- Fire: North Yorkshire
- Ambulance: Yorkshire
- UK Parliament: Richmond and Northallerton

Thornton Rust is a village and civil parish in North Yorkshire, England. It lies in the Yorkshire Dales about 2 miles (3.2 km) west of Aysgarth, high on the south bank of the River Ure in Wensleydale.

== History ==
The village is mentioned in Domesday Book of 1086 by the name Toreton. At the time of the Norman invasion the manor belonged to Thor but afterwards was granted to Count Alan of Brittany. A mesne lordship was held here by Sybil of Thornton in 1286, but the head tenant of the manor was Robert de Tateshall, who was also lord of Thorlaby manor. The descent of Thornton Rust manor followed that of Thoralby into the 19th century.

The toponymy of the village name is derived from the combination of the Old English words þorn and tūn, which gave the meaning of Thorn tree farm, and partly it is said from Bishop Restitutus, to whom the medieval chapel was claimed to have been dedicated, though evidence is lacking. The chapel no longer exists.

The children’s author William Mayne lived and died in Thornton Rust.

== Governance ==
The village lies within the Richmond and Northallerton UK Parliament constituency. From 1974 to 2023 it was part of the district of Richmondshire and is now administered by the unitary North Yorkshire Council.

The civil parish shares a grouped parish council with the civil parishes of Aysgarth, Bishopdale, Newbiggin and Thoralby, known as Aysgarth & District Parish Council.

== Geography ==
The village is at an elevation of 870 feet (270 m) at its highest. The River Ure and the A684 are 0.5 miles (0.8 km) to the north. The village of Aysgarth is 2.5 miles (4 km) to the south-east and Bainbridge 2.6 miles (4.2 km) to the north-west. It is a typical linear village on top of a limestone scar.

== Demography ==
Population
| Year | 1881 | 1891 | 1901 | 1911 | 1921 | 1931 | 1951 | 1961 | 2001 | 2011 |
| Total | 143 | 121 | 110 | 112 | 108 | 125 | 127 | 142 | 135 | 107 |

=== 2001 census ===
The 2001 UK census showed that the population was split 50% male to 50% female. The religious constituency was made of 78.4% Christian and the rest stating no religion or not stating at all. The ethnic make-up was 97.7% White British and 2.3% White other. There were 57 dwellings.

=== 2011 census ===
The 2011 UK census showed that the population was split 51.4% male to 48.6% female. The religious constituency was made of 78.5% Christian and the rest stating no religion or not stating at all. The ethnic make-up was 98.1% White British and 1.9% each White Other. There were 63 dwellings.

== Community and culture ==
The village has a bus service operated by the Little White Bus between Hawes and Leyburn. More services can be reached from the nearby villages of Aysgarth and Worton.

== See also ==
- Listed buildings in Thornton Rust
