= Aiskew Roman villa =

Roman villa in North Yorkshire, England

Coordinates: 54.304141°N 1.5813715°W

- Location within North Yorkshire

General information
- Architectural style: Romano-British Villa
- Location: Aiskew, North Yorkshire grid reference SE2733989918, United Kingdom

Aiskew Roman villa is a Roman villa in Aiskew, North Yorkshire, England. It was identified by geophysical survey in July 2013 and partly excavated between November 2014 and February 2015.

== Discovery ==
The villa was discovered in 2013 by a geophysical survey of the site in advance of construction of the Bedale, Aiskew, and Leeming Bar bypass. The site was excavated by Pre-construct archaeology. There was no prior indication of a villa at this site and Peter Rowe, North Yorkshire's County Archaeologist described the discovery as "a surprise, it was a shock". Only a small part of the villa complex was excavated during this scheme, with over 95% of it reportedly left undisturbed.

== Interpretation ==
The site is close to the Roman road of Dere Street and is less than 10 kilometres (6.2 mi) from Cataractonium (Roman Catterick).

The villa is of the 'winged -corridor' type and has a long central range with a 'wing' at each end. It dates to the 3rd and 4th centuries AD. One of the rooms at the north-east end included an opus signinum floor. A room with a hypocaust was also included at the north wing. Finds from the site include a silver stylus, a stamped amphora rim from north Africa, Nene Valley Colour Coated Ware, and samian ware. It was constructed over a pre-existing field system and an enclosure dating to the late Iron Age to early Roman period.
