= West Burton Obelisk =

Obelisk in North Yorkshire, England

Coordinates: 54°16′32″N 1°58′30″W

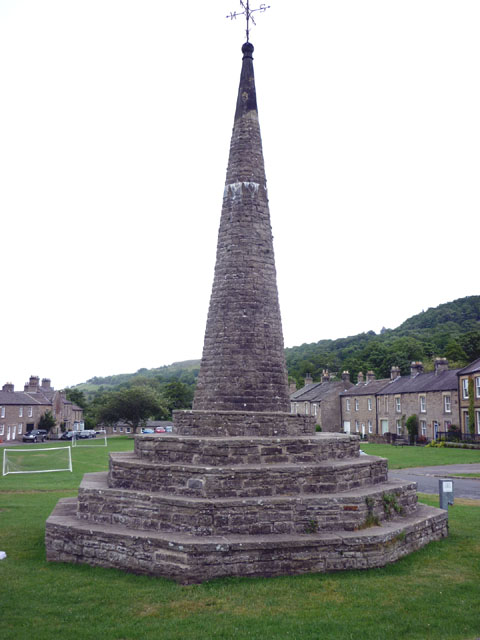

The West Burton Obelisk is a historic structure in West Burton, North Yorkshire, a village in England.

The obelisk was constructed in 1820, on the village green. It is often described as being a market cross, but there is no record of a market ever having been held in the village. It is possible that it may have been used as a preaching cross. The structure was restored in 1889, when its top was replaced by a ball and weathervane, the old top being incorporated into a barn. The obelisk was Grade II listed in 1952.

The octagonal obelisk is built of stone, a mixture of rubble, stone slabs, and ashlar. It resembles a church spire, set on a base of five steps. Part way up is a band with a carved Maltese cross, and the dates of erection and restoration, and at the top is a ball finial and a weathervane.

== See also ==
- Listed buildings in Burton-cum-Walden
