= The George Inn, Thoralby =

Coordinates: 54°16′36″N 2°00′05″W

- Pub
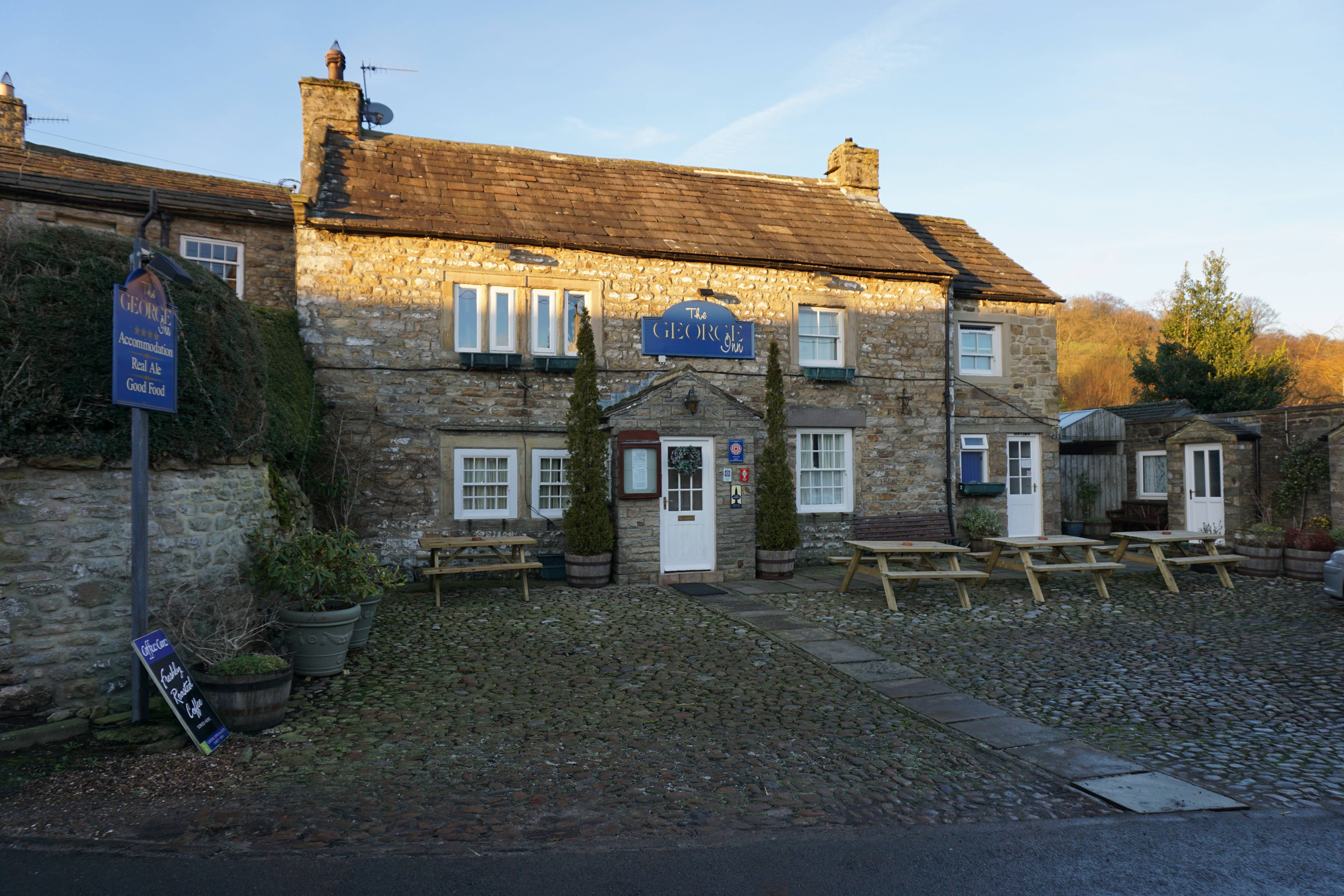

- Location within North Yorkshire
- Unitary authority: North Yorkshire
- Ceremonial county: North Yorkshire
- Region: Yorkshire and the Humber
- Country: England
- Sovereign state: United Kingdom

The George Inn is a historic pub in Thoralby, North Yorkshire, England.

== History ==
The pub was built in 1732, and is the last survivor of three in the village. It was extended to the right, and a porch was added, in the 20th century. The building was grade II listed in 1969. In addition to the bar, it has a dining area, accommodation, and a beer garden.

== Description ==
The pub is built of stone, with quoins, and a stone slate roof with a shaped kneeler and stone coping on the left. There are two storeys and two bays. In the centre is a gabled porch, and a doorway with a dated and initialled lintel. The window on the upper floor of the left bay is mullioned with four lights, and the others are sashes. Inside, it has an original fireplace and early panelling.

== See also ==
- Listed buildings in Thoralby
