= Walden, North Yorkshire =

Hamlet and dale in North Yorkshire, England

Coordinates: 54.23781°N 1.98278°W

Walden
- Location within North Yorkshire
- Civil parish: Burton-cum-Walden
- Unitary authority: North Yorkshire
- Ceremonial county: North Yorkshire
- Region: Yorkshire and the Humber
- Country: England
- Sovereign state: United Kingdom
- Police: North Yorkshire
- Fire: North Yorkshire
- Ambulance: Yorkshire

Walden is a dale and hamlet in the Yorkshire Dales, North Yorkshire, England. The dale is a side dale of Wensleydale, sometimes known as Waldendale or Walden Dale to distinguish it from the hamlet. The hamlet lies 2 miles (4 km) south of West Burton at the mouth of the dale. The smaller hamlet of Walden Head lies at the head of the dale, 1 mile (2 km) south of Walden.

The name Walden, first recorded in 1270, comes from the Old English wala denu, meaning "valley of the Welshmen".

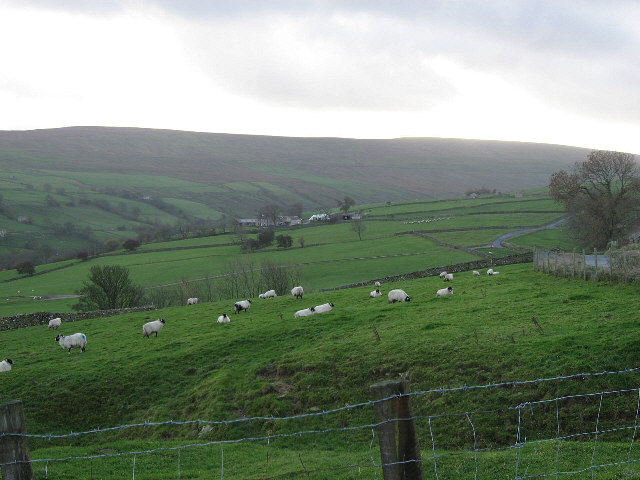
Looking south up Walden Dale

== See also ==
- Listed buildings in Burton-cum-Walden
