= Listed buildings in Thoralby =

Thoralby is a civil parish in the county of North Yorkshire, England. It contains 25 listed buildings that are recorded in the National Heritage List for England. Of these, one is listed at Grade II*, the middle of the three grades, and the others are at Grade II, the lowest grade. The parish contains the village of Thoralby and the surrounding countryside. Most of the listed buildings are houses, cottages and associated structures, farmhouses and farm buildings, and the others include a public house, the village hall, a bridge, a former chapel and a telephone kiosk.

== Key ==
Grade	Criteria
II*	Particularly important buildings of more than special interest
II	Buildings of national importance and special interest

== Buildings ==
Name and location	Photograph	Date	Notes	Grade
Hallgarth Farmhouse and Cottage; 54.27424°N 1.99916°W	—	Early 17th century	A farmhouse, later a house and a cottage to the right, in stone with a stone slate roof, moulded kneelers and stone coping There are two storeys and three bays, the middle bay double-depth. On the front are two doorways with chamfered quoined surrounds and hood moulds, and the windows are mullioned. At the rear are two mullioned and transomed stair windows.	II
Old Hall; 54.27501°N 2.00900°W	—	1641	A former manor house in stone, with quoins, and a stone slate roof with shaped kneelers, moulded stone coping and obelisk finials. There are two storeys, a double depth plan and three bays. In the centre is a two-storey gabled porch containing a doorway with a chamfered quoined surround, and a Tudor arched head with initials in the spandrels, and a lintel containing a recessed panel with the date and motifs, and a hood mould. Most of the windows are mullioned, some with hood moulds. Inside, there is an inglenook fireplace.	II*
South View; 54.27651°N 2.00213°W		1653	A house and a cottage in stone on a boulder plinth with a stone slate roof. There are two storeys and three bays. On the front are two doorways, the left inserted, and the right with a chamfered quoined surround, a depressed-arched head and a lintel containing panels with initials and the date. The windows on the left bay are mullioned, and the others are horizontally sliding sashes. At the rear are large quoins, and a semicircular stair turret.	II
Barn east-north-east of Chapel Garth; 54.27608°N 1.99770°W	—	Late 17th century (probable)	The barn is in stone, with quoins, through-slates, square vents, a stone slate roof, and about four bays. The other features include a blocked elliptical-arched doorway with composite jambs and tie stones, a doorway with a moulded surround and a chamfered lintel, a small two-light mullioned window, and a slit window with a chamfered moulded surround.	II
Swinacote; 54.27172°N 2.01764°W	—	1704	A farmhouse, later a private house, in stone with quoins and a stone slate roof. There are two storeys and three bays. On the front is a porch with a window and a doorway on the right return. The windows are mullioned, some with hood moulds. At the rear is a porch, and a doorway with moulding on the arris, a triangular soffit, and a dated and initialled lintel.	II
Village Hall; 54.27654°N 2.00131°W		1704	A house, later the village hall, it is in stone with quoins and a stone slate roof. There is one storey and four bays. On the second bay is a two-storey gabled porch with quoins, containing a doorway with a chamfered quoined surround, and a lintel with a recessed panel containing the date, initials and decorative motifs. Above is a blocked single-light window with a chamfered surround and a hood mould, and a small oculus in the gable, which has shaped kneelers, moulded coping and a finial. The rest of the building has mullioned windows, and on the rear is a single-storey gabled porch and casement windows.	II
Grove House; 54.27682°N 2.00033°W	—	Early 18th century	Two houses, the right house added in 1811, and later combined. There are in stone with stone slate roofs, and each part has two storeys. The earlier part on the left has two bays, a doorway and a blocked doorway to the left. There is one single-light window, and the others are mullioned with three lights. The later part, at one time a boot shop, then a public house, is taller and has one wide bay. The doorway has a chamfered surround, and a dated and initialled lintel, and the windows are sashes.	II
The George Inn; 54.27680°N 2.00106°W		1732	The public house is in stone, with quoins, and a stone slate roof with a shaped kneeler and stone coping on the left. There are two storeys and two bays. In the centre is a gabled porch, and a doorway with a dated and initialled lintel. The window on the upper floor of the left bay is mullioned with four lights, and the others are sashes.	II
Heaning Hall and Farmhouse; 54.27941°N 1.99767°W	—	1734	A house with a farmhouse to the left, in stone, with quoins, and a stone slate roof with shaped kneelers and moulded coping. It is in two and three storeys and has six bays. On the fourth bay is a two-storey gabled porch containing a doorway with an architrave, a fanlight, and a cornice on consoles, and above it is a single-light window with an architrave and a dated keystone. On the second bay is a flat-roofed single-storey porch, and above it is a pitching door with impost blocks converted into a window. The windows are mullioned, and the fifth bay has a full dormer.	II
High Green Farmhouse; 54.27697°N 1.99989°W	—	Early to mid-18th century	A farmhouse, later a private house, in stone, with quoins on the right, and a stone slate roof with a shaped kneeler and stone coping on the right. There are two storeys, a double depth plan and four bays. The doorway in the third bay has a rusticated quoined surround, and the windows are sashes.	II
Former Post Office; 54.27712°N 1.99932°W		Early to mid-18th century	The house is in stone on a plinth, with quoins, and a stone slate roof with slab coping on the left. There are two storeys, attics and a cellar, and three bays. The central doorway has an architrave, and the windows are casements in architraves, apart from the window above the doorway, which has a concrete surround.	II
Rose Cottage; 54.27614°N 2.00354°W	—	Early to mid-18th century	A house and a cottage, later combined, in stone with a stone slate roof. There are two storeys and five bays. On the front are two doorways, some of the windows are mullioned in architraves, and the others are casements.	II
Holmeside; 54.27479°N 1.99708°W	—	Mid-18th century	A farmhouse, later a private house, in stone, with quoins on the left, and a stone slate roof with slab coping on the left. The doorway is in the centre, the windows are mullioned, and at the rear is a partly blocked window with a mullion and a transom.	II
Fernlea; 54.27674°N 2.00132°W	—	Late 18th century	A cottage, house and stable under one roof, in stone, with quoins and a stone slate roof. There are two storeys and five bays. On the front are two doorways, various windows, some casements and some fixed, and a blocked segmental-arched cart opening.	II
High Green House; 54.27704°N 1.99968°W	—	Late 18th century	A house with a coach house, later incorporated into the house, in stone with stone slate roofs, and two storeys. The main house has five bays, a plinth, rusticated quoins, shaped kneelers and stone coping. The doorway has a frieze and a modillion cornice, and the windows are sashes, the middle window on the upper floor with a shouldered surround. The former coach house to the right is lower, with two bays. In the centre is a doorway, to the right is a garage door, and the windows are sashes.	II
Littleburn; 54.27236°N 2.00998°W	—	Late 18th to early 19th century	The house is in stone, with rusticated quoins, and a stone slate roof with shaped kneelers and stone coping. There are two storeys and five bays. The central doorway has an architrave and a cornice on consoles, and the windows on the front are casements in architraves. At the rear is a mix of windows, including a sash window, mullioned windows, a mullioned and transomed window, and a round-arched stair window with imposts and keystones.	II
Town Head Farmhouse; 54.27603°N 2.00433°W	—	Late 18th to early 19th century	A pair of houses in roughcast stone, with a stone slate roof, shaped kneelers and moulded stone coping. There are two storeys and three bays. On the front are two doorways and sash windows, all with stone surrounds. At the rear is a round-arched stair window, and mullioned windows. On the right return is a blocked segmental-arched cart shed opening.	II
Warnford Court; 54.27818°N 1.99833°W		1807	The house is in stone on a plinth, with quoins, a floor band, shaped gutter brackets, and a hipped artificial stone slate roof. There are two storeys, and an L-shaped plan, with a front range of three bays and a three-bay rear wing on the right. In the centre is a porch with two Tuscan columns, a wedge-shaped fascia board with a keystone, and a decorative fanlight. The windows are sashes with brick surrounds, those on the ground floor with round-arched heads. On the right return is a round-arched stair window.	II
Coach house, Warnford Court; 54.27821°N 1.99859°W	—	c. 1807	The coach house is in stone, with quoins, and a hipped stone slate roof. There are two storeys and three bays, the middle bay projecting slightly under a pediment. On the middle bay is a coach opening with rusticated chamfered quoins and a segmental arch of voussoirs, above which is a blind Diocletian window. The outer bays contain board doors with casement windows above, and on the left, return steps lead up to a doorway.	II
Garden wall and summerhouse, Warnford Court; 54.27846°N 1.99810°W	—	c. 1807	The wall encloses a garden to the northwest of the house, it is in stone, and about 3 metres (9.8 ft) in height. In the northwest side is an apsidal summerhouse with a stone plaque containing quadrant paterae in the corners and an illegible inscription. To the right are eight bee boles in two tiers.	II
Kennels, Warnford Court; 54.27829°N 1.99880°W	—	1807	The kennels are in stone, with quoins, and a coped parapet. It is in one and two storeys, and has five bays. The building contains a segmental-arched coach opening, a round-arched window above a sash window, and a basket-arched doorway with a chamfered quoined surround, and a dated and initialled lintel. On the upper floor are three triangular pigeon holes.	II
Littleburn Bridge; 54.27224°N 2.00910°W		1814	The bridge carries Westfield Lane over Littleburn Beck. It is in stone, and consists of a single segmental arch. The parapets, which are coped, end in square pedestals with panelled sides and pyramidal tops. On the downstream parapet is a dated stone plaque, and on the upstream parapet is a sandstone plaque with a long inscription.	II
Old Chapel; 54.27679°N 2.00047°W		1823	The former chapel is in stone with a stone slate roof and three bays. The left bay has two storeys and contains a doorway and a sash window on each floor. The right two bays have one storey, and a central doorway with a stone surround flanked by round-arched windows.	II
Grange Cottage, The Grange and farm building 54.27641°N 2.00178°W	—	Early to mid-19th century	A cottage, house and farm building in one range, they are in stone, with quoins, a stone slate roof with a shaped kneeler and stone coping on the right, and two storeys. The cottage on the left has two bays, a doorway with a stone surround, to the left is a sash window in each floor, and a round-arched stair window to the right with imposts and a keystone. The house has three bays, and contains a central doorway and sash windows, all with stone surrounds. The farm building on the right is lower and has two bays.	II
Telephone kiosk 54.27676°N 1.99991°W	—	1935	The telephone kiosk on the village green is of the K6 type designed by Giles Gilbert Scott. Constructed in cast iron with a square plan and a dome, it has three unperforated crowns in the top panels.	II
