= Listed buildings in Newbiggin, south Wensleydale =

Newbiggin is a civil parish in the county of North Yorkshire, England. It contains 14 listed buildings that are recorded in the National Heritage List for England. All the listed buildings are designated at Grade II, the lowest of the three grades, which is applied to "buildings of national importance and special interest". The parish contains the village of Newbiggin and the surrounding area. All the listed buildings are in the village, and consist of houses, cottages and associated structures, farmhouses, a public house and a pinfold.

== Buildings ==
Name and location	Photograph	Date	Notes
Hargarth Cottage; 54.26504°N 2.00762°W	—	17th century	The house is in stone on a plinth, with quoins and a stone slate roof. There are two storeys and three bays. The doorway is to the left, it is flanked by three-light mullioned windows, and the other windows are casements.
Brown's House; 54.26512°N 2.00727°W	—	1670	A house, later used for other purposes, and an outbuilding under one roof, in stone, with a stone slate roof and two storeys. The south front has three bays. It contains mullioned windows, some blocked, and a stable door. At the rear is a window in a blocked doorway with a quoined chamfered surround, and a triangular soffit to the lintel, which has a recessed panel containing the date, initials and a decorative motif.
Town Head Farmhouse and outbuilding 54.26532°N 2.00767°W	—	1690	The house and outbuilding to the southwest are in stone with two storeys. The house has a Welsh slate roof with shaped kneelers and moulded stone coping. There is a T-shaped plan, a front of two bays and a rear wing. In the centre is a gabled porch containing a doorway with a quoined surround, and a cambered head with a moulded arris, and decorative motifs on the spandrels, and on the lintel is a recessed initialled and dated panel. To the left is a segmental bow window, to the right is a fire window and a two-light mullioned window, and the upper floor contains sash windows. The outbuilding has a stone slate roof and two bays, and it contains mullioned windows, with through-stones further to the left.
Bobo's Cottage; 54.26611°N 2.00595°W	—	Late 17th to early 18th century	The cottage is in stone on a plinth, with quoins on the left, and a stone slate roof. There are two storeys and two bays. The doorway is on the right, and the windows are sashes, the ground floor window with a double-chamfered surround.
Brook House Farmhouse; 54.26619°N 2.00578°W	—	Late 17th to early 18th century	A farmhouse and coach house combined into a house, it is in stone with quoins and a stone slate roof. There are two storeys and five bays. In the left bay is the former coach house entrance with a curved lintel and a hood mould, and above it is a casement window. In the middle bay is a projecting two-storey gabled porch containing a doorway with a stone surround, above which is an oculus, and in the left return is a small single-light window. Elsewhere, there is one two-light mullioned window, and the other windows are casements.
Brookside, cottage and former barn 54.26715°N 2.00300°W	—	Late 17th to early 18th century	The buildings are in stone, with quoins, and stone slate roofs with stone coping and shaped kneelers, and two storeys. The house in the centre is the oldest, with two bays, a central doorway with a stone surround on bases, impost blocks, and a lintel with rounded inner corners, and the windows on the front are sashes. At the rear are mullioned windows, and a round-arched stair window. The cottage to the left is dated 1800 and has one bay. It contains a doorway and a casement window on the ground floor. On the upper floor is a two-light mullioned window with a hood mould, under which is a dated and initialled recessed plaque. The barn to the right is dated 1812, and has three bays. In the centre is a segmental-arched cart entrance with voussoirs. The outer bays contain doorways, the lintel of the left door with a dated and initialled recessed plaque, and above are casement windows.
Eastburn Farmhouse and Cottage; 54.26748°N 2.00180°W		Late 17th to early 18th century	A farmhouse and cottage in stone with a Welsh slate roof. There are two storeys and five bays, the cottage in the right bay. The house has an architrave with a keystone, a frieze and a moulded cornice, and the cottage has a simpler doorway. The windows are a mix of casements, sashes and mullioned windows.
The Cottage; 54.26746°N 2.00108°W	—	1717	The house is in stone, and has stone slate roofs with shaped kneelers and moulded copings. There are two storeys and a U-shaped plan, with a front range of two bays and two rear service wings. The doorway has a chamfered quoined surround, an initialled and dated lintel and a cornice. The windows either have fixed lights or are mullioned.
Street Head Inn; 54.26939°N 2.00454°W		Early 18th century	The farm buildings, later extended and converted into a public house, are in painted stone, with quoins, and stone slate roofs with a shaped kneeler and stone coping on the left. The original part has two storeys and two bays, to the left is a single-bay extension, and to the right is a four-bay former farm building. In the original part is a gabled porch, to the right is a segmental-arched former barn doorway with a slab hood mould, and external stone steps. The windows are a mix of sashes, casements and mullioned windows.
Brookside; 54.26761°N 2.00126°W	—	Early to mid-18th century	The house is in stone, partly roughcast, with quoins, and a stone slate roof with a shaped kneeler and stone coping on the left. There are two storeys and two bays. The central doorway has a stone surround and impost blocks, and the windows are casements.
Westbrook House; 54.26631°N 2.00552°W	—	Early to mid-18th century	The house is in stone, with quoins, and a Welsh slate roof with concrete coping on the right. There are two storeys and two bays. The central doorway has a chamfered surround and a hood mould. To the right is a casement window, to the left is a sash window with a hood mould, and the upper floor windows are mullioned.
Pinfold; 54.26674°N 2.00376°W		18th century (probable)	The pinfold is in stone, and has an irregular triangular plan. The walls are about 1 metre (3 ft 3 in) high, and there are openings in the west and south sides.
The Grange; 54.26770°N 2.00020°W	—	Late 18th to early 19th century	A coach house, cottage and house combined into one house, in stone, with a Welsh slate roof and two storeys. The house on the right has three bays, chamfered rusticated quoins in sandstone, a central doorway with a cornice, and sash windows with deep lintels. The cottage to the left has two bays, and contains quoins, a doorway with pilaster capitals, and a lintel with rounded inner corners. The windows are horizontally-sliding sashes. Further to the left is the former coach house, with one bay, containing a doorway under a curved bressumer with a hood mould, and a casement window on the upper floor.
Millscar House, railings, gate piers and gate 54.26685°N 2.00433°W	—	Early 19th century	The house is in roughcast stone, and has a stone slate roof with stone coping and shaped kneelers. There are two storeys and an attic, a double depth plan, and three bays. The central doorway has a moulded architrave, pilasters with bases and capitals, a lintel with rounded corners, a pulvinated frieze and a cornice. The windows on the front are sashes. At the rear is a doorway with a quoined surround and a moulded arris, a two-light mullioned window, and a round-arched stair window with imposts and a keystone. In front of the house are wrought iron spiked railings and a gate, the standards with urn finials, and the gate piers are in stone, slightly chamfer]ed, with ogee caps.
