= Sorrelsykes House =

Historic building in West Burton, North Yorkshire, England

Coordinates: 54°17′23″N 1°57′52″W

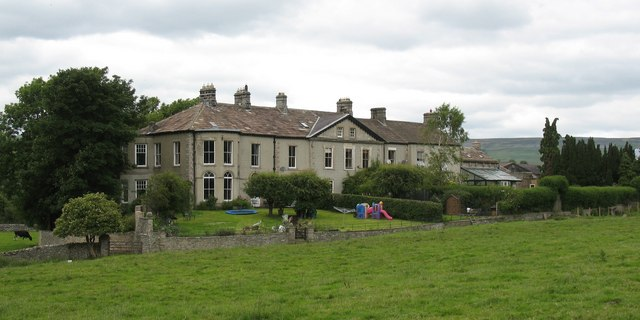
The house, in 2011

Sorrelsykes House is a historic building in West Burton, North Yorkshire, a village in England. It is noted for the follies in its park.

A manor house, named Sorysikes Meadow, was constructed on the site in the early 17th century. It was demolished in the early 19th century, and a new country house was built. It was altered in 1921, with the addition of a block at the rear, giving it a rectangular plan. The building was later divided into four houses, and it was Grade II listed in 1988.

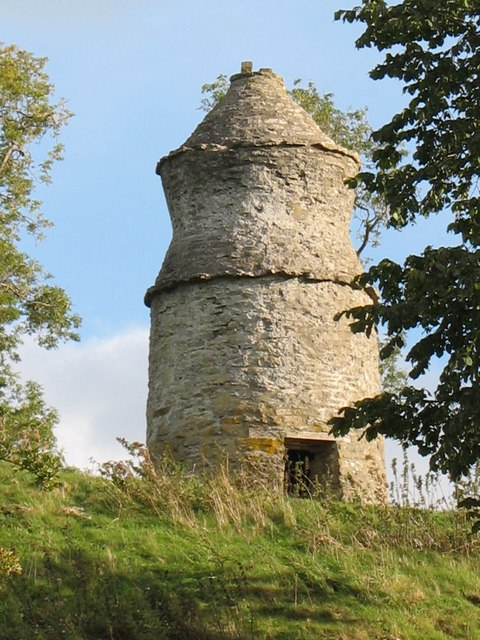
The Pepper Pot

The house is built of stuccoed brick, with quoins, modillion gutter brackets, and a stone slate roof, hipped on the left. There are two storeys, a partial basement and attics, and an east front of nine bays. The middle three bays project under a pediment, and contain a doorway with an architrave and a cornice on consoles. To the left is another doorway containing a fanlight with a chamfered quoined surround and a round-arched architrave. The left bay contains a two-storey canted bay window, and most of the windows are sashes, with a variety of surrounds. In the left return is a semicircular bay window.

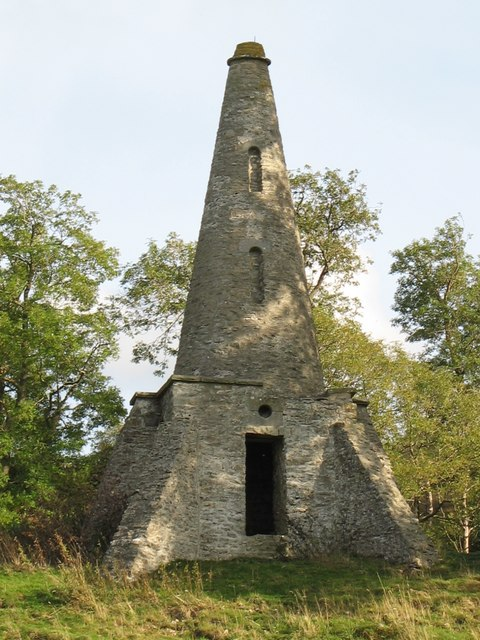
The Rocket Ship

In the parkland around the house are four follies. Their date of construction is uncertain, but they may have been built by four sisters of the Tennant family in the 1870s. At the top of a scree slope is a sham ruin, originally resembling a castle, though it was damaged in a storm in 1992 and little survives. It is said to have been constructed to hide earlier lead mine workings. The other three follies are better preserved, and two are Grade II listed. The Pepper Pot is in stone and has a circular plan. There are two stages, the lower stage slightly tapering, the upper stage concave, each with a projecting top course of stones, surmounted by a conical cap. On the west side is a very small doorway. The Rocket Ship is also built of stone, and has a base in the form of a cube with tapering diagonal buttresses. On the west side is a narrow doorway with a blind oculus above, and at the top is flagged coping. The base is surmounted by a tapering circular obelisk containing two blind round-headed vents and with flagged capping. The unlisted folly is a stone arch, sometimes described as a gateway, but too low to walk through. The follies were restored in 1993.

== See also ==
- Listed buildings in Burton-cum-Walden
