= West Burton, North Yorkshire =

Village in North Yorkshire, England

Coordinates: 54°16′33″N 1°58′29″W

West Burton
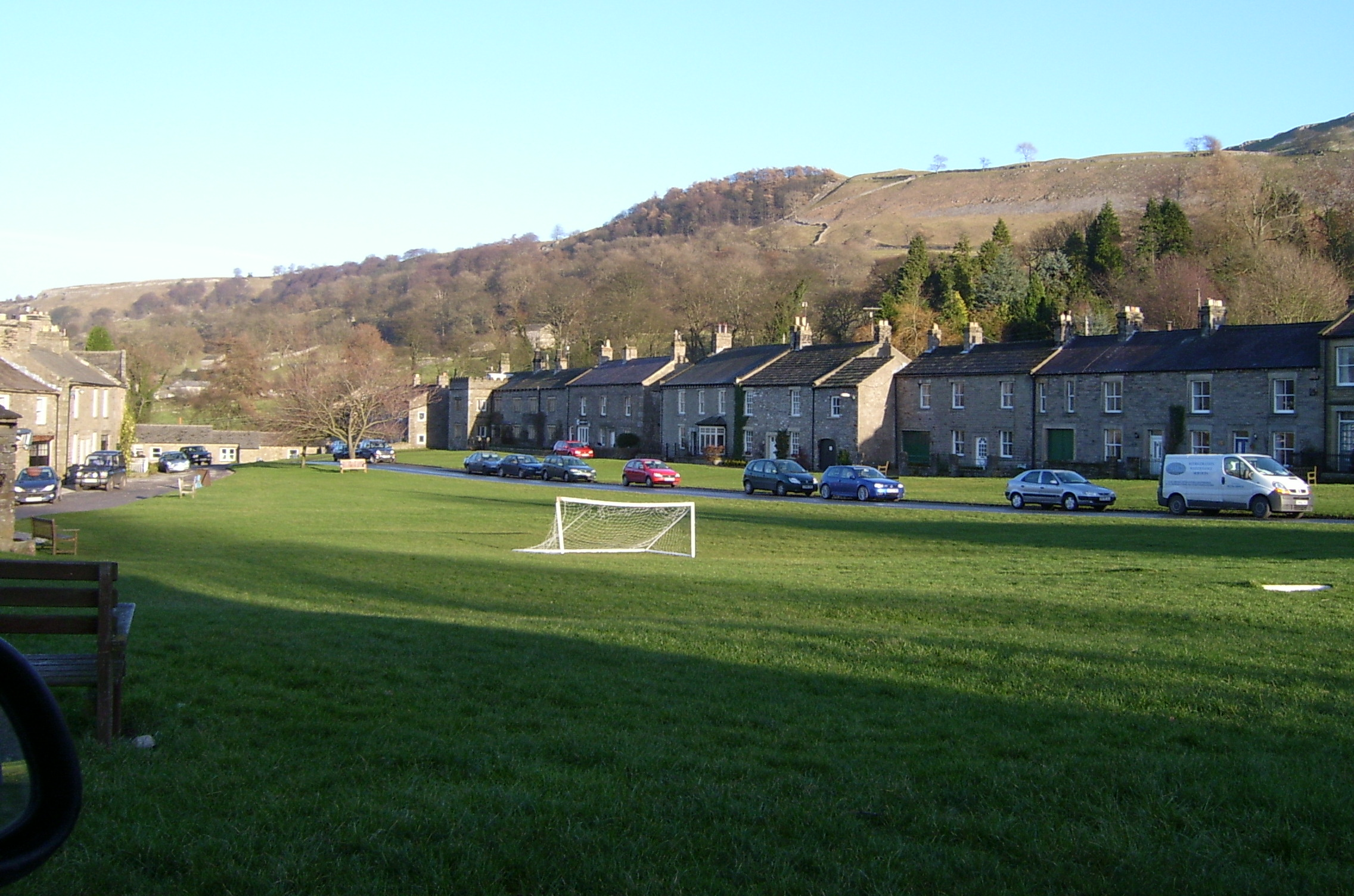
- West Burton village green

- Location within North Yorkshire
- Population: 303 (2011 census)
- OS grid reference: SE018870
- Civil parish: Burton-cum-Walden
- Unitary authority: North Yorkshire
- Ceremonial county: North Yorkshire
- Region: Yorkshire and the Humber
- Country: England
- Sovereign state: United Kingdom
- Post town: LEYBURN
- Postcode district: DL8 4
- Police: North Yorkshire
- Fire: North Yorkshire
- Ambulance: Yorkshire
- UK Parliament: Richmond and Northallerton

West Burton is a village in Bishopdale, a side valley of Wensleydale, in the Yorkshire Dales, North Yorkshire, England. It lies 6.2 miles (10 km) south-west of Leyburn and 22.3 miles (35.9 km) west of the county town of Northallerton. It is the largest settlement in the civil parish of Burton-cum-Walden.

== History ==
There is some evidence of an Iron Age settlement on top of nearby Burton Moor that has been designated a Scheduled Ancient Monument. It consists of about eighteen hut circles and defined fields.

The village is mentioned in the Domesday Book as just Burton. The toponymy of the village is derived from the Old English burh-tūn meaning a fortified farm. Until the 17th century the village was known as Burton in Bishopdale. "West" distinguishes the village from the village of Constable Burton, 9 miles (14 km) to the east, also known simply as Burton in the early Middle Ages, and in the 19th century as Burton-in-Bishopdale.

At the time of the Norman invasion the village was part of the manor belonging to Thorkil, but afterwards the manor was granted to Geoffrey of Swaffham by Count Alan of Brittany, who had been awarded the lands by the Crown. West Burton (or Burton in Bishopdale or Burton-cum-Walden) was a manor or township of the ancient parish of Aysgarth, and was always coupled with Walden. The manor befell the same fate as other lands belonging to Geoffrey in that they eventually passed to Richard Duke of Gloucester in 1480. Thereafter the descent of the manor followed that of Castle Bolton into the 19th century.

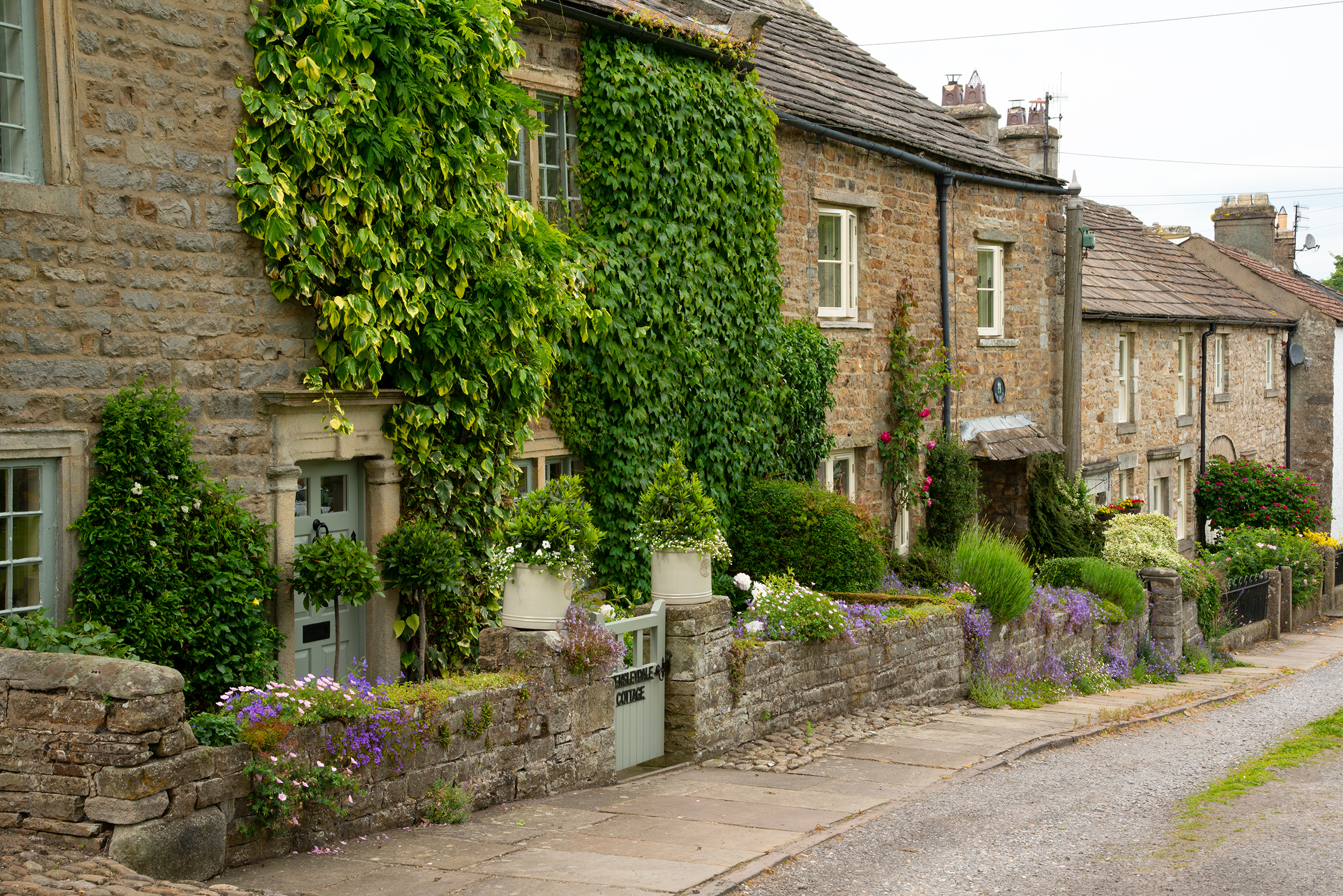
A less frequently photographed row of residences

The village used to be an important local centre and the octagonal West Burton Obelisk and stocks are still seen today on the village green.

Sorrelsykes House, a country house known for the follies in its parkland, lies east of the village.

== Governance ==
Burton-cum-Walden became a separate civil parish in 1866. Burton-cum-Walden Parish Council has five Councillors and a parish clerk.

The village is in the Richmond and Northallerton UK Parliament constituency. From 1974 to 2023 it was part of the district of Richmondshire. It is now administered by the unitary North Yorkshire Council.

== Geography ==
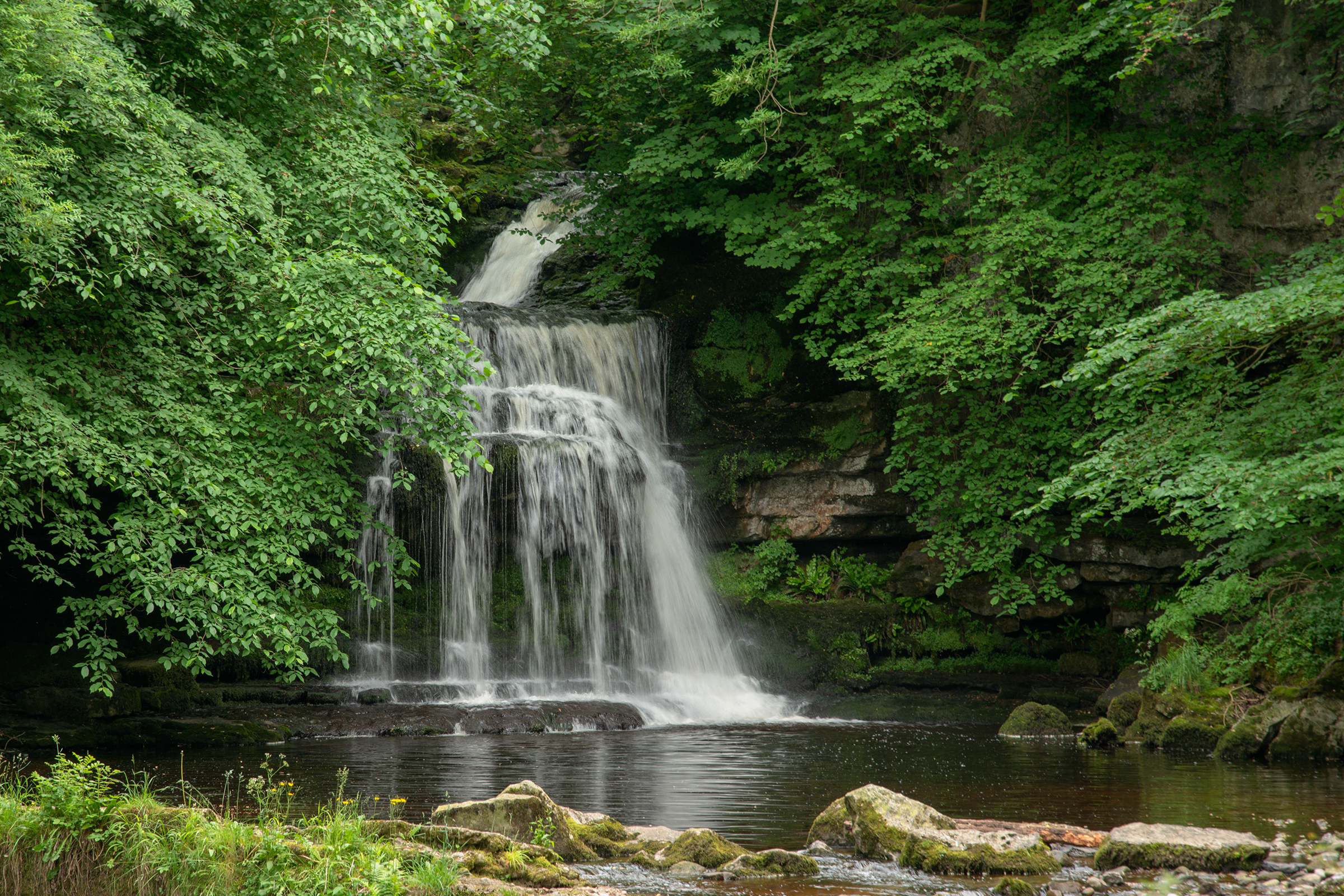
Cauldron Force in early summer

West Burton lies within the Yorkshire Dales National Park on the B6160 road to Addingham. Two other roads leave the village, both dead ends, but one leads to the two hamlets of Walden and Walden Head. The villages of Aysgarth, Newbiggin and Thoralby are all about a mile from the village. West Burton lies near the mouth of Bishopdale and at the mouth of Waldendale, the valley through which Walden Beck runs. Walden Beck runs north past the eastern edge of the village to join Bishopdale Beck on its way to the River Ure. Cauldron Force or Falls, (also called West Burton Falls), is a small waterfall in the village. It is only a short walk from the centre of the green.

== Demography ==
Population figures are for the whole parish of Burton-cum-Walden.

Population
Year	1881	1891	1901	1911	1921	1931	1951	1961	2001	2011
Total	444	425	367	314	385	367	294	266	311	303

=== 2001 census ===
The 2001 UK census showed that the population was split 48.5% male to 51.5% female. The religious constituency was made of 72.3% Christian and the rest stating no religion or not stating at all. The ethnic make-up was 98.7% White British and 1.3% White other. There were 178 dwellings.

=== 2011 census ===
The 2011 UK census showed that the population was split 48.8% male to 51.2% female. The religious constituency was made of 66.7% Christian, 0.3% Jewish, 0.3% Buddhist, 1.6% Hindu and the rest stating no religion or not stating at all. The ethnic make-up was 94.4% White British, 1.3% Mixed Ethnic, 2.3% Asian British and 2.0% each White Other. There were 192 dwellings.

== Community and culture ==
Education in the village is provided at West Burton Primary school. The school was built in 1873. Pupils receive secondary education at The Wensleydale School & Sixth Form in Leyburn. There are a number of local businesses including a butchers shop, a small pottery, general store and a public house.

== Notable people ==
In their retirement, musical theatre actress Pat Kirkwood and her husband Peter Knight, the former president of Bradford & Bingley, lived in the village for ten years.

== Religion ==
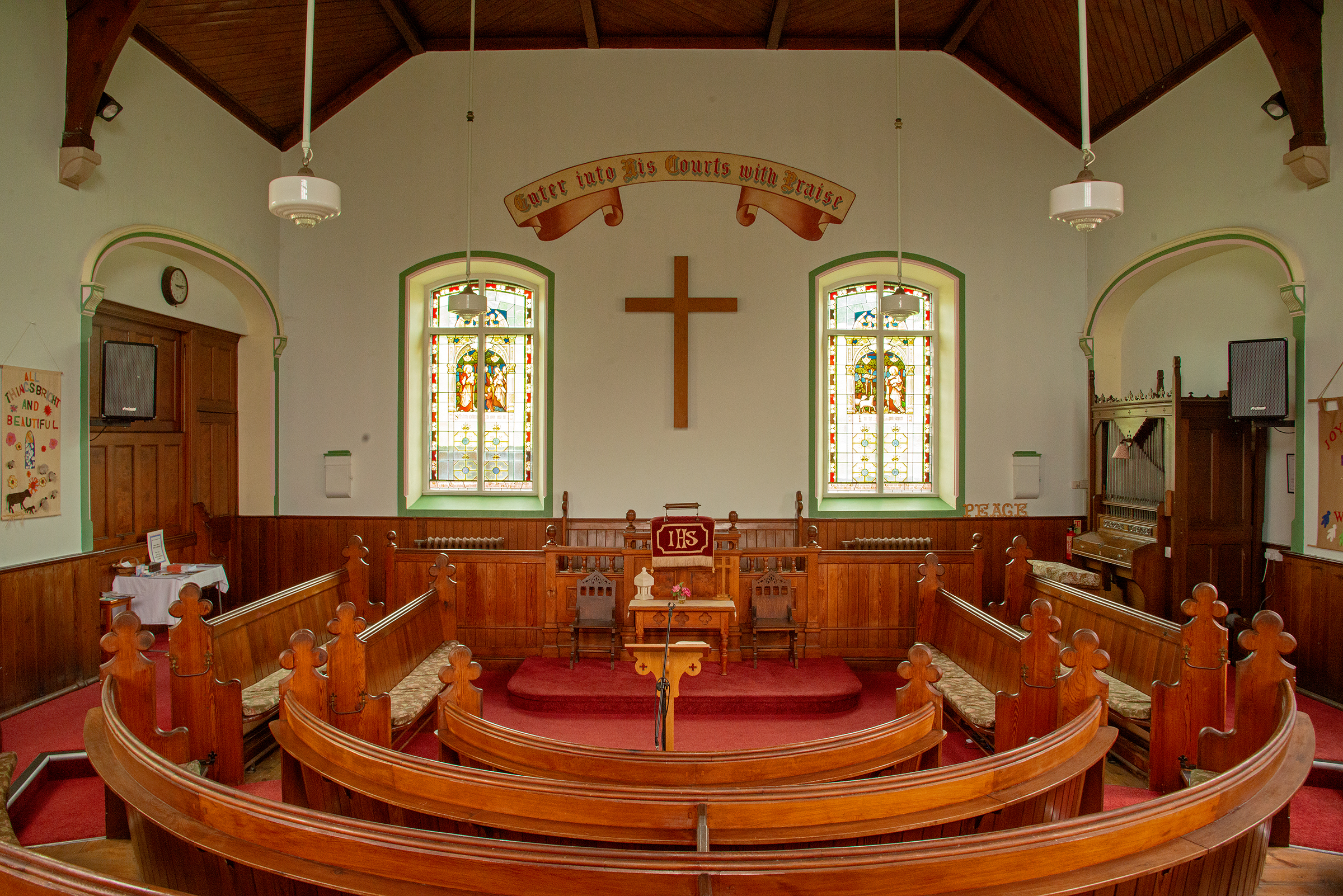
The Methodist Chapel in West Burton, from the back

The Wesleyan and Independent Methodists both built chapels in the village in 1813 and 1851 respectively. The Wesleyan Methodist chapel was rebuilt in 1898.

== See also ==
- Listed buildings in Burton-cum-Walden
