= Street Head Inn =

Pub in Newbiggin, North Yorkshire, England

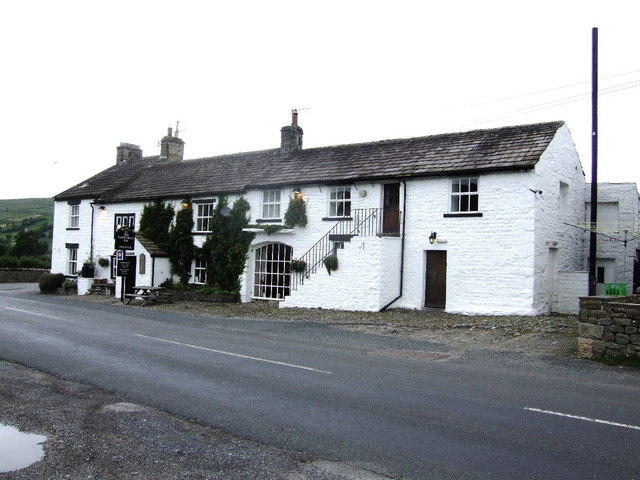
The pub, in 2007

The Street Head Inn is a historic pub in Newbiggin, a village near Aysgarth in North Yorkshire, in England.

The coaching inn was built in about 1730. Later in the century, farmbuildings were added to its right, then in the early 19th century, the inn was extended to its left. The farmbuildings were later incorporated into the pub. The building was grade II listed in 1969. The pub contains a large dining room, with exposed wooden beams. In 2023, the Yorkshire Post named it as one of the best historic pubs in the Yorkshire Dales.

The pub is built of painted stone, with quoins, and stone slate roofs with a shaped kneeler and stone coping on the left. The original part has two storeys and two bays, to the left is the single-bay extension, and to the right is the four-bay former farm building. In the original part is a gabled porch, to the right is a segmental-arched former barn doorway with a slab hood mould, and external stone steps. The windows are a mix of sashes, casements and mullioned windows. In the dining room is a stone fireplace dating from about 1800.

== See also ==
- Listed buildings in Newbiggin, south Wensleydale
