= Thoralby =

Village and civil parish in North Yorkshire, England

Coordinates: 54°16′37″N 1°59′59″W

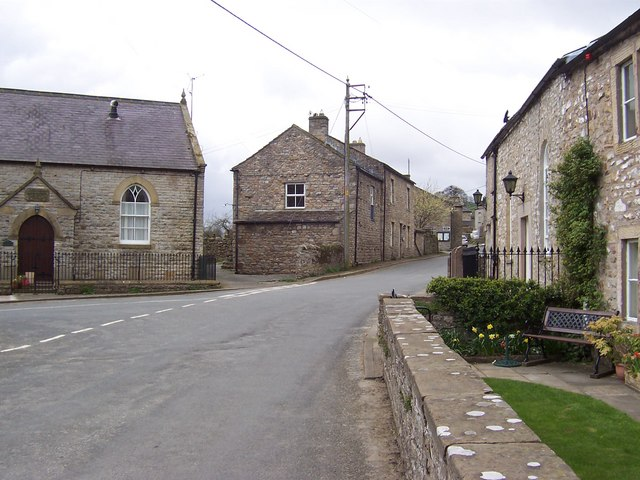
- Thoralby

- Location within North Yorkshire
- Population: 145
- OS grid reference: SE001867
- Unitary authority: North Yorkshire
- Ceremonial county: North Yorkshire
- Region: Yorkshire and the Humber
- Country: England
- Sovereign state: United Kingdom
- Post town: LEYBURN
- Postcode district: DL8
- Police: North Yorkshire
- Fire: North Yorkshire
- Ambulance: Yorkshire
- UK Parliament: Richmond and Northallerton

Thoralby is a village and civil parish in the county of North Yorkshire, England. It lies south of Aysgarth, is within a mile of both Newbiggin and West Burton and is in the Yorkshire Dales National Park. It is 23.5 miles (37.8 km) south-west of the county town of Northallerton.

== History ==
The village is mentioned in Domesday Book as Turoldesbi. After the Norman invasion the lands were awarded to Count Alan of Brittany, who granted the local manor to Bernwulf, who had held the manor before that. The manor was eventually acquired by the lords of Middleham, whose descent it then followed until the Middleham manor holdings were sold piecemeal by commissioners of the Crown in the mid-17th century. The manor of Thoralby was purchased by the Norton family. By the middle of the 18th century, it had passed to the Purchas family.

On Thoralby Common the remains of lead mines and quarries are still visible, indicating the industrial past of the area. There has also been a mill here since at least 1298. There used to be both Wesleyan and Primitive Methodist chapels in the village. The Wesleyan Chapel was built in 1823 and rebuilt in 1890. The Primitive Methodist Chapel was erected in 1849. Both are now private properties.

Thoralby was described in the Imperial Gazetteer of England and Wales in 1870–72 as:

- " A township in Aysgarth parish, N. R. Yorkshire; 4½ miles SE of Askrigg. It has a post-office under Bedale. Acres, 2,840. Real property, £2,542. Pop., 271. Houses, 63."

The toponymy of the village name is derived from combining the Old Norse words of Thoraldr, a person's name, and bi, farm, to give the meaning Thoraldr's farm.

== Governance ==
The village is in the Richmond and Northallerton UK Parliament constituency. From 1974 to 2023 it was part of the district of Richmondshire, it is now administered by the unitary North Yorkshire Council.

The civil parish shares a grouped parish council, the Aysgarth & District Parish Council, with Aysgarth, Bishopdale, Newbiggin and Thornton Rust.

== Geography ==
The village is located between Littleburn Beck to the south-west and Heaning Gill to the north–east on the north bank of Bishopdale Beck. The B6160 road runs parallel to the village on the south bank of the beck. It lies south of Aysgarth, within a mile of both Newbiggin and West Burton.

== Community and culture ==
North Yorkshire Council provides three bus routes through the village Monday-Saturday. The village hall provides a space for residents to hold functions, sporting events, charity-based projects and parish-council meetings. It became a registered charity on 22 April 1993, to provide services to the public and charitable events. An annual fete takes place on the first Sunday in August and includes egg throwing, fell running and various other entertainments. The fete raises funds for the village hall. The George Inn lies in the village, as does a general store incorporating the post office. There are 26 Grade-II-listed buildings in the village, which include the old chapel, post office and public house, while Thoralby Old Hall is grade II* listed.

== Demography ==
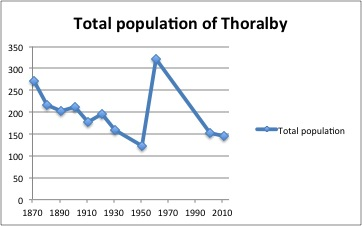
A line graph of the total population of Thoralby using census data

The population of Thoralby has fluctuated over time and this can be seen from the census results. In 1961 Thoralby hit its population peak of a total of 322, a significant increase from the 1951 census data, which showed just 123 residents, the lowest number on record.

=== 2001 census ===
The 2001 UK census showed that the population was split 44.7% male to 55.3% female. The religious constituency was made of 84.4% Christian, 1.9% Jewish and the rest stating no religion or not stating at all. The ethnic make-up was 100% White British. There were 95 dwellings.

=== 2011 census ===
The 2011 UK census showed that the population was split 50% male to 50% female. The religious constituency was made of 69.6% Christian and the rest stating no religion or not stating at all. The ethnic make-up was 99.31% White British and 0.69% White Other. There were 101 dwellings.

== Popular culture ==
Thoralby was featured in the British television series All Creatures Great and Small in the episode 'If Music Be the Food of Love'.

== See also ==
- Listed buildings in Thoralby
