= Newbiggin, south Wensleydale =

Village and civil parish in North Yorkshire, England

Coordinates: 54.26929°N 2.00449°W

Newbiggin
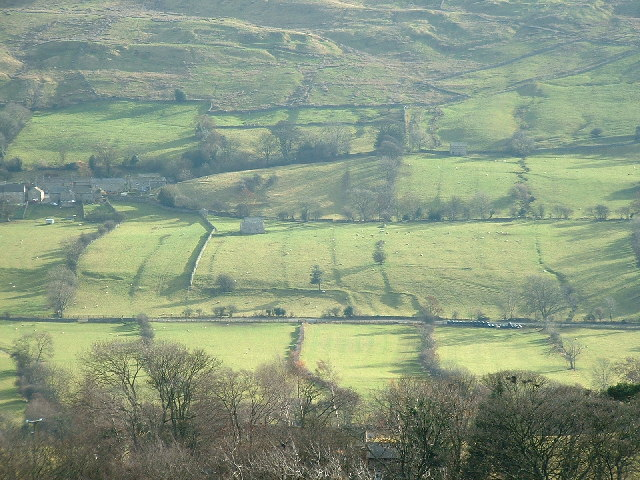
- Looking over Bishopdale to the east end of Newbiggin

- Location within North Yorkshire
- OS grid reference: SD998859
- Unitary authority: North Yorkshire
- Ceremonial county: North Yorkshire
- Region: Yorkshire and the Humber
- Country: England
- Sovereign state: United Kingdom
- Post town: Leyburn
- Postcode district: DL8
- Police: North Yorkshire
- Fire: North Yorkshire
- Ambulance: Yorkshire
- UK Parliament: Richmond and Northallerton

Newbiggin is a village and civil parish in Bishopdale, a side dale on the south side of Wensleydale, in the Yorkshire Dales in North Yorkshire, England. The population was estimated at 80 in 2012.

The name Newbiggin derived from the words 'niwe', which is Old English for 'new' and 'bigging', a word from Middle English, said to mean 'building'. This translates to New Building in today's language.

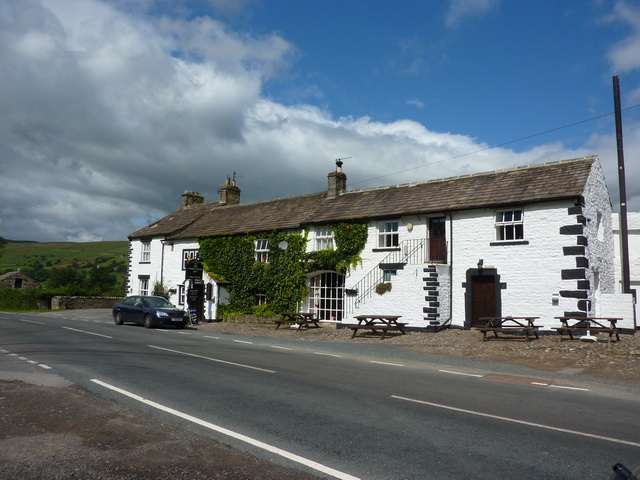
The Street Head Inn, Newbiggin

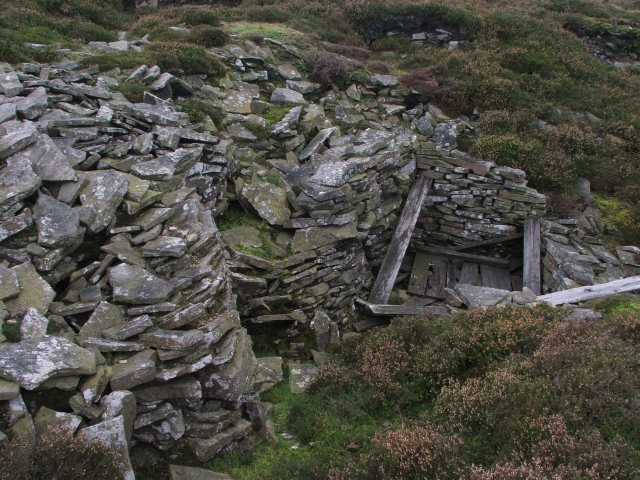
Disused Lead Workings on Wassett Fell

== History ==
Newbiggin once belonged to Jervaulx Abbey.

Newbiggin is home to a number of 18th-century houses, one of the more notable ones is in the north end of the parish. This house in particular has a doorway which is said to have: "a cambered lintel with a quatrefoil in each angle and moulded jambs". Above this door there is an inscription dated 1636. This dates the house back almost 400 years now, and some of its key features such as its original three light mullioned window still remains to this day.

Furthermore, there was once a school, named 'The Free School' in Newbiggin which was founded by Elizabeth Withay in the year 1748. This was endowed with 3 acres of land, and rented at £7 a year. This would equate to around £596.12 in 2005.

On 5 July 2014, the Tour de France Stage 1 from Leeds to Harrogate passed through the village. It was also the location for the first intermediate stage sprint, at the 70 kilometres (43 mi) point, won by Jens Voigt of Trek Factory Racing.

== Governance ==
Newbiggin was a township of the ancient parish of Aysgarth, and became a separate civil parish in 1866. It now shares a grouped parish council, the Aysgarth & District Parish Council, with Aysgarth, Bishopdale, Thoralby and Thornton Rust.

From 1974 to 2023 it was part of the district of Richmondshire, it is now administered by the unitary North Yorkshire Council.

== Population ==
Newbiggin has had a relatively small population throughout history. At the 2011 census the combined population of the parishes of Newbiggin and Bishopdale parishes was 108, of which Newbiggin was estimated at 80 and Bishopdale at 30. In 1881 the population of Newbiggin was only 60 people. The average age of the population is also relatively high, with 46.3% of those living there being 60 or over and the mean age being 53.5. Of the total population who are aged 16–74, there are 31 people who are economically active (both part-time and full-time). Strangely enough, all of these 31 are actually self-employed.

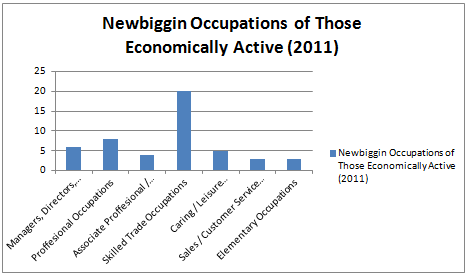
Newbiggin Occupations of Those Economically Active

== Health and education ==
Newbiggin is home mainly to the older population, with just under half of its population being under the age of 60. The majority of those living there are healthy with no long lasting illnesses that restrict them, however, nine of those living there are subject to long lasting illnesses that limit them in the long term. There are only 4 full-time students living in Newbiggin, and therefore there are no schools in the area itself. However, just 1.2 miles away, West Burton Church of England Primary School is the closest for primary children, and around 8 miles away, The Wensleydale School and Sixth Form, would be the closest school for the elder children and teenagers.

== Transport ==
Newbiggin has no public transport that enters the parish. The nearest village with a bus service is Worton, around a 20–25-minute walk away. The nearest railway station to Newbiggin is Garsdale railway station which is 10.3 miles (16.6 km) away.

== See also ==
- Listed buildings in Newbiggin, south Wensleydale
