= Listed buildings in Bishopdale, North Yorkshire =

Bishopdale is a civil parish in the county of North Yorkshire, England. It contains ten listed buildings that are recorded in the National Heritage List for England. Two of these are listed at Grade II*, the middle of the three grades, while the others are at Grade II, the lowest grade. The parish is entirely rural and does not contain settlements of any significant size. Apart from a bridge, all the listed buildings are farmhouses and associated farm buildings.

== Key ==
Grade	Criteria
II*	Particularly important buildings of more than special interest
II	Buildings of national importance and special interest

== Buildings ==
Name and location	Photograph	Date	Notes	Grade
New House, farmhouse and outbuildings 54.24870°N 2.05477°W		1635	The farmhouse and outbuildings are under one roof, in stone with a stone slate roof. The house has two storeys and a T-shaped plan, consisting of a range of four bays and a rear projection. The doorway has an ogee-moulded surround and a triangular head set in square quatrefoils in the spandrels, and above it is a dated and initialled inscription. The window above the doorway has a single light with an ogee head, and the other windows are double-chamfered and mullioned, those in the ground floor under a continuous hood mould. The outbuilding to the left has three bays, and contains segmental-headed barn doors with chamfered quoined jambs, a stable door, and steps to an upper-storey doorway.	II
Dale Foot; 54.25353°N 2.03316°W		1640	A stone farmhouse with quoins and a stone slate roof. There are two storeys and an T-shaped plan, with a front range of four bays and a rear stair turret. On the front is a doorway with a quoined chamfered surround, above which is a dated and initialled panel with decorative motifs, and to the left is a blocked doorway. In the second bay are fire windows with chamfered surrounds, flat-headed in the ground floor and with a round head above. The other windows are double-chamfered and mullioned, and in the ground floor is a continuous hood mould stepped up over the doorway.	II
Longridge Farmhouse and outbuilding 54.24436°N 2.06220°W	—	1653	The farmhouse and outbuilding to the left are in stone with a string course and a stone slate roof. There are two storeys, three bays, and a rear outshut. The middle bay projects as a two-storey gabled porch containing a doorway with a quoined surround, a moulded arris and a triangular head, over which is an initialled and dated inscription. The inner doorway has a similar inscription on sunken spandrels. On the returns of the porch are round-headed windows with a chamfered surround, and elsewhere are double-chamfered mullioned windows, some with hood moulds.	II*
Ribba Hall and outbuilding 54.24731°N 2.05206°W		Late 17th century	The farmhouse and outbuilding are in stone with a stone slate roof and two storeys. The house has two bays and a later gabled extension. In the centre is a doorway with a chamfered quoined surround, and the windows are double-chamfered and mullioned. The outbuilding to the left has external steps leading up to a doorway with an adjacent casement window.	II
Myers Garth; 54.24495°N 2.05472°W		Late 17th to early 18th century	The farmhouse, which was later extended, is in stone with quoins. There are two storeys, four bays, and a central projecting stair wing at the rear. The windows are a mix, consisting of sashes, casements and chamfered mullioned windows. At the rear is a doorway with a chamfered surround and interrupted jambs.	II
New House Gill Cottage; 54.24977°N 2.04161°W	—	Late 17th to early 18th century	A farmhouse, later a private house, in stone, with quoins, and a stone slate roof, coped on the left. There are two storeys, and a T-shaped plan, consisting of a range of two bays and a rear projecting lean-to. The central doorway has a chamfered quoined surround. Most of the windows are mullioned, some are also chamfered, those in the lower floor with hood moulds, and there is a small fire window.	II
Smelter Farmhouse; 54.24152°N 2.05593°W		1701	The farmhouse is in stone with quoins, and a stone slate roof with stone coping and shaped kneelers. There are two storeys and an irregular U-shaped plan, with a front range of three bays, a rear wing on the left, and a shorter staircase wing on the right. The central doorway has an elaborately moulded surround, the inner moulding forming a stepped head with the date and initials on the spandrels. Above is a pulvinated frieze and a segmental pediment. The window over the doorway has a single light with a stepped head, there is an oval fire window, and elsewhere are double-chamfered mullioned windows, some with segmental-arched lights, and some with hood moulds.	II*
Howgill farmhouse and outbuildings 54.23167°N 2.06262°W		Early 18th century	A farmhouse flanked by outbuildings in stone with quoins and a stone slate roof. The house, in the centre, has two bays and a T-shaped plan, with a later gabled rear wing. In the centre is a doorway, the windows in the original block are mullioned, and in the rear wing are sash windows. The right outbuilding has external steps leading to an upper floor doorway. In the right outbuilding are doorways and shuttered upper floor openings.	II
Dale Head; 54.22683°N 2.06816°W		Early to mid 18th century	The farmhouse is in stone with quoins and a stone slate roof. There are two storeys, two bays, and a rear outshut. The central doorway has a basket-arched architrave, and the windows are mullioned with slightly-chamfered surrounds. At the rear of the outshut is a mullioned and transomed stair window.	II
Bridge near Myers Garth; 54.24541°N 2.05548°W	—	Early to mid 19th century	The bridge carries a farm track over Bishopdale Beck. It is in stone, and consists of a single segmental arch with evenly-sized voussoirs, s\ lab hood mould, and parapets with rounded coping, ending in rounded bollards.	II
