= Thoralby Old Hall =

House in Thoralby, North Yorkshire, England

Coordinates: 54.2750°N 2.0090°W

Thoralby Old Hall is a historic building in Thoralby, a village in North Yorkshire, in England.

The manor house was built in 1641, an early example of a "double pile" house - two rooms deep - and all the rooms are of equal size. The building later served as a farmhouse. It was grade II* listed in 1969.

The house is built of stone, with quoins, and a stone slate roof with shaped kneelers, moulded stone coping and obelisk finials. It has two storeys, a double depth plan and three bays. In the centre is a two-storey gabled porch containing a doorway with a chamfered quoined surround, and a Tudor arched head with initials in the spandrels, and a lintel containing a recessed panel with the date and motifs, and a hood mould. Most of the windows are mullioned, some with hood moulds. Inside, there is an inglenook fireplace. Inside, some early fireplaces and doorways survive.

== See also ==
- Grade II* listed buildings in North Yorkshire (district)
- Listed buildings in Thoralby
