= Ellerbeck =

Village and civil parish in North Yorkshire, England

Coordinates: 54.36405°N 1.33631°W

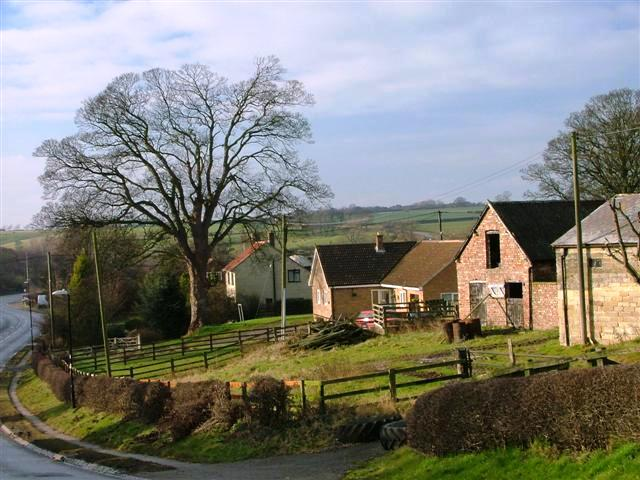
- Looking west through Ellerbeck

- Location within North Yorkshire
- Population: 50 (2015) NYCC
- OS grid reference: SE 432 967
- Civil parish: Ellerbeck
- Unitary authority: North Yorkshire
- Ceremonial county: North Yorkshire
- Region: Yorkshire and the Humber
- Country: England
- Sovereign state: United Kingdom
- Post town: NORTHALLERTON
- Postcode district: DL6
- Police: North Yorkshire
- Fire: North Yorkshire
- Ambulance: Yorkshire

Ellerbeck is a small village and civil parish in North Yorkshire, England. The population of the parish was estimated at 50 in 2011 and 2011. As the population taken at the 2011 Census remained less than 100, the details are maintained in the civil parish of Winton, Stank and Hallikeld.

Ellerbeck lies on the A684 road between Northallerton and the A19 near Osmotherley. Ellerbeck also lies on the route of one of the variations of the Coast to coast walk. From 1974 to 2023 it was part of the Hambleton District, it is now administered by the unitary North Yorkshire Council.

Cod Beck flows through Ellerbeck on its way down into the Vale of Mowbray from the North York Moors.

The village of Elrebec is mentioned in the Domesday Book as having two ploughlands and being the property of Ligulf in 1066, but King William in 1086. The name was recorded as either Elrebec or Alrebec and means Alder Brook.

There was a violent gas explosion in Ellerbeck in the late 1990s which destroyed a house in the village but did not cause any deaths.
