= Bishopdale, North Yorkshire =

Valley in North Yorkshire, England

Coordinates: 54.232°N 2.067°W

Bishopdale
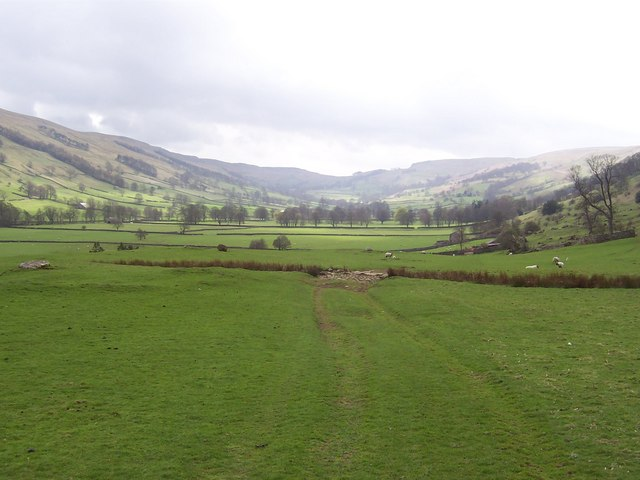
- Upper Bishopdale, looking south-west towards Kidstones Pass

- Location within North Yorkshire
- OS grid reference: SD956818
- Unitary authority: North Yorkshire
- Ceremonial county: North Yorkshire
- Region: Yorkshire and the Humber
- Country: England
- Sovereign state: United Kingdom
- Post town: LEYBURN
- Postcode district: DL8
- Police: North Yorkshire
- Fire: North Yorkshire
- Ambulance: Yorkshire
- UK Parliament: Richmond and Northallerton

Bishopdale is a dale in the Yorkshire Dales National Park in North Yorkshire, England. The dale is a side dale on the south side of Wensleydale, and extends for some 6 miles (10 km) south west from Aysgarth. Bishopdale is also the name of a civil parish, which includes only the sparsely populated upper reaches of the dale, from the head of the dale as far downstream as Howesyke and Howgill Gill.

== Geography ==
There are three villages in the dale, all in its lower part: West Burton, Thoralby and Newbiggin. The Bishopdale Beck flows through the dale to join the River Ure about 1.1 miles (1.8 km) east of Aysgarth. The B6160 road follows the path of the river from its junction with the A684 to the watershed at Kidstones Pass where it continues to Cray and Buckden in Upper Wharfedale. The highest point in the dale on the road is to be found at Kidstones, some 425 metres (1,394 ft) above sea level.

The dale is divided between four civil parishes, Bishopdale, Newbiggin, Thoralby and the northern part of Burton-cum-Walden (which includes the largest village, West Burton). The populations of the four parishes were estimated in 2012 at:

Bishopdale	30
Newbiggin	80
Thoralby	160
Burton-cum-Walden	290

From 1974 to 2023 it was part of the district of Richmondshire, it is now administered by the unitary North Yorkshire Council.

== Civil parish of Bishopdale ==
Bishopdale civil parish includes only the sparsely populated upper reaches of the dale. It extends from the head of the dale as far downstream as Howesyke and Howgill Gill. The civil parish of Bishopdale was a township of the ancient parish of Aysgarth, and became a separate civil parish in 1866. It now shares a grouped parish council, the Aysgarth & District Parish Council, with Aysgarth, Newbiggin, Thoralby and Thornton Rust.

== See also ==
- Listed buildings in Bishopdale, North Yorkshire
