= Burton-cum-Walden =

Civil parish in North Yorkshire, England

Coordinates: 54.2491°N 1.9845°W

- Civil parish
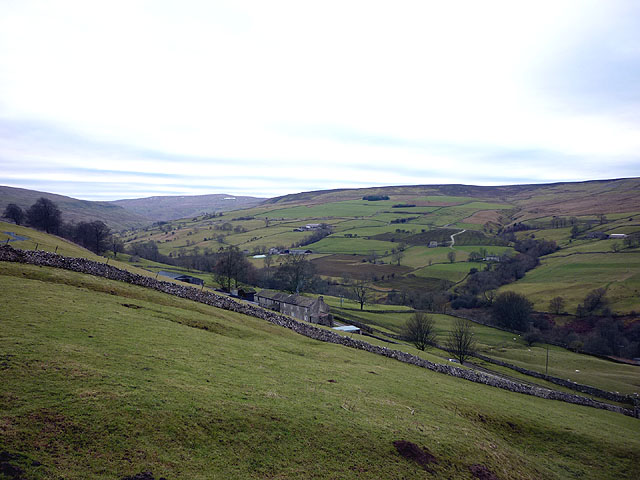
- Looking up Waldendale

- Population: 303 (2011 census)
- OS grid reference: SE011837
- Civil parish: Burton-cum-Walden
- Unitary authority: North Yorkshire
- Ceremonial county: North Yorkshire
- Region: Yorkshire and the Humber
- Country: England
- Sovereign state: United Kingdom
- Post town: BEDALE, HAWES, LEYBURN
- Postcode district: DL8
- Police: North Yorkshire
- Fire: North Yorkshire
- Ambulance: Yorkshire

Burton-cum-Walden is a civil parish in North Yorkshire, England, in the Yorkshire Dales National Park. It had a population of 303 according to the 2011 census.

From 1974 to 2023 it was part of the district of Richmondshire. It is now administered by the unitary North Yorkshire Council.

The parish boundary is defined by the slopes of the Walden Beck valley (sometimes known as Waldendale). The western boundary runs from the outskirts of Aysgarth over Naughtberry Hill to Buckden Pike. The eastern boundary runs from the A684 over the top of Penhill and Harland Hill towards Buckden Pike. The parish includes the village of West Burton and the hamlets of Walden and Walden Head.

== See also ==
- Listed buildings in Burton-cum-Walden
