= Pre-Construct Archaeology =

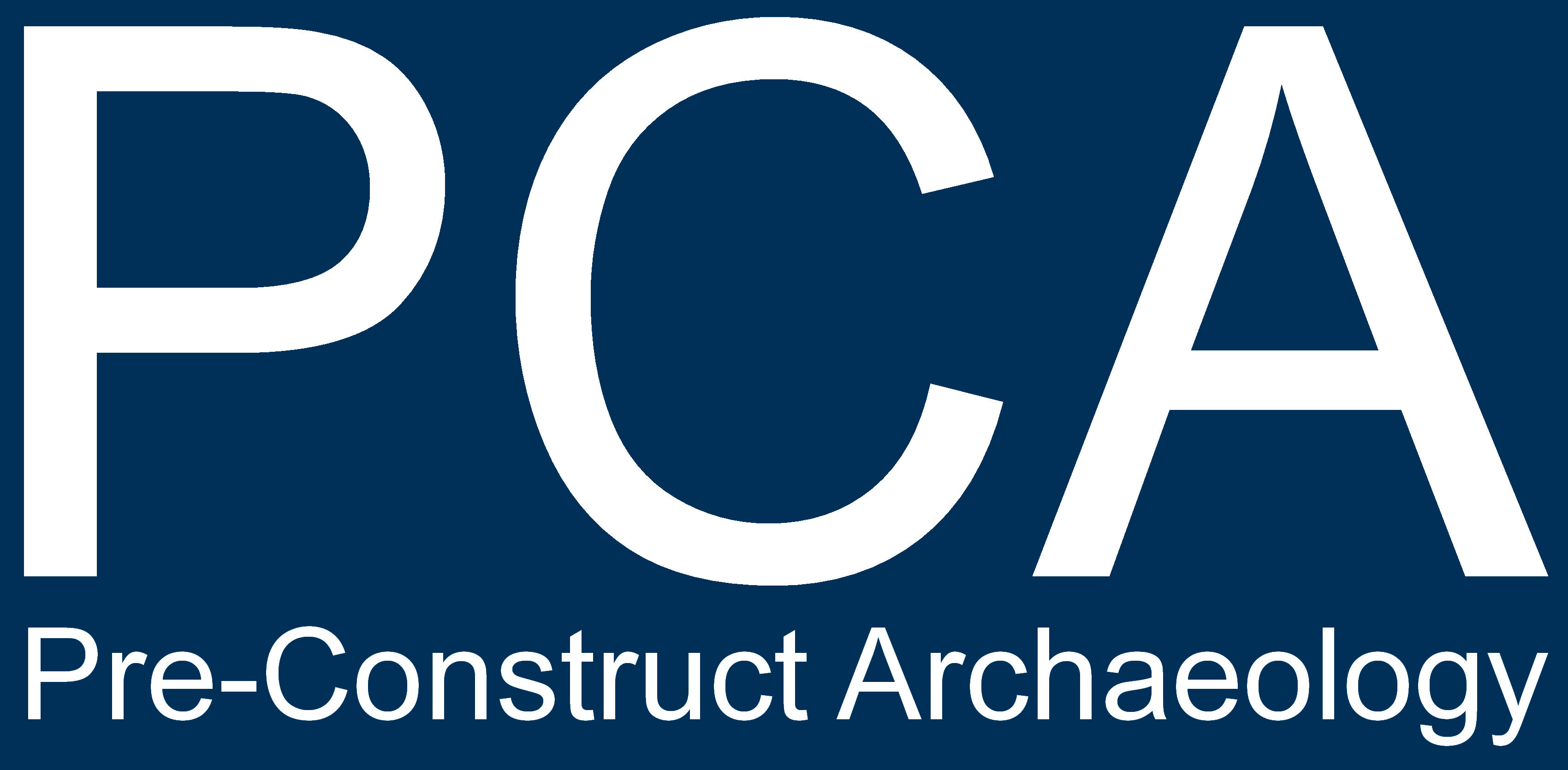
- Founded: 1993; 32 years ago
- Headquarters: United Kingdom
- Key people: Gary Brown (Managing Director) retired
- Number of employees: c. 80-250 (-20)
- Website: pre-construct.com

Pre-Construct Archaeology Limited is a company specialising in providing appropriate solutions to heritage problems.

== History ==
Pre-Construct Archaeology (PCA) was formed in 1993 as a partnership and was located in Lincoln, but also operated in Greater London. The partners were Gary Brown, Brian Simmons and Colin Palmer Brown. Gary Brown, who was based in London, left the partnership in 1995 and retained the name which he conceived, operating from this date as a sole trader. In 1996 Peter Moore and Dr Frank Meddens joined the organisation as Project Managers, followed a year later by Josephine Brown.

In March 1998 the legal status changed again with the organisation becoming a Limited Company the Directors of which are Gary Brown, Peter Moore, Dr Frank Meddens, and Josephine Brown.

In 1997 the organisation opened a second office in Durham managed by Robin Taylor-Wilson, who was later made a non-share holding Director. Further offices have been opened in Cambridge (PCA Central), Winchester (PCA West), both 2011 and Market Harborough (PCA Midlands) 2012. The company has expanded further and as of 2017 it operates from the seven offices: London, Cambridge, Norwich, Durham, Newark, Warwick and Winchester.

At the 2004 British Archaeological Awards, Pre-Construct were highly commended in the 'Developer Funded Archaeology' category for two excavations of Roman sites in London. An Immense and Exceedingly Commodious Goods Station (published by PCA and written by Rebecca Haslam and Guy Thompson) won the 'Archaeological Report Award' at the 2017 Association for Industrial Archaeology Awards, the 2018 London Archaeologist Publication Prize, and was one of the 2019 Railway and Canal Historical Society Transport History Book of the Year Awards.
