= Cauldron Falls (North Yorkshire) =

Waterfall in North Yorkshire, England

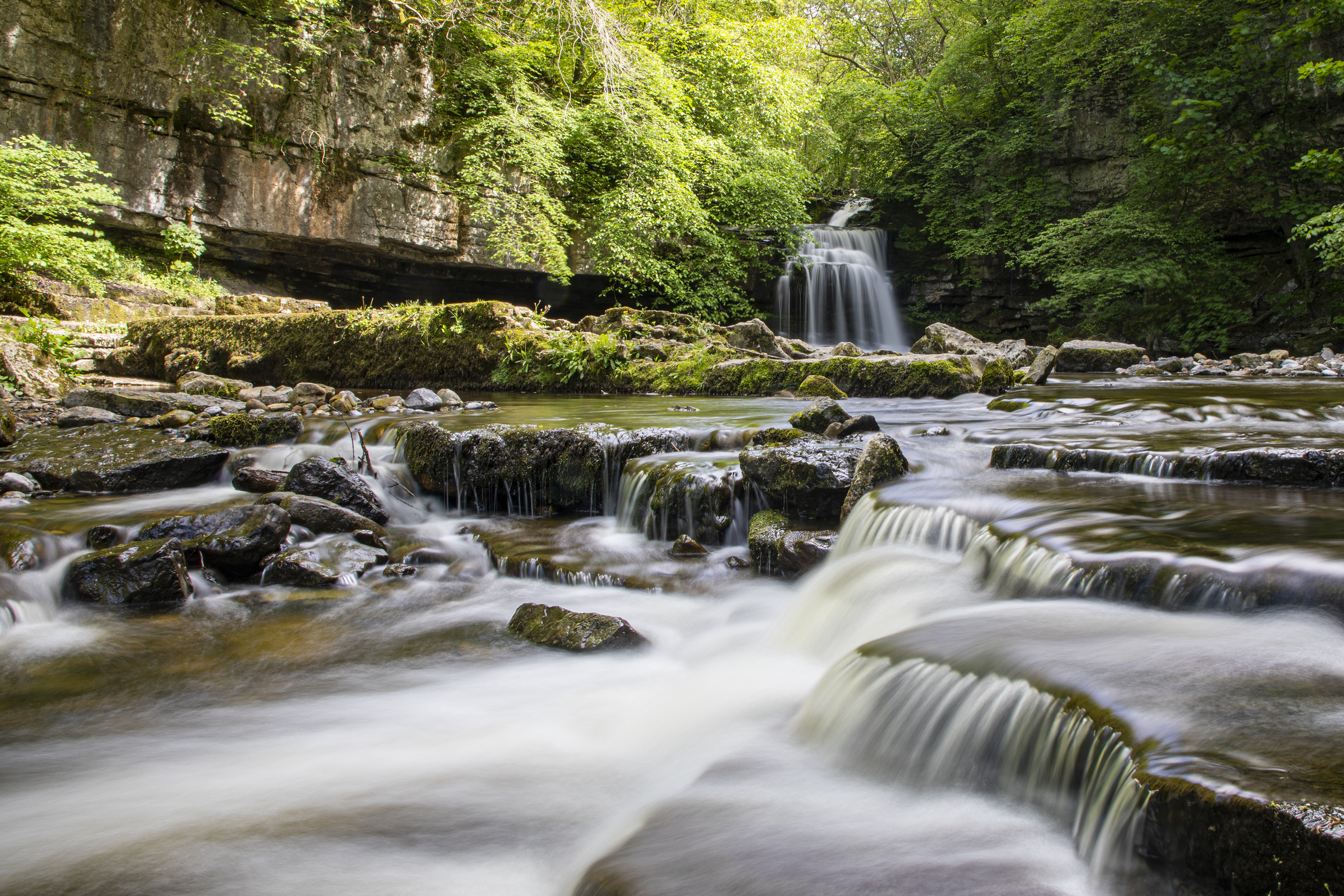
- The waterfall at West Burton
- Location: West Burton, North Yorkshire, England
- Coordinates: 54.275°N 1.971°W
- Watercourse: Walden Beck

Cauldron Falls (also known as West Burton Falls), is a series of waterfalls on Walden Beck in the village of West Burton, North Yorkshire, England. It is known as Cauldron Falls due to the swirls in the plunge pools beneath the cascades of the waterfall. The beck continues on underneath a packhorse bridge where there is another cascade.

== Description ==
The waterfall is located on the Walden Beck, a tributary of the River Ure, in West Burton, which traverses a fault in the bed of the shelving rock. The initial step of the waterfall is a steep cascade which flows east, then immediately south into a plunge pool, the section under the packhorse bridge then cascades into another pool. The first drop falls 20 feet (6 m), and is sometimes referred to as Upper Cauldron Falls. The upper falls section is surround by a north-facing "limestone amphitheatre", over which the water falls. The lower section of the falls travel under a stone bridge known locally as Blue Bridge.

The name Cauldron Falls, refers to the swirling effect of the water in the plunge pool below the main waterfall. The limestone was carved out by the movement of ice across the valley sideways, rather than the effect of melting ice running over it.

J. M. W. Turner painted the falls when he travelled through Wensleydale in 1816.

== See also ==
- List of waterfalls
- List of waterfalls in England
