= Bishopdale Beck =

Stream in North Yorkshire, England

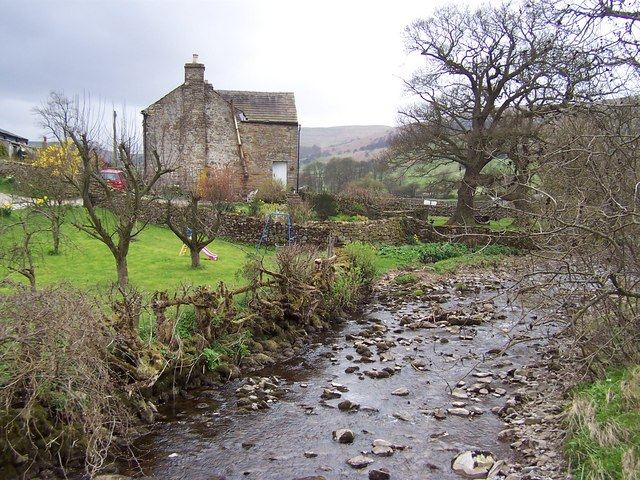
- Bishopdale Beck by Ribba Hall

- Location of the mouth within North Yorkshire

Location
- Country: England
- County: North Yorkshire
- Unitary authority: North Yorkshire

Physical characteristics
- Source
  - location: Causeway Moss
- Mouth
  - location: River Ure at Froddle Dub, Aysgarth
  - coordinates: 54.2986°N 1.96°W
- Length: 15 km (9.3 mi)

Bishopdale Beck is a major tributary of the River Ure in North Yorkshire, England. The beck flows down Bishopdale, a side valley of Wensleydale in the Yorkshire Dales.

It starts life at Causeway Moss, a flat pass that leads over to Wharfedale from Bishopdale. Small streams join the beck from the flanks of the surrounding hills; such as Buckden Pike, Naughtberry, Wasset Fell, Stake Moss, Thoralby Common & Stake Fell. The only large tributary that joins Bishopdale Beck is the River Walden (or Walden Beck). Bishopdale Beck joins the River Ure at Froddle Dub, a mile east of Aysgarth Falls. It is approximately 9.3 miles (15 km) long from source to its confluence with the River Ure.

The Yorkshire Dales Rivers Trust YDRT has a remit to conserve the ecological condition of Bishopdale Beck from its headwaters to the Humber Estuary. The Ure Salmon Trust have undertaken remedial and fencing works alongside Bishopdale Beck to prevent cattle trespass. This is maintain the hatchling areas for spawning Salmon and so the trust have installed solar powered water troughs in the fields adjacent to the beck.
