= A684 road =

'A' road in Northern England

A684

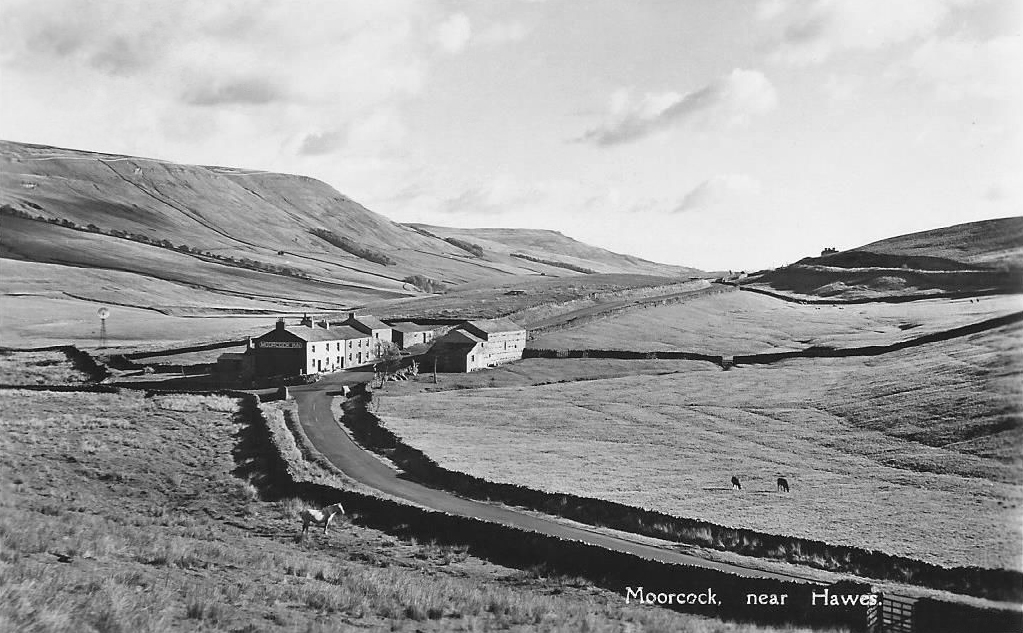
- A view looking east from Dandry Mire Viaduct at Garsdale Head c. 1900. Moorcock Inn is still trading as a pub and the view remains largely unchanged in this rural upland scene.

Route information
- Length: 70 mi (110 km)

Major junctions
- West end: Kendal; 54.3303°N 2.7413°W
- A6; M6 A683 A6108 A6055; A1(M) A167; A19
- East end: Ellerbeck (A19 road); 54.3685°N 1.3209°W

Location
- Country: United Kingdom
- Primary destinations: Bedale, Kendal, Hawes, Leyburn, Northallerton, Sedbergh

Road network
- Roads in the United Kingdom; Motorways; A and B road zones

The A684 is an A road that runs through Cumbria and North Yorkshire, starting at Kendal, Cumbria and ending at Ellerbeck and the A19 road in North Yorkshire. It crosses the full width of the Yorkshire Dales, passing through Garsdale and the full length of Wensleydale.

Flooding can be a problem after heavy rain, especially at Appersett, near Hawes, and heavy snow can close the road temporarily at the Black Horse hill and in Garsdale.

== Settlements on the road ==
- Kendal
- Sedbergh
- Garsdale
- Appersett
- Hawes
- Bainbridge
- Worton
- Aysgarth
- West Witton
- Wensley
- Leyburn
- Constable Burton
- Patrick Brompton
- Crakehall
- Morton-on-Swale
- Ainderby Steeple
- Northallerton
- Ellerbeck where it meets the A19 road.

== The route ==
The A684 has primary status for the short length between Kendal and junction 37 of the M6 motorway, though even this primary section involves two hills and some tricky twists. East of the M6, the road descends the "Black Horse" hill and passes through Sedbergh where there is a short diversion to avoid the main street and a difficult right-angled bend. Another right-angled bend 6 miles (9.7 km) east at Garsdale Hall, and the road goes further up the valley to the watershed at Garsdale Head. After this the road passes under Garsdale (or Dandry Mire, or Moorcock) viaduct where after there is a junction with the B6259 road to Kirkby Stephen. The road drops down through upper Wensleydale into Appersett, a junction with the B6255 and into the town of Hawes

There is a 17-ton MGW (maximum gross weight) restriction over the bridge spanning the Widdale Beck in Appersett. Because of this, heavy eastbound traffic must leave just before the bridge and proceed onto an unclassified road through Hardraw and then turn south onto Burnt Acres Lane bringing the vehicles back to the A684 just east of Hawes town centre. Heavy westbound traffic from the B6255 is expected to go through Hawes eastwards and then back through Hardraw to avoid the weight restriction.

In Hawes, after the junction with B6255 road to Ingleton, the road splits into single lanes with the eastbound fork dropping down to the junction with Burnt Acres Lane and the westbound taking a cobbled road through the town. The two forks meet up at the Market Square in Hawes.

There is a triangular road junction in Bainbridge with the road to Askrigg before the road goes east again over the River Bain. After passing Askrigg and bridging the confluence of the Bishopdale and Walden Becks, the road meets the B6160 from Addingham where there is a grade II listed AA phone box.

It then passes through West Witton, Wensley, Leyburn (where it runs in tandem with the A6108 for a short distance), Constable Burton, Patrick Brompton and Crakehall before arriving at Bedale. The road used to continue through Bedale Town and on through Aiskew and then after another ungated crossing of the Wensleydale Railway, it had a junction with a slip road to the A6055 (the old A1 Junction going North). Now, Bedale is bypassed (see below) and the road intersects with the A6055 and the A1(M) just north of Leeming Bar and rejoins the old route just east of Leeming Bar.

The road then heads out through Morton-On-Swale, Ainderby Steeple and into Northallerton via Romanby where it crosses the River Wiske on a bridge built in 1957, avoiding the grade II listed Howden Bridge. At Northallerton, it first meets the A167 and runs in tandem as the A167 through Northallerton. The road crosses two adjacent railways in the town; the first is a gated crossing on the freight lines to and from Teesside, and the second is under the railway station at Northallerton on the East Coast Main Line. The road carries on eastwards meeting the A168 and loops east then northwards around the town centre before it leaves the A167/A168 and heads north out of the town.

The road then heads mainly eastwards avoiding Brompton but going through Ellerbeck before arriving at a large junction with the A19 that allows access north and south and also onto an unclassified road into Osmotherley.

== Bedale Bypass ==
On 16 July 2014 the Department of Transport announced the go-ahead for the villages of Leeming Bar and Aiskew and the town of Bedale in North Yorkshire to be bypassed. The bypass, which opened to traffic on 11 August 2016, leaves the old A684 just north of St Gregory's Church in Bedale and runs eastwards for 3 miles (4.8 km) to a point about 0.6 miles (1 km) east of Leeming Bar. It connects with junction 51 on the A1M and the A6055 just north of Leeming Bar. Archaeological excavations in advance of the road construction discovered an Iron Age settlement and the Aiskew Roman villa.

== Safety ==
In 2014, EuroRAP published a brochure based on data collected between 2010 and 2012. It listed the A684 as being a High Risk road along its entire length from the M6 to the A19.
