= List of Yorkshire Dales =

This is a list of dales in the Yorkshire Dales, arranged geographically from south to north. Side dales are indented under the dale from which they branch. An alphabetical list follows at the end.

The Yorkshire Dales are dales in the Pennine area of the historic county of Yorkshire in northern England. They do not include dales south of Airedale or dales in other areas of Yorkshire, for example in the North York Moors. They are now mainly in the county of North Yorkshire, but some are now in Cumbria or County Durham. Most of the dales are in the Yorkshire Dales National Park. Nidderdale, Washburndale and Colsterdale are in the Nidderdale National Landscape. Teesdale and its side dales, historically in the North Riding of Yorkshire, and sometimes considered part of the Yorkshire Dales, are in the North Pennines National Landscape.

On 1 August 2016, the area of the National Park was increased by nearly a quarter, with an extra 161 square miles (417 square kilometres) of upland landscape given protected status.

Dales draining to the North Sea

- Airedale
  - Goredale
  - Malhamdale, the upper valley of the River Aire
- Wharfedale
  - Washburn Valley also known as Washburndale
  - Mossdale
  - Littondale
  - Langstrothdale, the valley of the River Wharfe above Hubberholme
- Nidderdale
- Wensleydale
  - Colsterdale
  - Coverdale
  - Apedale
  - Waldendale
  - Bishopdale
  - Raydale
    - Cragdale
    - Bardale
  - Sleddale
  - Fossdale
  - Widdale
  - Cotterdale
- Swaledale
  - Arkengarthdale
  - Birkdale
    - Uldale
    - Little Sled Dale
    - Great Sled Dale
  - East Stonesdale
  - Moresdale
  - Skegdale
  - West Stonesdale
  - Whitsundale (or Whitsun Dale)
- Teesdale, historically shared by Yorkshire and County Durham
  - Deepdale (or Deep Dale)
  - Baldersdale
  - Lunedale

Dales draining to the Irish Sea

- Ribblesdale, the valley of the River Ribble above Hellifield
  - Clapdale
  - Silverdale, between Pen-y-Ghent and Fountains Fell
  - Stockdale
- Crummackdale, the valley of Austwick Beck above Austwick
- Lonsdale, the valley of the River Greta
  - Kingsdale
  - Doedale/Twisleton Dale or Chapel-le-Dale, the valley of the River Doe
- Barbondale
- Dentdale
  - Deepdale
- Garsdale
  - Grisedale
- (Mallerstang)
- Ravenstonedale

== Alphabetical list ==
- Airedale
- Apedale
- Arkengarthdale
- Baldersdale
- Barbondale
- Bardale
- Birkdale
- Bishopdale
- Chapel-le-Dale (Wisedale)
- Clapdale
- Coalsgarthdale
- Colsterdale
- Cotterdale
- Coverdale
- Cragdale
- Crummackdale
- Deepdale (off Dentdale)
- Deepdale (off Teesdale, now in Durham)
- Dentdale
- Dibbdale
- Doedale/Twistletondale
- East Stonesdale
- Fossdale
- Garsdale
- Goredale
- Great Sled Dale
- Grisedale
- Langstrothdale
- Little Dale
- Little Sled Dale
- Littondale
- Lonsdale
- Lunedale
- Kingsdale
- Malhamdale
- (Mallerstang)
- Moresdale
- Mossdale
- Nidderdale
- Ravenstonedale
- Raydale
- Ribblesdale
- Silverdale
- Skegdale
- Sleddale
- Smardale
- Stockdale
- Swaledale
- Uldale (NW of Grisedale)
- Uldale (N of Little Sled Dale)
- Waldendale
- Washburndale
- Wensleydale
- West Stonesdale
- Whitsundale
- Widdale
- Wharfedale
