= Dodd Fell Hill =

Hill in the Yorkshire Dales, England

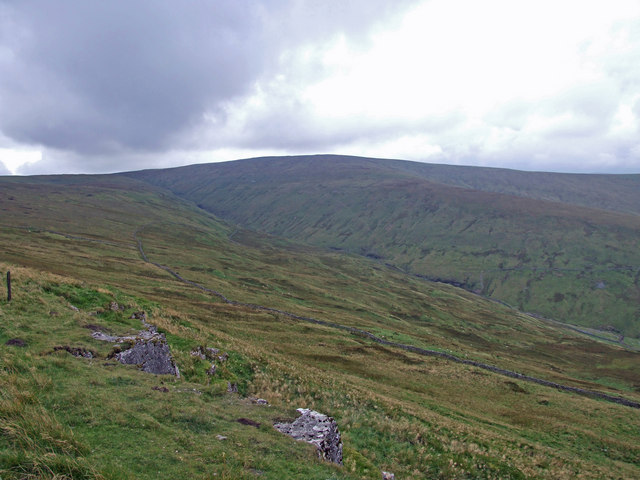
- Dodd Fell Hill

Highest point
- Elevation: 668 m (2,192 ft)
- Prominence: 230
- Parent peak: Great Knoutberry Hill
- Listing: Marilyn
- Coordinates: 54°15′23″N 2°14′47″W

Geography
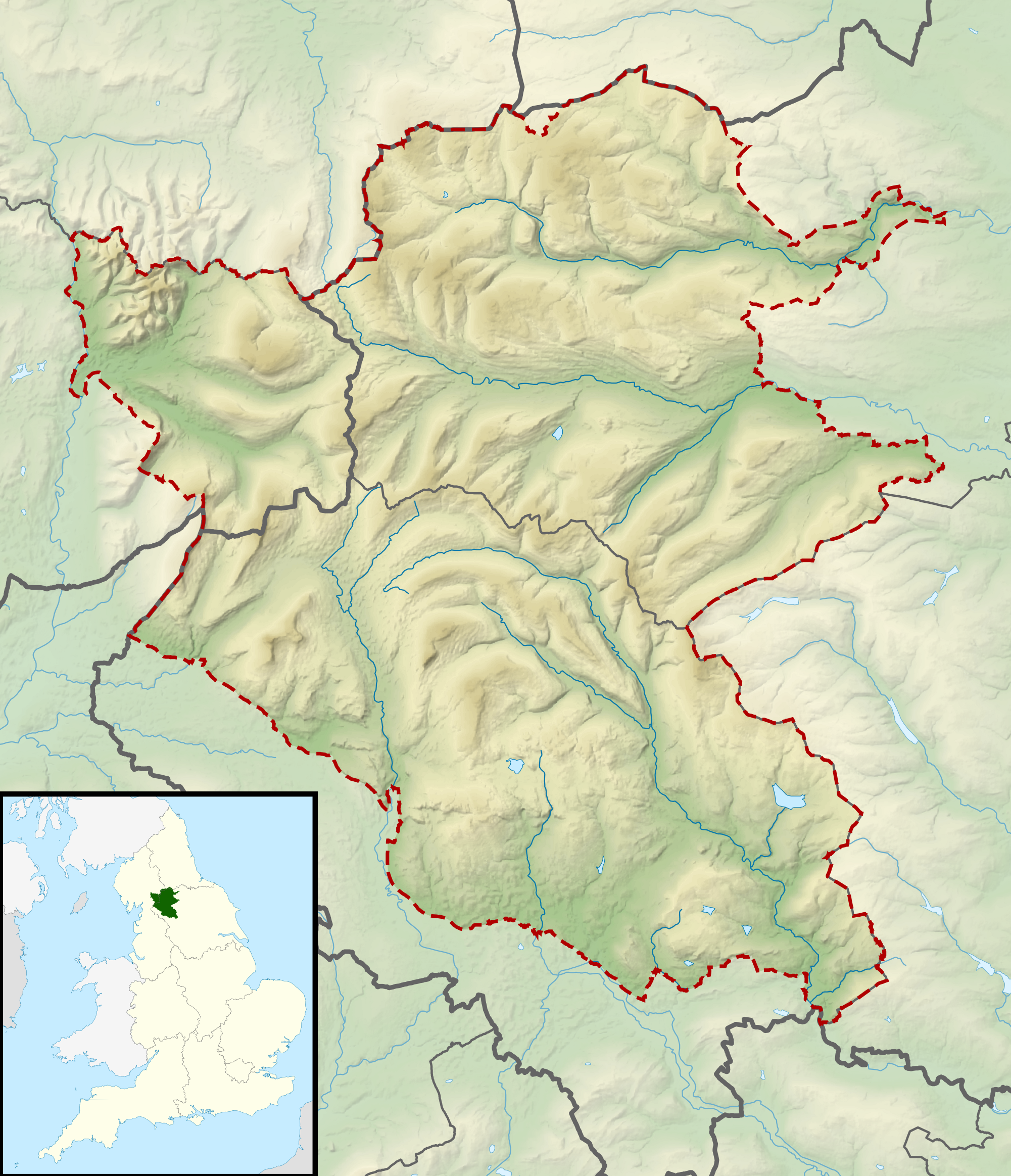
- Location within Yorkshire Dales
- Location: North Yorkshire, England
- OS grid: SD840845

Dodd Fell Hill is a hill in the Yorkshire Dales, in North Yorkshire, England. It is classed as a Marilyn (a hill with topographic prominence of at least 150 metres (490 ft)) and its summit is at 668 metres (2,192 ft). The flat summit, known as Dodd Fell Hill, is marked by a concrete trig-point. The hill has a lower summit known as Ten End, which is 1.6-kilometre (1 mi) to the north, and slightly lower at 580 metres (1,910 ft) above sea level.

The name of Dodd Fell is derived from the Middle English Dodde, and the Old Norse Fjall, meaning the hill with the rounded top.

Water flowing off the hill to the north-east forms Duerley Beck, and runs down Sleddale and becomes a tributary of the River Ure. Water flowing to the north runs through Snaizeholme, a side dale of Widdale, and the high ridge between the summit of Dodd Fell and Snaizeholme is traversed by the Pennine Way.

Rainfall on Dodd Fell at Top Duerley, SD860846, 578 metres (1,896 ft) elevation
Year	Rainfall	Notes	Ref
1968	1,847 millimetres (72.7 in)	Location is on the high ground between Dodd Fell and Wether Fell	
1969	1,858 millimetres (73.1 in)		
1970	1,854 millimetres (73.0 in)		
