= Sleddale =

Valley in the Yorkshire Dales, England

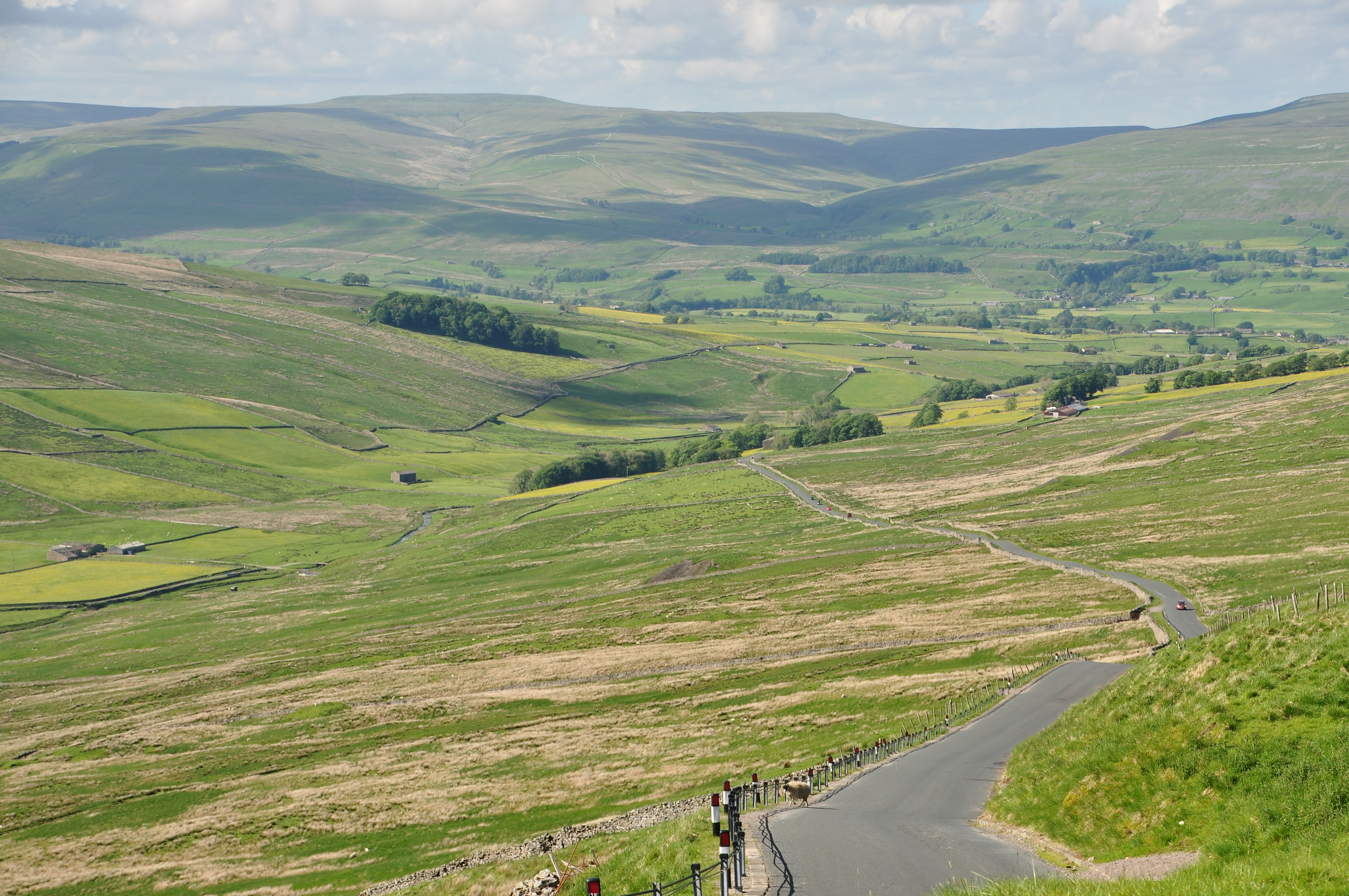
- Sleddale looking northwards

- Location within North Yorkshire
- Length: 3 miles (4.8 km); South west–north east

Geology
- Type: Glacial

Geography
- Location: Wensleydale, North Yorkshire
- Country: England
- Coordinates: 54.27°N 2.21°W
- River: Duerley Beck (Gayle Beck)
- Interactive map of Sleddale

Sleddale is a short, narrow valley to the south of Wensleydale in North Yorkshire, England. The waters draining down the valley feed into the River Ure and form part of the Humber Catchment. The valley has only one settlement, Gayle, although Hawes lies at the mouth of the beck where it runs into the River Ure. The dale is characterised by upland farming and historical mine workings, and is between the slopes of Dodd Fell to the west, and Wether Fell to the east.

== History ==
The name Sleddale first appears in documents in 1280 as Seldalegile. The name is a combination of the Old English words of slæd and dæl, meaning slow-dale. The name of the beck which flows down the valley (Duerley Beck), has not influenced the name of the dale (or vice versa), which does occur in the Yorkshire Dales, but is uncommon. Occasionally, the name for the water down the valley was referred to as Sleddale Beck. According to the Yorkshire Dales National Park Authority, the dale extends from Tongue Wood in the south, to just above (south of) the hamlet of Gayle, and is a classic U-shaped glacial valley, that feeds into Mid-Wensleydale.

Historically, the dale was in the Ancient Parish of Askrigg, but is now part of the civil parish of Hawes. The dale was traditionally a farming valley with a history of hay-making, and circular buildings set aside for silage evident in the dale. However, even this was not easy as the land is not as cultivable as nearby pastures, and as such, the dale is largely undeveloped. Besides upland farming, one of the old industries in the valley was the picking of cloudberries. They grew with such abundance on the upper slopes of the valley that the berries were regularly sold at markets in Hawes and Settle. The dale was enclosed in 1816, along with most other areas around Hawes and Bainbridge.

The road through Sleddale from Gayle, goes up over the moors past Fleet Moss and into Langstrothdale. Between Gayle and Fleet Moss, the road is known as Beggarman's Road, and follows the contours of the eastern side of the valley. The road is Yorkshire's highest road capable of accepting normal motorised vehicular traffic, and the climb from Gayle is 1,000 feet (300 m) in only 3 miles (4.8 km). It is also noted as being a tough bicycle ride for cyclists going up the valley.

The Pennine Way skirts to the west of the summit of Dodd Fell and traverses the high ground separating Widdale from Sleddale. The walk then enters Sleddale in its lower reaches, going through Gayle and then Hawes. Sleddale is "hemmed in by the lofty hills of Dodd Fell, and Drumaldrace (Wether Fell)."

== Geology ==
The underlying rock in the valley is from the Yoredale Series and mainly consists of limestone, shale and sandstone. Just below the Middle Limestone formation lies a narrow coal seam which was exploited in Sleddale (and nearby Cotterdale too). The thin layer of coal is attributed to small swamps which developed here rather than the extensive bogs that led to deeper and better coalfields elsewhere in Yorkshire and the North of England. Four mines are known to have existed in the upper dale; West Duerley, Storth, Scar Head and Bank Gill Colliery. The collieries in the dale worked a very poor seam of coal, but in the absence of good transportation, they survived largely until the Wensleydale Railway was opened, and better quality coal could be railed into Wensleydale. The spoil heaps from these workings, which consist largely of shale and iron nodules, still scar the upper valley landscape.

The dale was also used to produce peat for people in Appersett, Gayle, Hawes and Snaizeholme, who held turbary rights at Ten End peat ground (SD844868). Along with the adjacent south to north valleys of Mid-Wensleydale (Snaizeholme, Widdale and Raydale), Sleddale lacks the mineral deposits on the northern side of the main valley (lead, barytes etc).

Duerley Beck cuts through the dale, and enters the River Ure just past the town of Gayle at the bottom of the valley, though Hawes is where the beck enter the Ure. The beck runs for 5.23 miles (8.42 km) and drains an rea of 5.66 square miles (14.65 km^{2}). The beck drains the land between Dodd Fell in the west, and Wether Fell in the east. At the lower end of the valley, the beck is shown on OS Mapping as Gayle Beck, and before it reaches the hamlet of Gayle at the southern end of the valley, it drops 40 feet (12 m) over Aysgill Force. White-clawed crayfish (austropotamobius pallipes) have been observed in Duerley beck in the 1980s and 1990s.

The beck is hard to see in the landscape at the northern end as it is low on the valley floor, and fringed with trees. The cascade of water through the rocks at Gayle is partially artificial; the rock within the beck was cut out during road-building efforts in the 18th century.

Rainfall in Sleddale 1961 – 1975
Year	Rainfall	Location	Gridref	Altitude	Notes	Ref
1961	1,326 millimetres (52.22 in)	Hawes	SD874502	230 metres (750 ft)		
1968	1,847 millimetres (72.7 in)	Top Duerley	SD860846	578 metres (1,896 ft)	Location is on the high ground between Dodd Fell and Wether Fell	
1969	1,858 millimetres (73.1 in)	Top Duerley	SD860846	578 metres (1,896 ft)		
1970	1,854 millimetres (73.0 in)	Top Duerley	SD860846	578 metres (1,896 ft)		
1975	1,059 millimetres (41.7 in)	Hawes sewage works	SD874502	230 metres (750 ft)	Location is at the very end of the dale, where Gayle Beck meets the River Ure	
