= Appersett Viaduct =

Railway viaduct in North Yorkshire, England

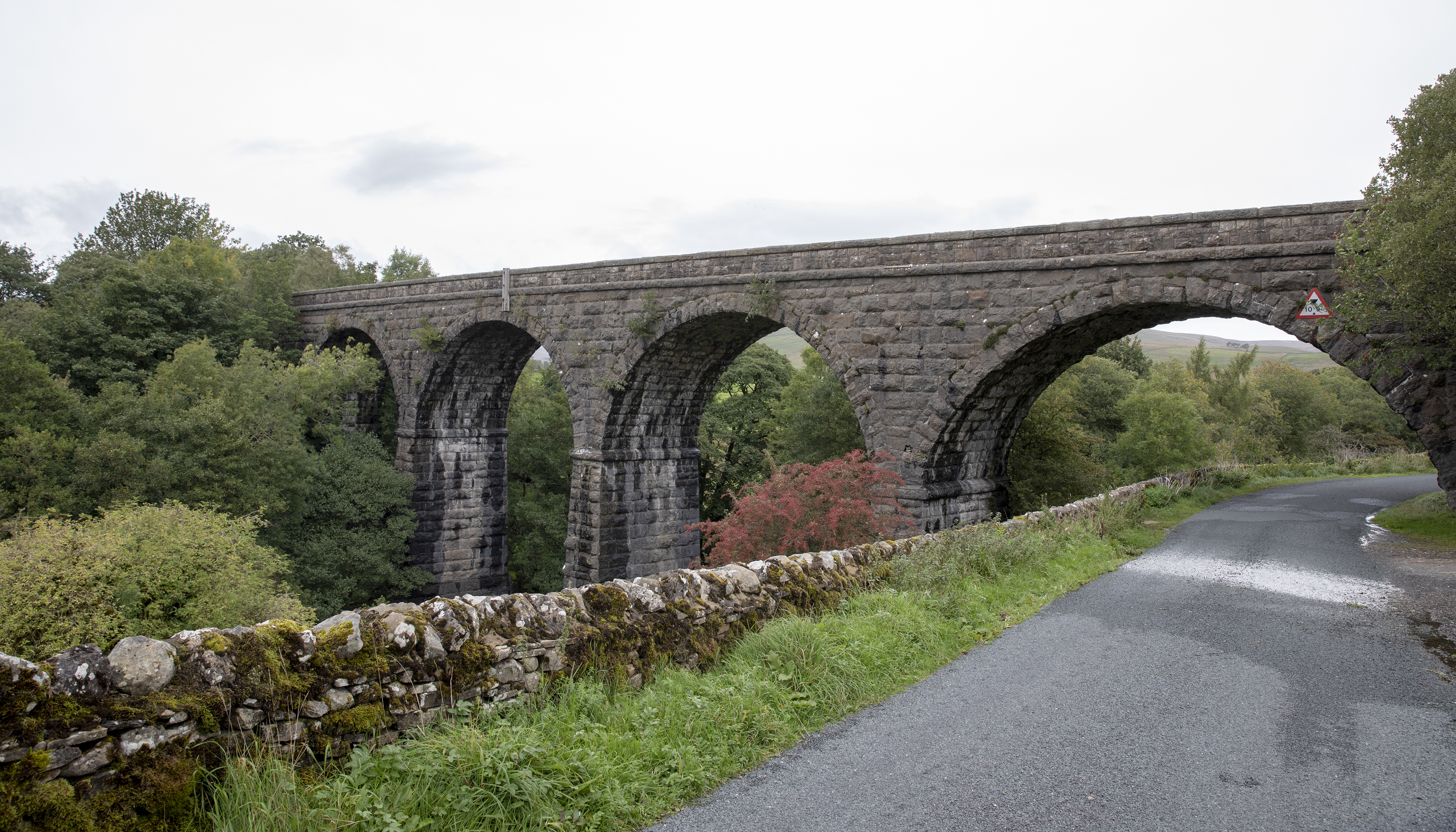
- Appersett Viaduct
- Coordinates: 54.3088°N 2.2223°W
- OS grid reference: SD856904
- Carries: Wensleydale Line
- Crosses: Widdale Beck
- Locale: Appersett, North Yorkshire, England
- Other name: Appersett Gill Viaduct

Characteristics
- Total length: 108 yards (99 m)
- Height: 80 feet (24 m)
- No. of spans: 4

History
- Construction start: November 1873
- Construction end: June 1878
- Opened: August 1878

Location
- Interactive map of Appersett Viaduct

Appersett Viaduct is a disused railway bridge in Wensleydale, North Yorkshire, England. It was opened by the Midland Railway in 1878 as part of their Hawes branch line, later becoming part of the Wensleydale line between Garsdale and Northallerton. The viaduct straddles Widdale Beck, a tributary of the River Ure. The section of line between Hawes and Garsdale was the most heavily engineered of the whole Wensleydale Line, with Appersett Viaduct being viewed as the most dramatic structure along the line. Passenger services along this section of the line ceased in 1959.

== History ==
Appersett Viaduct was built to carry the Hawes branch line over Widdale Beck (a tributary of the River Ure) and an unclassified road, near to the hamlet of Appersett. The viaduct was designed by J. S. Crossley, and curves slightly northwards with a 1-in-72 gradient (westwards) as it crosses the small valley carrying Widdale Beck. The viaduct has five arches, each being between 42–45 feet (13–14 m) across, with four piers, and the viaduct is built with ashlar stone with a band of stone jutting out below the coped parapet. Work on the viaduct started on 28 November 1873, with completion in June 1878, and it was opened to traffic to and from Hawes Junction (now Garsdale) in August 1878. The viaduct is 108 yards (99 m) long, 56 feet (17 m) from water level to the bottom of the arches, and the rails are set at 60 feet (18 m) high. (Note: Jenkins states that the viaduct is 375 feet (114 m), 50 feet (15 m) more than the stipulated length in most sources.) The viaduct was last used by trains in March 1959.

Appersett viaduct was listed as being 261 miles 30 chains (420.6 km) from London St Pancras (measured via Cudworth and Keighley), which made it 4 miles 63 chains (7.7 km) east of Garsdale, and 1-mile-19-chain (2 km) west of Hawes. The Wensleydale line between Hawes and Northallerton was not as heavily engineered as the Hawes branch, which has two viaducts and one tunnel; the viaduct at Appersett is often labelled as the "finest structure" on the old line. The branch was built as part of Contract No.5 from Hawes Junction station to Hawes itself, and the line opened three years after the main line between Settle and Carlisle. The engineers for the line were Crossley and Story, but records also indicate Benton and Woodiwiss, who undertook many of the works on the Settle–Carlisle line, were actually the resident engineers.

Whilst the viaduct does not carry a right of way, it can be viewed easily from the road and nearby paths, and it has been used as an abseiling structure. Although plans have been forwarded many times to reinstate the railway (either as the full Wensleydale line, or simply a 6-mile (9.7 km) branch between Hawes and Garsdale, the rejection of funding during the restore your railways applications prompted the Yorkshire Dales National Park Authority to remove its protection for the trackbed along the viaduct.

The viaduct is listed as HGE/37 under the list that shows the BRB (Residuary) Ltd.'s (BRBR) railway structures, and it was grade II listed in 1969. Another alternative name for the structure is Appersett Gill Viaduct, which appeared in early newspaper reports about the line, but still occasionally is referred to. Appersett Gill is known more commonly as Widdale Beck, which enters the River Ure just after flowing through the hamlet of Appersett.

== See also ==
- Mossdale Viaduct
