= Richmond to Lancaster Turnpike =

Former road in Northern England

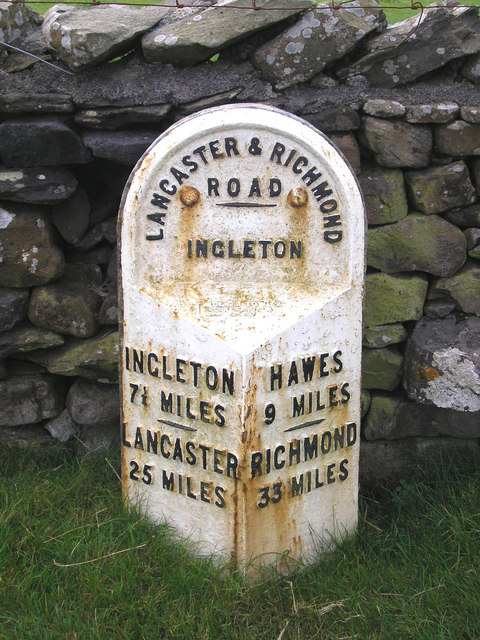
- Milestone on the B6255

Route information
- Length: 58 mi (93 km)
- Existed: 1751–1878

Major junctions
- East end: Richmond54.403°N 1.737°W
- West end: Lancashire54.047°N 2.801°W

Location
- Country: United Kingdom

Road network
- Roads in the United Kingdom; Motorways; A and B road zones

The Richmond to Lancaster Turnpike, was a road that was opened in the second half of the 18th century between Richmond, in the North Riding of Yorkshire and Lancaster in Lancashire, Northern England. The turnpike was built to allow goods to be taken from Yorkshire (and later County Durham) to the port of Lancaster. It was approved in 1751, but was not wholly completed until 1774.

Initially, the turnpike used existing or Roman roads that were resurfaced and widened to enable them to take horse-drawn coaches. The road crossed over from Wensleydale into Ribblesdale via Cam High Road from Bainbridge, using a Roman Road built to connect two Roman forts. In the 1790s the route was diverted away from Cam High Road through Hawes, and this accelerated the decline of Askrigg as a market town, with Hawes taking its place.

Most of the road is still in use as modern roads.

== History ==
=== Origins and building ===
Richmond and Lancaster Road Act 1750
- Act of Parliament
- Parliament of Great Britain
- Long title: An Act for repairing the Road leading from the East End of Brumpton High Lane, in the County of York, to the Town of Richmond, and from thence, to and through the Towns of Askrigg and Ingleton, in the said County, to the Town of Lancaster, in the County of Lancaster.
- Citation: 24 Geo. 2. c. 17
- Territorial extent: Great Britain

Dates
- Royal assent: 22 May 1751
- Commencement: 17 January 1751 (Note: Start of session.)
- Repealed: 1 June 1817
Other legislation
Repealed by	Richmond (Yorkshire), Lancaster, Lucy Cross and Gatherley Moor Roads Act 1817

Status: Repealed

Text of statute as originally enacted

In the 18th century, Richmond was the seat of a court of quarter sessions, it was a chief market in the area for goods and it was also the export point for metals and ores mined and quarried in Swaledale and Wensleydale. In addition to this, the Court of Archdeaconry extended quite far westwards beyond the Lancashire border, but all the major roads in the area bypassed Richmond to either the north or the east. At the same time, Lancaster was developing into a prosperous port with good links into Ireland, the Americas and the Baltic countries. The people in Wensleydale had also petitioned the local landowners to do something about the roads. One petitioner stated that the roads through Wensleydale were "so bad, ruinous, narrow and rocky that it is totally impassible at some Times of the Year for any kind of Wheel Carriages[sic] ...". Parliament approved the turnpike in 1751, by the Richmond and Lancaster Road Act 1750 (24 Geo. 2. c. 17), and in June of the same year, the turnpike trust employed Alexander Fothergill as its surveyor with a salary of £30 per year. Fothergill became the surveyor for the eastern district (from Ingleton to Richmond).

In 1755, the road was extended northwards from Richmond through to Piercebridge via Gilling West. This allowed for the important transport of Durham coal, although initially, coal was exempt from being charged for. Fothergill was not able to ride the entire course of the road until 1774, when the trustees of the turnpike were dissatisfied with his work and accused him of dishonesty in his financial affairs. As a result of this accusation, he was dismissed from his post of surveyor.

Much of the route had already existed in one form or another, it was down to the Turnpike Trust to remediate all the surfaces and then charge tolls which they set about doing as soon as the bill was passed in May 1751. Fothergill reported in 1755 that the road was "60 miles (97 km) in length; (Note: The road was listed on Green Bridge in Richmond as being 56 miles (90 km) in length, which is the generally accepted measure. This was before the diversion through Hawes in 1795. Metal milestones erected in the 19th century were imprinted with the road as being 58 miles (93 km). However, the road actually started in Brompton-on-Swale, some 3 miles (4.8 km) to the east of Richmond, which would bring the distance to 59 miles (95 km), but most measurements were taken from Green Bridge, so 56 or 58 miles became the norm. Another source from 1832, states that the length of the road was 58.75 miles (94.55 km) between Lancaster and Richmond. The western district was a total mileage of 18.25 miles (29.37 km) and the eastern district (from Ingleton to Richmond) being 40.5 miles (65.2 km).) 40 miles (64 km) of which have been repaired and made good". Labour for the road came from surveyors junior to Fothergill, but also crucially, most of the manual labour was undertaken by the local population through whose parish the road went. The Highways Act 1555 stated that each parish or township was responsible for the upkeep of the roads. Every inhabitant had to commit to four days annually working on the road. In 1563, this was amended to six days each. Fothergill was reliant on his local surveyors to organise this "statute labour" which predicated that the local surveyor kept an accurate list of who was living in the parish at that time.

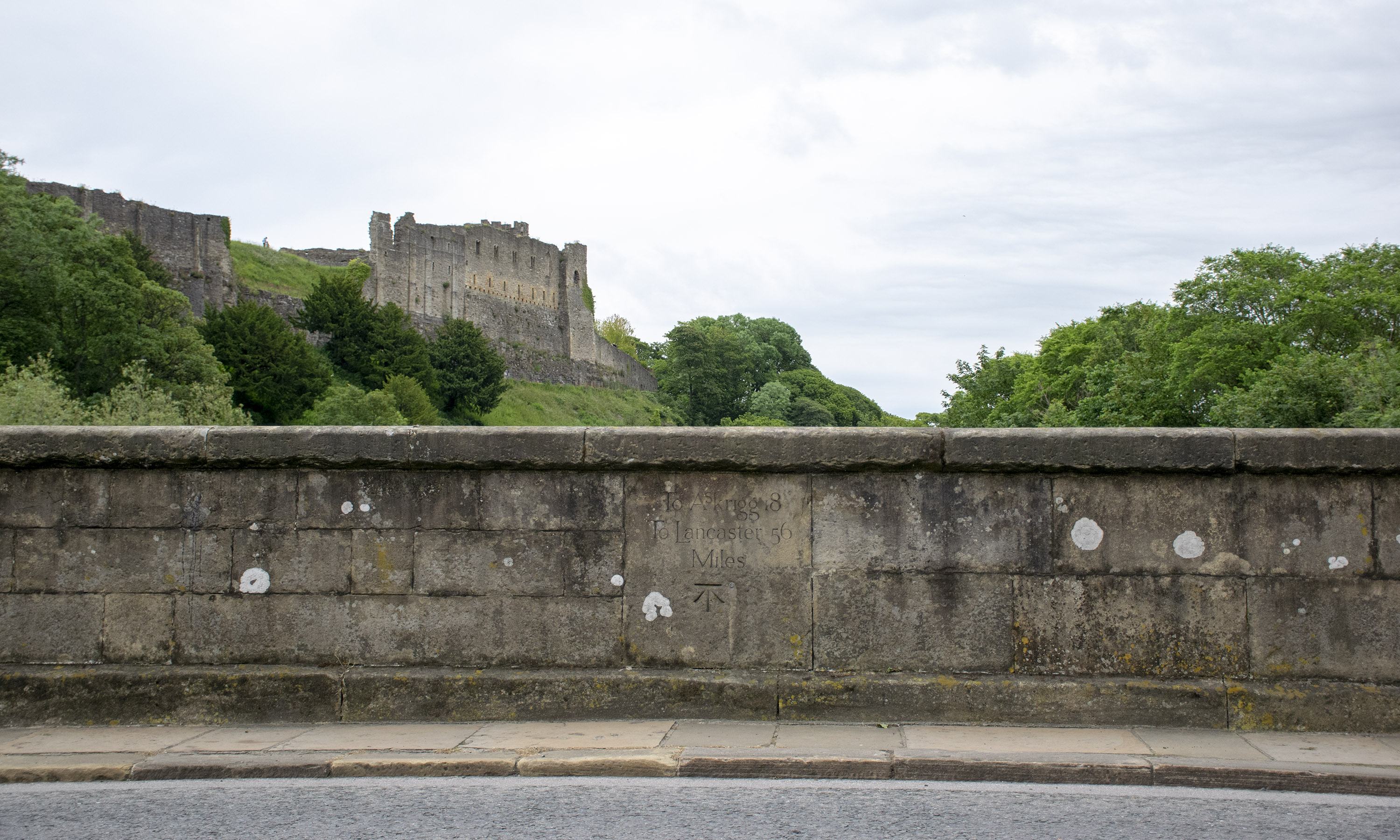
Green Bridge at Richmond, which straddles the River Swale. Note the milestone set into the wall and the number of stones on the north side (left, is three, while south is only two)

At Bow Bridge between Askrigg and Bainbridge, the existing 13th century bridge over Grange Beck was widened to accommodate the new road. The bridge is now a scheduled monument, and was replaced in 1899 with a new bridge 98 feet (30 m) to the south. A bridge was constructed at Richmond which spanned the River Swale. Over this, the turnpike went in a rough south westerly direction encountering its first tollbar at Slee Hill where the edge of Richmond was. The bridge at Richmond, always known as Green Bridge as it connected Richmond Green with the south side of the Swale, which until that point, had not existed as a crossing and in fact was the only crossing of the Swale in Richmond until the bridge connecting to the railway station was opened in 1876. Flooding had damaged the original bridge so much by the mid 1780s that it had to be replaced. The design of the bridge was down to John Carr of York, but as the River Swale was the dividing line between the Borough of Richmond and the North Riding of Yorkshire, each employed their own contractor to finish their half of the bridge and meet in the middle. This can be seen in the slight differences of construction; at the county end (the southern half) the masonry is composed of two layers of stone. On the borough half (the northern end) the depth of the stone runs to three layers.

When the river level is low, the bases of the previous bridge can be seen in the water immediately upstream of the present bridge.

=== Tolls and earnings ===
The day-to-day running of the turnpike became the responsibility of the Richmond and Lancaster Turnpike Trust. Between 1758 and 1799, the trust charged a flat rate of 10d for transit throughout the town of Richmond and the borough of Richmondshire. Prices for transit along the route to Lancaster were initially quite high (typically 4 Shillings and 6 pence [4s, 6d]), which was later relaxed when in 1756, an Act of Parliament allowed the turnpike trusts to charge for the carriage of coal. Fothergill noted that the volume of coal traffic using the route from Durham was stopping the route from being rebuilt when it fell into disrepair. Thereafter, charges amounted to 10d for twenty cattle, 5d for twenty sheep, 1d for a laden horse and 6d for three or four horse carriages.

In the period from 1825 to 1829, the trust typically paid an interest rate to its shareholders of 5% per year. Besides the droving of animals, which had been going on via the Cam High Road for centuries anyway, goods taken to Richmond were groceries, drink, mahogany and other timber, with corn and butter going westwards from Swaledale and Wensleydale. In 1835, the total receipts from the tollhouses in the eastern district was £271, 7 shillings and sixpence. £116 was spent on wages for labour, tradesmen, the treasurer (£10) and the clerk (£5). However, the trust was in debt to the tune of over £4,100. Conversely, the western district had toll receipts of over £515 and paid their treasurer and clerk twice as much as the eastern district. Their debts were slightly higher at £5,200.

In early 1796, the combination of suspected Jacobite uprisings, the Corn Laws and the high price of food, resulted in rioting breaking out through Wensleydale. At least 300 people were rioting within 1 mile (1.6 km) of Bolton Castle, which made the authorities dispatch a "troop of Horse" to deal with the issue. However, the rioters agreed not to interrupt the delivery of grain on the turnpike through the dale.

=== Trust closure ===
A report prepared for Parliament in 1851 stated that the trustees had left the maintenance on the road to individual parishes over the last 30 years. Some of the milestones on the road had been replaced with metal ones that stated the parish name and displayed the name of the "Lancaster and Richmond Road". The eastern end of the turnpike; that which ran through Ribblesdale, Wensleydale and Swaledale, was operated by the trust until 1868, when it was closed by an Act of Parliament. Responsibility for the turnpikes thereafter was down to the district highway boards. The Highways and Locomotives Act 1878 abolished the turnpike trusts completely.

== Route ==
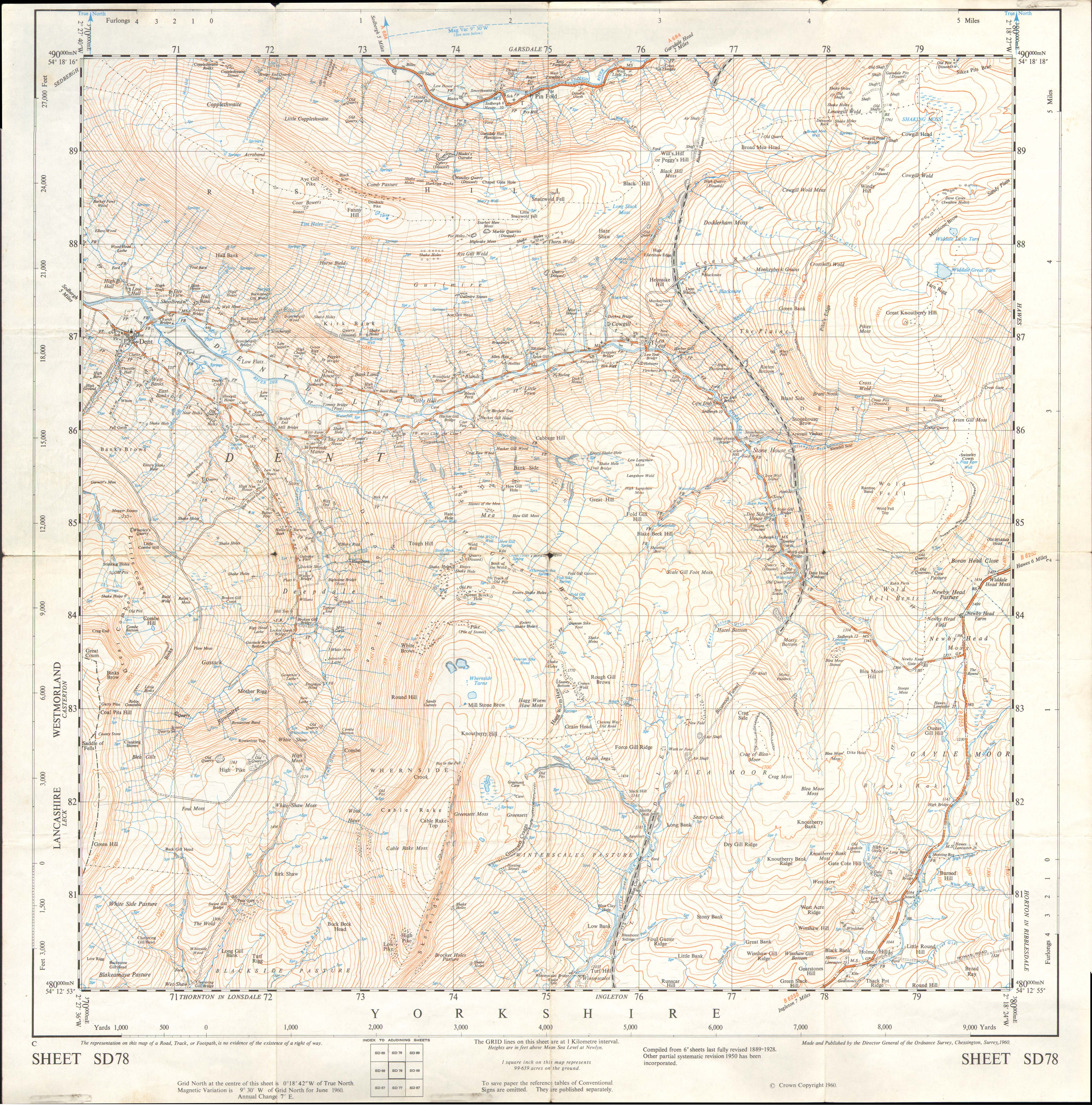
An Ordnance Survey Sheet from 1960 showing the B6255 at Newby Head (lower right). The Cam High Road joins the B6255 at Gearstones at gridref SE785803

Crossing the Yorkshire/Lancashire border east of Cantsfield

Even though it was called the Richmond to Lancaster Turnpike, the road started at Brompton-on-Swale (with a tollhouse), some 3 miles (5 km) to the east of Richmond on what is now the A6055 road. This was the original course of the Great North Road (Dere Street) before the various bypasses were built, which allowed traffic to access Richmond from the Great North Road. The road then took the same course as the present B6271 along the north bank of the River Swale into Richmond, which at its western end is called Maison Dieu. (Note: The road was named after the nearby hospital Maison Dieu (God's House) which had its foundations between the road and Frenchgate.) The road then curved down Frenchgate into the Market Place in Richmond. Frenchgate, originally Franchegate, was the only approach into town from the north and east, but by 1802, was completely unsuitable for wheeled traffic, so another road was cut that ran parallel to Frenchgate and approached the Market Place via what is now King Street. The road at the opposite end of the market place, New Road was cut in the 1750s to allow the passage of traffic onto Bridge Street and ultimately, across Green Bridge.

The route went in a south westerly direction over the moor avoiding Leyburn and going just past Bellerby and on to Carperby and eventually, Askrigg. In 1774, Fothergill and his local assistant had the road widened here, when it was found to be less than the stipulated 7 yards (6.4 m) in width. The road then went due south across the River Ure into Bainbridge via the grade II listed Yore Bridge. (Note: Not to be confused with the grade II listed Yore Bridge at Aysgarth, also straddling the River Ure and also designed by John Carr.) This, like Green Bridge in Richmond, was designed by the York architect, John Carr.

From Bainbridge, the turnpike used a Roman Road known as Cam High Road across the moors over Wether Fell to Ribblesdale. Cam High Road was built by Agricola in the 1st century to link the fort at Bainbridge (Virosidum) with the Roman Garrisons at Lancaster and Ribchester, and over Cam Fell, it was 6 yards (5.5 m) wide. It was used by Medieval wool traders until its re-use for the turnpike. By the 1750s, only the section from Bainbridge to Ingleton still survived from the original Roman Road, and it is believed it went further south west towards Low Bentham. In 1795, the section of Cam High Road was abandoned as part of the turnpike and an alternative route was driven over the moors from the then hamlet of Hawes through Widdale to meet the turnpike at a place called Gearstones. This was a gentler route, although uphill to Newby Head from both directions, the ascent was 500 feet (150 m) lower than that of Cam Fell and Wether Fell at 1,986 feet (605 m). This diversion accelerated the demise of Askrigg as a market town and meant a prosperous growth in Hawes which also became the place of coaching inns and hostelries. Newby Head used to have a drovers' inn located there (now a farmhouse) and when the turnpike traffic was diverted this way, it took on a more demanding role, with the inn at Gearstones, becoming less utilised.

From Gearstones, the route uses the B6255 (the entire route from Hawes to Ingleton is now this road) and the turnpike passed under the Settle-Carlisle railway between Ribblehead station and Ribblehead Viaduct, before crossing into Doedale to go into Ingleton. At Chapel-le-Dale, the old Roman Road crosses to the north bank of the River Doe, and follows the river and the B6255 south westwards into Ingleton. The original Roman Road went due south to Bentham and beyond, but the turnpike headed westwards towards Wray and Farleton, where there was a tollhouse where the route joins the now A683 road.

The road then continued on pre-existing trackways through Caton, Quernmore and Brookhouse, all on the south side of the River Lune, until it reached Lancaster.

== Settlements ==
(from east to west original 1751 road)

- Brompton-on-Swale♦ (a junction with the Great North Road)
- Richmond♦
- Redmire♦ (east of the village)
- Carperby♦ (at Ballowfield)
- Nappa
- Askrigg♦
- Bainbridge♦
- Hawes♦
- Gearstones
- Ribblehead
- Chapel-le-Dale
- Ingleton♦
- Hornby
- Farleton♦
- Claughton
- Cayton (Caton)
- Quernmore
- Brookhouse
- Lancaster

(1755 extension)

- Piercebridge
- Aldbrough St John
- Melsonby
- Gilling West
- ♦ The location was known to have possessed a tollbar or toll collection point.

== Connections ==
At the eastern end in Brompton-on-Swale, the road connected into the Great North Road and was furnished with a tollhouse for this purpose. Another turnpike connected with Leyburn through Bellerby. This is now part of the route of the A6108 road.

The Richmond to Lancaster Turnpike connected with the Askrigg to Sedbergh Turnpike at Askrigg. This road, which was opened in 1761, extended westwards along the north bank of the River Ure and is now the A684 from where it crosses the river at Appersett and leaves North Yorkshire at a point close to the Moorcock Inn. At Hawes, the 1829 turnpikes to the hamlet of Gayle and to Kirkby Stephen opened. In 1836, barring short extensions, the last major turnpike to be built in the Yorkshire Dales was constructed between Richmond and Reeth.

At Ingleton, the road intersected with the Keighley and Kendal Turnpike.

== Present day ==
The route of Cam High Road between Bainbridge and Gearstones is now a popular walking track and hosts both the Pennine Way and the Dales Way along parts of its length.

The route from Richmond to Askrigg is still in use as a local road and the section from Bainbridge to Hawes is part of the A684. The road through Widdale from Hawes all the way to Ingleton is the B6255, and the last section into Lancaster is partly on the A683. The B6255 road between Hawes and Ingleton has six mileposts. which are all grade II listed.

== See also ==
- Keighley and Kendal Turnpike
