= Cotter Force =

Waterfall in North Yorkshire, England

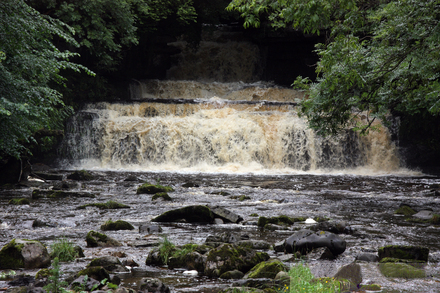
- Cotter Force
- Interactive map of Cotter Force
- Location: Wensleydale, North Yorkshire, England
- OS grid: SD848920
- Coordinates: 54°19′4″N 2°14′0″W
- Type: Step
- Total height: 33 feet (10 m)
- Number of drops: 6

Cotter Force is a small waterfall on Cotterdale Beck, a minor tributary of the River Ure, near the mouth of Cotterdale, a side dale in Wensleydale, North Yorkshire, England.

== The Falls and Cotterdale Beck ==
Cotterdale Beck has several other smaller falls in its course before joining the Ure, but Cotter Force is the largest. The force is not visible from the road, but it takes only a short walk to reach it. It comprises a series of six steps each its own small waterfall with the largest single drop being about 5 feet (1.5 m). The force is narrower at 13 feet (4 m) at the top widening to 43 feet (13 m) at the bottom. A short path allows easy access from the A684 near Holme Heads Bridge approximately 2 miles (3.2 km) west of Hawes.

After the Yorkshire Dales Millennium Trust carried out an upgrade to its footpath, Cotter Force is now accessible to wheelchair users and less mobile visitors.

== References to the Force ==
The artist J. M. W. Turner sketched here in July 1816 for his Yorkshire Sketchbook. The noted 19th-century etching artist Richard Samuel Chattock is known to have created two works of Cotter Force in 1864. Both etchings now reside in The Fine Arts Museum of San Francisco.

== See also ==
- List of waterfalls
- List of waterfalls in England
