= Wether Fell =

Peak in the Yorkshire Dales, England

- Drumaldrace
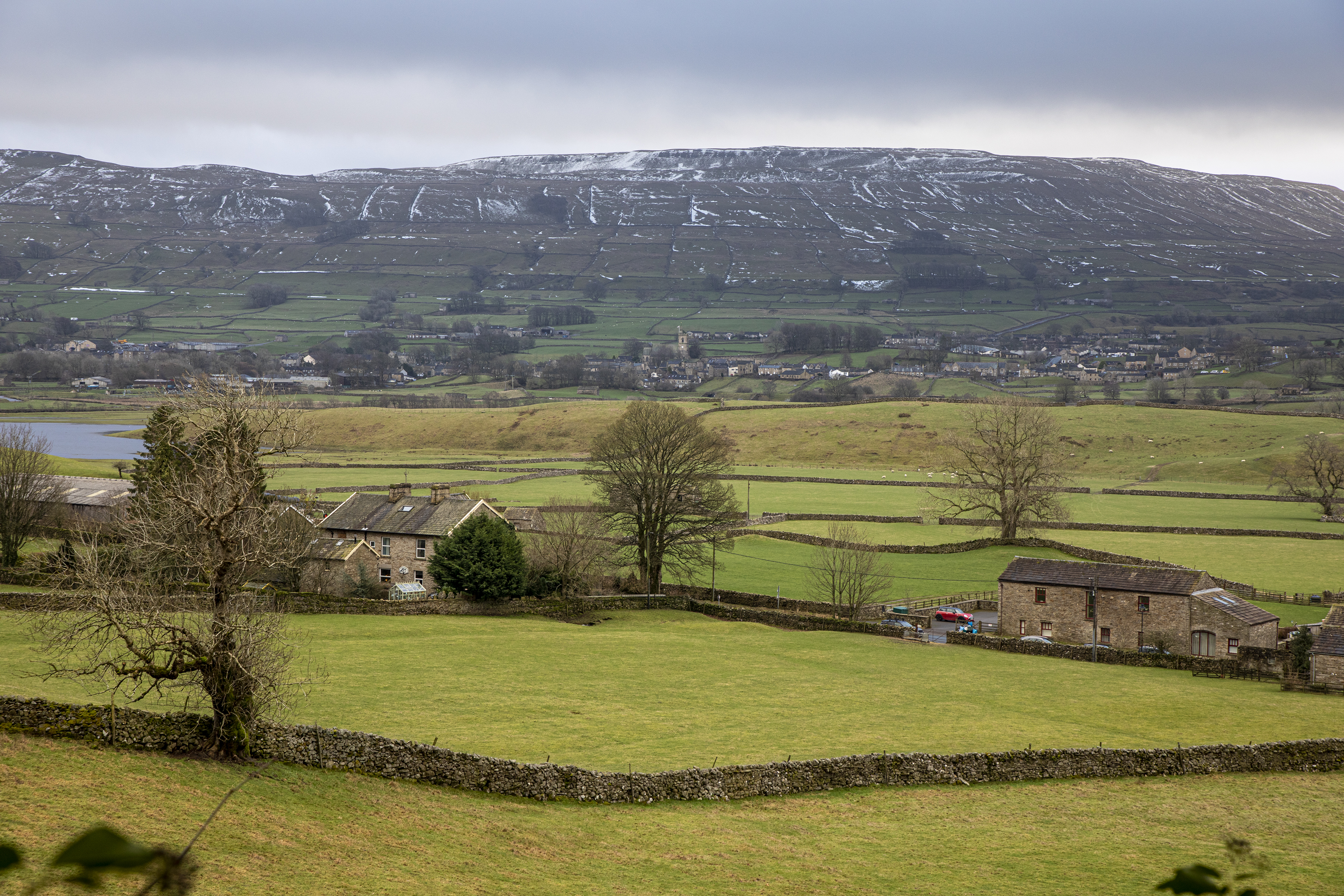
- Hawes and Wether Fell

Highest point
- Elevation: 614 m (2,014 ft)
- Coordinates: 54°16′37″N 2°11′28″W

Geography
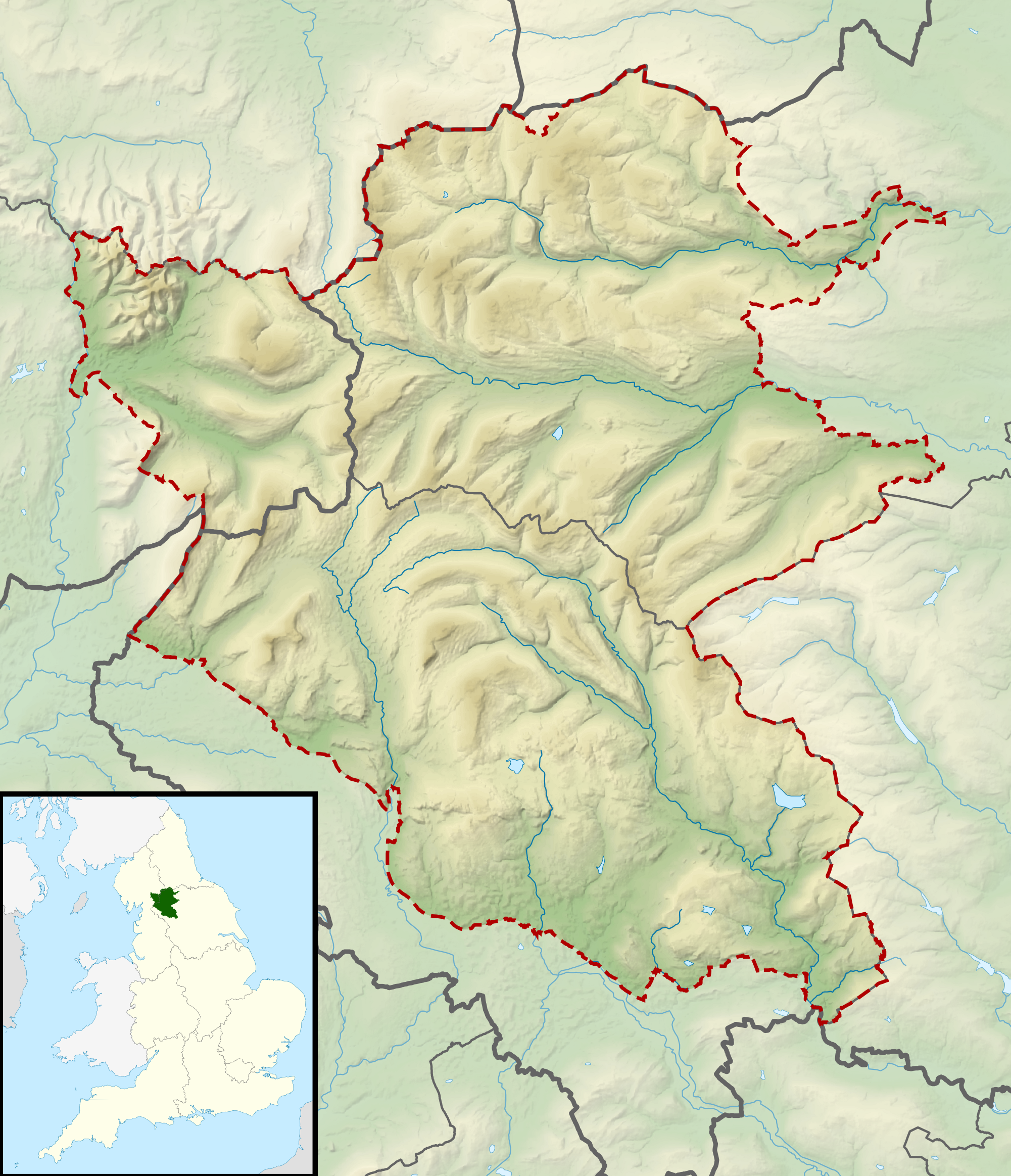
- Location within Yorkshire Dales
- Location: Wensleydale, North Yorkshire
- Country: England
- OS grid: SD876869

Wether Fell (archaically Wetherfell), also known as Drumaldrace (the name of its summit), is a mountain in the Yorkshire Dales National Park, in North Yorkshire, England. Wether Fell is mountain that divides Wensleydale in the north and Upper Wharfedale in the south. Its summit is 614 metres (2,014 ft). A Roman Road, the Cam High Road, passes along the southern edge of the summit reaching 1,900 feet (580 m).

== History ==
In the Yorkshire Dales landscape character assessment, Wether Fell is noted as being prominent within the landscape alongside Penhill and Addlebrough, and as forming a ridge dividing Raydale from Wensleydale. In their 1953 book Yorkshire Village, Marie Hartley and Joan Ingliby describe the view of Wether Fell from the north across Hawes as looking like "...the limbs and loins of a beast stretched full length filling the horizon." The geology of the fell is mostly limestone with some small outcrops of millstone grit.

Cam High Road, an old Roman Road between Ingleton and Bainbridge, goes over Wether Fell, quite close to the summit at Drumaldrace, reaching 580 metres (1,900 ft) at its highest point. This was the route taken by the Richmond to Lancaster Turnpike between 1751 and 1795, before the turnpike was diverted through Hawes, and then over Widdale to the Ribble Valley. Several cairns are also to be found on the slopes of Wether Fell, some which date back as far as the Bronze Age.

An ancient right was exercised by the people Bainbridge - the right to graze geese on Wether Fell.

The northern edge of Wether Fell is recognised as a good place for hang gliding and paragliding when the weather conditions are right. Water falling on the slopes of Wether Fell flows into just two main river systems: to the north and east, it flows into the River Ure (via the River Bain to the east), and to the south, it exits through the River Wharfe. Sloping to the north of the hill away from the summit are several old quarries, part of the Burtersett quarrying industry. The Wether Fell stone flags, typically used for footpaths through fields around Hawes, Hardraw, Gayle and Sedbusk. These flags were quarried from around a point about 1,150 feet (350 m) high. Coal was also mined from at least three locations on the steep western slope of Wether Fell, with the most notable being Storth Colliery. The seam was known as Simonstone Coal, and stretched for 4 miles (6.4 km) towards Burtersett.

The name of Wether Fell's highest peak is Drumaldrace. The origins of this are uncertain, but it is thought to be a combination of Drum (a wooded ridge), and Alban/Aldrace, a personal name.

== See also ==
- List of peaks in the Yorkshire Dales
