= Snaizeholme =

Valley in the Yorkshire Dales, England

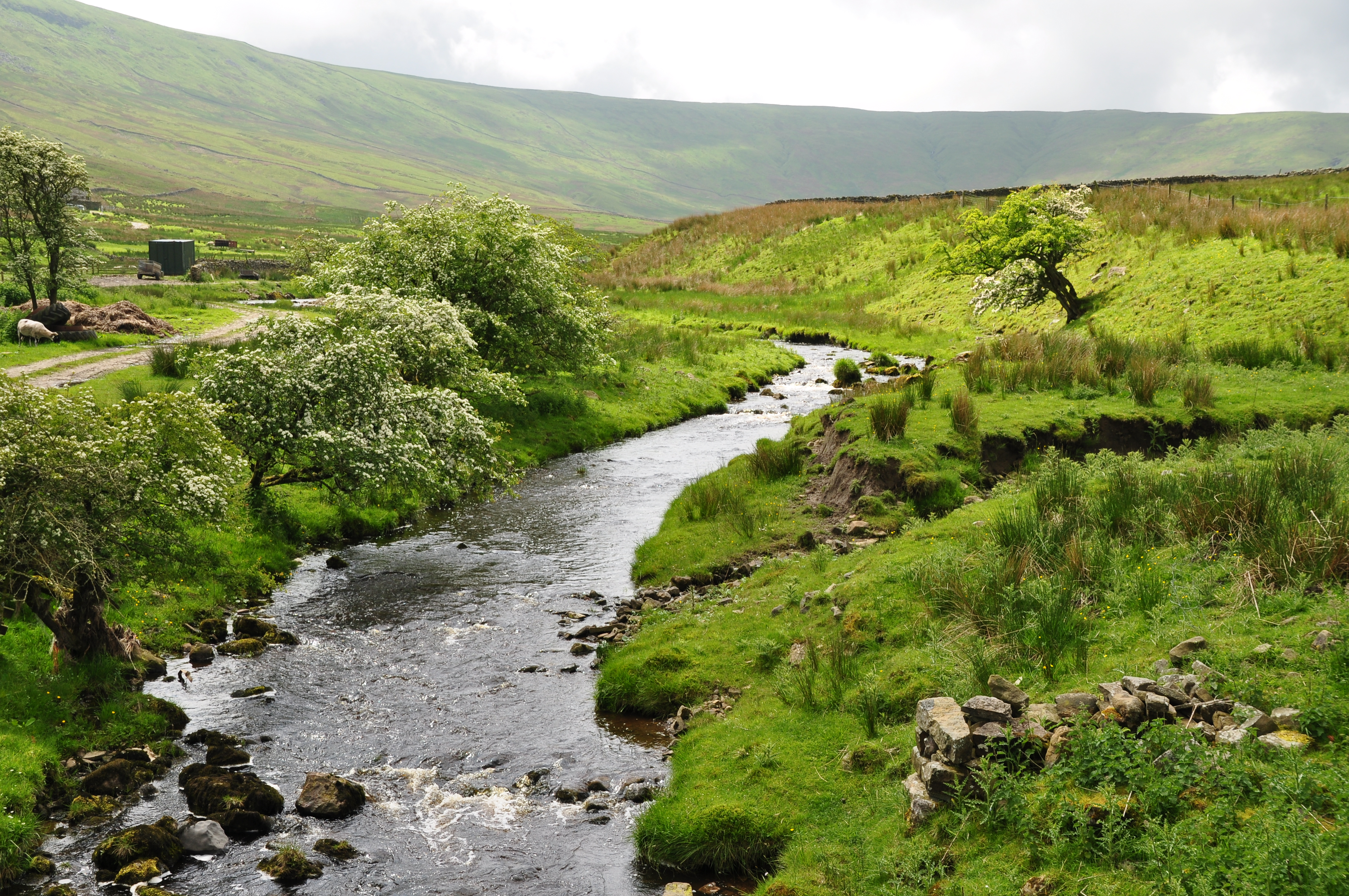
- Snaizeholme Beck, looking southwards up the valley

- Location within North Yorkshire
- Floor elevation: 878 feet (267.7 m)
- Length: 3 miles (4.8 km) North/south
- Area: 1,390 acres (561 ha)

Geology
- Type: Glacial

Geography
- Location: Wensleydale, North Yorkshire
- Country: England
- State/Province: Yorkshire and the Humber
- Coordinates: 54.262°N 2.269°W
- River: Snaizeholme Beck
- Interactive map of Snaizeholme

Snaizeholme is a small side valley of Wensleydale in the Yorkshire Dales National Park (YDNP), North Yorkshire, England. The valley is noted for its red squirrel reserve, the only place within the North Yorkshire part of the Yorkshire Dales National Park where red squirrels are known to live, and a tree re-wilding project.

Along with Ribblehead further to the west, the upper slopes of Snaizeholme are known to be one of the wettest places within the YDNP. Rainfall on Snaizeholme Fell (at 1,900 feet (579 m) is a mean average of 77 inches (1,957 mm) per year.

== History ==
It is thought that during the Anglian stage of glaciation, ice pushing south from the main Wensleydale stem, created the bowl shaped nature of the upper valley. The amphitheatre nature of the valley is consistent with an ice-stream pushing southwards towards Grove Head and into Wharfedale. The settlement of the Norse people in Wensleydale lent their language to the name of the valley; Sneis meaning twig led to the name being translated as the water-meadow with twigs. It was first recorded in 1280 as Snaysum or Snaysome, when the vaccary (a name for the cattle farms in upland regions of the Pennines) was listed as £6 per year (equivalent to £6,000 in 2025). In the seventeenth century, a survey listed the valley as being either Snaisholme or Snailsholme, which was in the township of Hawes with a population of nine, eight house, 30 outhouses and 268 acres (108 ha) of meadow lands. A directory from 1893 shows that most people (if not all) in the dale were farmers and their families.

The valley is in a rough north/south direction, extending to 3 miles (4.8 km) in length, and covering an area of 1,390 acres (561 ha). Snaizeholme Beck drains the valley northwards into Widdale Beck, both tributaries of the River Ure. Snaizeholme Beck flows for 4.2 miles (6.7 km) and drains an area of 2,790 acres (1,131 ha). The beck is fed by 21 streams, all of which total a complete length of 26 miles (42 km), and between 1970 and 2020, the average flow out of the beck into Widdale Beck is 7.1 cubic feet per second (0.2 m^{3}/s). The valley extends from a low of 878 feet (267.7 m) to the top of Snaizeholme Fell which is 1,793 feet (547 m).

The valley was originally part of the Forest of Wensleydale; however, farming practices have left most of the valley without tree cover. In 2021, the Woodland Trust proposed a scheme which would involve planting birch, rowan, oak, willow and Scots Pine trees across 550 acres (220 ha) of land within Snaizeholme valley. At that time, less than 5% of the Yorkshire Dales had woodland cover, with only 1% consisting of ancient woodland, the type most beneficial to wildlife. The proposal was to encourage the squirrel habitat, but also to attract otters, kingfishers, herons and grey wagtails into the valley. The trees will enable carbon to be captured, and will slow the flow of water, therefore reducing the risk of flooding.

The planting of the first 100,000 saplings began in spring 2023, with a further £8 million needed to be raised to see the project through to a successful conclusion. Besides the planting of trees, the project aims to restore 279 acres (113 ha) of blanket bog peatland, 247 acres (100 ha) of limestone pavement, and 191 acres (77 ha) of the open valley bottom. The geography of the dale has been assessed as 13% woodland, 86% grassland, and 1% bog or heath. The land is mostly carboniferous limestone, with shales and coal measures deeper down, and an isolated pocket of millstone grit to the south-east of the dale where it rises up to the peaks.

The road into the Snaizeholme stretches up from Widdale, but peters out in the middle of the valley, so the dale is only accessible by vehicle from the north. On the high ground of the eastern side of the dale is the Cam Road, an old Roman Road that was once part of the Richmond to Lancaster Turnpike, and now forms part of the route of the route of the Pennine Way. The road through the valley was traditionally another route used by drovers out of Hawes and they would get to Cam Road between Dodd Fell (to the east) and Snaizeholme Fell, (to the west). Even though the River Ure was part of the long border between the old county divisions of the West and North Ridings, Snaizeholme has always been in the either the North Riding or North Yorkshire. Historically it was in the wapentake of Hang West in the parish of Aysgarth; it is now in the parish of Hawes.

The annual ultramarathon The Fellsman, runs through the dale.

=== Rainfall ===
The dale is noted as being one of the wettest places within the Yorkshire Dales National Park, averaging between 69.7 inches (1,771 mm) and 79 inches (2,000 mm) of rainfall per year. The mean average calculated between 1968 and 2012 was 77 inches (1,957 mm). Most of the water that falls on the western and northern side of Dodd Fell, drains down to the River Ure through Snaizeholme. An extreme rainfall event in May 1959 sent floods down the valley into the River Ure, which trapped a man up to his waist in floodwater and washed away sheep and lambs. Flooding also occurred on 31 January 1995, when Low Houses recorded rainfall of 5.39 inches (136.8 mm) in 24 hours. In the floods of February 2020, the gauge at the lower end of the valley recorded a rainfall of 100 millimetres (3.9 in) in 48 hours, which was 80% of the long-term average.

Annual rainfall statistics for three weather stations in Snaizeholme
Year	Low House rainfall (Note: Located at gridref SD832878, and at a height of 899 feet (274 m))	Mirk Pot Farm rainfall (Note: Located at gridref SD828870, and at a height of 1,024 feet (312 m))	Top Snaizeholme rainfall (Note: Located at gridref SD830834, and at a height of 1,900 feet (579 m))	Ref
1968	1,633 millimetres (64.3 in)	1,782 millimetres (70.2 in)	2,093 millimetres (82.4 in)	
1973	1,161 millimetres (45.7 in)	1,352 millimetres (53.2 in)	1,589 millimetres (62.6 in)	
1978	1,471 millimetres (57.9 in)	1,538 millimetres (60.6 in)	(no data)	
1983	1,551 millimetres (61.1 in)	(data spoiled)	2,015 millimetres (79.3 in)	
1988	1,985 millimetres (78.1 in)	(no data)	2,085 millimetres (82.1 in)	
1993	1,823 millimetres (71.8 in)	(no data)	(no data)	
1995	1,500 millimetres (59 in)	(no data)	(no data)	

== Red squirrel reserve ==
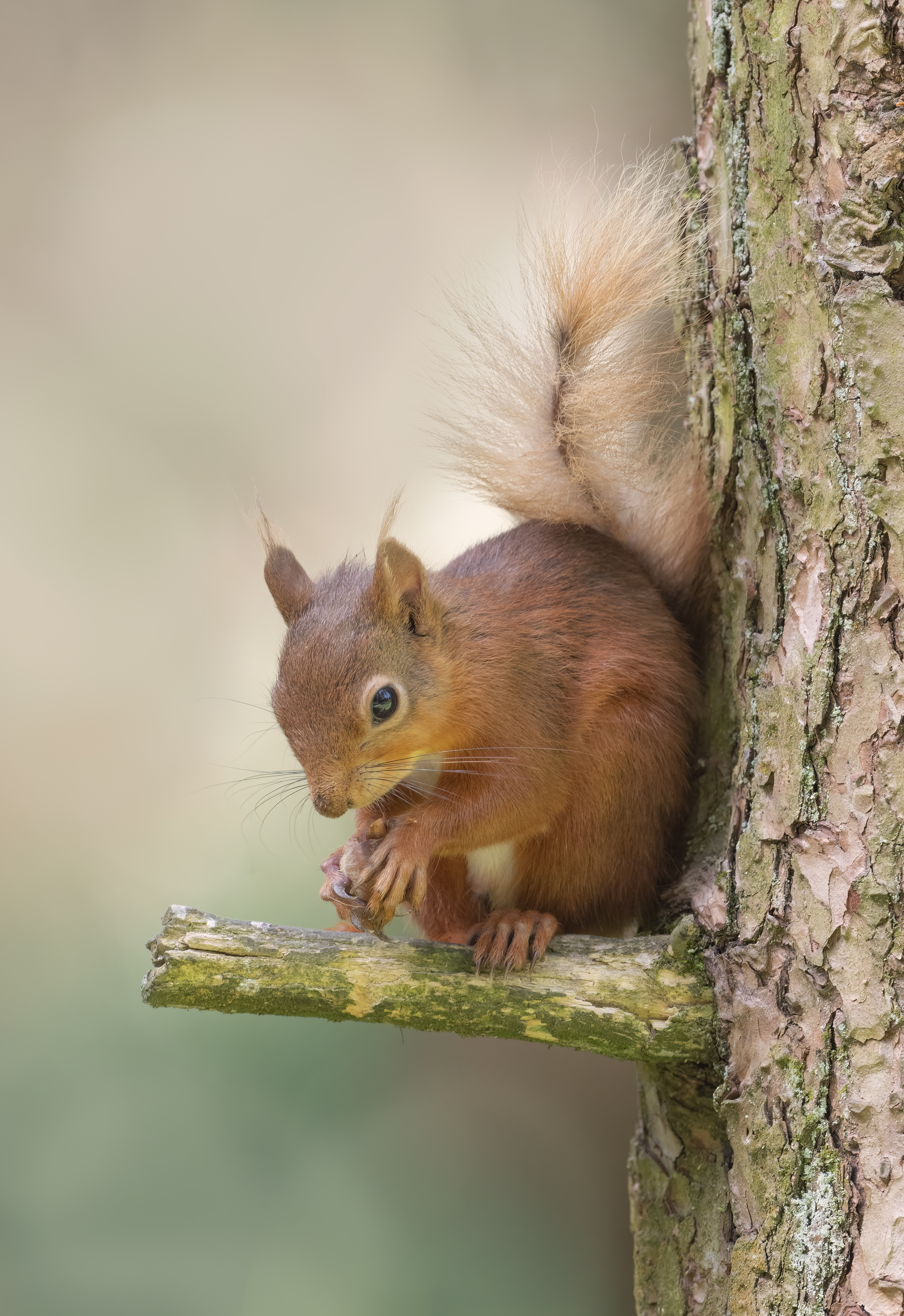
Red Squirrel in Snaizeholme

The reserve for red squirrels at Snaizeholme (SD828863) is one of 17 dotted around Northern England, and is the only location within North Yorkshire part of the Yorkshire Dales National Park where squirrels are known to exist. The Cumbrian part of the YDNP is also home to red squirrels. The squirrels first arrived in the dale c. 2002 (probably from Cumbria) as a result of a couple buying Mirk Pot Farm in 1967 and starting a Christmas tree plantation and other forestry schemes which enabled a good habitat for the squirrels. The conservation and reserve status has been so successful, that red squirrels have been spotted in gardens in Hawes, the nearest town, and Bainbridge further down the valley. The creation of new woodland, including deciduous trees, has also benefitted other wildlife, with bird species increased from thirty types to seventy, and water voles and pine martens spotted in the valley.

Access to the reserve is either a 10-mile (16 km) circular walk from Hawes, or being dropped off at the bottom of the wooded plantation by the Little White Bus (a small but dedicated bus service that serves the local community.
