= Great Knoutberry Hill =

Mountain in the Yorkshire Dales, England

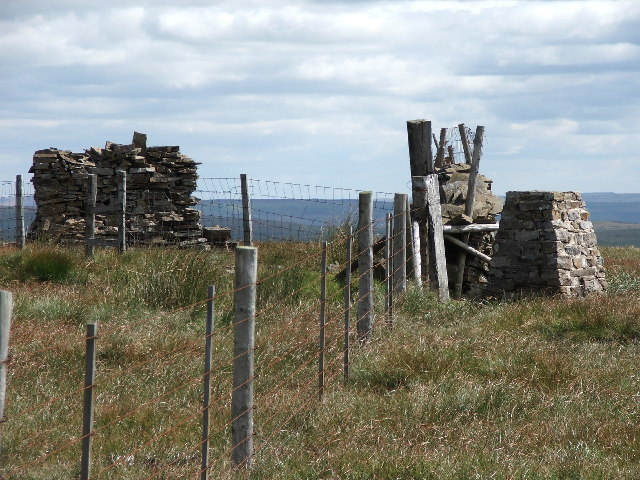
- Trig point at the summit

Highest point
- Elevation: 672 m (2,205 ft)
- Prominence: c. 254 m
- Parent peak: Whernside
- Listing: Marilyn, Hewitt, Nuttall
- Coordinates: 54°16′45″N 2°19′38″W

Geography
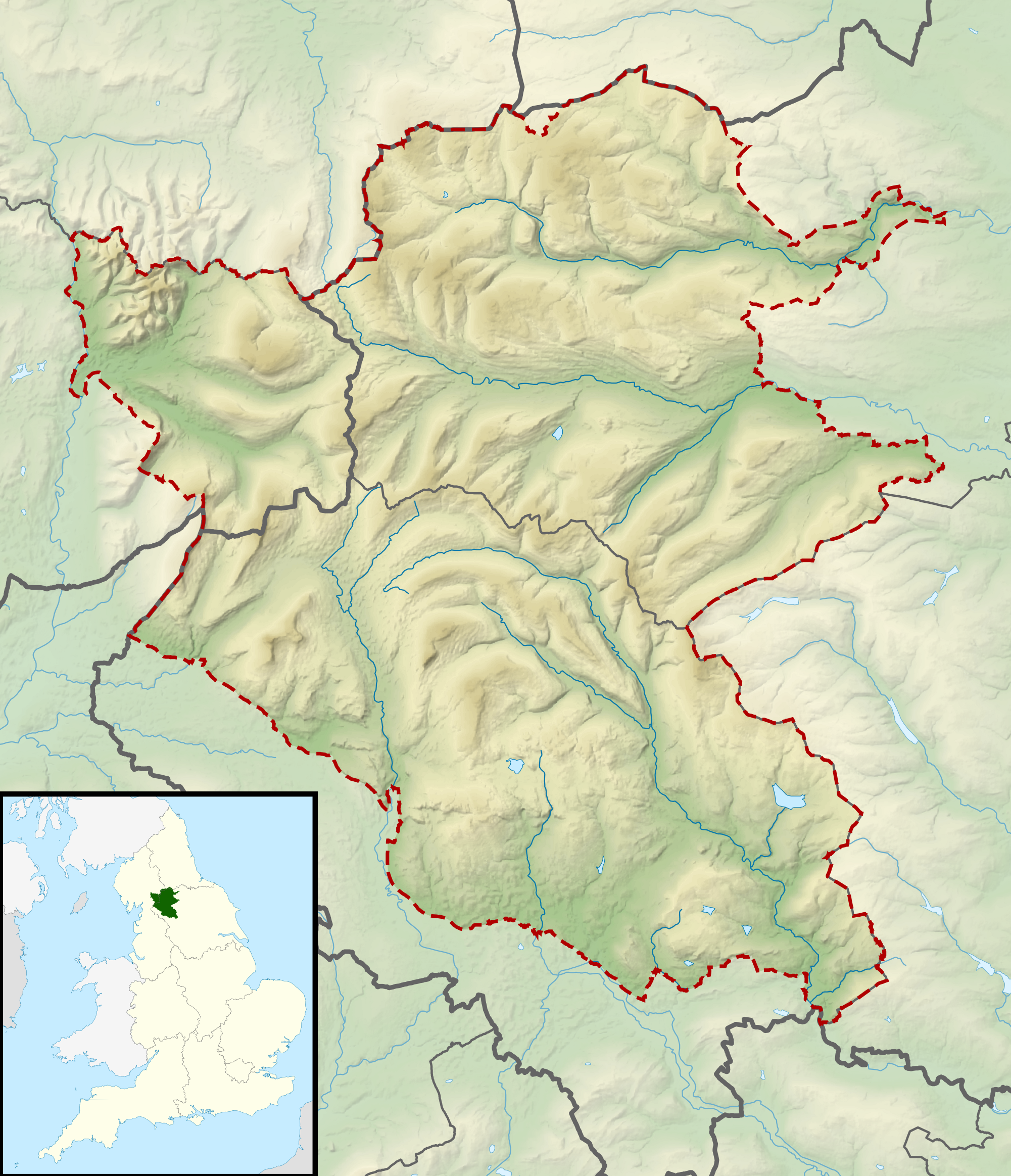
- Location within Yorkshire Dales
- Location: Yorkshire Dales, England
- OS grid: SD788871
- Topo map: OS Landranger 98

Great Knoutberry Hill, also commonly known as Widdale Fell, is a mountain located near Dent at the heads of Ribblesdale, Dentdale and Wensleydale, in the Yorkshire Dales National Park and within the boundaries of the historic county of Yorkshire. In fact, the borders between the West Riding and North Riding of Yorkshire meet at the summit, and the border between the modern administrative counties of Cumbria and North Yorkshire also runs over the fell. At a height of 2,205 feet (672 m) above sea level it is the 16th-highest fell in the Yorkshire Dales, with Rogan's Seat being exactly the same height.

Great Knoutberry Hill can be seen from the Dales Way Long Distance Footpath on long road section from Ribblesdale to Dent Head. The best approach to its summit is from this section of the Dales Way by leaving the path at Stonehouse Farm and following the Arten Gill path up Dent Fell towards Widdale and leaving it to complete the ascent before returning in the direction one came. The views are pleasant with views centralised amongst the Yorkshire three peaks, to Wild Boar Fell and the Lakeland fells to the north.
