= Addlebrough =

Fell in North Yorkshire, England

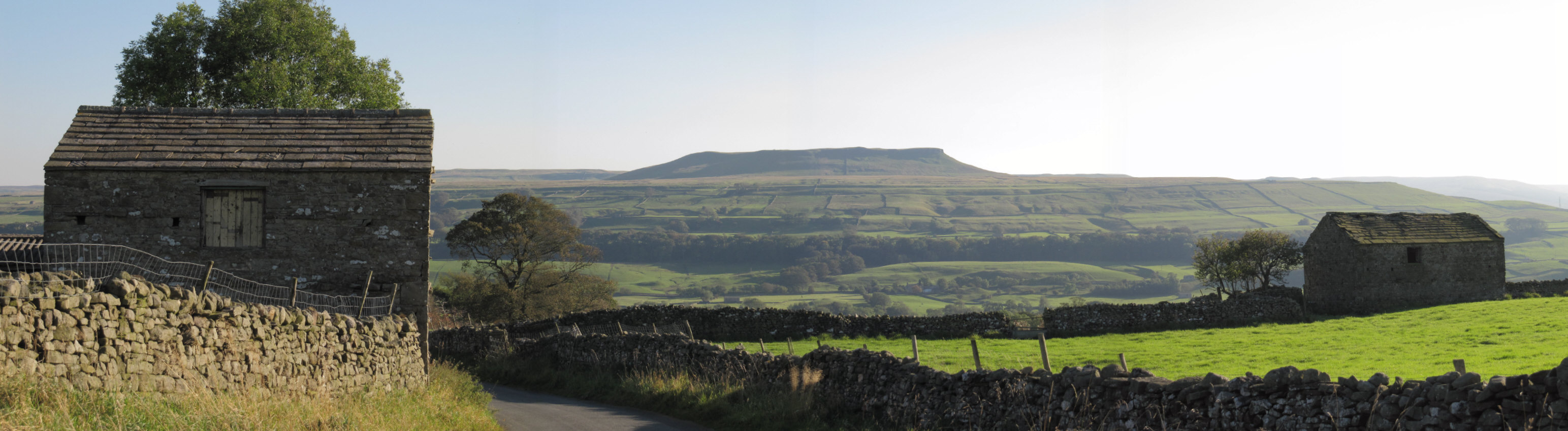
- Addlebrough from the north

Highest point
- Elevation: 481 m (1,578 ft)
- Prominence: 94 m
- Coordinates: 54°17′22″N 2°05′13″W

Geography
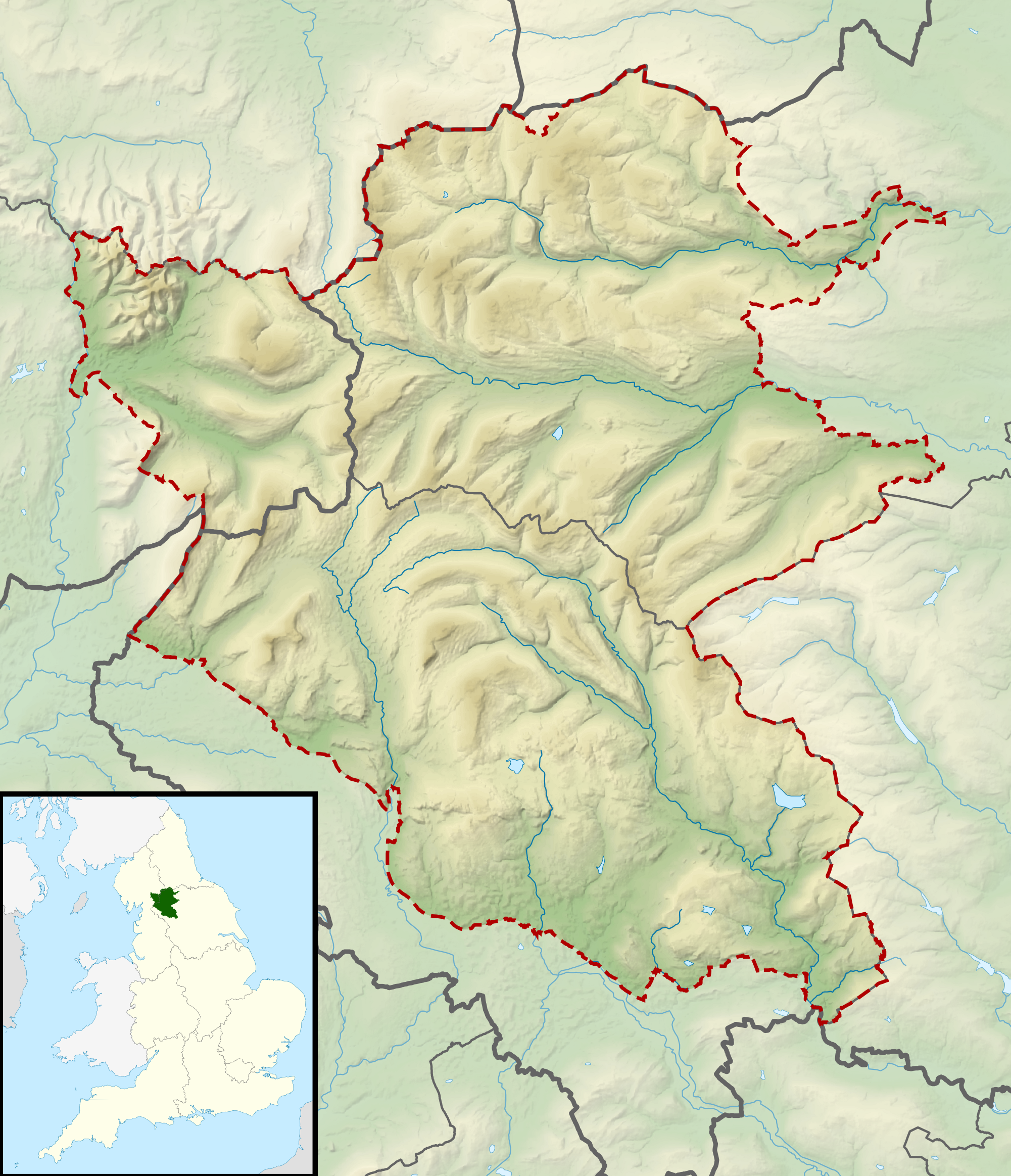
- Location within Yorkshire Dales
- Location: North Yorkshire, England
- OS grid: SD945881

Addlebrough is a fell in Wensleydale, North Yorkshire, England. It is 481 m (1,578 ft) high.

Bronze Age inhabitants built homes and enclosures on the fell's southern slopes.

== Gallery ==
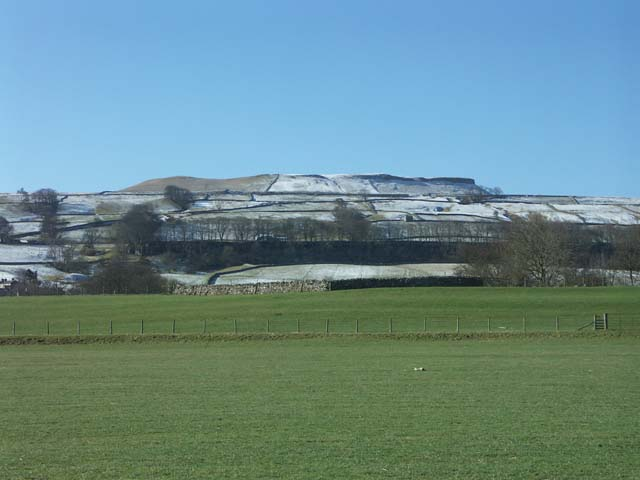
Addlebrough in winter, viewed from Askrigg Bottoms

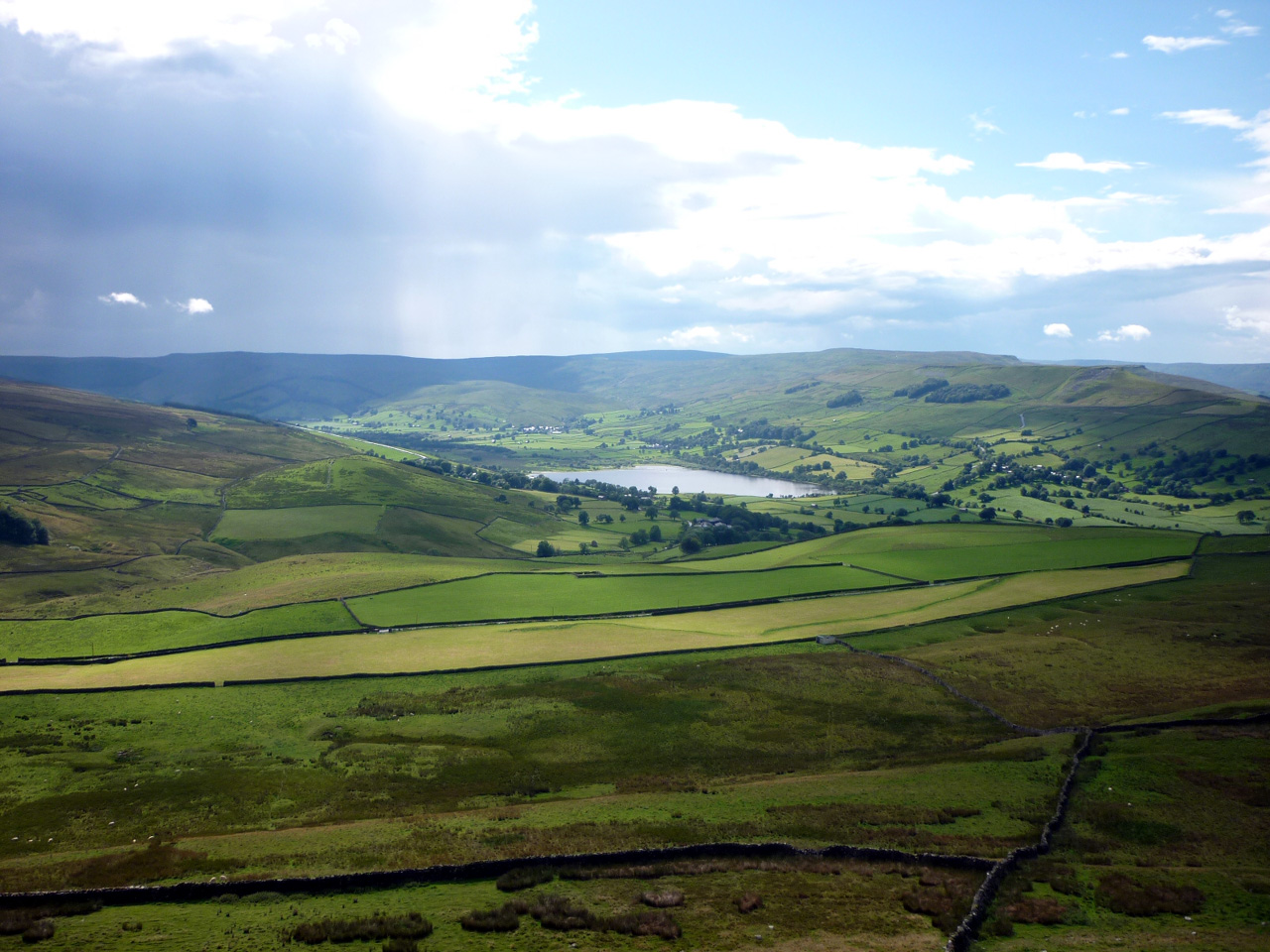
Semer Water from Addlebrough
