= Deepdale, County Durham =

Coordinates: 54.54°N 1.99°W

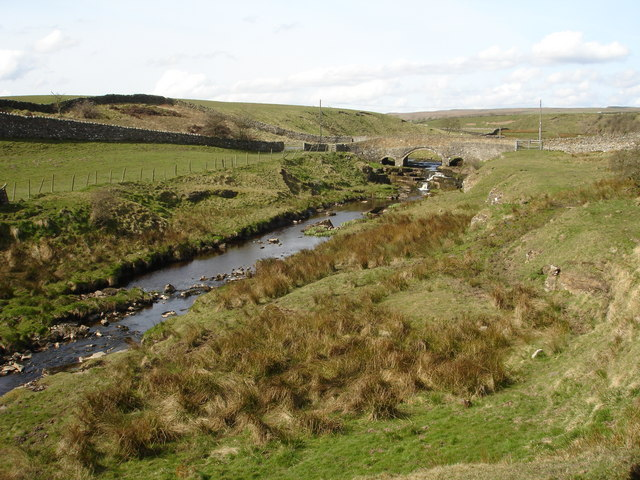
Deepdale Beck starting its descent

Deepdale, sometimes spelt Deep Dale, is a side valley of Teesdale in County Durham, England. In its lower reaches, just west of the town of Barnard Castle, the valley is well wooded, and is a nature reserve, known for its bird life and a population of otters. Deepdale Beck, a tributary of the River Tees, runs through the valley. By the beck is the Great Stone, a glacial erratic from Shap in Cumbria, one of the largest erratics in Teesdale.

The valley was once crossed by the Deepdale Viaduct, 2 miles (3 km) west of Barnard Castle. The viaduct was designed by Thomas Bouch (of the Tay Bridge disaster fame) and built in 1861 to carry the South Durham and Lancashire Union Railway. It closed in 1962 and was dismantled in 1963.

At the foot of the dale the Deepdale Aqueduct, which is also a footbridge, crosses the River Tees. It was built in 1898, and is a Grade II listed building.

Deerbolt army camp Startforth used Deepdale as a training ground until the early 1960s. The road at the bottom of the dale was tarmac with concrete bollards on each side, as you went up the road there was 2 Nissan army huts on the left side of the river a little further up on the right hand side of the road was ditches which are still there but filled with bog plants, these used to have barbed wire over them so the soldiers had to crawl under the wire through the ditches. I think there was 4 in the open area on the right of the road. The road then dips down to a concrete ford and onto the rifle ranges. The open land was used for parking and there was rifle shooting ranges aiming towards the bank next to the back of a concrete roofed building. This was used as a store, the targets were pulled up on top of the bank next to the building.
