= Appersett =

Hamlet in Wensleydale, North Yorkshire, England

Coordinates: 54.31154°N 2.21991°W

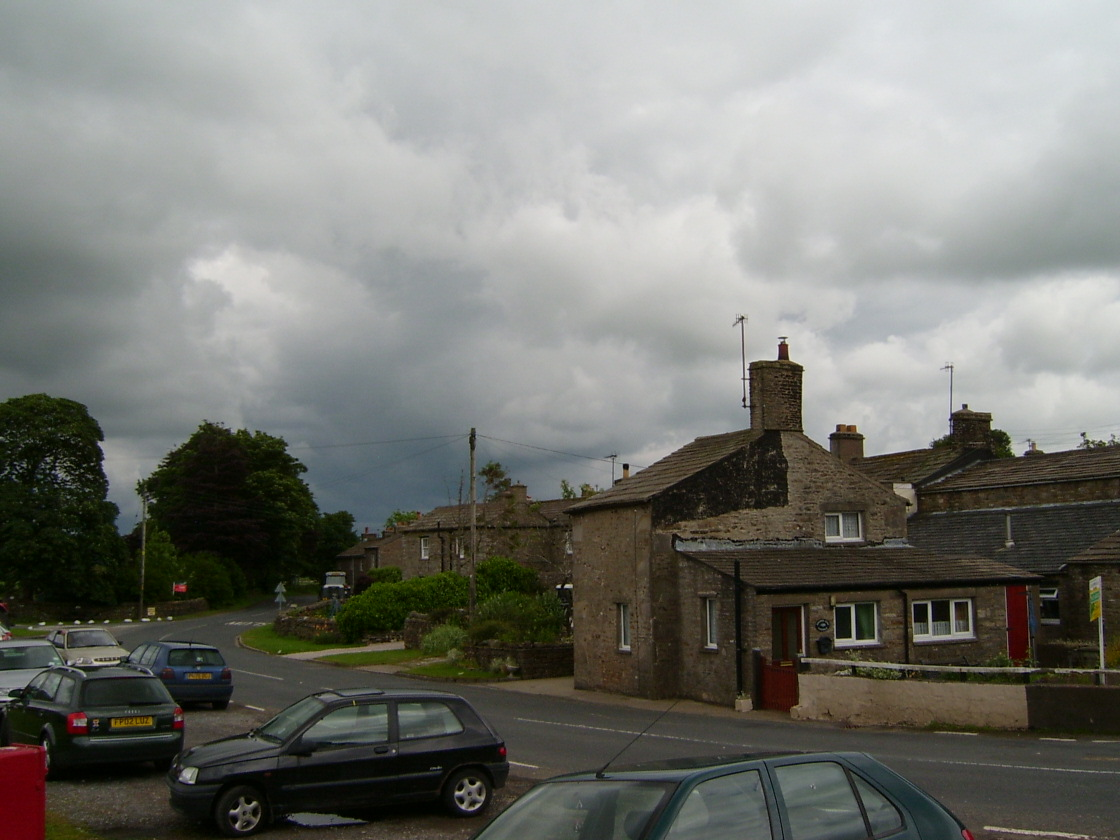
- Appersett

- Location within North Yorkshire
- OS grid reference: SD857906
- Civil parish: Hawes
- Unitary authority: North Yorkshire
- Ceremonial county: North Yorkshire
- Region: Yorkshire and the Humber
- Country: England
- Sovereign state: United Kingdom
- Post town: HAWES
- Postcode district: DL8
- Police: North Yorkshire
- Fire: North Yorkshire
- Ambulance: Yorkshire

Appersett is a hamlet in the Yorkshire Dales in the county of North Yorkshire, England one mile (1.6 km) west of Hawes. It lies on the A684 road and an unclassified road runs alongside Widdale Beck to connect with the B6255 road between Hawes and Ingleton.

== History ==
The name Appersett derives from Norse and means the 'Shieling by the apple tree'. The suffix "sett", is notable to Wensleydale (Burtersett and Countersett), with Appersett originally recorded as Appeltresate, which became Aperside and eventually, Appersett. Historically in the wapentake of Hang West and in the Parish of Aysgarth, the hamlet is now within the civil Parish of Hawes, where its population is recorded in the 2011 Census.

The bridge in the hamlet that carries the A684 over Widdale Beck, was built in the early 18th century and was widened in 1795 by the architect, John Carr. The second bridge, to the north west, is New Bridge, which spans the River Ure and was built in 1825 to allow Hawes to be connected to the Askrigg to Sedbergh Turnpike. Both bridges are now grade II listed structures. Although the hamlet is 776 feet (237 m) above sea level, it is subjected to flooding as it lies at a low point in the Wensleydale valley at the northern end of Widdale, where Widdale Beck flows into the River Ure.

The hamlet consists of only 23 dwellings and is located on the south side of the River Ure. Up until the early part of the twentieth century, the hamlet had its own Wesleyan chapel. There are no amenities in the village, aside from an art gallery which previews the work of a local artist; however, the location is a popular starting point for walks in Cotterdale and Widdale, and the hamlet is also on the Herriott Way, a 50 miles (80 km) circular walk through Swaledale and Wensleydale.

From 1974 to 2023, Appersett was part of the district of Richmondshire. It is now administered by the unitary North Yorkshire Council.

== Appersett Viaduct ==
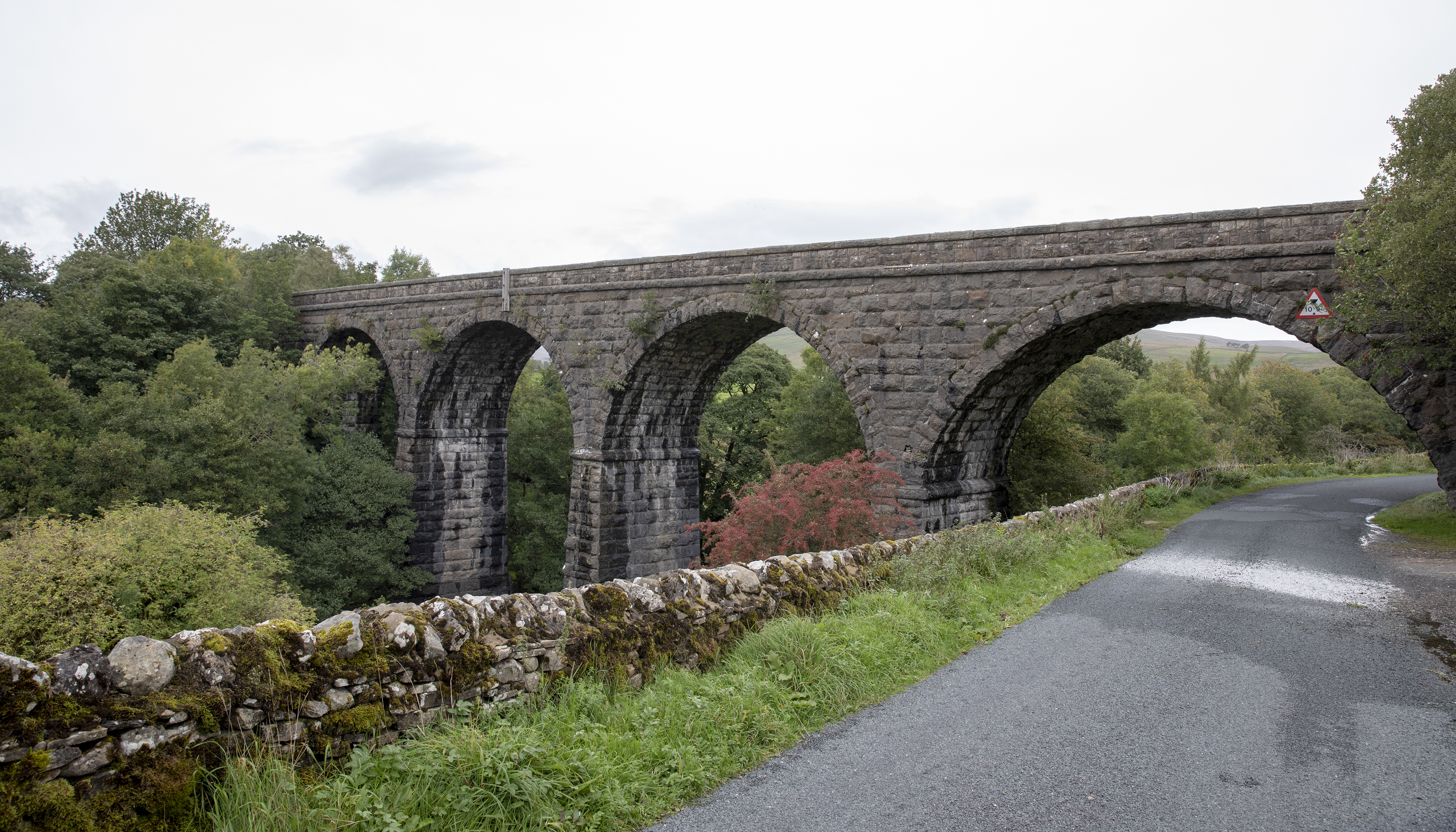
Appersett Viaduct in September 2018

To the south of the village is Appersett Viaduct, which used to carry the Northallerton to Garsdale railway line. The five-arch viaduct is 108 yards (99 m) long and is 56 feet (17 m) above Widdale Beck, which it spans (although the eastern edge also crosses an unclassified road). It was designed by J. S. Crossley, who designed most of the viaducts on the Settle and Carlisle line, and was opened in 1878 as part of the Midland Railway's branch from Garsdale (Hawes Junction) to Hawes. The line closed to passengers in 1959, with complete closure coming in 1964.

It was grade II listed in 1969 and in 1992, British Rail offered the viaduct for sale for only £1, but the new owners would be required to maintain the structure.

It is used for abseiling by a local outdoor centre, but it does feature in the plans of a resurgent railway between Hawes and Garsdale.

== See also ==
- Listed buildings in Hawes
