= Cotterdale =

Dale and hamlet in North Yorkshire, England

Coordinates: 54.341°N 2.260°W

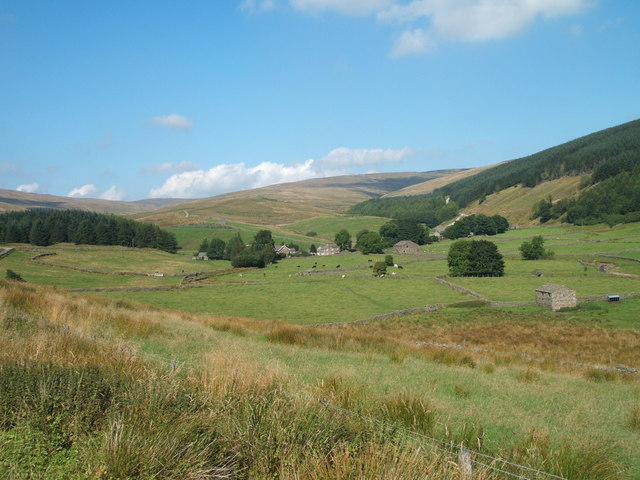
- Cotterdale and the hamlet of the same name

- Location within North Yorkshire
- Population: 12
- OS grid reference: SD833940
- Civil parish: High Abbotside
- Unitary authority: North Yorkshire
- Ceremonial county: North Yorkshire
- Region: Yorkshire and the Humber
- Country: England
- Sovereign state: United Kingdom
- Post town: Hawes
- Postcode district: DL8
- Police: North Yorkshire
- Fire: North Yorkshire
- Ambulance: Yorkshire
- UK Parliament: Richmond and Northallerton

Cotterdale is a small side dale and hamlet on the north side of Wensleydale in North Yorkshire, England. The dale lies to the west of Great Shunner Fell. It is drained by East Gill and West Gill, which between them have nine waterfalls. They join to form Cotterdale Beck, which flows over three more waterfalls, including Cotter Force, below which the beck joins the River Ure.

Historically it formed part of the North Riding of Yorkshire and the wapentake of Hang West.. From 1974 to 2023 it was part of the district of Richmondshire, it is now administered by the unitary North Yorkshire Council. It is part of the Yorkshire Dales National Park.

The place name is thought to be derived from the Old Norse kotar, meaning "huts".

An Iron Age sword, with bronze scabbard, was found in Cotterdale, and is now in the British Museum.

A Primitive Methodist chapel existed in Cotterdale from 1835 to 1967; the chapel building is now a private house.
