= Widdale =

Small valley in the Yorkshire Dales, England

Coordinates: 54.20276°N 2.1536°W

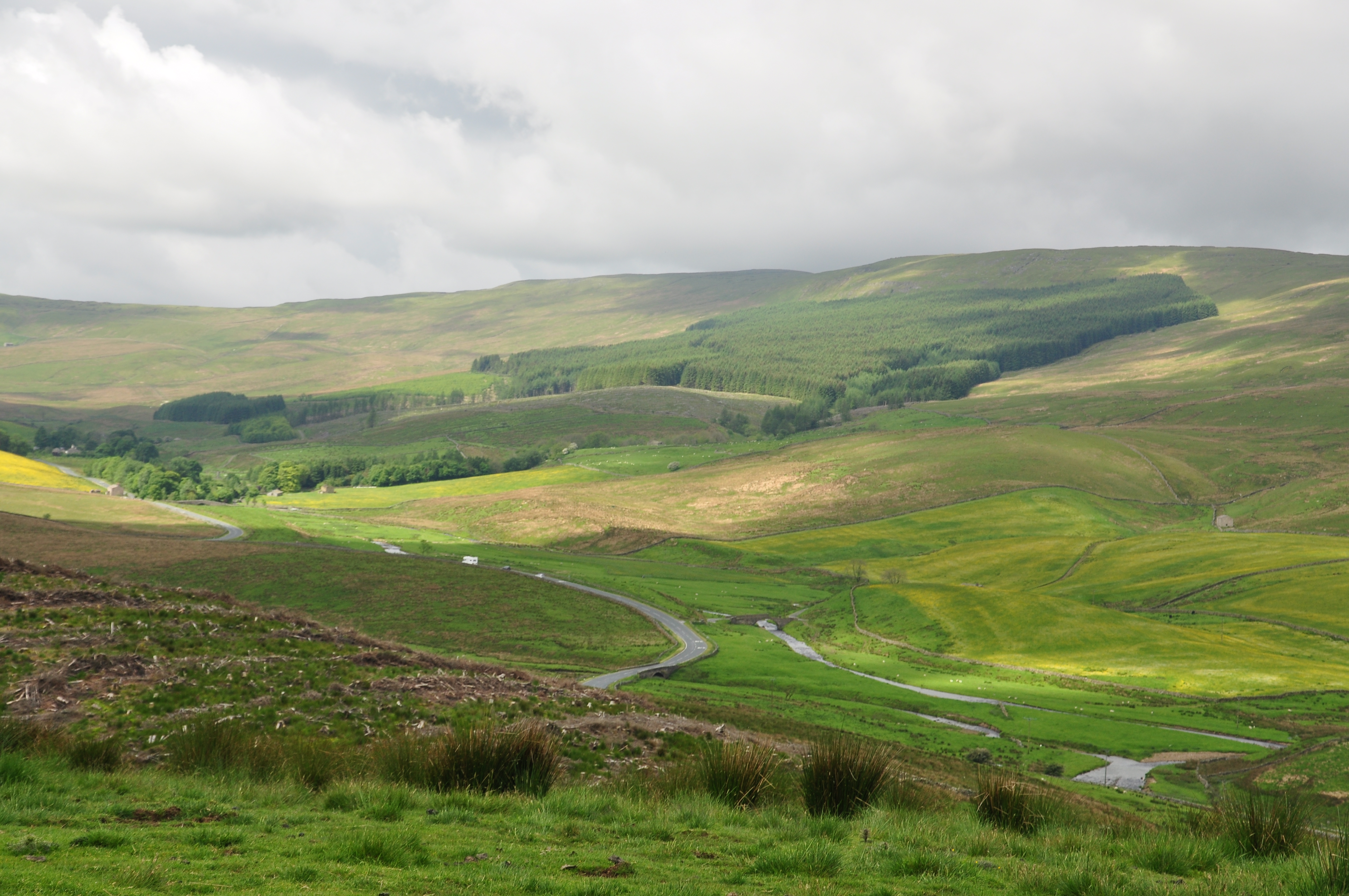
- Widdale from Snaizeholme Pasture

- Location within North Yorkshire
- OS grid reference: SD835886
- Civil parish: Hawes
- Unitary authority: North Yorkshire
- Ceremonial county: North Yorkshire
- Region: Yorkshire and the Humber
- Country: England
- Sovereign state: United Kingdom
- Postcode district: DL8
- Police: North Yorkshire
- Fire: North Yorkshire
- Ambulance: Yorkshire

Widdale is a small side dale on the south side of Wensleydale in North Yorkshire, England. The dale lies to the east of Great Knoutberry Hill (also known as Widdale Fell) and is bounded on the west by Dentdale, south by Sleddale and north by Mossdale. It is drained by Widdale and Snaizeholme Becks which feed the waters north into the River Ure at Appersett. The name Widdale means 'The Wooded Valley' in Old Norse.

The dale itself is 5 miles (8 km) long from Newby Head Moss in the south west to Appersett in the north east. The B6255 road (which was once a turnpike) traverses much of the dale but veers off about 1.2 miles (2 km) south of Appersett to go directly east into Hawes. There is a minor road (Lanacar Lane) which connects the B6255 to the A684 road at Appersett, but this is narrow with a 10 feet 9 inches (3.28 m) height restriction under Appersett Viaduct. Appersett viaduct itself used to carry the railway through Wensleydale and was closed to railway traffic in 1958. Abseilers use the viaduct at present, but the Wensleydale Railway have an ambition to re-open the line all the way to Garsdale.

The southern edge of the dale that carries Snaizeholme Beck is also designated as a red squirrel reserve. Transport is laid on by arrangement from Hawes to drop people off at the edge of the reserve.

Apart from Appersett (which only has 23 dwellings) there are no villages or hamlets in the dale. There are a few homesteads and farms scattered around the dale though.
