= Dale (landform) =

Open valley

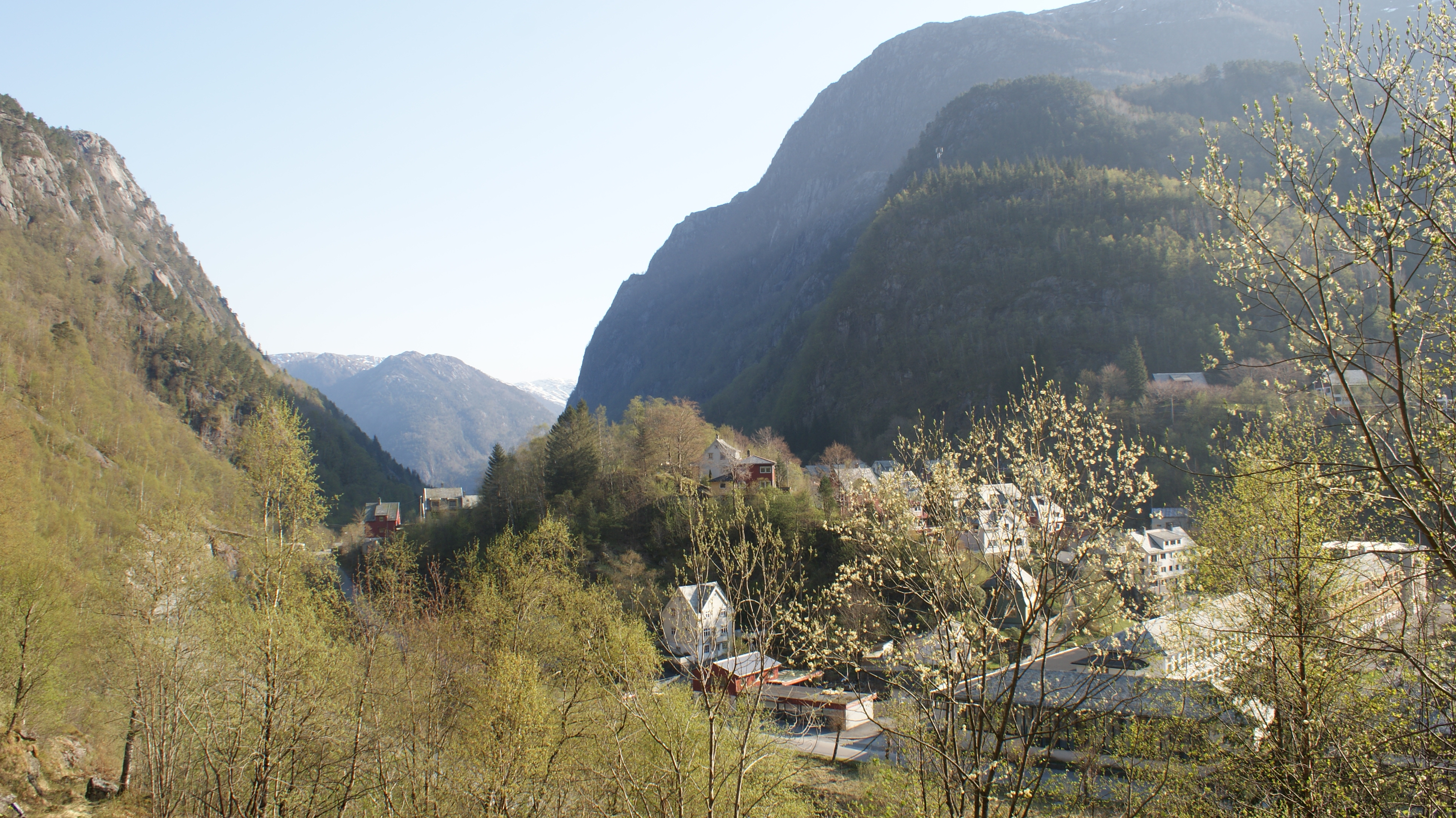
Dale, Vaksdal is located in a dale (valley; note the variant spellings of the center and the Norwegian municipality)

A dale is a valley, especially an open, gently-sloping ground between low hills with a stream flowing through it. It is used most frequently in Yorkshire and the Southern Uplands of Scotland; the term "fell" commonly refers to mountains or hills that flank a dale. As with many other words, dale was preserved by Viking influence in Northern England.

It appears in various contexts, such as “up hill and down dale”, “over every hill and dale”, and “up all hills, down all dales”.

== Etymology ==
The word dale comes from the Old English word dæl, from which the word "dell" also derived. It is related to Old Norse word dalr (and the modern Icelandic word dalur, etc.), which may have influenced its survival in northern England. The Germanic origin is assumed to be *dala-. Dal- in various combinations is common in placenames in Norway. Modern English valley and French vallée are claimed to be related to dale. A distant relative of dale is currency unit dollar, stemming from German thaler or daler, short for Joachimsthaler coins manufactured in the town of Joachimsthal in Bohemia.

The word is perhaps related to Welsh dol (meadow, pasture, valley), Russian dol (valley, reverse side) and Serbian/Croatian/Bulgarian/Russian dolina (basin, doline is a geological term for certain surface depressions in karst areas). The uses are semantic equivalents to many words and phrases, suggesting a common Indo-European affinity. Vale and thalweg are also related.

| Word/phrase | Language |
|---|---|
| dal | Afrikaans/Dutch |
| dal | Chechen |
| Tal (prior spelling: Thal), Delle | German |
| dal | Norwegian/Swedish/Danish |
| даліна (dalina) | Belarusian |
| долина (dolina) | Serbian/Croatian/Bulgarian/Russian/Ukrainian |
| vale, dolină | Romanian |
| dolec, dolek | Slovenian |
| údolí, důl | Czech |
| dolina | Polish |
| údolie, dolina | Slovak |
| دره (dære) | Persian |
| دۆڵ (doll) | Kurdish |

== Uses ==
The following are several examples of major dales that have the name dale. The river name is usually appended with "-dale". There are also many smaller dales; this is not an exhaustive list (see dale (place name element) for more).

- Airedale (Yorkshire)
- Annandale (Scottish Lowlands)
- Coquetdale (Northumberland)
- Ennerdale (Cumberland)
- Eskdale (Cumberland)
- Eskdale (Scottish Lowlands)
- Eskdale (Yorkshire)
- Lauderdale (Scottish Lowlands)
- Lonsdale or Lunesdale (Lancashire-Westmorland)
- Rochdale (Greater Manchester)
- Teesdale (Durham)
- Tweeddale (Scottish Lowlands)
- Tynedale (Northumberland)
- Weardale (County Durham and Yorkshire)
- Wensleydale or Yoredale (Yorkshire)
- Yorkshire Dales

The name Wuppertal (North Rhine-Westphalia) is similar in form.
