= Wensleydale =

Upper valley of the River Ure in North Yorkshire, England

Coordinates: 54.3056°N 2.16667°W

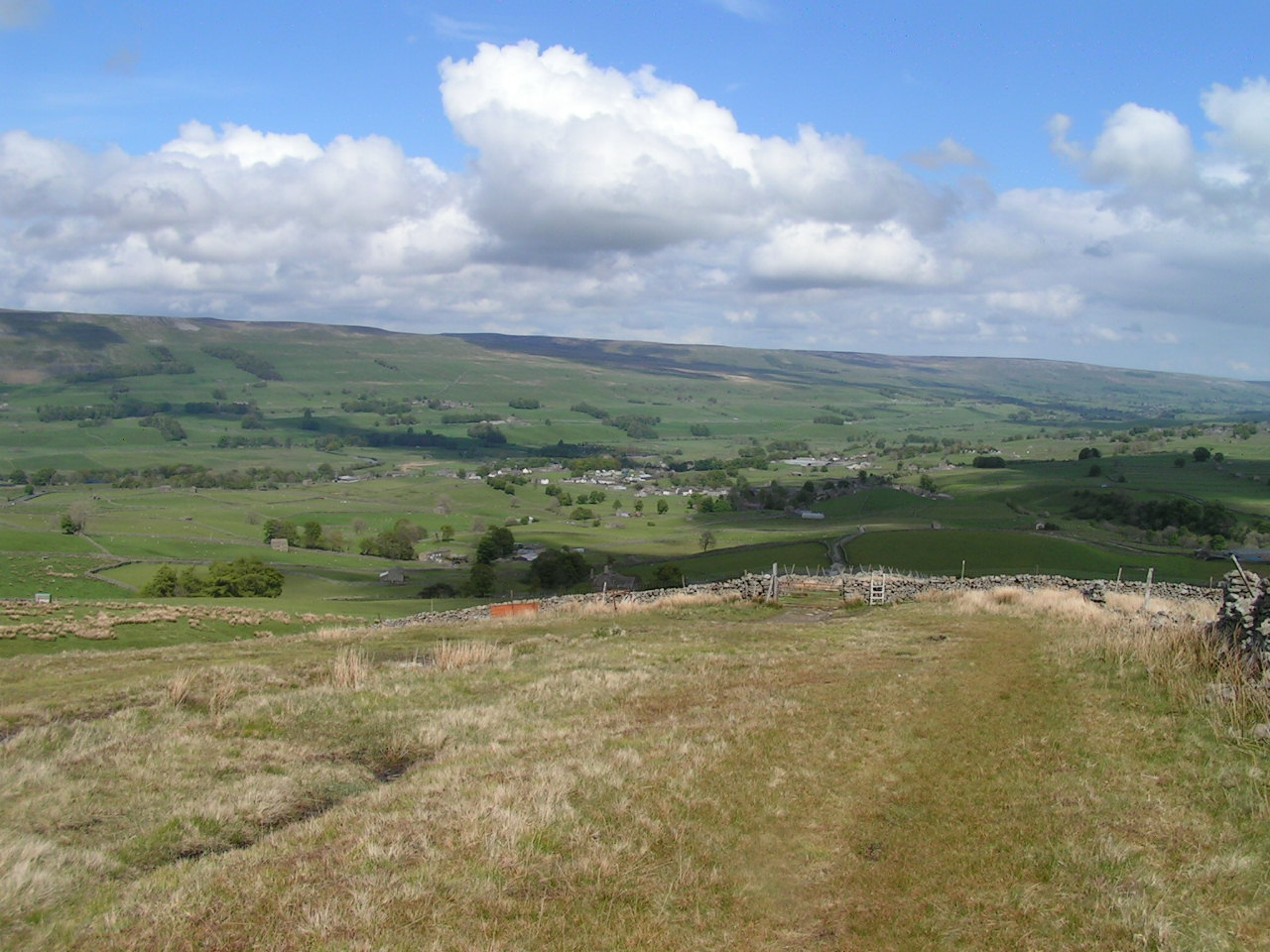
Wensleydale near Hawes

Wensleydale is a valley in North Yorkshire, England. It is one of the Yorkshire Dales, which are part of the Pennines. The dale is named after the village of Wensley, formerly the valley's market town. The principal river of the valley is the Ure, which is the source of the alternative name Yoredale. The majority of the dale is within the Yorkshire Dales National Park; the part below East Witton is within the national landscape of Nidderdale.

Addlebrough, at 481 metres (1,578 feet), dominates the landscape of the upper dale, and Penhill, at 526 metres (1,726 feet), is prominent in the lower dale. The dale lends its name to the Yoredale Group of Carboniferous rocks. The dale is famous for its cheese, with the main commercial production at Hawes.

== History ==
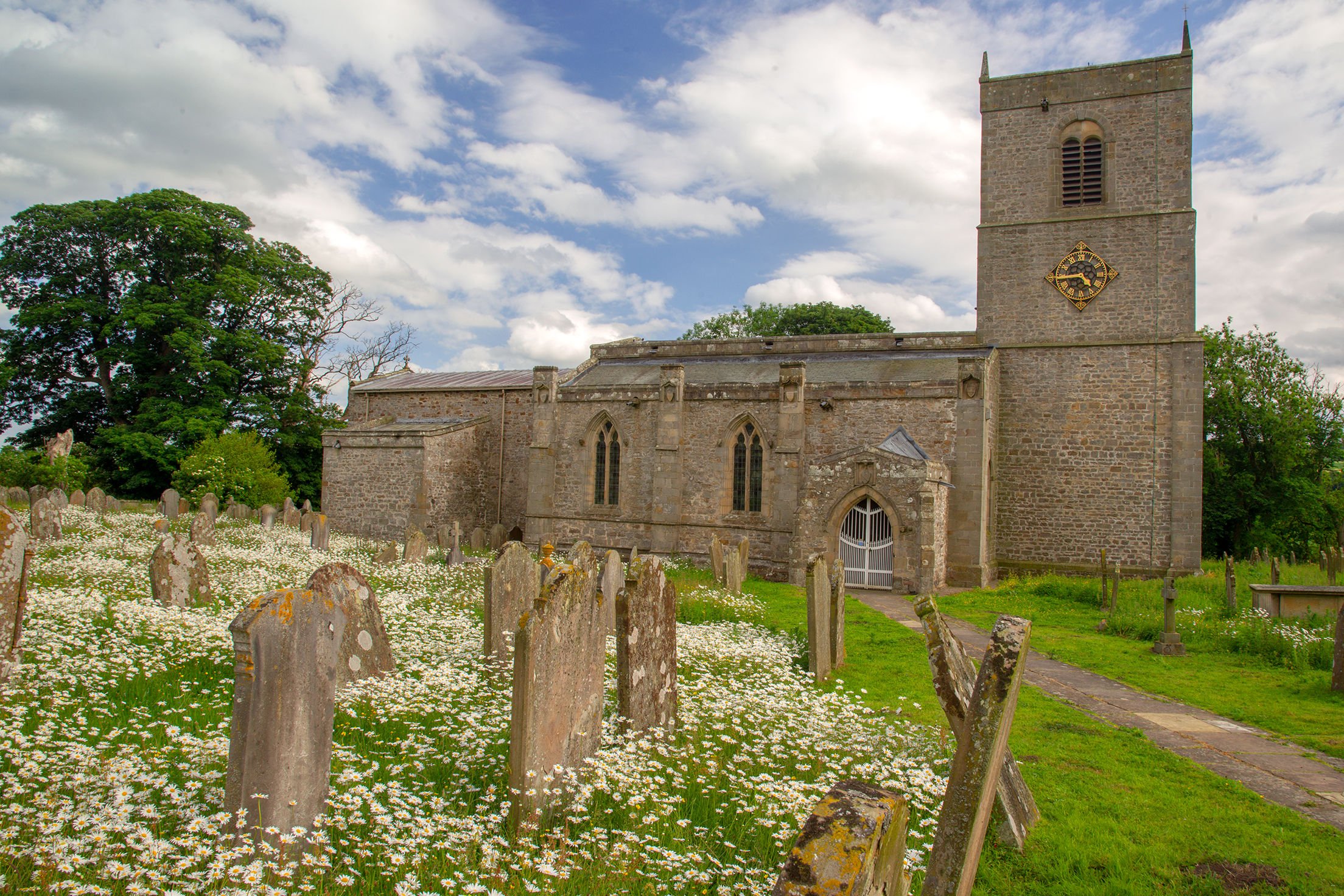
Holy Trinity, originally called Wensley Church

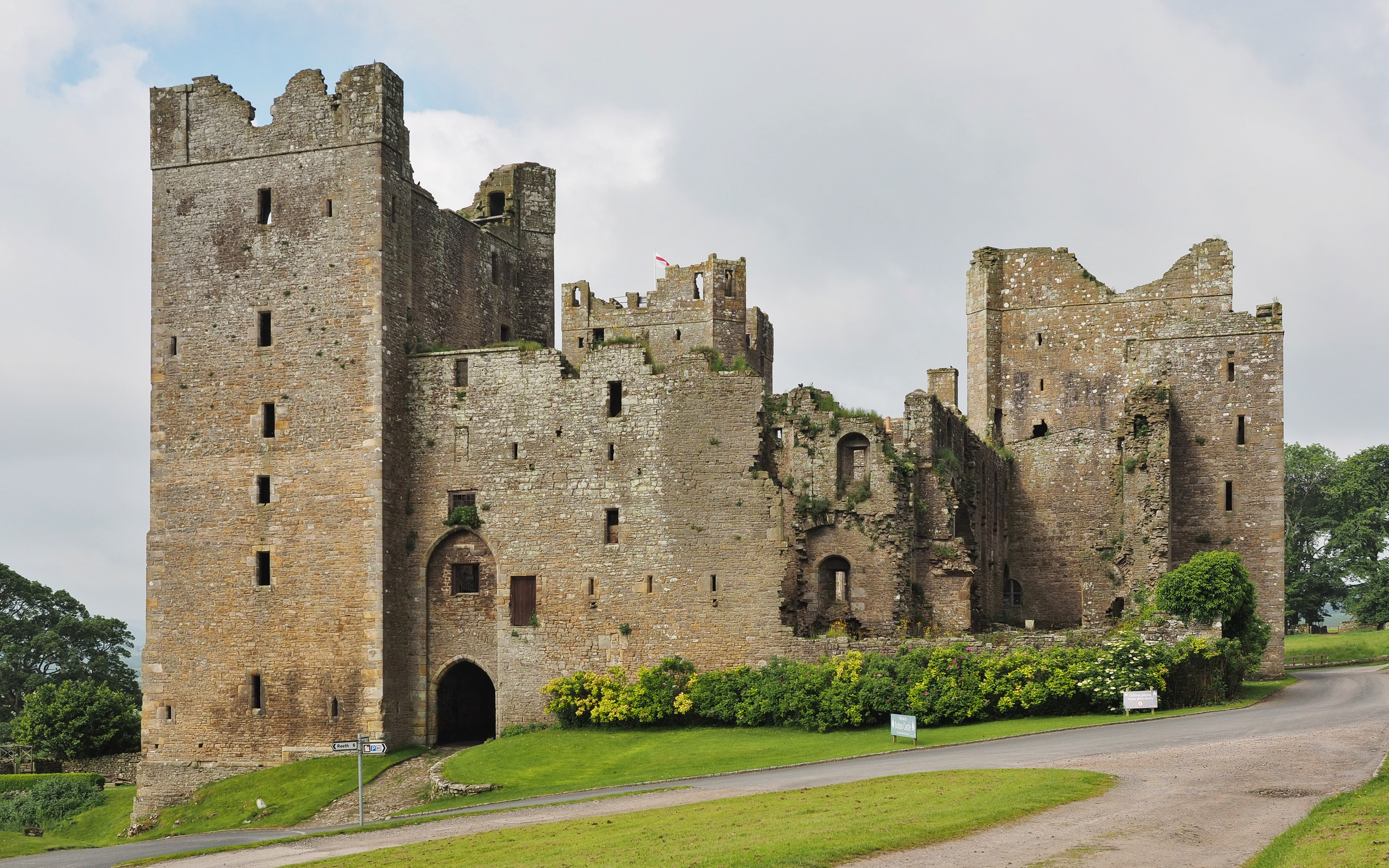
Bolton Castle, 2014

At the time of the Domesday Book in 1086, Wensley included two berewicks [a portion of farmland], "one of 4 and another of 3 carucates [units of land area], each attached to Count Alan's manor of East Witton". The Count's entire holding in the area included only 11 villagers, 2 smallholders and 18 ploughlands. By 1199, Wensley Church, under the patronship of "Niel son of Alexander", was in operation.

Wensley became the primary village of the valley, receiving its Royal Charter in 1202; that allowed for the creation of a market. Wensleydale was the home of one of Yorkshire's most famous clans, the Metcalfes, after they emigrated from Dentdale. The Metcalfe Society hold records dating back to Metcalfes living in the area during the 14th century. They were one of the most prominent families in Yorkshire for more than five centuries. Sir James Metcalfe (1389–1472), who was born and lived in Wensleydale, was a captain in the army which fought with King Henry V in the Battle of Agincourt in 1415. A fortified manor, Nappa Hall near Askrigg, was built by his son Sir Thomas Metcalfe.

During the 16th and 17th century, the primary industries were lead and coal works but limeworks were also common. A 1914 report stated that "old smelting-mills, quarries and limekilns abound; freestone and lime are still worked". In 1563, the plague reached this area; residents of Wensely who survived settled in Leyburn; "Wensley never fully recovered from that tragedy" and by 1686, Leyburn had become the main settlement and the valley's market town.

Bolton Castle, in the village of Castle Bolton, is a notable local historic site. Building of the structure was begun by Richard le Scrope, Lord Treasurer and Lord Chancellor to Richard II, in 1378. The building was finally completed in c.1399; the total cost was approximately 18,000 marks. Mary, Queen of Scots, was imprisoned there for six months, ending in January 1569, under head keeper Sir Francis Knollys, housed in the apartment of Henry Scrope; she was allowed a retinue of 51, with 30 housed in the castle. The story goes that she once escaped and made her way towards Leyburn but was captured at a spot on "The Shawl" called "Queen's Gap".

By 1846 the railway had reached Wensleydale, on a line between Northallerton and Bedale; it was extended in 1856, to carry passengers from Leeming Bar to Bedale. Wensley railway station opened in 1877; by 1878, there were also stations in Northallerton, Leeming Bar, Bedale, Leyburn, Hawes and Garsdale.

== Geography ==
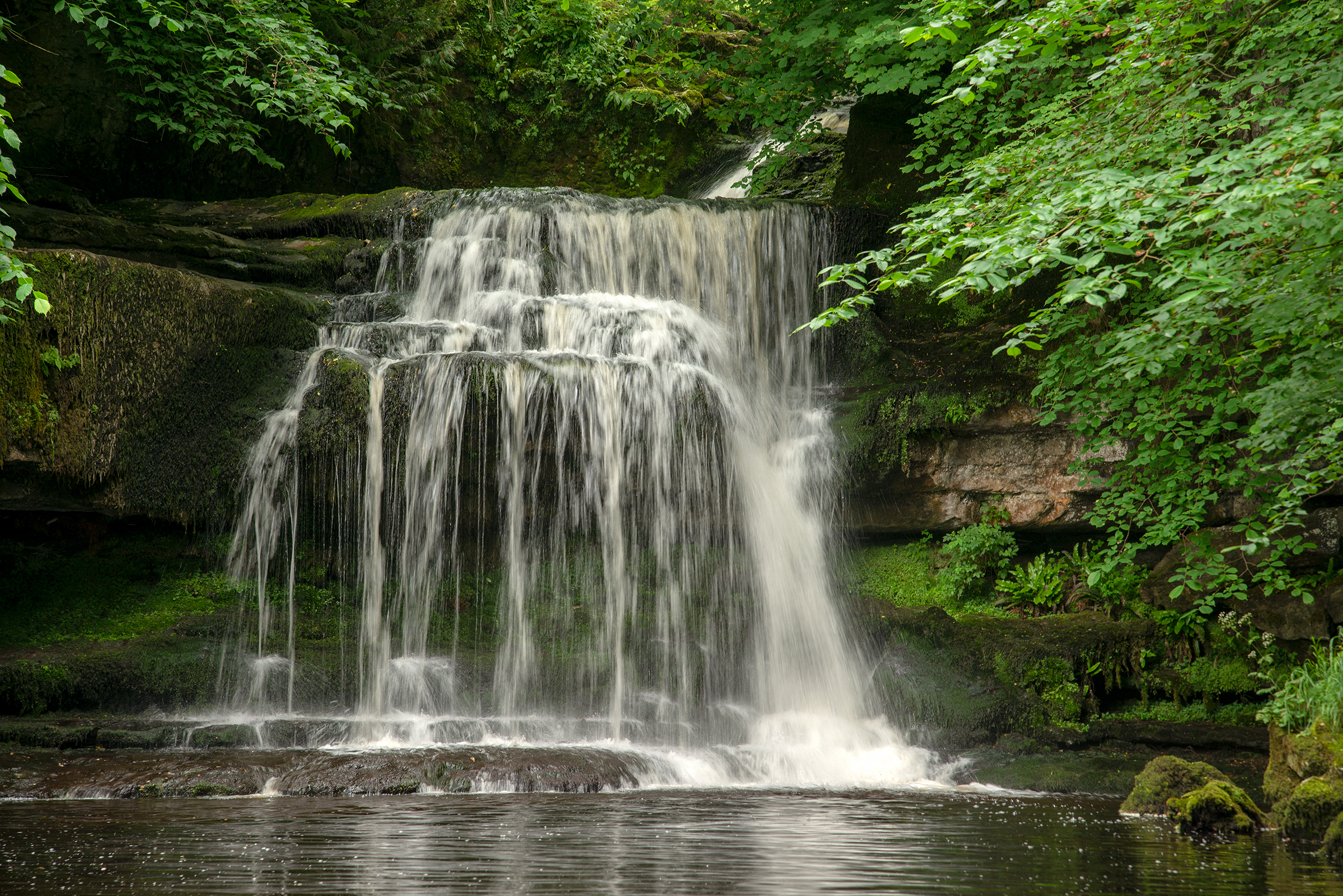
Cauldron Falls in West Burton

Wensleydale's principal settlements are Hawes and Leyburn; Aysgarth, Bainbridge, and Middleham are well-known villages. The shortest river in England, the River Bain, links Semerwater to the River Ure, at Bainbridge, the home to an Ancient Roman fort (part of the Roman road is walkable, up Wether Fell). Hardraw Force, the highest above-ground unbroken waterfall in England, is located at Hardraw, near Hawes.

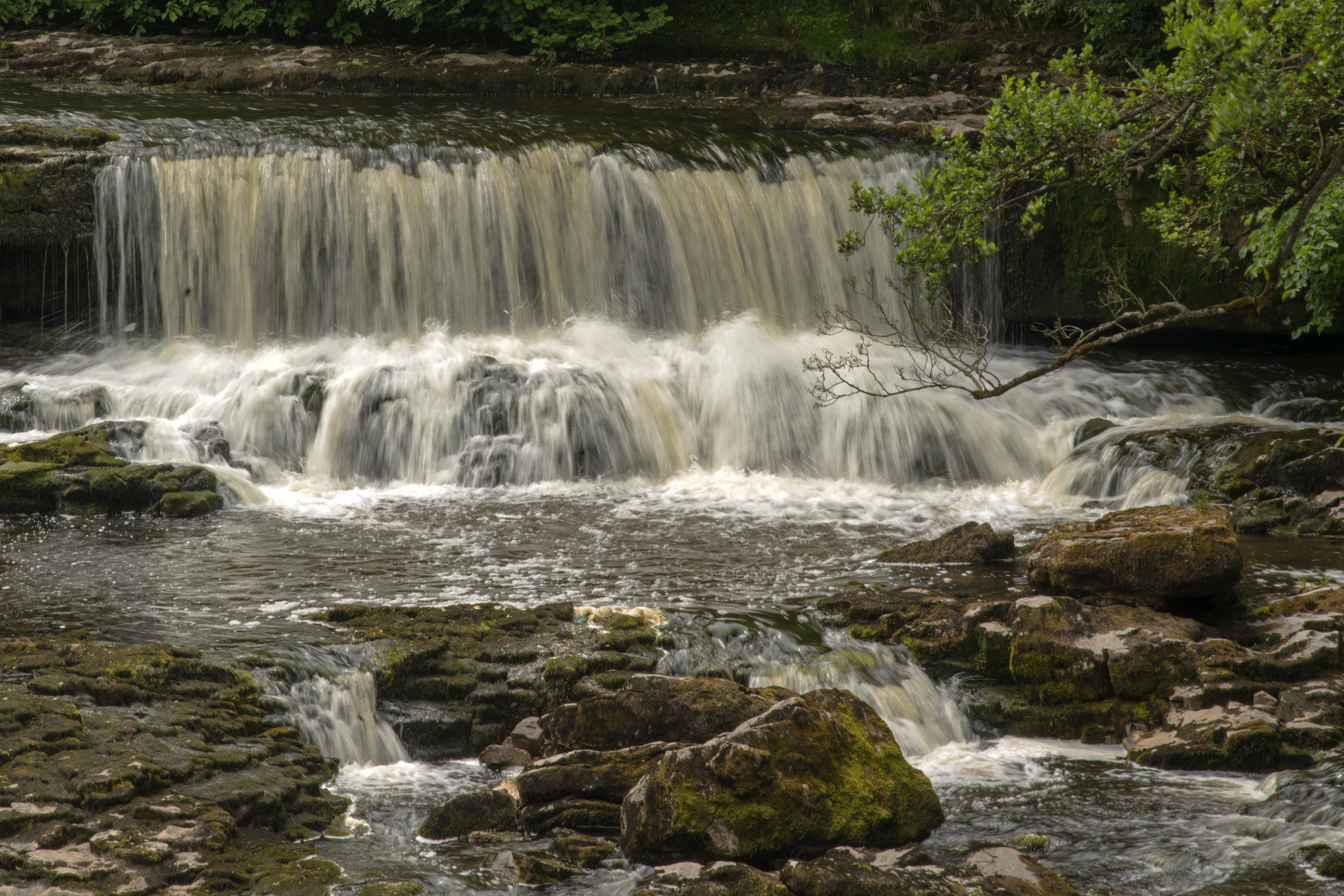
Aysgarth Falls

Aysgarth Falls (High, Middle, Low) are famous for their beauty (rather than their height), attracting far-off visitors; they were also featured in the film Robin Hood: Prince of Thieves. Some scenes from the 1992 film Wuthering Heights were also filmed at the falls. Other notable waterfalls are at Wensley (Harmby Falls), West Burton (Cauldron Falls), and Whitfield Gill Force, near Askrigg.

Wensleydale stretches some 25 miles (40 km) from west to east. It lies between Wharfedale (to the south), and the quieter Swaledale (to the north, via Buttertubs Pass). Several lesser-known dales are branches of Wensleydale: on the north side Cotterdale, Fossdale and Apedale and on the south side, from west to east, Widdale, Sleddale, Raydale, Bishopdale, Waldendale and Coverdale.

Below Wensleydale, the River Ure flows east and south, becomes navigable, changes its name to the River Ouse, passes through York, becomes the Humber Estuary, flows under the Humber Bridge past Hull, Immingham, and Grimsby, and meets the North Sea off Spurn Head. On the way it collects the waters of the River Swale, River Nidd, River Wharfe, River Aire, River Derwent and River Trent.

== Tourism ==
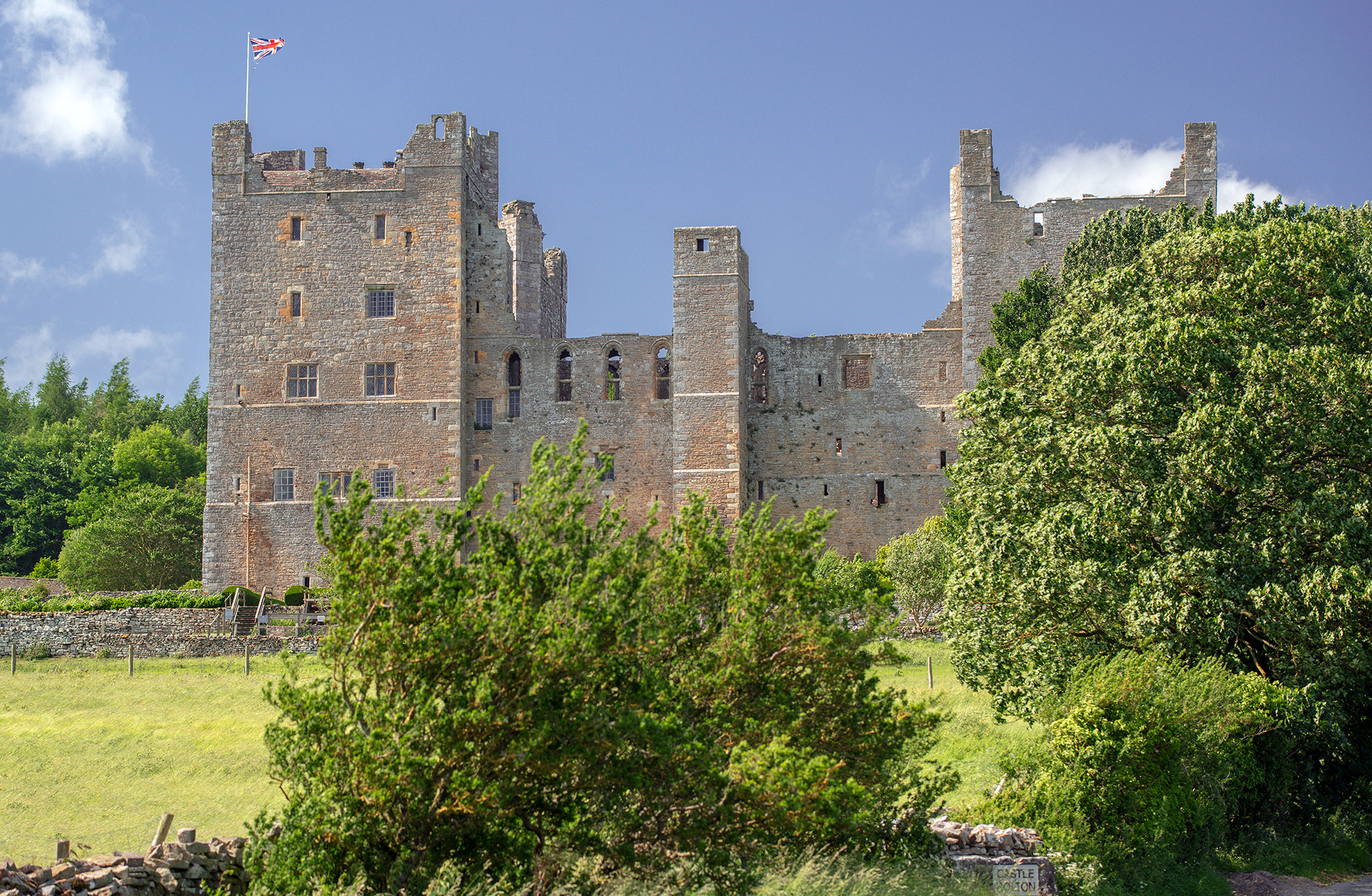
Bolton Castle in June 2018, partially restored

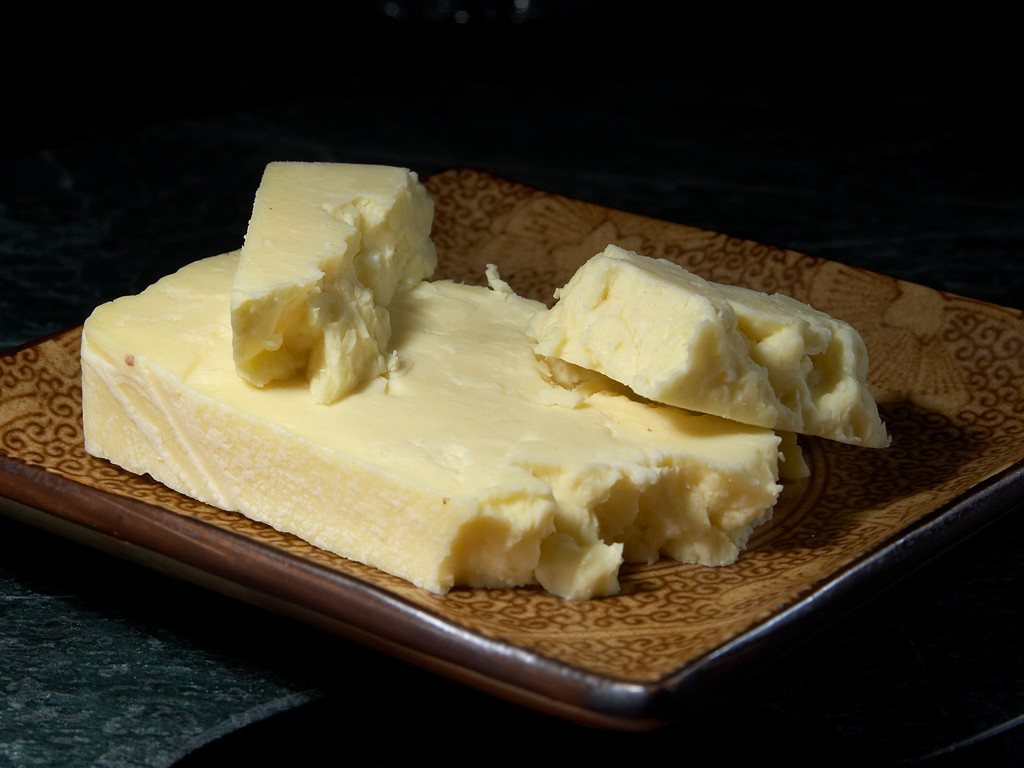
Sample of the Wensleydale cheese

Wensleydale is a popular destination in its own right, enhanced by its central location between two other well-known tourist dales: Wharfedale and the quieter Swaledale.

Wensleydale is a common destination for visitors who like walking on mountains, moorland, dale-sides, and valley bottoms. Hawes and Leyburn are popular because of their age, location and facilities (pubs, shops, tea shops, and hotels). Hawes is the home of rope maker (Outhwaites), where visitors can see the manufacturing process. Hawes is also home to the Wensleydale Creamery, the Dales Countryside Museum, shops and many of places to eat. Part of Bolton Castle is a ruin but the other section has been restored.

The Wensleydale Railway operates in Wensleydale. It currently runs between Leeming Bar, the A1(M) motorway and Redmire, near Castle Bolton. The railway's long-term plan is eventually to run the whole length of the valley and connect again with the National Rail network at both ends: at Garsdale on the Settle-Carlisle Railway in the west and Northallerton on the East Coast Main Line in the east. It is hoped this may help relieve some of the current traffic congestion that the valley suffers from during the busiest months.

Some visitors come to Wensleydale due to its connection with Richard III, who was brought up in Middleham Castle. It has the largest castle keep in the North of England. Middleham itself is a market town with pubs and horse-racing connections (several stables). In the market place stands a stone carving, believed to be a boar's head, signifying where the animal market was during the 15th century as well as representing Richard's personal standard, the white boar.

Each August, visitors and local people gather at the edge of Leyburn for the Wensleydale Agricultural Show.
