= Crummackdale =

Valley in North Yorkshire, England

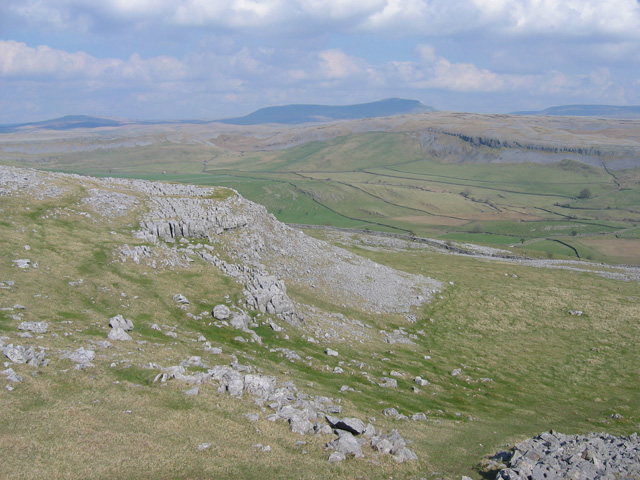
- View from Thwaite over Crummackdale
- Floor elevation: 520 ft (160 m)

Geology
- Type: Glacial
- Age: Ordovician; Silurian

Geography
- Location: North Yorkshire
- Country: England
- Coordinates: 54.141°N 2.343°W
- Traversed by: Dales High Way
- River: Austwick Beck
- Interactive map of Crummackdale

Crummackdale, (sometimes Crummack Dale), is a small valley north of the village of Austwick in the former Craven District of North Yorkshire, England. The Valley is drained by Austwick Beck, which flows into the River Wenning, which in turn heads westwards to empty into the Irish Sea. Crummackdale is a narrow south west facing dale, at the south west corner of the Yorkshire Dales National Park.

== History ==
The valley is "sparsely populated" and runs in a north–south direction with the village of Austwick at the southern valley end. Whilst evidence of human habitation can be dated to the third century, widespread population use did not occur until Anglo-Saxon farmers arrived in the dale c. 7th century, and they partitioned the land, which is still visible with the scarring of the landscape in strip lynchets. These strips were used to grow oats in and around Austwick village. Though Crummackdale has not seen as much human interaction with its landscape as other Yorkshire Dales, its recorded history in documents, extends as far back as 1190, when the landowner, Richard de Morevill, granted some of the fields to Furness Abbey for 300 marks.

Sheep farming dominates the Dale, with some dairy farming occurring on the lower slopes towards Austwick. Austwick Beck used to have what was known locally as a Washdub. The farmers would get together and dam a low-lying section of the beck, so that they could clean the wool whilst still on the sheep before the sheep were sold. The introduction of chemical sheepwashes, ceased this activity. The great scar limestone at the north eastern end of the dale is quarried at Horton lime quarry on the other side of the hill in Ribblesdale.

To the west of Austwick village, along Thwaite Lane towards Clapham, is the site of a former tarn, Thwaite Tarn, which was drained around 1811. Much of the dale is inaccessible to motor vehicles, but there are many paths and green lanes that criss-cross the dale.

The name of the valley derives from Middle English Crumb-oke; a Crooked oak-tree.

== Geology ==
Crummackdale is noted for the presence of silurian gritstone boulders on a plateau at Norber. The boulders are known as the Norber Erratics; erratics being a phrase indicating they are out of place. It is thought that glaciers deposited the blocks on the plateau when they retreated. The Silurian boulders sit atop small carboniferous limestone columns (about 50 centimetres (20 in) in height), which have been progressively worn down by weathering. This has left the boulders looking like they have been 'perched' on small stones. The Norber Erratics were 'swept up' from the valley floor by the glaciers, and deposited some 340 metres (1,120 ft) on the ridge above the valley. Geological studies have shown that a glacier moved south from Ribblesdale into Crummackdale, coercing the Silurian rocks to the upper sides of the valley. The presence of the Norber Erratics has led the dale to be described as "one of the most entrancing of Yorkshire's small dales".

The small valley is bounded on three sides by limestone outcrops. Towards the east, where a narrow gap caused by glaciation affords the space for a road from Austwick to Helwith Bridge, lies Moughton Fell. Ingleborough lies to the north, and Clapdale to the west. The south of the Crummackdale opens out into the valley of the upper reaches of the River Wenning. Moughton (pronounced Moot'n) and Moughton Nab at the north-east of the valley, rises to 1,401 feet (427 m), and leads over into the quarries of Ribblesdale, Horton, Dry Rigg and Arcow. The north eastern edge of Crummackdale, which is underlain by Great Scar Carboniferous limestone, is fringed with a south-facing limestone pavement. The lower part of the valley lies on Ordovician rocks, which have been exposed by weathering. The North Craven Fault runs east west across the valley floor just north of Austwick village, and the valley floor is overlain with a glacial till, which makes the ground slightly acidic.

== Austwick Beck ==
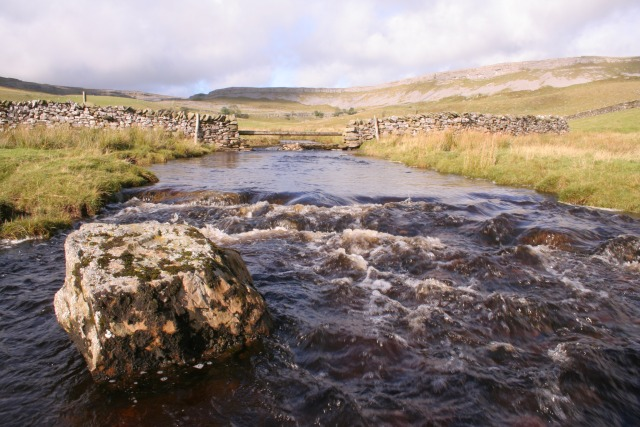
Austwick Beck below the rising

Austwick Beck drains the valley, which stretches for 4.8 miles (7.7 km) before flowing into the River Wenning near Clapham railway station. Two clapper bridges span the river which are listed structures; Flascoe Bridge and Pant Bridge. The beck emerges from a cave near the top of the dale, Austwick Beck Head, but it has been demonstrated that the source of the water is from the limestone plateau above. Water draining from Simon Fell sinks into a number of caves including Long Kin East Cave and Juniper Gulf at the limestone boundary, resurging from Austwick Beck head at the base of the limestone. The cave has been penetrated for 100 metres (330 ft) by cave divers. The water then runs down Crummackdale before disappearing into the ground near to the village of Wharfe, leaving just a trickle of water above ground. However, many springs from both sides of the dale feed water into the beck, and as it meanders past Austwick village and the A65, it joins with Clapham Beck and Kettles Beck to form the River Wenning.

Evidence at Austwick Beck head points to human habitation in and around the second and third centuries. It is thought that the freshwater spring provided the reason for the settlement. The beck remains listed with the Environment Agency as not designated artificial or heavily modified; however, the use of the beck to wash sheep to prepare their fleeces for market, prompted the widening of the beck in the 1780s. This allowed for the water flow to be slowed and to prevent flooding in the washing area.

The beck has a natural population of salmon, brown trout and sea trout in the Austwick area. However, in the 1980s, a programme to encourage salmon spawning further up beck nearer to the hamlet of Wharfe was developed.

== Woodland ==
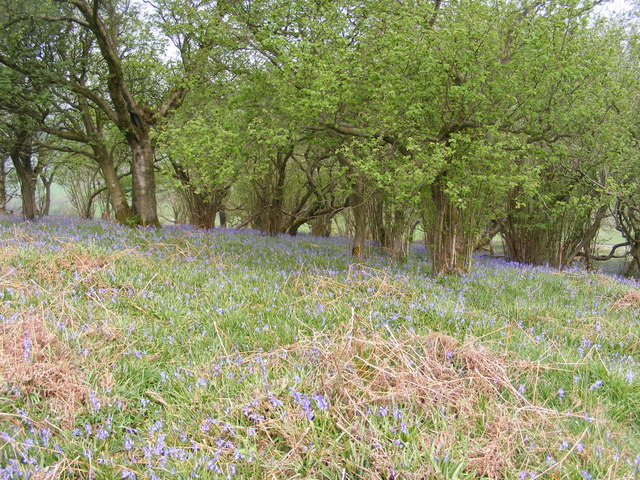
Oxenber Wood

In the east of the valley, lie Feizor Wood, Oxenber Wood, and Wharfe Wood, a combined Site of Special Scientific Interest (Oxenber and Wharfe Woods SSSI). The woodland covers areas where quarrying by local people (mainly from Austwick), has pockmarked the woodland floor. The trees inside the wood are mostly ash, hawthorn and hazel, with dog's mercury and wood sorrel flowering on the woodland floor. The wood sits on a "dome of limestone", covering 89 acres (36 ha) and was originally four separate woods, bordered by Austwick, Wharfe and Feizor, with each wood being named after the nearest settlement, apart from the one closest to Austwick, which was known as Oxenber. At the western edge of the wood is a limestone pavement on which lesser meadow-rue (thalictrum minus), green spleenwort (asplenium viride), northern bedstraw (galium boreale), mountain melick (melica nutans) and bloody crane's-bill (geranium sanguineum) grow. This is notified in the SSSi statement as being of national importance.

The eastern edge of the wood is trailed by the Dales High Way, which heads north through Wharfe and exits Crummackdale westwards past Simons Fell.

== Settlements ==
Some writers maintain that the hamlet of Wharfe is the only settlement in Crummackdale, though Austwick and Feizor are on its southern and eastern sides respectively. All of Crummackdale is within the parish of Austwick, which had a population of 476 at the 2001 census, 463 at the 2011 census, and an estimated population of 440 in 2015.
