= Cowbell (disambiguation) =

Cowbell may refer to:

- Cowbell, a bell worn by freely roaming livestock, making animals easier to locate
- Cowbell (instrument), a percussion instrument

== Popular culture ==
- Cow Belles, Disney Channel movie starring Alyson Michalka and Amanda Michalka
- "More cowbell", a pop-culture phrase made famous in a Saturday Night Live sketch
- Cowbell Man, New York Mets fan Eddie Boison who is a stadium fixture at games
