= Listed buildings in Austwick =

Austwick is a civil parish in the county of North Yorkshire, England. It contains 48 listed buildings that are recorded in the National Heritage List for England. All the listed buildings are designated at Grade II, the lowest of the three grades, which is applied to "buildings of national importance and special interest". The parish contains the village of Austwick, the smaller settlements of Feizor and Wharfe, and the surrounding countryside. Most of the listed buildings are houses, cottages and associated structures, farmhouses and farmbuildings. The others include two clapper bridges and a road bridge, a market cross, a public house, four boundary stones, a hand pump, a church and a telephone kiosk.

== Buildings ==
Name and location	Photograph	Date	Notes
Flascoe Bridge; 54.11306°N 2.34756°W		15th century (reputed)	The bridge carries a footpath over Austwick Beck. It is in the form of a clapper bridge, consisting of limestone and slate flags on stone piers. There are five slabs about 75 centimetres (30 in) wide on four piers, the bridge extending for about 10 metres (33 ft).
Pant Bridge; 54.10849°N 2.35636°W		15th century (reputed)	A pair of bridges joined by a causeway carrying a footpath over Austwick Beck. The bridges are of the clapper type, formed by limestone and slate flags on stone piers. The north bridge has a single slab about 75 centimetres (30 in) wide and 3 metres (9.8 ft) long, on a stone base at each end. The south bridge consists of three slabs on four piers, and it extends for about 4 metres (13 ft).
Market cross base and pillar 54.11114°N 2.35752°W		15th century (probable)	The older part is the base of the cross, it is in gritstone and consists of three steps. The pillar dates from about 1830, it is also in gritstone, in Tuscan style, and is surmounted by a capital and a ball finial.
Austwick Hall; 54.11516°N 2.35477°W		17th century	The house is in stone with shaped eaves modillions and a slate roof. There are two storeys and three bays, the left bay projecting under a hipped roof. In the centre is a Tuscan porch and a doorway with a fanlight, and to its right are the remains of a blocked late 17th-century entrance with a moulded surround. Most of the windows are sashes, there are two small casement windows, and the remains of blocked 17th-century windows in the former third storey.
Beacon Light; 54.12220°N 2.33202°W		17th century	A stone cottage with a stone slate roof, two storeys and three bays. On the front is a gabled porch, its entrance with a basket-arched lintel, above which is a datestone. Most of the windows are replacement casements with chamfered surrounds, the former mullions removed, and with hood moulds. There is also a fixed round-headed light.
Clapham Cottage; 54.10557°N 2.32281°W		17th century	A farmhouse, later a cottage, in stone with a stone slate roof. There are two storeys and two bays. The doorway on the right has a plain surround, and the windows are two-light, double chamfered and mullioned, those in the ground floor with hood moulds.
Feizor House; 54.10564°N 2.32305°W	—	17th century	A farmhouse, later a private house, in stone with a slate roof. There are two storeys and four bays, the right bay projecting. The doorway has a plain surround, and the windows, originally double chamfered and mullioned, have lost some mullions. Most of the windows are casements, and one contains sashes.
Feizor Old Hall; 54.10383°N 2.32338°W		17th century	The farmhouse is in limewashed stone with stone dressings and a stone slate roof. There are two storeys, a front range of three bays, and a four-bay rear wing. On the front is a gabled porch that has an entrance with a moulded surround and a keystone. The windows, most of which were chamfered and mullioned, have been altered, with some mullions removed, and fixed lights or casements inserted. In the right gable end is an entry with a chamfered surround and a decorated, initialled and dated lintel.
Game Cock Inn; 54.11208°N 2.35708°W		17th century	The public house is pebbledashed, with painted stone dressings and a stone slate roof. There are two storeys and four bays, the third bay projecting as an outshut. The windows vary; some have chamfered surrounds, some are mullioned, some mullions have been removed and casements or sashes inserted, and some windows have hood moulds.
Gate Cottage and Hobbs Gate; 54.11339°N 2.35411°W	—	17th century	Four cottages, later combined into two, in stone with a stone slate roof and two storeys. There are two doorways with plain surrounds, and two blocked doorways, one with a segmental pointed lintel. The windows are a mix of casements and sashes.
Stockdale Cottage; 54.10561°N 2.32179°W	—	17th century	The cottage is in stone with a stone slate roof, two storeys and three bays. The central doorway has a plain lintel. The windows have chamfered surrounds, some are mullioned, some have hood moulds, and they contain inserted casements. In the left return is a re-set two-light round-headed window.
Pant Cottage (South); 54.10957°N 2.35808°W	—	Mid to late 17th century	Two cottages combined into one, it is pebbledashed, and has painted stone dressings and a slate roof. There are two storeys and two bays. The windows have been altered; they have chamfered surrounds, most mullions have been removed and sashes inserted.
Battle Hill; 54.11296°N 2.35454°W		1673	A house in limewashed stone with stone dressings and a stone slate roof. There are two storeys and three bays. On the front is a projecting gabled two-storey porch containing an entrance with a moulded surround, a decorated, dated and initialled lintel, and a hood mould. In the angle to the left is a curved stair turret containing a small window with a chamfered surround. The other windows vary; some have a chamfered surround, some have mullions, some have hood moulds, there are fixed lights, and in the upper floor are casement windows.
Ivy Cottage; 54.11152°N 2.35697°W	—	Late 17th century	Two cottages combined into one, it is in stone, with painted stone dressings and a slate roof. There are two storeys and three bays. On the front are paired doorways with plain surrounds, the left one with a shallow hood. The windows vary; some have a moulded surround, some have a chamfer surround, some have mullions and some mullions are missing, and the inserted windows are casements or sashes. In the right gable end is a blind window with a chamfered surround, and there is a decorated head on a projecting corbel.
Moughton Cottage; 54.11178°N 2.35730°W	—	Late 17th century	A stone house with a slate roof, two storeys and two bays, and in the centre is a gabled porch. The ground floor windows have chamfered surrounds, the upper floor windows have plain surrounds, all have two lights and mullions, there is one casement window and the others are sashes.
Old Hall Cottage; 54.10366°N 2.32314°W	—	Late 17th century	A farmhouse in stone with a slate roof, two storeys and three bays. The left entrance has a slate hood, and the right entrance has a chamfered surround and a moulded lintel. The ground floor windows have chamfered surrounds and mullions, some of which have been removed, and hood moulds. In the upper floor are sash windows with plain surrounds. Inside, there is an inglenook fireplace.
Stockdale House; 54.10556°N 2.32269°W		Late 17th century	The house is rendered, with stone dressings, a stone slate roof, two storeys, two bays, and a projecting stair wing at the rear. The central doorway has a plain surround, the windows on the front are mullioned with three lights, and contain casements. In the rear wing is an earlier double-chamfered two-light mullioned window.
Sunny Bank; 54.11092°N 2.35698°W	—	Late 17th century	The house is in stone with a stone slate roof, two storeys and two bays. The windows have been altered; some have chamfered surrounds, some have mullions and some mullions have been removed, there is one fixed light, and the others contain casements.
The Knoll; 54.11063°N 2.35584°W	—	Late 17th century	Two cottages combined into a house, it is in stone with a stone slate roof and two storeys. The doorway has a chamfered surround and a gabled slate hood. The windows are chamfered and mullioned, and contain casements, sashes, or fixed lights. In the upper floor is a re-set copper sundial.
Townhead Farmhouse; 54.11523°N 2.35377°W		Late 17th century	The farmhouse is pebbledashed, with stone dressings and a stone slate roof. There are two storeys and an attic, and a U-shaped plan, with a front range, and two rear wings, that were later filled by an outshut. The central doorway has a moulded surround and a decorated lintel, and above it is a slate sundial. The windows are two-light sashes with mullions. In the centre is a full dormer with three stepped and mullioned lights with a stepped hood mould, in a gable with kneelers.
Townhead House; 54.11469°N 2.35395°W	—	Late 17th to early 18th century	The house is pebbledashed, with stone dressings and a stone slate roof. There are two storeys and three bays. On the front is a gabled porch, and a doorway with a basket-arched lintel and a pendant imitation keystone. The windows are sashes, and the mullions have been removed.
The Cuddy and Garden Cottage; 54.11168°N 2.35811°W	—	1712	A house later divided into two, it is in stone with a stone slate roof. There are two storeys and three bays, and a projecting outshut on the right. In the centre are paired doorways, the left doorway with a moulded surround, a decorated, dated and initialled lintel and a hood mould. The windows are a mix of sashes and casements, and over the ground floor windows is a hood mould.
Town End and Town End Cottages; 54.10973°N 2.36179°W	—	1712	A cottage later divided into two, it is pebbledashed, with stone dressings and a stone slate roof. There are two storeys and four bays. The entrance has a chamfered surround, and a dated and initialled lintel. Many windows have been altered; some have mullions, some mullions have been removed, some have chamfered surrounds, there is a fire window, and most contain casements. To the right is a later, taller two -bay extension.
The Manor House, Wharfe; 54.12260°N 2.33466°W		1715	A stone house with a stone slate roof, two storeys and three bays. The middle bay projects as a two-storey gabled porch, containing a doorway with a chamfered surround and a decorated, dated and initialled lintel, and a slate hood mould. To its left is a small window with a chamfered surround, above is a tall two-light mullioned window, and in the gable are pigeon holes arranged in a triangle. The other windows are double-chamfered and mullioned with hood moulds and contain casements or fixed lights. On the right return is a massive stepped chimney stack.
Harden Cottage; 54.10975°N 2.36063°W	—	1719	The cottage is in stone with a stone slate roof, two storeys and three bays. The entrance has rusticated jambs, the alternate blocks with moulding, a decorated lintel with initials and an imitation pediment, and a hood mould. The entrance is flanked by massive buttresses. The windows in the ground floor are sashes, and in the upper floor are casements with moulded surrounds.
White House Farmhouse; 54.12128°N 2.32713°W		1719	The farmhouse is in whitewashed stone, with stone dressings and a stone slate roof. There are two storeys and five bays. In the centre is a gabled porch, the entrance with a moulded surround, and a decorated, dated and initialled lintel. The windows are double-chamfered and mullioned, and contain casements.
Cheetham Cottage; 54.11173°N 2.35725°W	—	Early 18th century	The cottage is in stone with a slate roof, two storeys and a single bay, the gable end facing the street. On the front is a porch, and in each floor is a two-light chamfered mullioned window containing casements.
Hollin Hill; 54.11078°N 2.35683°W	—	Early 18th century	A cottage in stone with a slate roof, two storeys and a single bay. The doorway on the left, and the windows, which are casements, have plain surrounds.
Leigh House; 54.11280°N 2.35619°W	—	1740s	The house is in stone with a stone slate roof, two storeys and three bays. The central doorway has an eared architrave, a pulvinated frieze containing a five-pointed star, and a shallow hood, and above it is a chamfered blind oculus. The windows in the outer bays have chamfered surrounds, in the ground floor they are sashes, and in the upper floor they are casements.
Austwick Bridge; 54.10979°N 2.35453°W		18th century (probable)	The bridge carries Graystonber Lane over Austwick Beck, and is in stone. It consists of two segmental arches, and has triangular cutwaters, a string course at the base of the parapet, flanking pilasters, and a coped parapet ending in round pillars with caps. On the downstream side are chamfered voussoirs.
Beck House; 54.10892°N 2.35426°W	—	Mid 18th century	The house, which dates mainly from the 1840s, is rendered, with stone dressings, chamfered quoins and a slate roof. There are two storeys, an L-shaped plan with a range of three bays, and a rear wing. The central entrance has a moulded surround, and a basket-arched lintel and a cornice. Most of the windows are sashes, at the rear is a mullioned and transomed stair window, and in the rear wing is a round-headed stair window.
Bridge End and Bridge House; 54.11008°N 2.35519°W	—	Mid 18th century	A house divided into two, it is in stone with shaped eaves modillions and a slate roof. There are two storeys and three bays. On the front is a porch with a segmental-arched leaded roof, and an entrance with a moulded surround and a segmental-arched lintel. Most of the windows are sashes, those in the upper floor with moulded surrounds. At the rear is a segmental-arched stair window.
Harden; 54.10900°N 2.36189°W	—	Mid 18th century	The house is in stone, the upper floor pebbledashed, with a stone slate roof, and a gable with decorated bargeboards. There are two storeys, a U-shaped plan, a front of four bays, and a later gabled extension on the left. The entrance and most of the windows, which are sashes, have moulded surrounds, the windows in the upper floor with hood moulds. In the left bay is a canted bay window, and in the right wing is a re-set datestone.
Huntly House; 54.11203°N 2.35710°W		Mid 18th century	A stone house with a stone slate roof, two storeys and three bays. The entrance has pilasters with capitals, and a basket-arched lintel. The windows have moulded surrounds and mullions, and contain casements or fixed lights. At the extreme left is a later garage entrance.
Suncroft; 54.10844°N 2.35389°W	—	Mid 18th century	The house is pebbledashed, with stone dressings and a slate roof. There are two storeys and two bays. The doorway has a chamfered surround, and the windows are sashes with plain surrounds.
The Traddock; 54.11040°N 2.35606°W	—	Mid to late 18th century	A house, later a hotel, it is rendered, with stone dressings, shaped eaves corbels and a slate roof. There are two storeys and three bays. The central doorway has pilasters and a segmental-arched lintel with an imitation keystone. The windows are mullioned with two lights and contain sashes.
Woodview; 54.11192°N 2.35732°W	—	Mid to late 18th century	A stone house with a stone slate roof, three storeys and three bays. The central doorway has plain jambs and a segmental-arched lintel with a pendant imitation keystone. The windows are mullioned with two lights.
Yew Tree Cottage; 54.11027°N 2.36033°W	—	Late 18th to early 19th century	The cottage is in stone, with a stone slate roof, two storeys and two bays. The central doorway has a plain surround, and a timber hood on timber consoles. The windows are mullioned with three lights, and contain casements.
New Field House; 54.11992°N 2.31514°W		1825	A farmhouse in stone with a stone slate roof, two storeys and two bays. The entrance has jambs on square blocks, projecting impost blocks, a dated and inscribed lintel, and a slate hood. The windows are sashes with plain surrounds.
Boundary stone west of Sunny Bank Farm; 54.11817°N 2.29511°W	—	Early 19th century	The parish boundary stone on the east side of Austwick Road consists of a stone slab about 35 centimetres (14 in) high. The upper surface is angled and inscribed "LAWKLAND".
Boundary stone northwest of Sunny Bank Farm; 54.11724°N 2.29858°W	—	Early 19th century	The parish boundary stone consists of a stone slab about 60 centimetres (24 in) high. The upper surface is angled and inscribed "LAWKLAND".
Boundary stone northwest of Little Sunny Bank Farm; 54.11721°N 2.29843°W	—	Early 19th century	The parish boundary stone consists of a stone slab about 60 centimetres (24 in) high. The upper surface is angled and inscribed "STAINFORTH".
Boundary Stone east-southeast of Far End Barn; 54.11761°N 2.30339°W	—	Early 19th century (probable)	The parish boundary stone on the north side of Austwick Road consists of a stone slab about 1 metre (3 ft 3 in) high and 1 metre (3 ft 3 in) wide with a pointed top. It is inscribed "AUSTWICK LAWKLAND", separated by a groove.
Norcliffe; 54.11273°N 2.35564°W	—	Early 19th century	The house is in stone with a slate roof, two storeys and two bays. The doorway has a plain surround on square bases, and the windows are sashes with plain surrounds.
Pump and water trough 54.10542°N 2.32271°W		Early 19th century	The hand pump is in cast iron, with a fluted cap and spout. The water trough, which is probably earlier, is in stone and is rectangular.
Wharfe House; 54.12254°N 2.33430°W		Early 19th century	A stone house with a stone slate roof, two storeys and two bays. The central doorway has a plain surround, and the windows are sashes, also with plain surrounds.
Epiphany Church; 54.11097°N 2.35774°W		1841	The chancel was added to the church in 1883. It is built in stone with a slate roof, and consists of a nave, a west baptistry and beir house, a chancel with a polygonal apse, and a north vestry. The windows are lancets, on the west gable is a bellcote with a ball finial, and the gabled porch has a Tudor arched entrance.
Telephone kiosk 54.11115°N 2.35789°W		1935	The K6 type telephone kiosk on The Green was designed by Giles Gilbert Scott. Constructed in cast iron with a square plan and a dome, it has three unperforated crowns in the top panels.
