= Austwick Hall =

Manor house in Austwick, North Yorkshire, England

Coordinates: 54.1152°N 2.3546°W

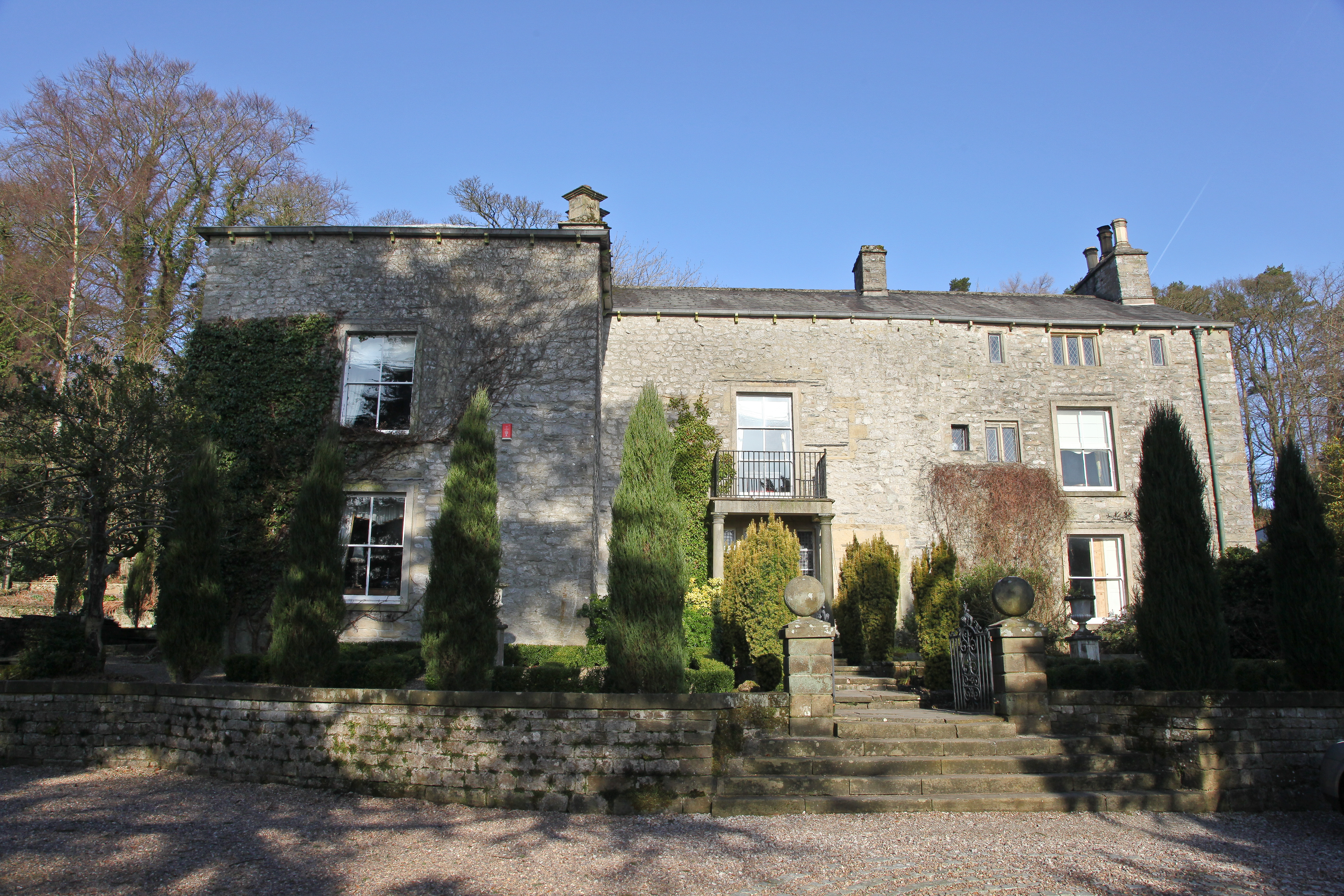
Austwick Hall (2013)

Austwick Hall is an historic manor house situated above the village of Austwick in North Yorkshire, England. The house is a Grade II listed building and contains a collection of furniture, paintings and ethnographic art. The gardens and woodland also contain a collection of contemporary sculptures. Austwick Hall is open to the public from the beginning of April to the end of October and takes guests for bed and breakfast throughout the year.

== History ==
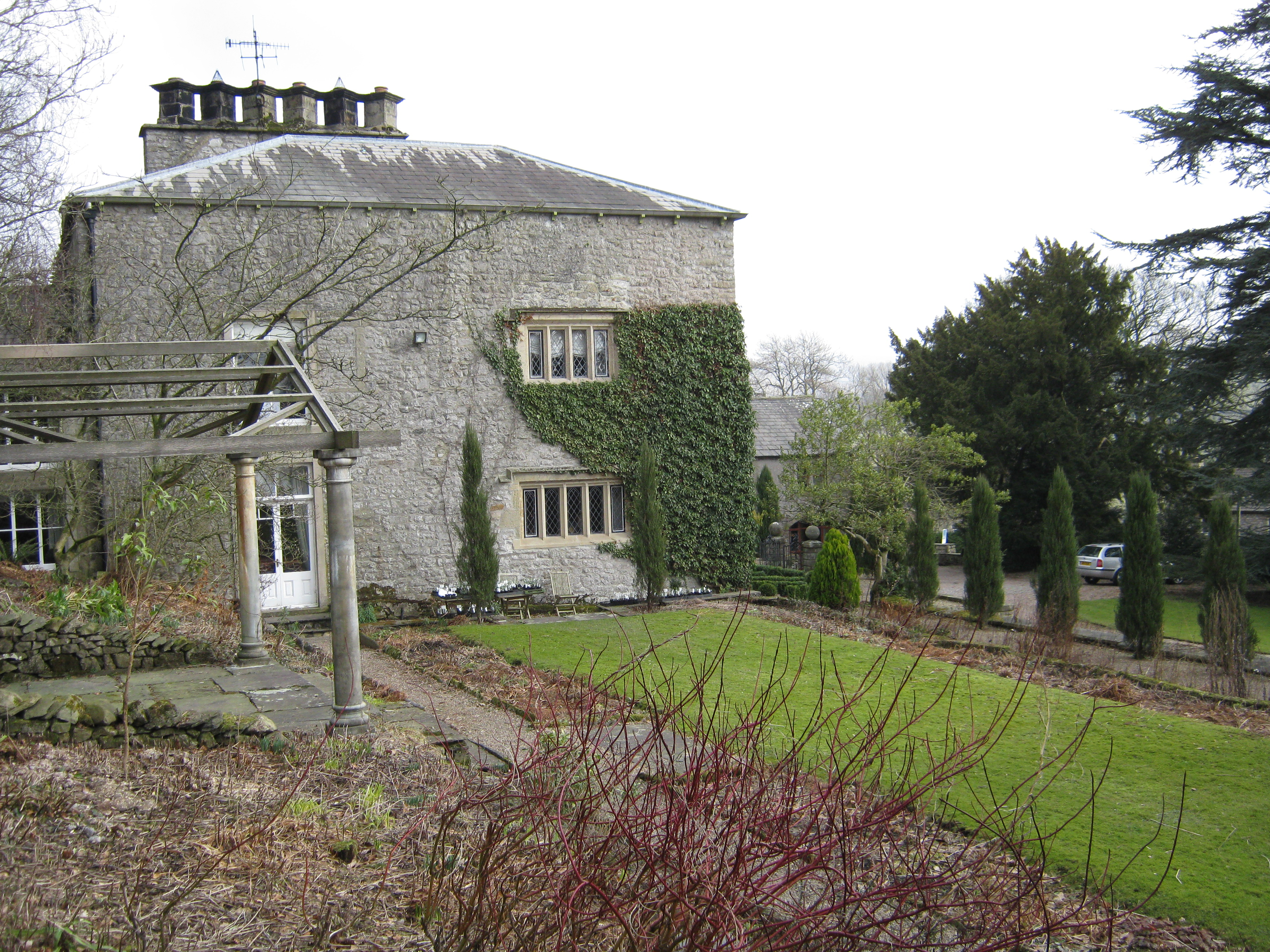
Hall and gardens (2013)

It is claimed by some historians that the hall was originally a pele tower dating from the 12th century. Although the manor is recorded in the Domesday Book of 1086, the first record of the hall is not until 1551, when it was purchased by Sir John Yorke from the Duke of Suffolk. The hall was later sold to John Ingleby, a relative of the Yorke family. It has been suggested that the hall was rebuilt at this point, as three of the fireplaces and west chimney stacks date from the late 16th century. The Ingleby family owned the hall for the next two hundred years. The most notable member of the family was Sir Charles Ingleby. Having trained as a barrister, he was appointed a judge and knighted by James II. In later years he retired to Austwick Hall and was buried in the parish church at Clapham.

In the early 19th century the hall passed to William King, who was responsible for re-modelling the house. The mullioned windows were blocked up and replaced by larger sash-windows, the roof level was raised and the grand central staircase was installed. In 1829 the hall was sold due to the bankruptcy of William King's son, John, and was bought by Thomas Clapham of Giggleswick. The Clapham family lived at Austwick Hall until 1928 and were responsible for planting the woodland and developing the gardens.

== Present house and gardens ==
The present owners moved to the hall in 1999 and have been responsible for developing the house with its art collection. A snowdrop walk has also been created, which contains over 50 different varieties of Galanthus. The woodland also contains a collection of contemporary sculptures in a variety of media.

== See also ==
- Listed buildings in Austwick
