= Oxenber and Wharfe Woods =

Protected area in North Yorkshire, England

Coordinates: 54°6′45″N 2°19′57″W

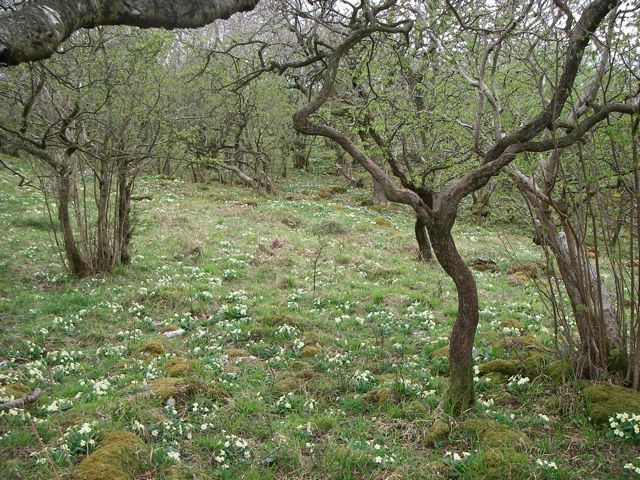
Oxenber Woods

Oxenber and Wharfe Woods is a Site of Special Scientific Interest (SSSI) within Yorkshire Dales National Park in North Yorkshire, England. It is located 550 yards (500 m) north-west of the hamlet of Feizor. This area is protected because of the plant diversity found across the habitats present that include woodland, grassland and limestone pavement. Grazing has led to the woodland being classified as wood-pasture. This protected area comprises three named woodlands: Oxenber Wood, Wharfe Wood and Feizor Wood.

Plant species within the woodland habitats vary between different soil types present in this protected area. On limestone soils, tree species include ash, hazel, hawthorn and rowan; and herbaceous plant species include dog's mercury, wood sorrel, wild thyme, salad burnet and spurge laurel. On acidic soils, tree species include birch and holly and understorey plant species include bilberry, wood anemone and heath bedstraw. Plant species within the limestone pavement include lesser meadow-rue, northern bedstraw and bloody cranes-bill.

Within the northern section of Wharfe Wood there is marsh habitat where plant species include marsh marigold, bog asphodel, marsh arrowgrass and marsh valerian.
