= Cowbell =

Bell worn around the neck of livestock

A Brown Swiss cow grazing with a cowbell

Bells on a herd of cows grazing on Monte Baldo, Italy

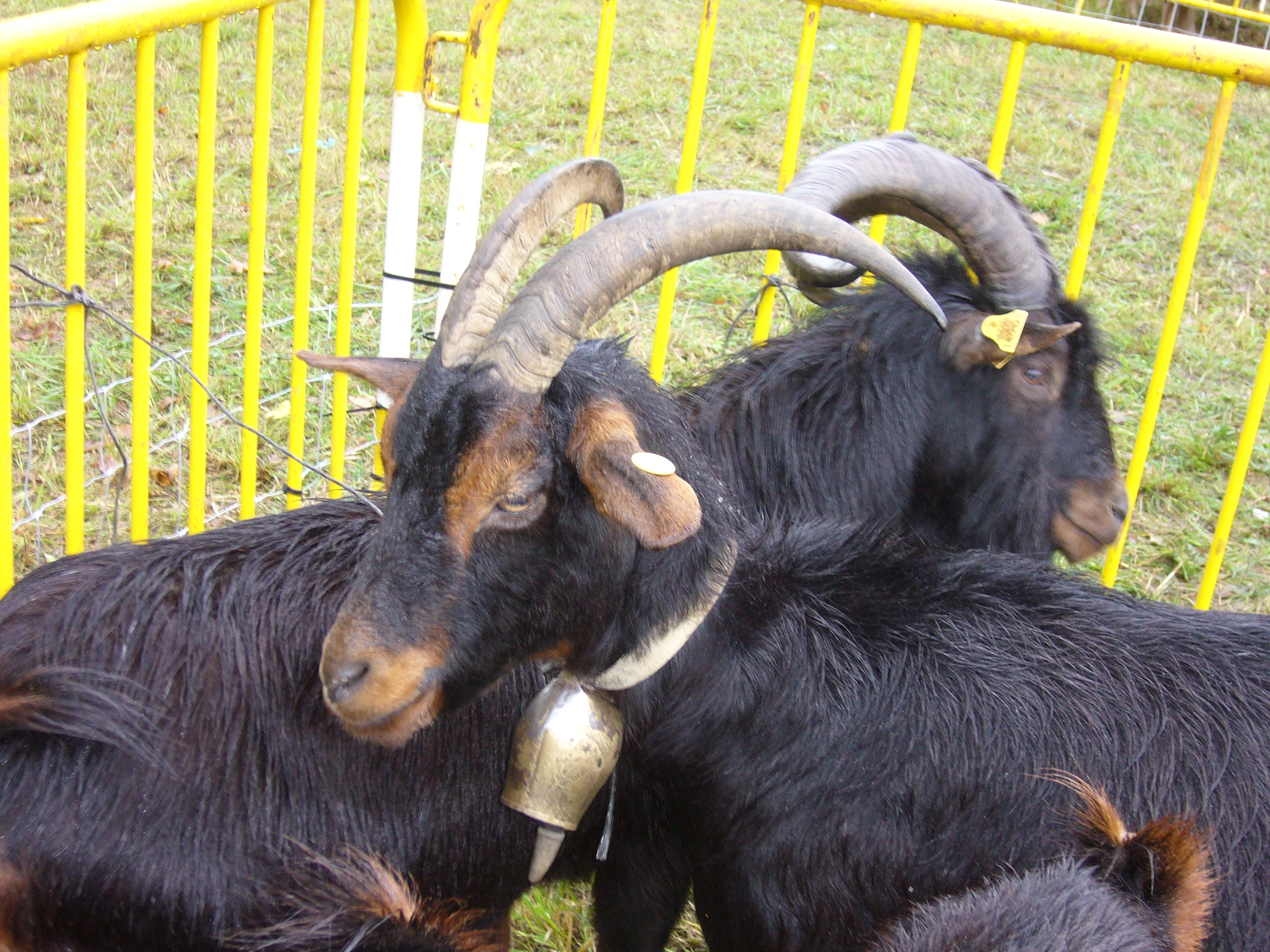
Goat with cowbell

Various types of cowbells from Karnataka, India

Various types of cowbells from the Swiss Alps

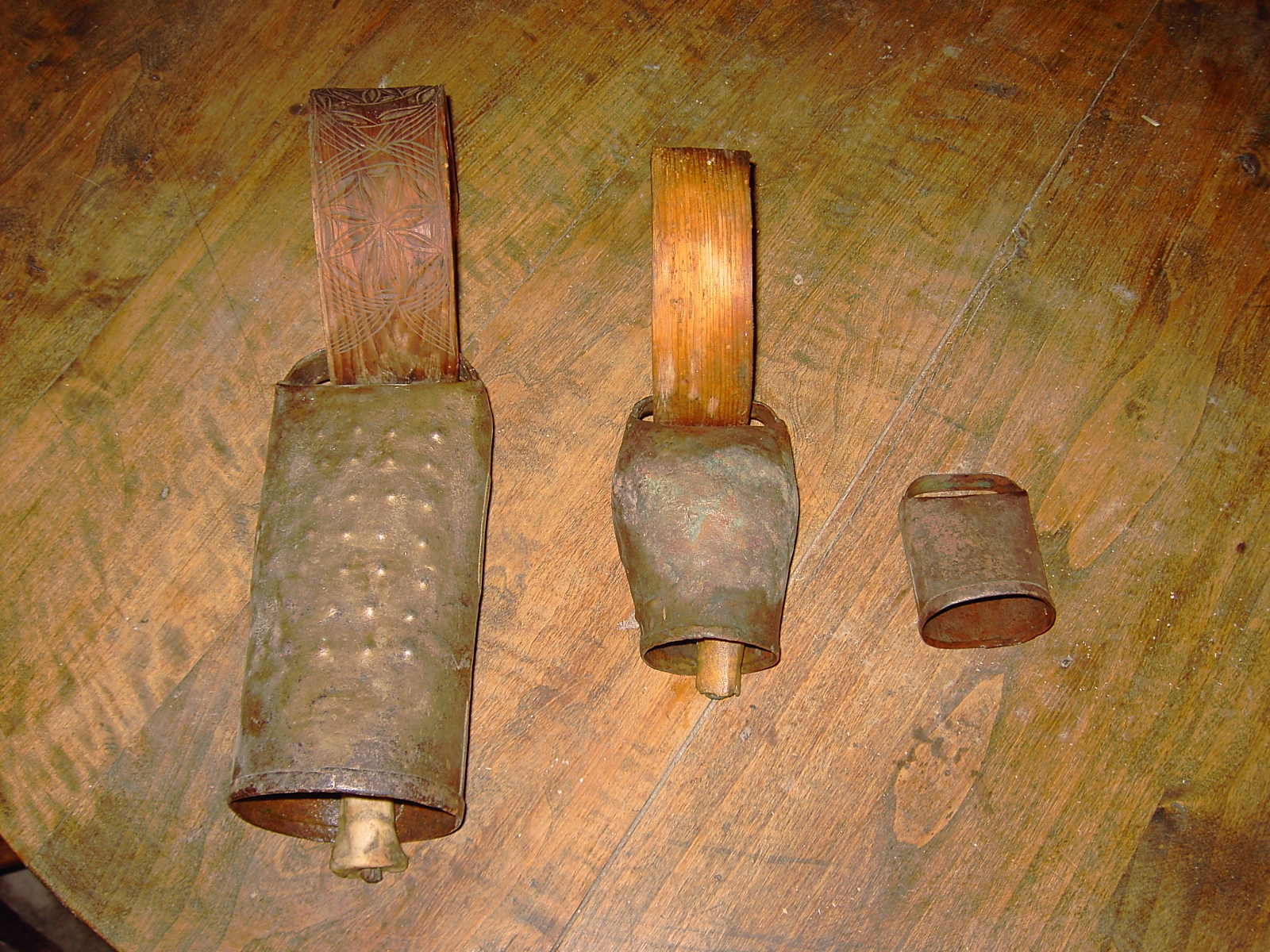
The cowbells are different depending on the species, sex and age of animals. These are used in the Pyrenees area.

A cowbell (or cow bell) is a bell worn around the neck of free-roaming livestock so herders can keep track of an animal via the sound of the bell when the animal is grazing out of view in hilly landscapes or vast plains. Although they are typically referred to as "cow bells" due to their extensive use with cattle, the bells are used on a wide variety of animals.

== Characteristics and uses ==
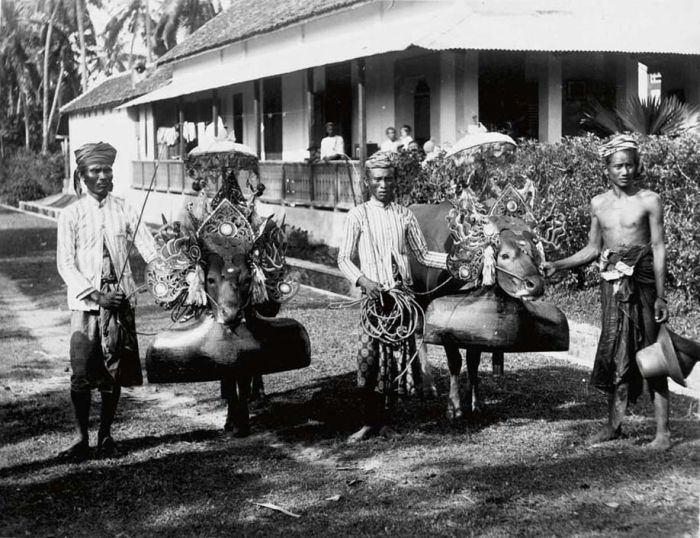
Ancient Southeast Asian cowbells.

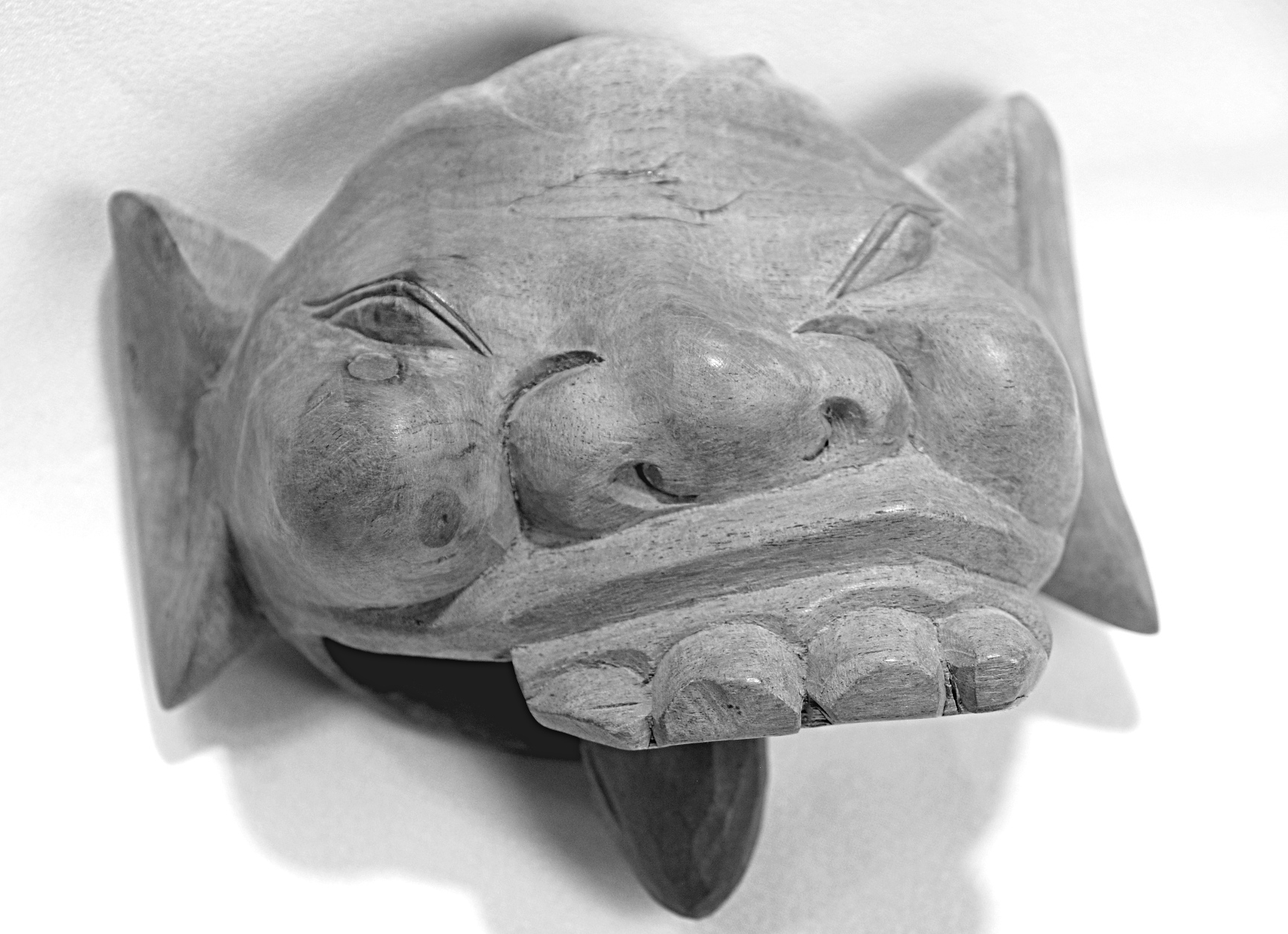
Cowbell made in wood from Indonesia.

The bell and clapper are commonly crafted from iron, bronze, brass, copper, or wood. The collar used to hold the bell is traditionally made with leather and wood fibers. The craftsmanship of cow bells varies by geographic location and culture. Most cow bells are made of thin, flat pieces of plated sheet metal. Plating causes the sheet metal to have a surface which can be decorated or left plain. The ornaments on the cow bell and the collar are usually decorative although some cultures believe that certain ornaments provide or enhance magical protections such as the power to prevent or cure fever and other illnesses. Different bells can have specific sounds to identify important characteristics of the animals, such as age, sex, and species. Some cultures have even developed names to differentiate between bells and their tones; for example, in Spanish, "truco" refers to stud males, "esquila" to female goats or ewes, and "esquileta" for pregnant females and immature animals. Each of these bells possess unique sounds, shapes, and sizes.

Bells are used to keep track of grazing animal herds such as goats, reindeer, sheep and cows. They are mainly used in Europe, Mediterranean areas and Latin America, but are also used worldwide by those who practice transhumance, including nomadic pastoral tribes in Africa and Asia. Some people put bells on their livestock because they believe the foreign sound of the bell scares off predators, however, some studies have shown that the sound of the bell has the opposite effect and leads predators to livestock because predators develop a learned association between the sound of the bell and the presence of a prey animal.

Cowbells are often rung by human spectators at Alpine skiing events, and also, particularly in the US, at cyclo-cross races. They are usually held in the hand rather than worn around the neck.

In the 1960s, Earl W. Terrell and Ralph L. Reeves welded handles onto cowbells at Mississippi State University for students. Today that has led to 60,000 cowbells ringing around Mississippi State Bulldog Athletics. Mississippi State now holds the world record for most cowbells ringing simultaneously.

== History ==
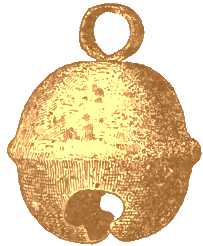
Copper hawk bell, from the Pre-Columbian Mississippian culture in Tennessee (US).

Archaeological evidence of bells dates back to more than 5000 years ago, from the 3rd millennium BC in Neolithic China. During this era, there is evidence of early forms of pottery cowbells, which were likely used to track goats, sheep, and cattle. The pottery bells were later replaced by metal bells. In West Asia, the first bells appeared in 1000 BC. The earliest metal bells, one found in the Taosi site, and four in the Erlitou site, are dated to about 2000 BC.

Bells for shepherding were expanded from the Fertile Crescent to Celtic, Carthaginian, Greek and Roman cultures. The earliest depictions of bells used for livestock in Britain appear on Pictish carved stones of the 7th to 9th centuries AD at Eassie, Angus and Fowlis Wester, Perthshire. Small iron bells of 8th or 9th century date, argued to be for cow or sheep, have been excavated from upland farm settlements at Crummack Dale and Gauber High Pasture in the Yorkshire Dales. An early depiction of a bellwether, the leading sheep of a flock, on whose neck a bell is hung, is in the Carolingian Stuttgart Psalter of the ninth century.

In Europe, the earliest written evidence of bells used for livestock dates to the late 14th to early 15th century. Grimm's Deutsches Wörterbuch s.v. "Kuhschelle" points to a 1410 mention in a Frankfurt archive; the OED lists 1440 as the earliest attestation of a 'bell-wether'. The OED also attributes the phrase "to bear the bell" in the sense "to take the first place" as originally referring to the leading cow or sheep of a drove or flock to Chaucer's Troilus and Criseyde, 1374. In 15th-century Germany, a cow bell was worn only by the best and leading piece of livestock. The wider distribution of the bell worn by livestock was a gradual process of the Early Modern period. In France in the mid-16th century, Francois Rabelais makes this practice explicit in his Gargantua and Pantagruel, stating that

such was the custom, to appear on the field wearing jingling garment, as the high priest wears when entering the sacristy; since the tournaments, that is, the contest of nobility, have been abolished, carters have taken the bells and hung them on their hacks.

— cited after Grimm, s.v. "Schelle"

The importance of the cow bell is highlighted in Swiss folklore, which reflects a period when a great Trychel, or large cow bell, was a rare and much-coveted item. The legend of the Simmental tells how a young cowherd strays inside a mountain, and is offered by a beautiful woman the choice between a treasure of gold coins, a golden Trychel, or the fairy herself. He chooses the Trychel.

As opposed to regular cast-metal bells, 'trychlen' are made of hammered sheet metal. This results in a clanking, less crisp sound, but at the same time results in a bell that is lighter and thus easier to carry.

Modern-day manufacturing of cow bells continues today in Korea, Indonesia, and India, many created as village handicrafts. Despite a May 2012 fire that destroyed its factory, the Bevin Brothers Manufacturing Company continues to make cow bells in East Hampton, CT, as it has since its founding in 1832; it is the only remaining U.S. company making just bells.

=== Examples of cow bells in ceremonial traditions ===
In Western Europe, when the snow has melted in the spring, villages send the cows to the high alpine meadows to graze. This event, called Alpaufzug, is celebrated in each village with a procession through the village to the high pastures. The cows are decorated with floral wreaths woven through the horns. The best milk-producing cow in the village leads the procession and wears the largest bell. The bells are made in various sizes, and are awarded to the cows according to their milk production that year.

In the fall, the event is repeated, but is called an "Alpabzug", as the animals return from the high meadow. The best cows (each referred to as a 'Kranzkuh', "crown[ed] cow", after the ornamental headwear with which it is adorned) from each herd again lead the procession. The traditional festival is called Viehscheid in Southern Germany, and has other names in the Alpine regions.

== Animal welfare concerns ==
Cow bells can be as loud as 113 decibels, and it has been suggested that this may cause pain or deafness in animals wearing them. A study published in 2015 found that wearing a bell over three days caused cows to spend less time feeding, ruminating, and lying down. Animal rights campaigners, including the German Animal Welfare Society, have called for a ban on using cow bells.

== Gallery ==
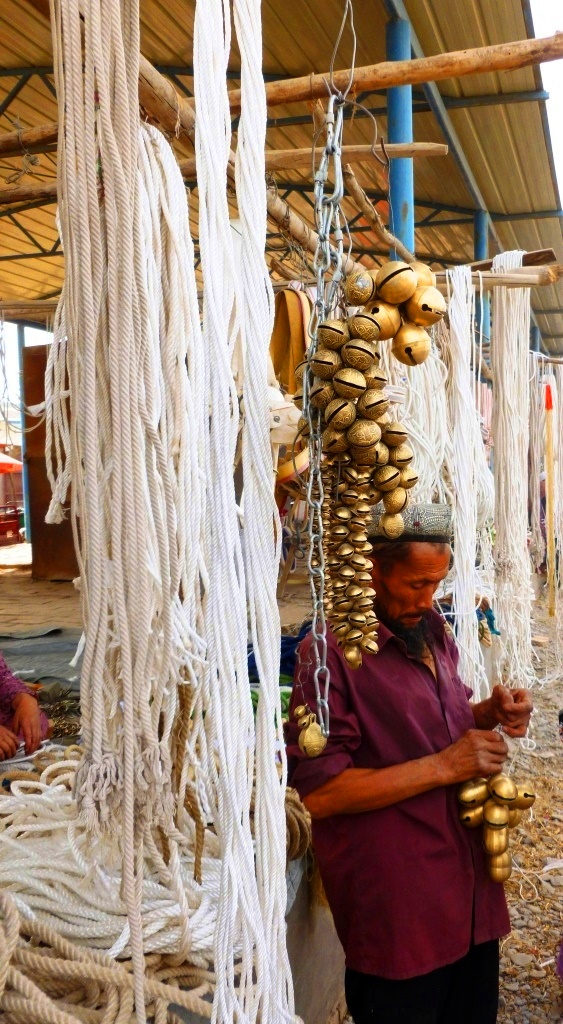
Bells for animals, Kashgar markets

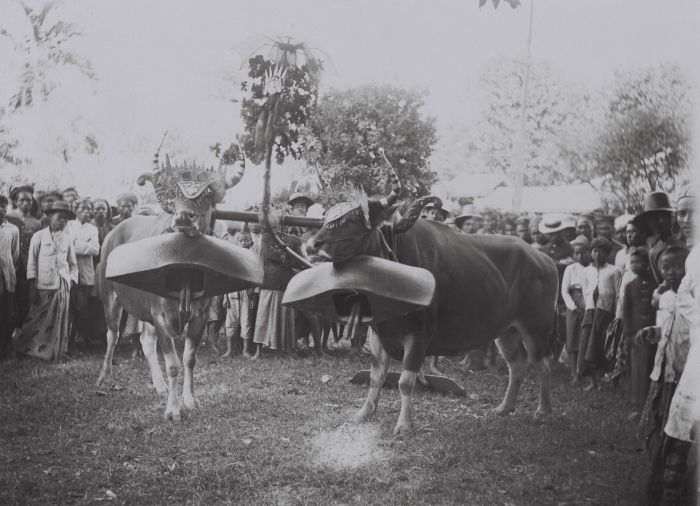
Ancient Madoera festival. Madoera (Madura), Sawah Tengah, Java Oriental, Indonesia

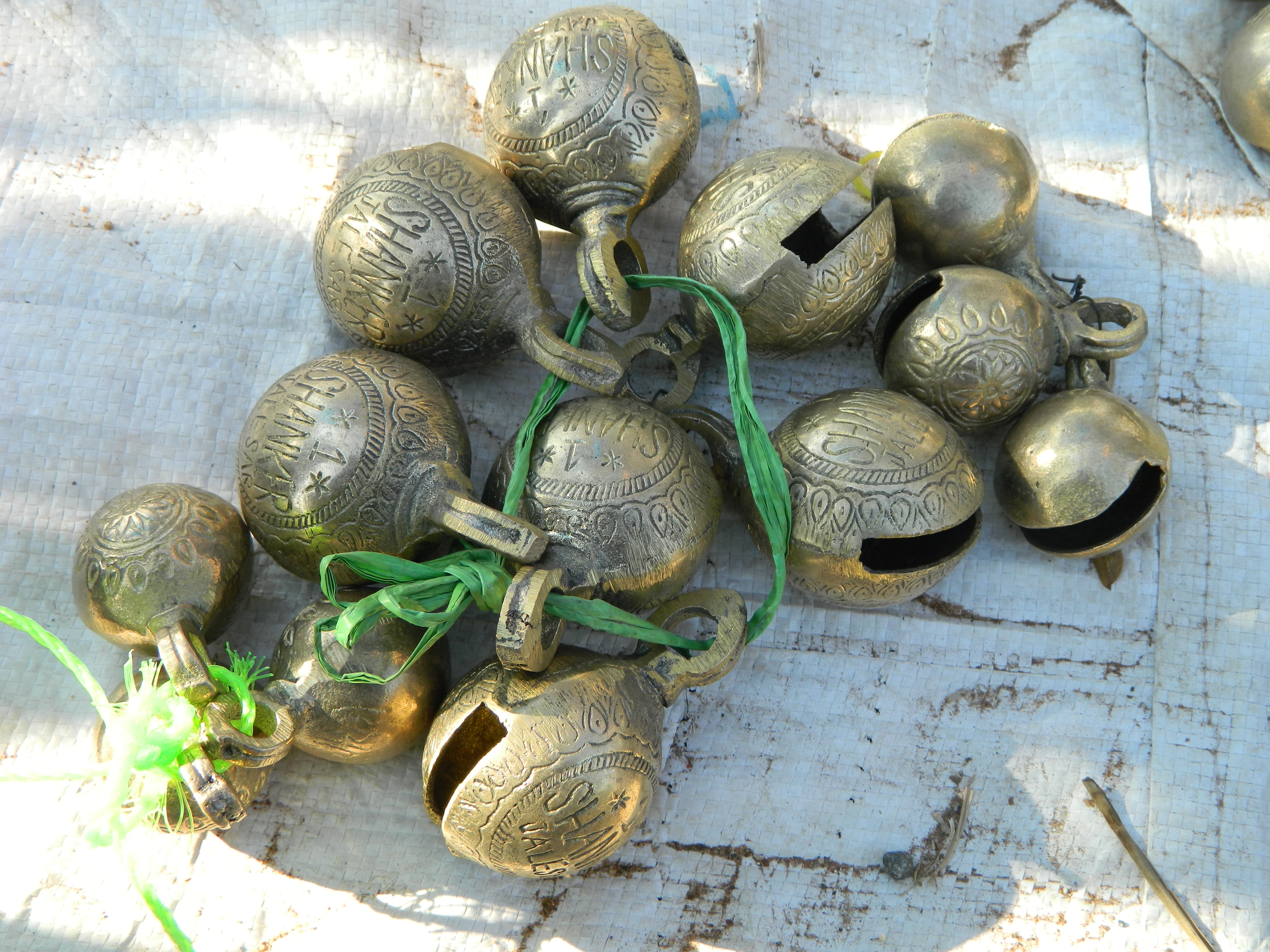
Brass cowbells from Tamil culture in Southern India.

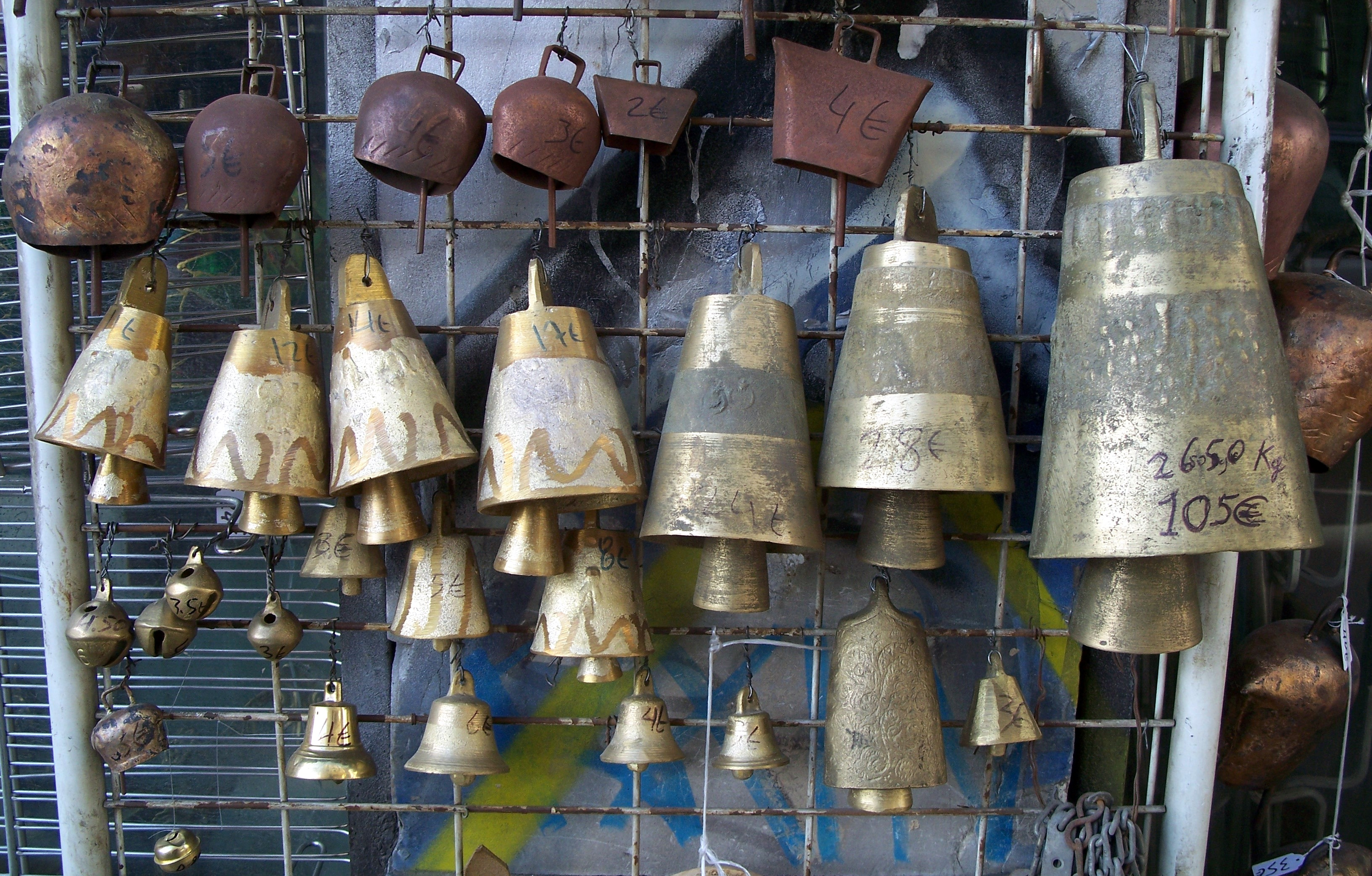
Greek animal bells

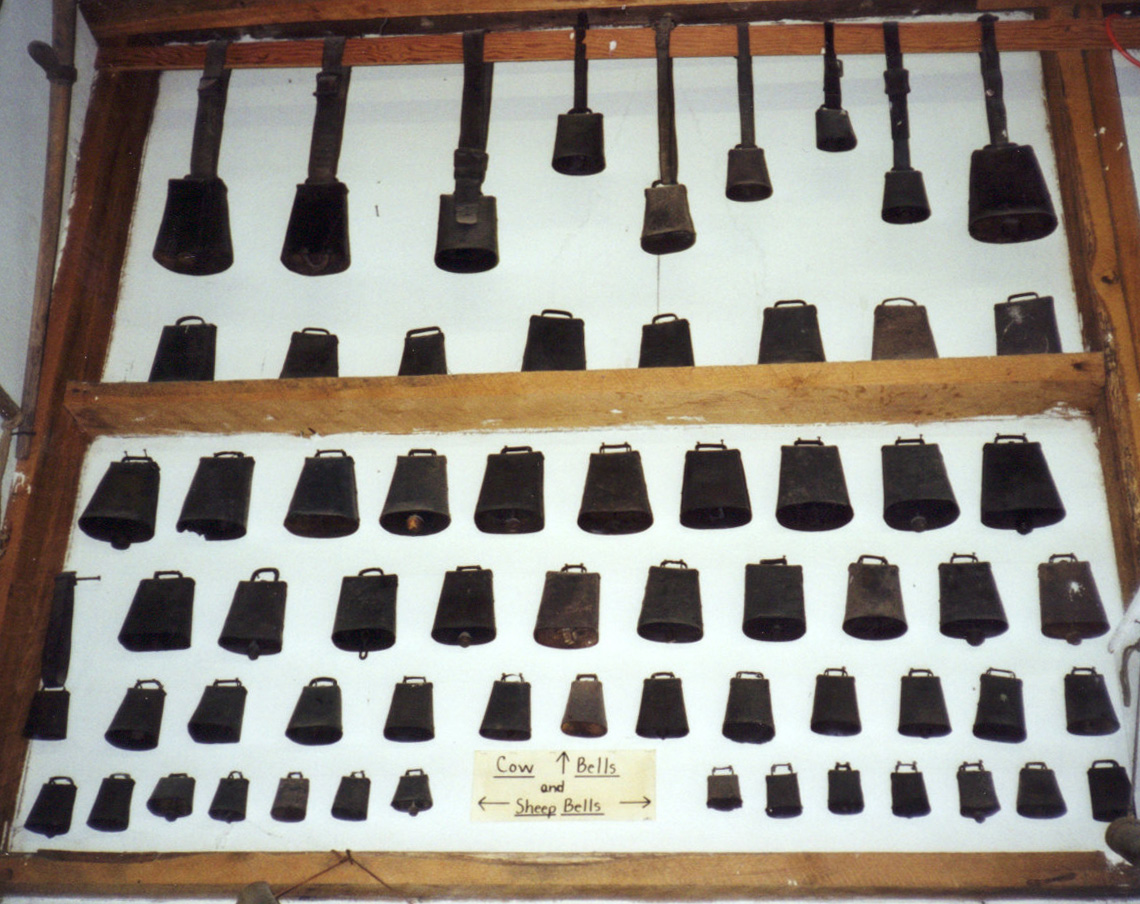
A display of cow bells (and sheep bells in bottom row) formerly used by Appalachian farmers, collected by John Rice Irwin. Photo taken at the Museum of Appalachia in Norris, Tennessee, United States.

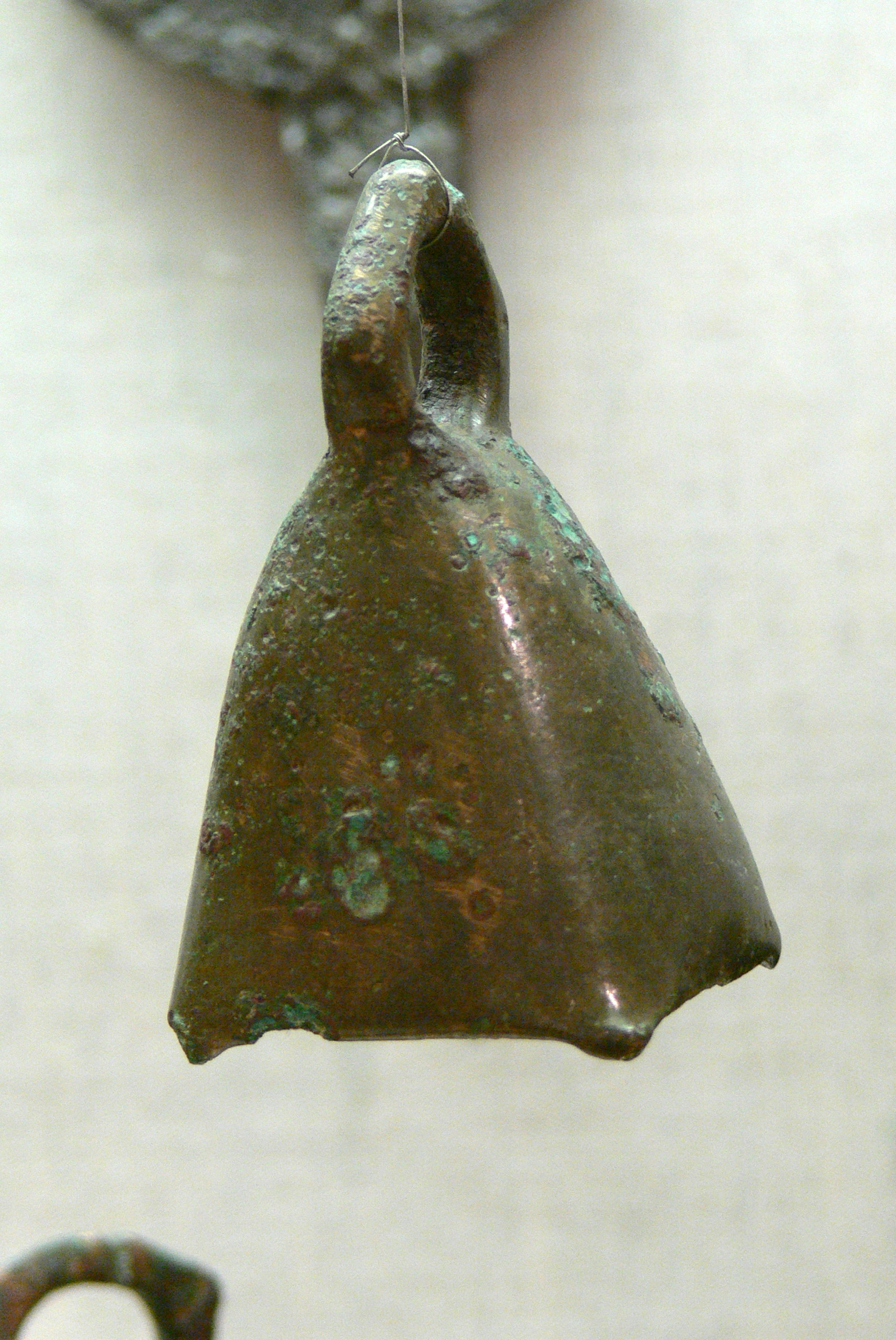
Ancient Roman cowbell in a Bavarian museum, Weißenburg ( Bayern ).

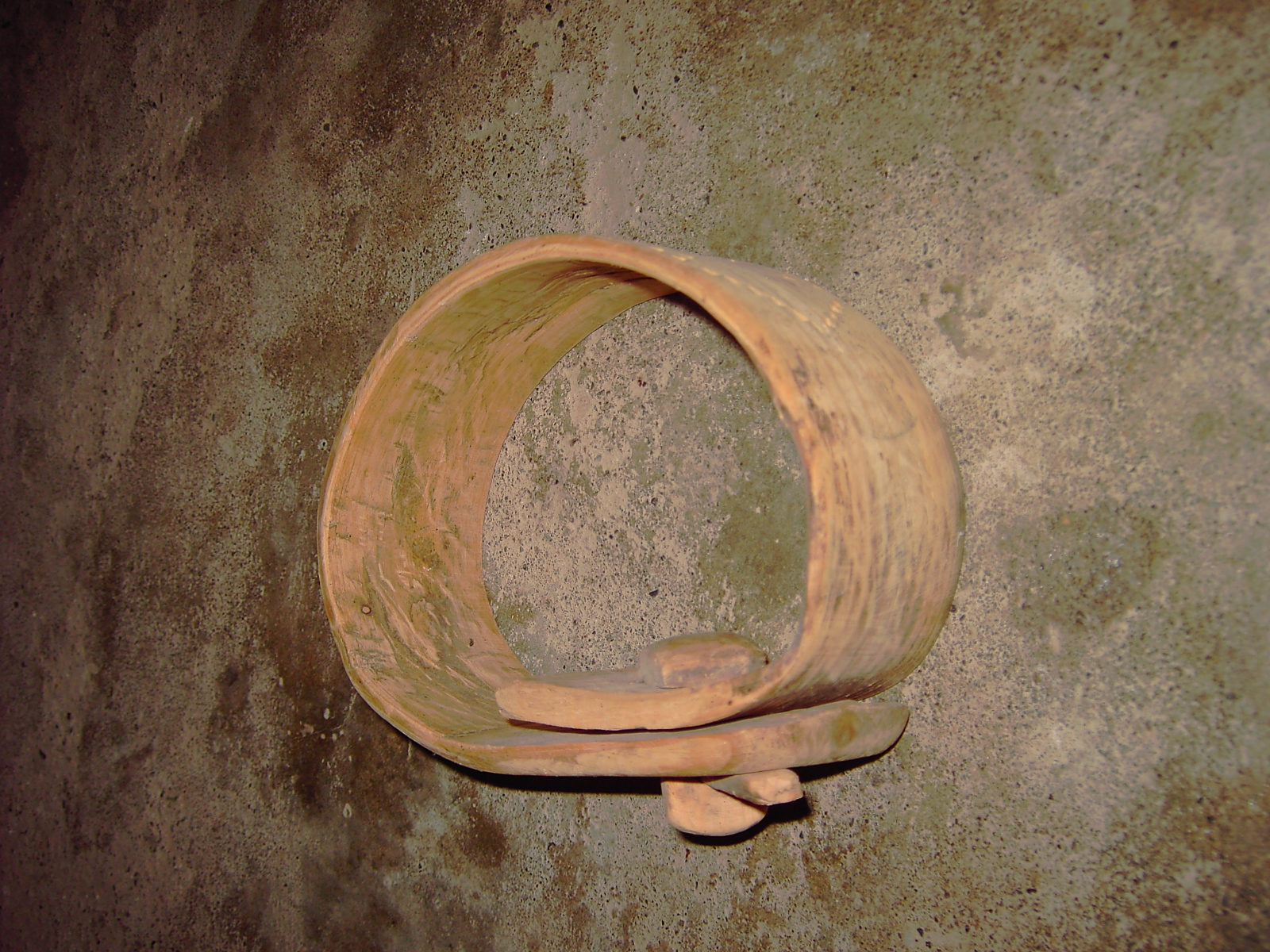
A wood collar for cowbell

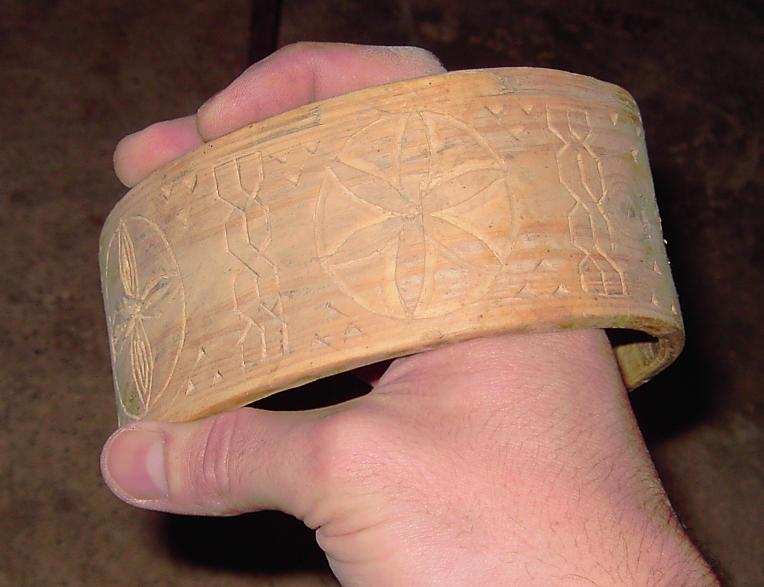
Another wood collar for cowbell with carved symbols.

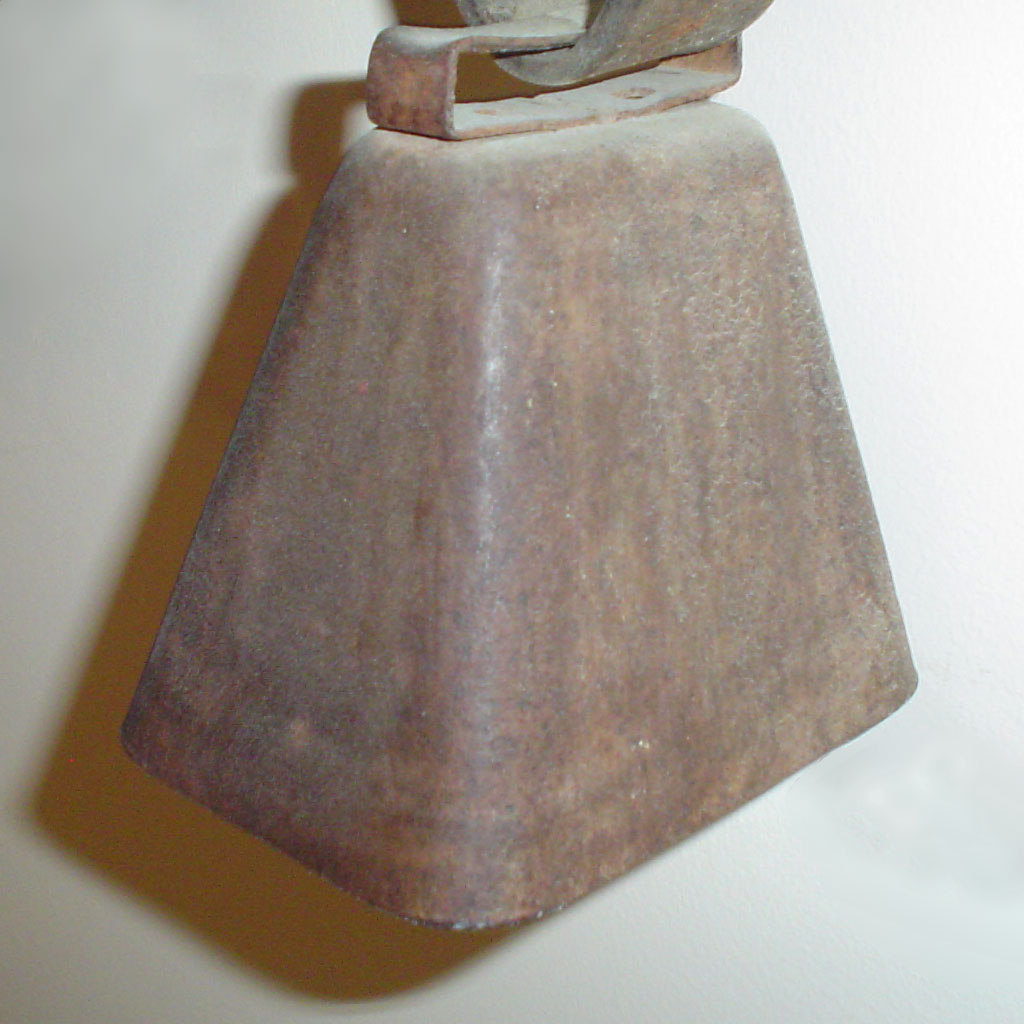
Iron cowbell view 1

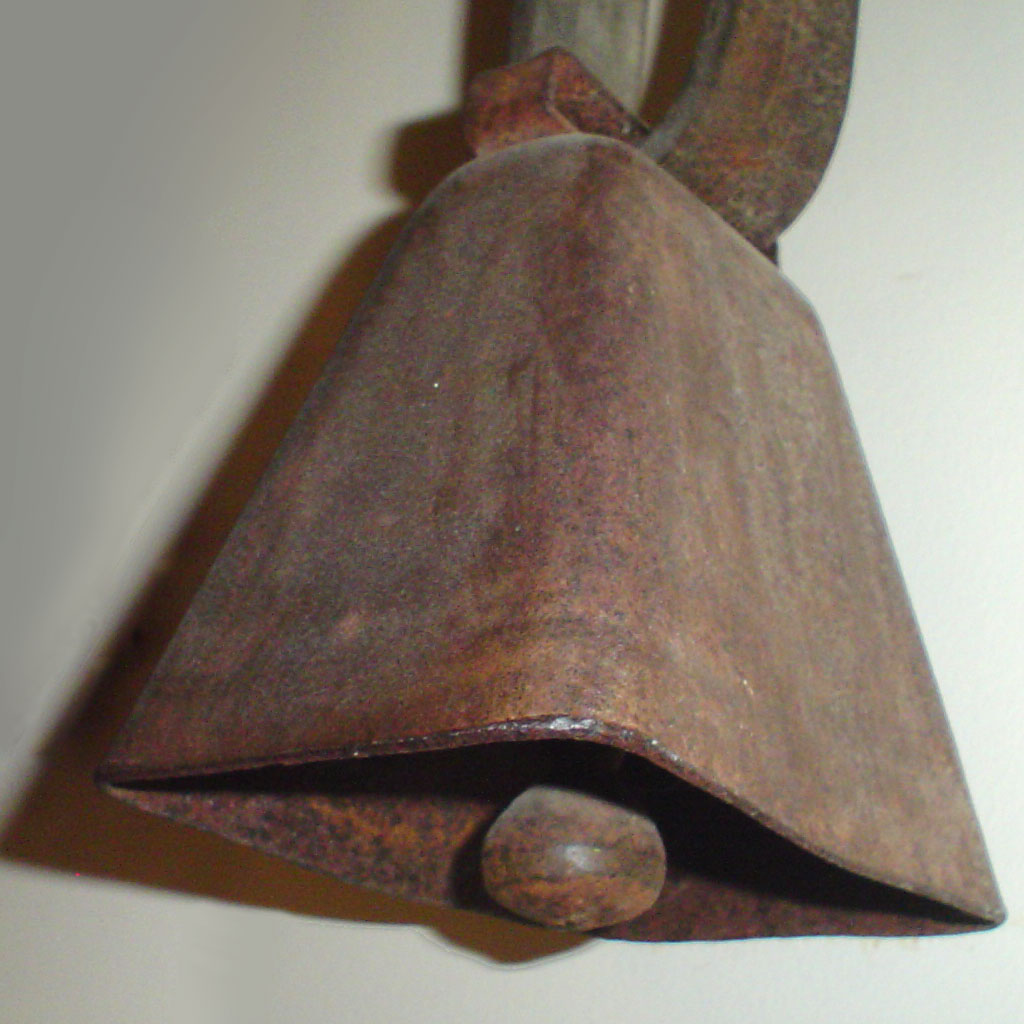
Iron cowbell view 2

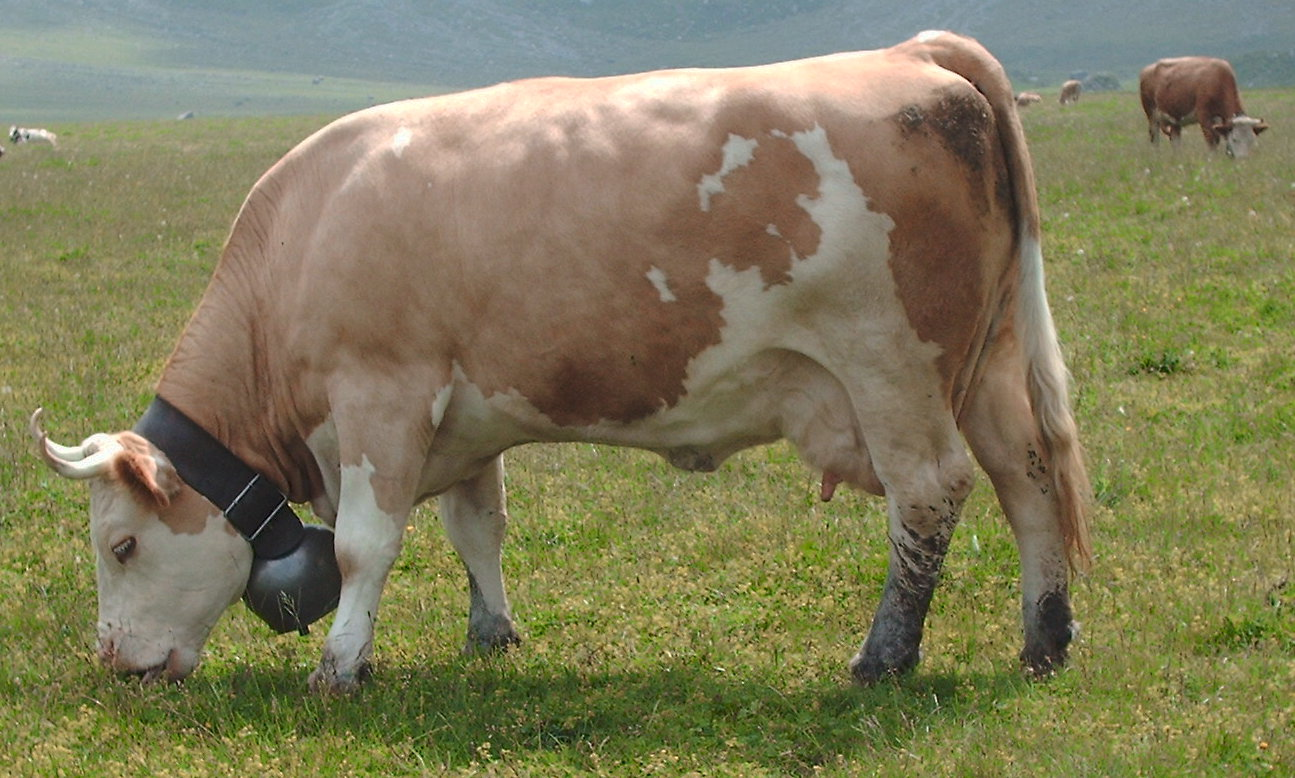
A Simmentaler Fleckvieh cow wearing a 'trychel' cowbell

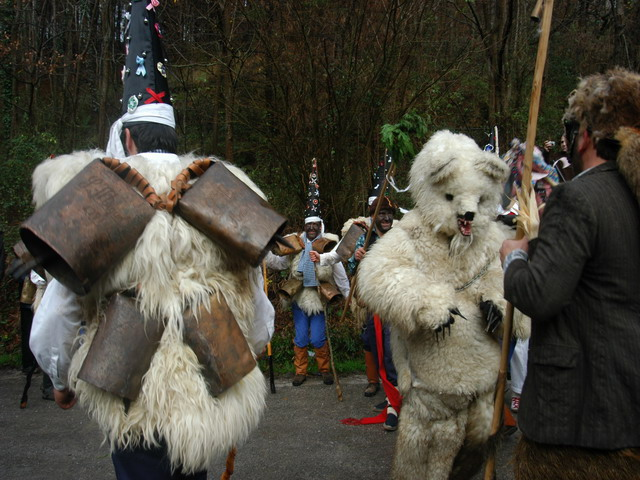
Procession of La Vijanera fiesta (Cantabria).

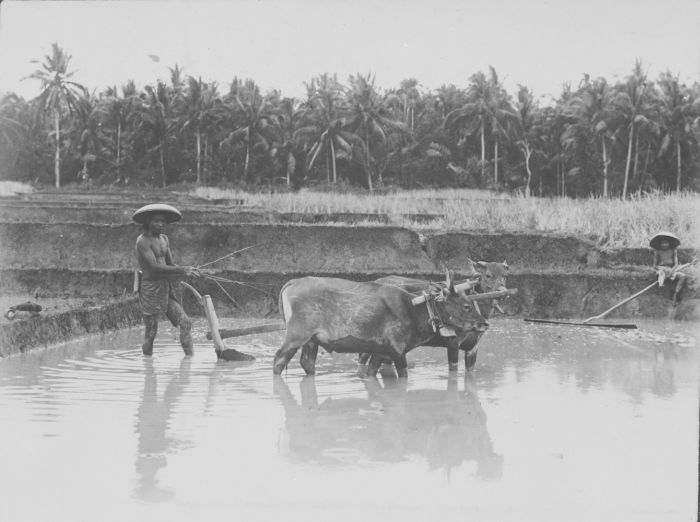
Plowing a rice field with oxen, about 1910-1920 in Sawa (Indonesia).

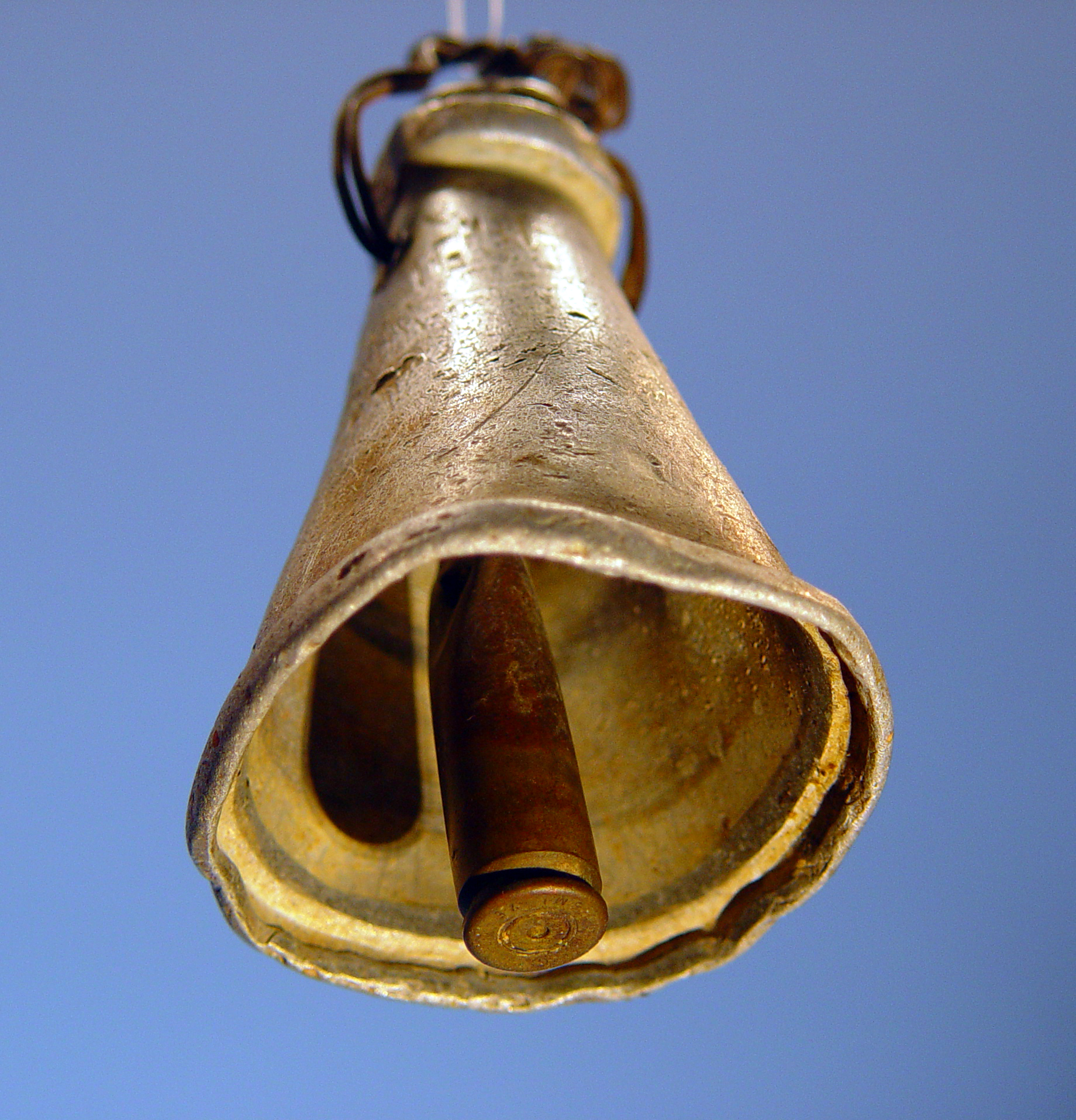
An improvised cowbell used for sheep or goats. The bell was found in 1988 in a field near Tuqu' (Tekoa) in the Judean hills, the West Bank. The bell's body is made of aluminum, probably a broken kitchen utensil, while the clapper is a brass cartridge case.

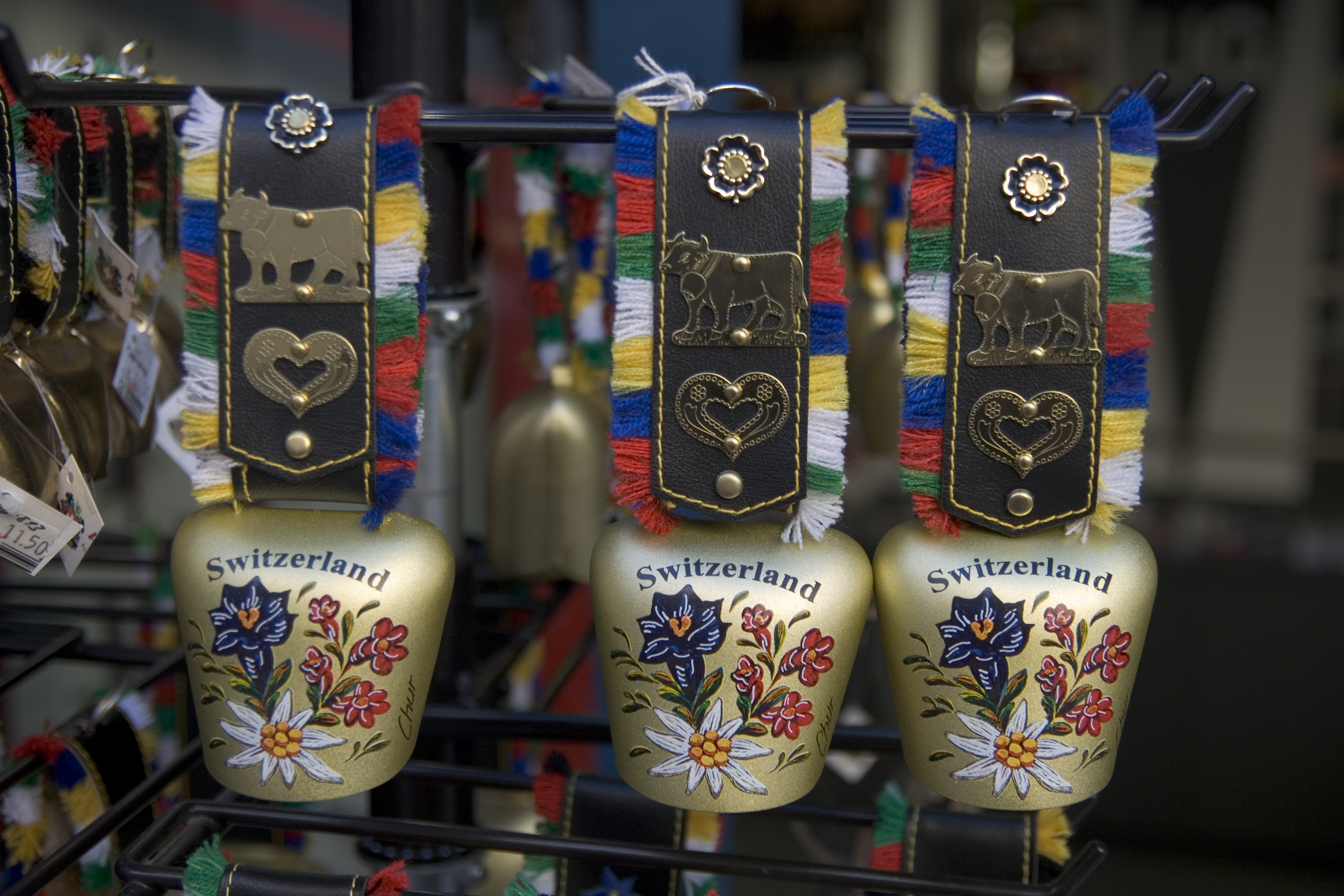
Swiss souvenir cow bells
