= Wharfe, North Yorkshire =

Hamlet in North Yorkshire, England

Coordinates: 54.1227°N 2.3348°W

Wharfe
- Location within North Yorkshire
- OS grid reference: SD78376951
- Civil parish: Austwick
- Unitary authority: North Yorkshire
- Ceremonial county: North Yorkshire
- Region: Yorkshire and the Humber
- Country: England
- Sovereign state: United Kingdom
- Post town: LANCASTER
- Postcode district: LA2
- Dialling code: 015242
- Police: North Yorkshire
- Fire: North Yorkshire
- Ambulance: Yorkshire
- UK Parliament: Skipton and Ripon

Wharfe is a hamlet about a mile north east of the village of Austwick, North Yorkshire, England. Its postcode is LA2 8DQ. The name means 'The bend', The hamlet is the only settlement in Crummackdale, the upper valley of Austwick Beck. Austwick Beck, which runs through Wharfe, flows into the River Wenning which in turn flows into the River Lune. Moughton Fell rises immediately behind the hamlet to a height of 1,400 ft (430 m). The upper plateau of Moughton is contained within 856 acres (3.46 km^{2}) of common land with grazing rights (known as sheep gaits). The hamlet is within the boundary of the Yorkshire Dales National Park and is close to the Norber erratics, a group of boulders moved by glaciers during the last ice age.

There were families with the name of Wharfe dating back to at least the 15th century living in the areas between Malham and Austwick, including the hamlet of Wharfe. In the 1379 poll tax Wharfe appears as querf and qwerf.

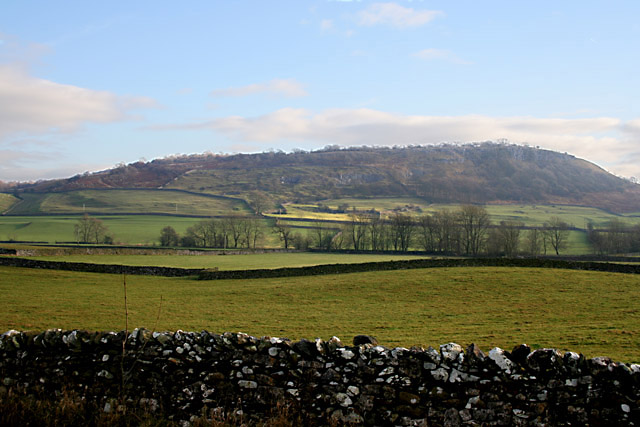
Farmland near Wharfe

In 2014 there are 14 dwellings. 11 are occupied, 2 are holiday homes and 1 is being refurbished. The current permanent population is 30 (21 adults, 9 children) 3 households are pensioner households (4 adults).

In 2009 there were 12 dwellings, of which 10 were currently occupied. The population was 26 (20 adults and 6 children). 3 of the occupied households (6 adults) were pensioner households.

In 1967 there were nine dwellings of which seven were occupied, including three working farms. The population was 16 (10 adults and 6 children). 3 of the occupied households (4 adults) were pensioner households. Of the three working farms, both Wharfe House Farm (94 acres) and Fleet House Farm ceased farming operations in 1967, and Low House Farm (147 acres plus 24 acres (97,000 m^{2}) added since 1967) ceased operations in 2000.

The 1901 census shows that there were 8 dwellings, 7 occupied. There was a population of 37 (21 adults and 16 children).

In 1871 there were 8 households with a population of 35.

The 1841 census shows 11 households, with a population of 36 (29 adults and 7 children) with an average age of 36 years.
