= Charles Ingleby =

Sir Charles Ingleby (fl. 1688, died 1719), was an English barrister and briefly a judge.

Ingleby was a descendant of Sir Thomas Ingleby, judge of the king's bench in the reign of Edward III of England. He was the third son of John Ingleby of Lawkland, Yorkshire. He was admitted a member of Gray's Inn in June 1663, and called to the bar in November 1671. He was a Roman Catholic, and in February 1680 was charged by the informers Robert Bolron and Moubray with complicity in the Gascoigne plot, and was committed to the King's Bench prison, but upon his trial at York in July he was acquitted. Upon the accession of James II he was promoted, and was made a baron of the Irish court of exchequer, 23 April 1686, but, refusing to proceed to Ireland, was made a serjeant-at-law in May of the following year, and on 6 July 1688 was knighted and made a Baron of the Exchequer.

In November, upon the landing of William of Orange, his patent was superseded, and he returned to the bar. His is almost the only case in which a judge has resumed practice. In April 1693 he was fined 40s. at the York assizes for refusing to take the oaths of allegiance to William and Mary. The date of his death is unknown. Thomas Dunham Whitaker, in his 'History of Richmondshire,’ ii. 350, apparently referring to him, but under the wrong name of John, says that he died shortly after the Glorious Revolution at Austwick Hall, and was buried at Clapham, Yorkshire; but the register of Roman Catholic landholders in the West Riding of Yorkshire, 1717–34, is headed by the name of Sir Charles Ingleby, knight, serjeant-at-law.
