= Church of the Epiphany, Austwick =

Church in North Yorkshire, England

Coordinates: 54.11097°N 2.35774°W

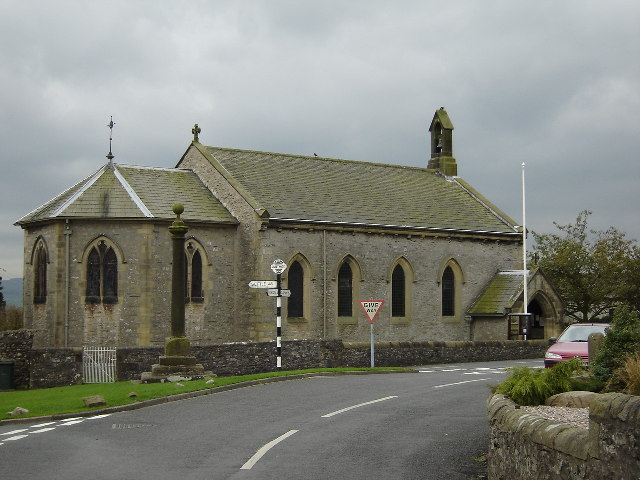
The church in 2004

The Church of the Epiphany is the parish church of Austwick, a village in North Yorkshire, in England.

The church was funded by Charles and E. A. Ingleby, and was constructed between 1839 and 1840. It was consecrated in 1841. A chancel was added in 1883, and stained glass designed by Lavers and Westlake was inserted between 1880 and 1890. The rose window was replaced in 1990. In 2017, the baptistry was converted into a kitchen, and the former bier house was demolished and replaced by toilets. The church was grade II listed in 1988.

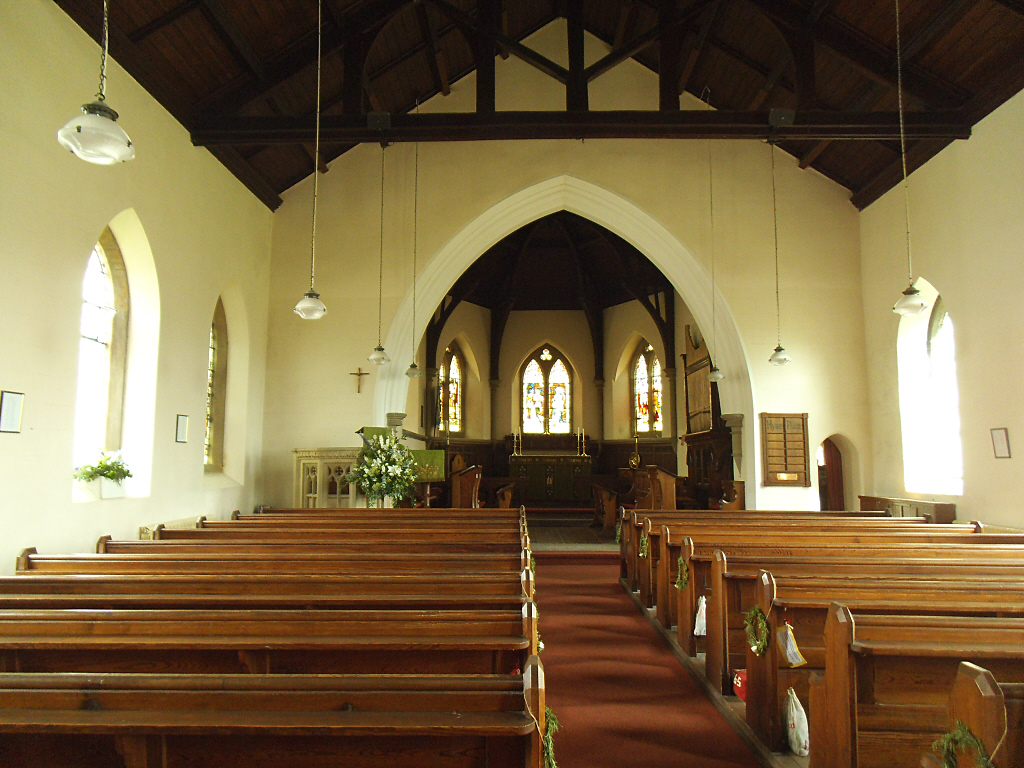
View from the nave into the chancel

The church is built of rubble, with stone dressings, and a slate roof. It consists of a four-bay nave, an apsidal chancel, a western baptistry, a south porch, and a north vestry. The windows are lancets, while the entrance has a Tudor arch. There is a bellcote at the western end, with a ball finial. There is a king post roof. Inside, the pews are made of wood from Lawkland Wood, and some have racks designed for top hats beneath them.

== See also ==
- Listed buildings in Austwick
