= Cow-Bell Man =

American baseball supporter

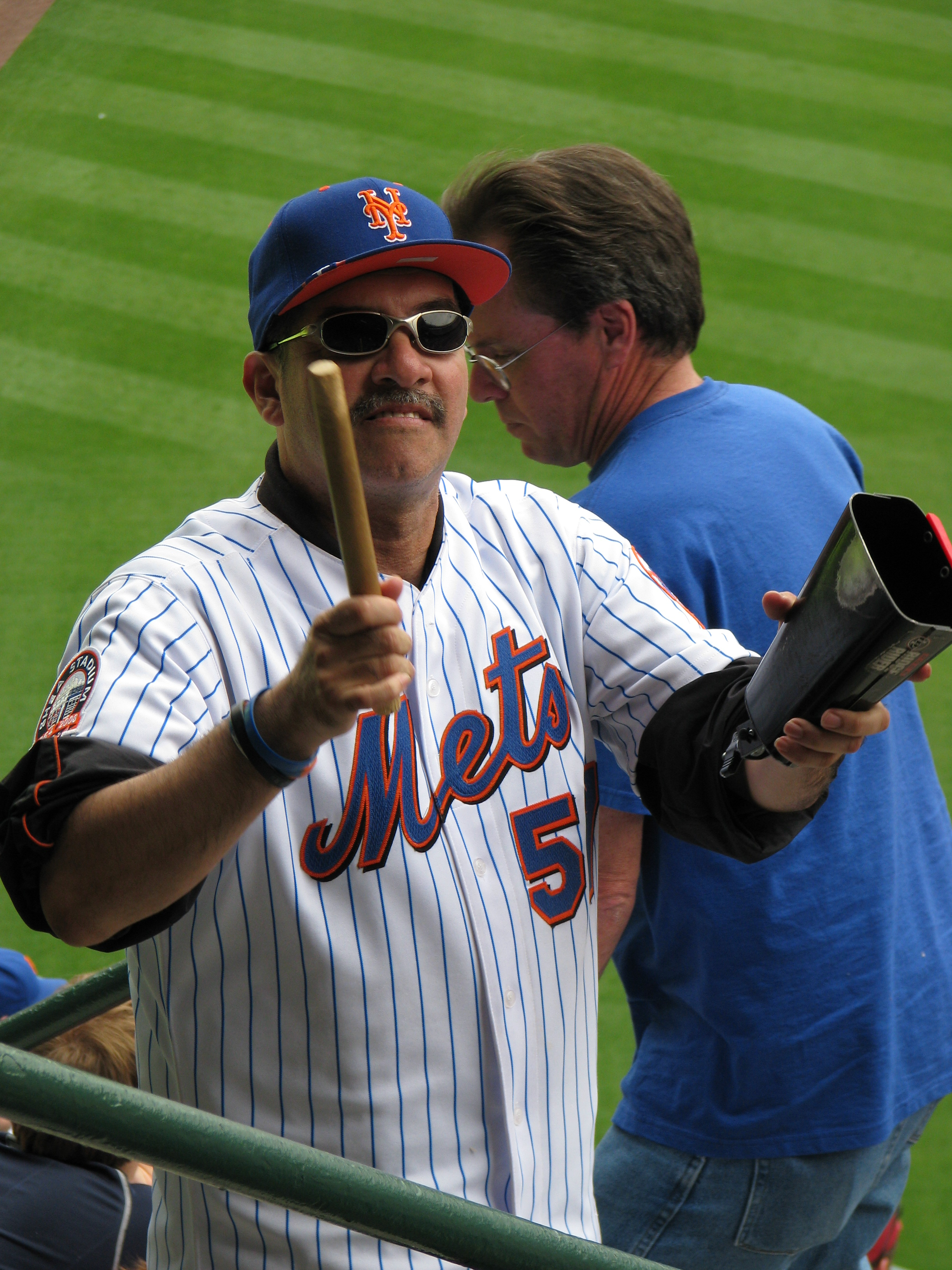
Cowbell Man

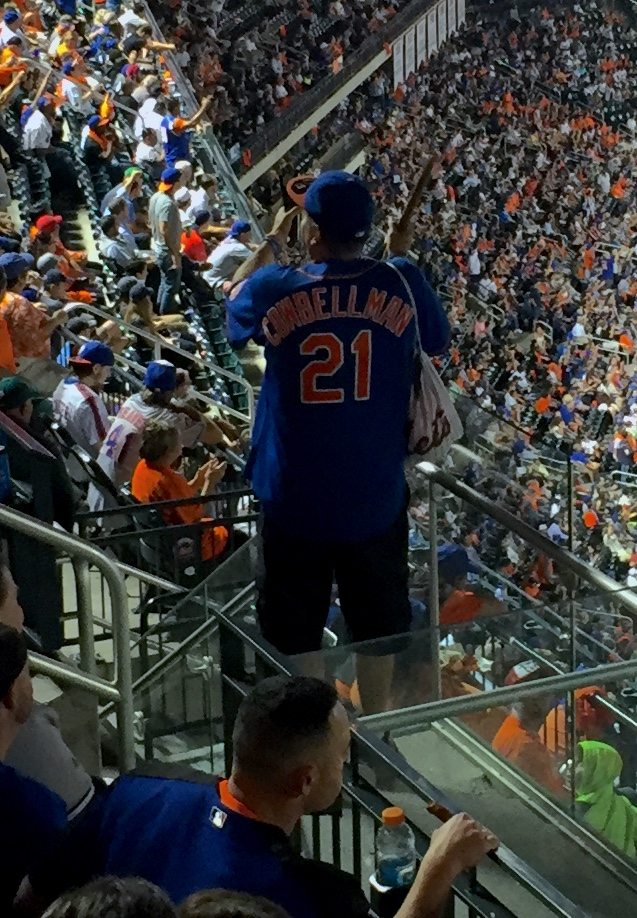
Cowbell Man in 2015

Edwin "Eddie" Boison, known as Cow-Bell Man, is a stadium fixture for the New York Mets. He can be seen at nearly every home game at Citi Field, wandering around the concourses while banging a cowbell. He typically wears personalized jerseys with the sobriquet Cowbellman. In 2009, he wore a batting practice jersey with the number 15, which from 2005 to 2011 was assigned to outfielder Carlos Beltrán. Prior to the Mets' acquisition of Beltran, Cow-Bell Man's jersey featured the number 10, worn by Endy Chavez. Cow-Bell Man is usually seen strolling around Citi-Field interacting with the fans. As of July 2021, Cow-Bell Man wears a Met jersey with "COWBELLMAN" with the #40.

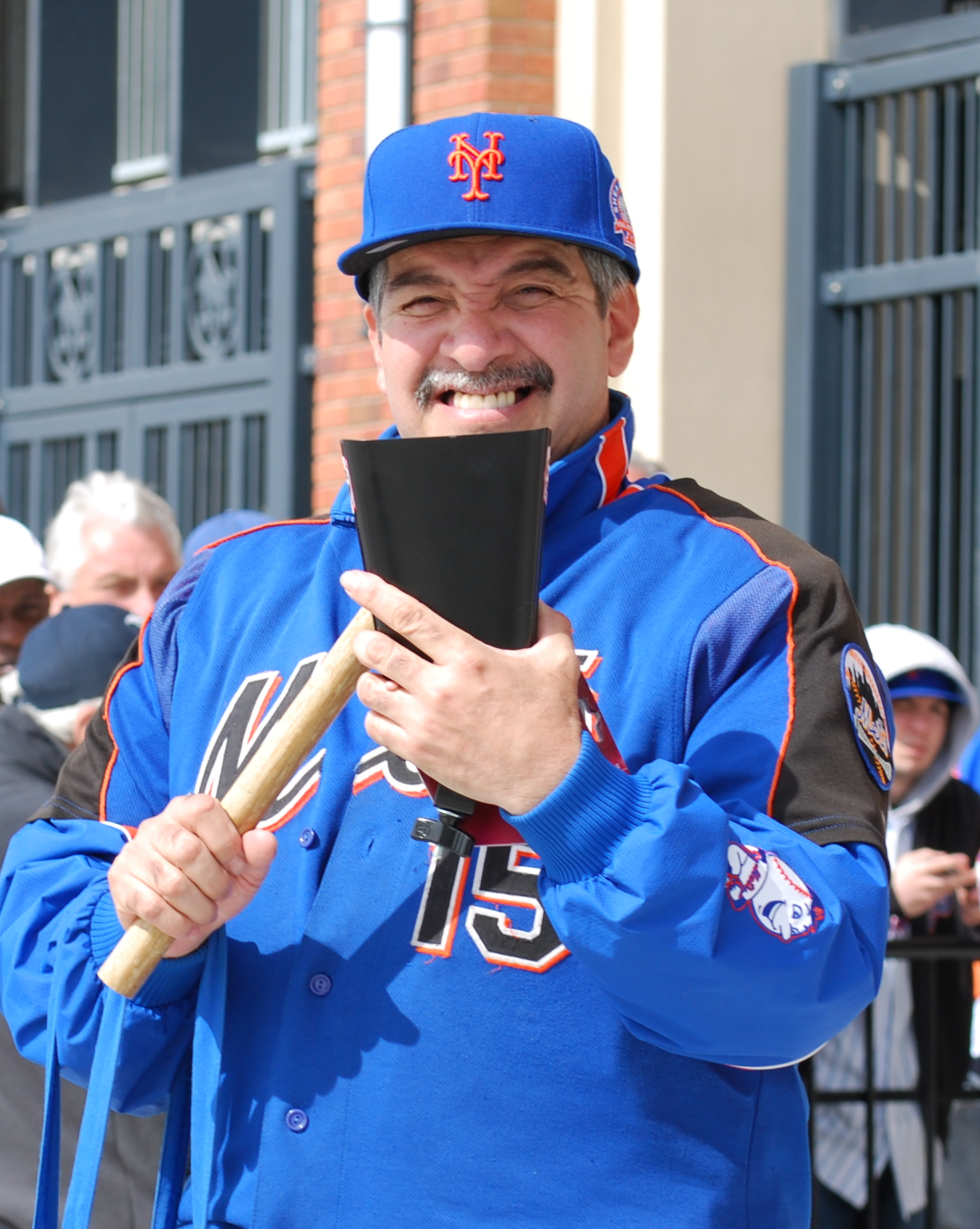
Cowbell Man in 2009

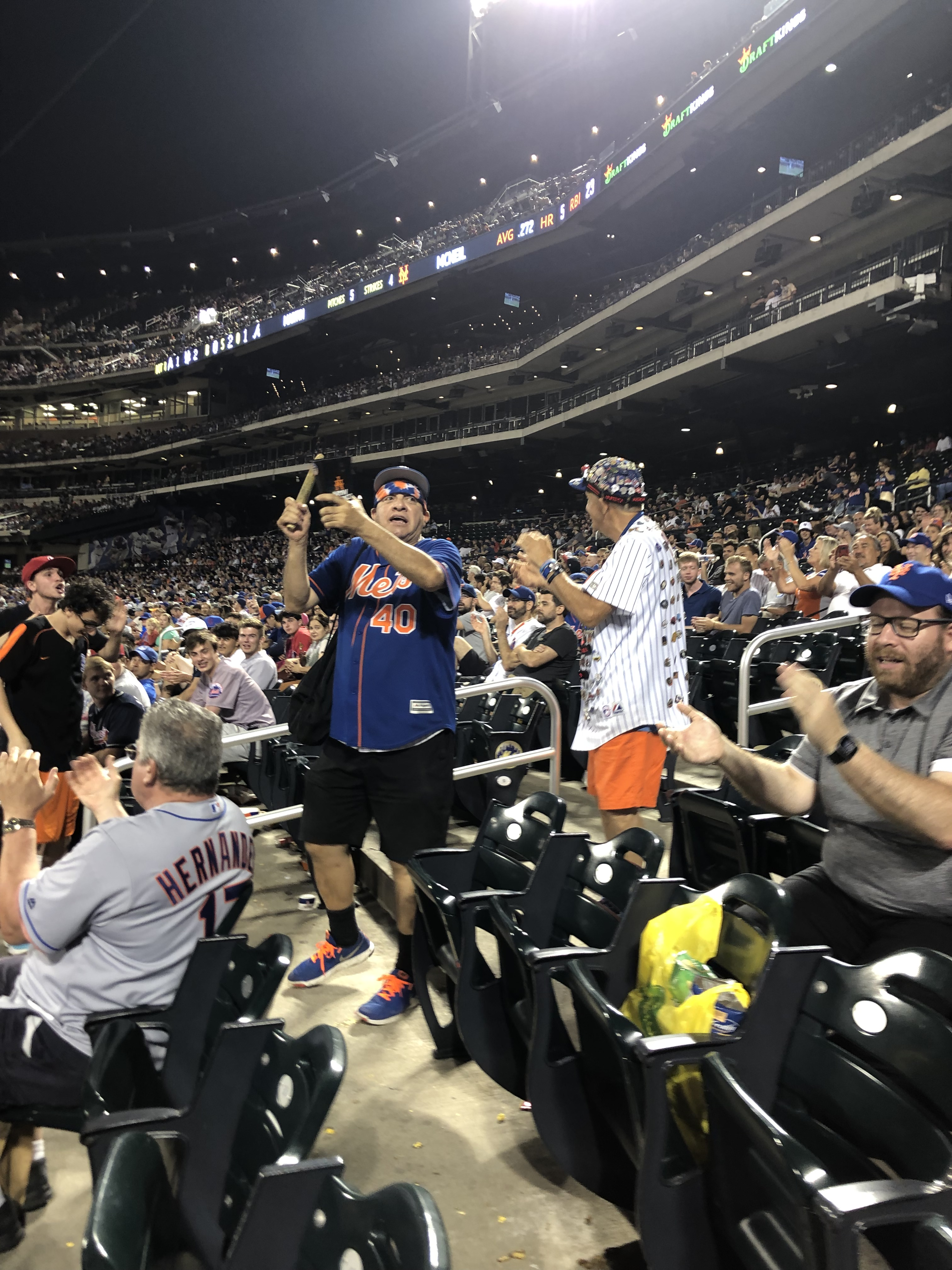
Cow Bell Man leading the New York Mets to a 2–1 victory over the Atlanta Braves on 7/28/2021.
