= Norber erratics =

Group of glacial boulders in England

Coordinates: 54.1234°N 2.3601°W

Norber erratic, December 2014

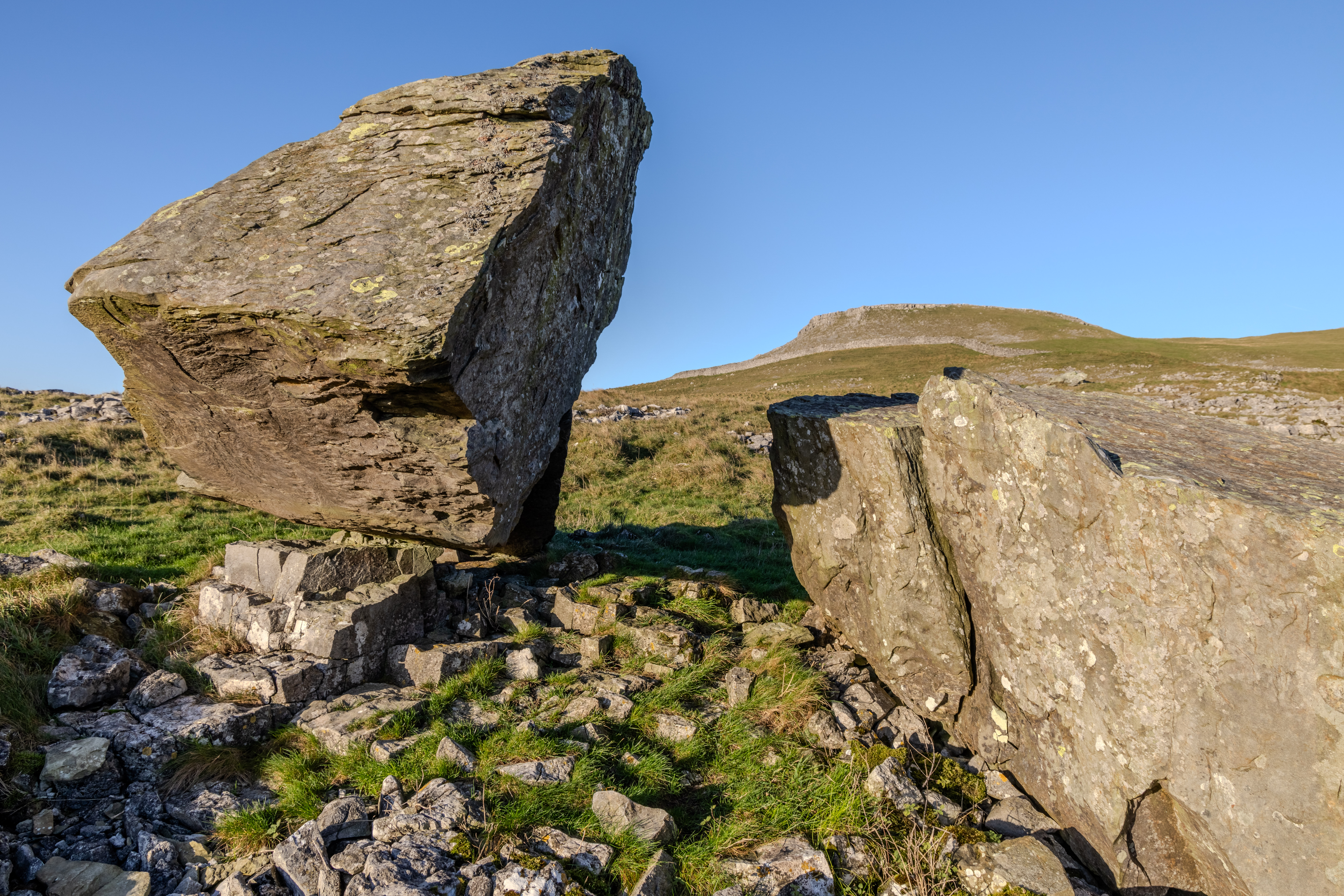
Norber Erratic, above Austwick at dawn in November 2025

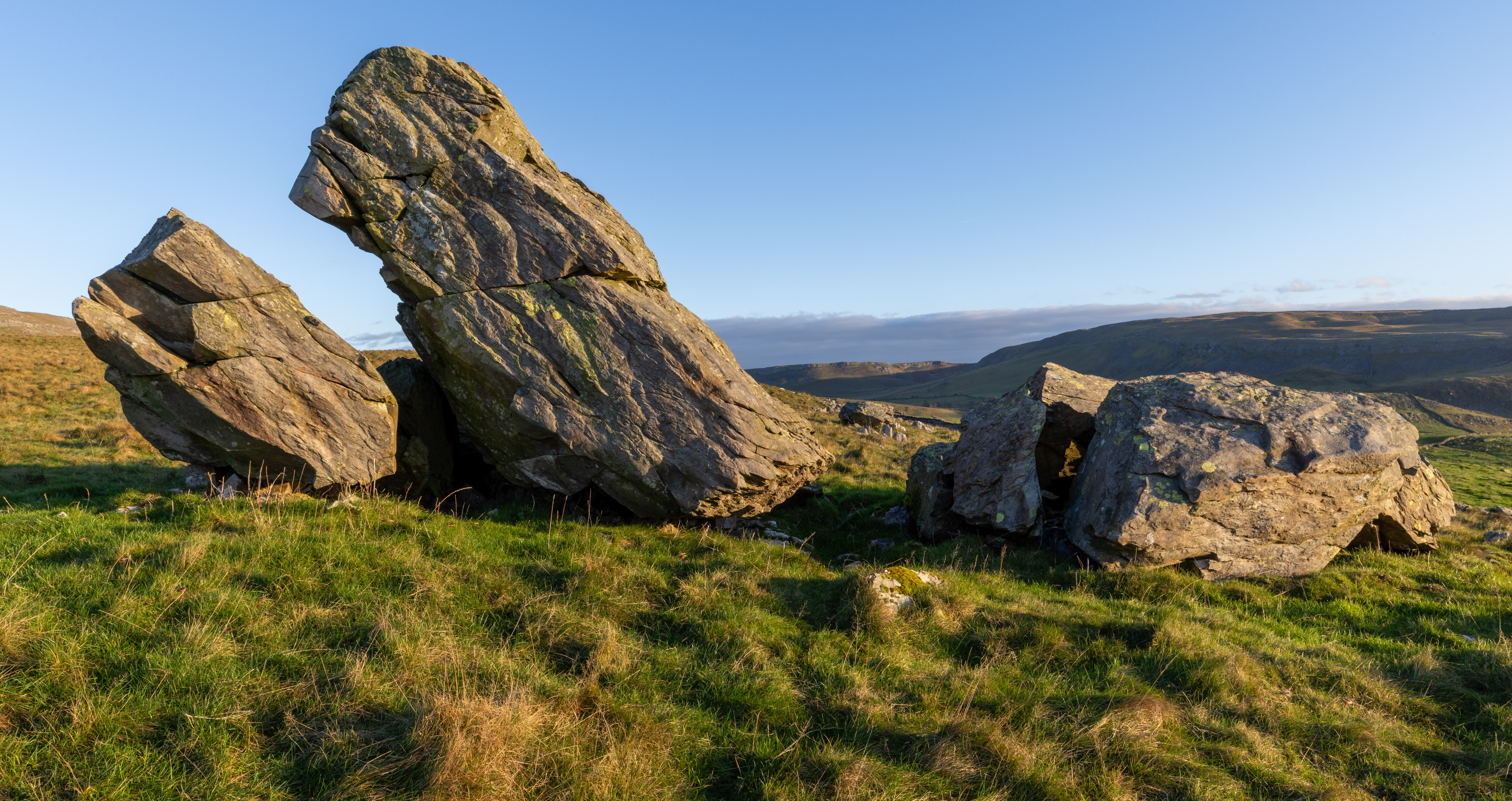
Norber Erratic, above Austwick at dawn in November 2025

The Norber erratics are a group of glacial erratic boulders in Britain. They are found on the southern slopes of Ingleborough, close to the village of Austwick in the Yorkshire Dales. The Ordnance Survey grid reference of the boulder field is SD764698.

The erratics are classic geomorphological features from the glaciation of northern England. In his chapter on the Pennines, A. E. Trueman wrote: "Particularly well known are the great perched blocks of dark grit which stand on the limestone platform at Norber near Settle."

Many of the Silurian greywacke boulders at the site are perched on pedestals of limestone up to 30cm high. The boulders were probably deposited by melting ice sheets at the end of the last ice age, around 12,000 years ago. The pedestals have developed because the erratic boulders have protected the underlying limestone from solution by rainfall, giving estimates of the rate of lowering of the surrounding limestone pavement of around 25mm per 1000 years. Recent cosmogenic dating suggests that the boulders have been exposed for around 17,900 years.
