= Feizor =

Hamlet in North Yorkshire, England

Coordinates: 54.104°N 2.323°W

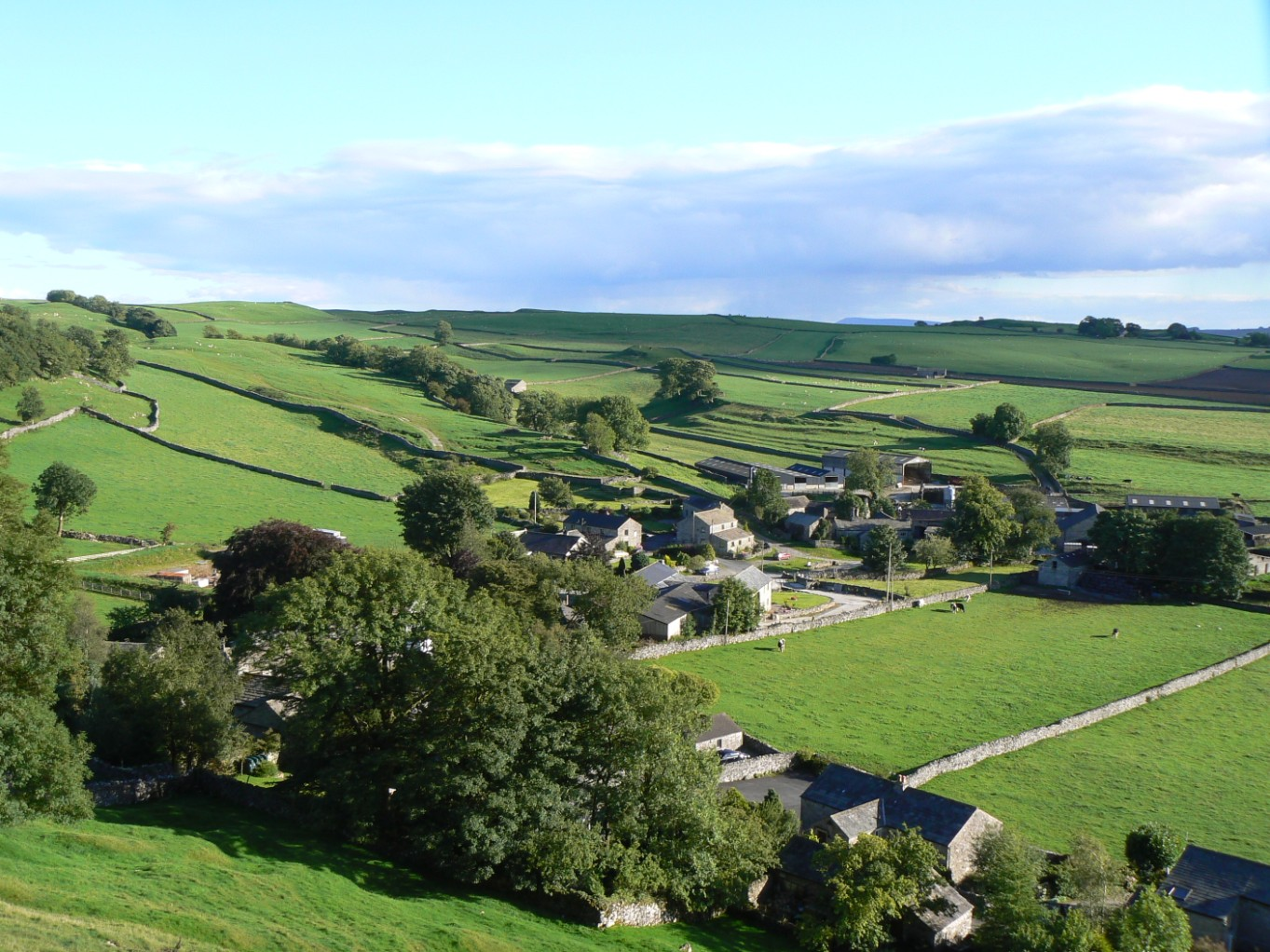
View of the settlement

Feizor is a hamlet in the Yorkshire Dales National Park, England.

== Toponymy ==
The name derives from "Fech's ergh", with Fech being a Norse-Gael given name (Fíach) and ergh meaning shieling or summer pasture. A local landowner named Fech was recorded at the time of the Norman Conquest.

== Village ==
Feizor is noted for its beautiful limestone scenery. The hamlet lies near the limestone escarpments of Pot Scar, Smearsett Scar, and Giggleswick Scar on the South Craven Fault. The area offers good walking. The village offers walkers a bed-and-breakfast and a tearoom. Since 2015 Settle Falconry has been based from Elaine's Tearoom, offering hands-on Falconry Experiences from there.
