= Austwick =

Village and civil parish in North Yorkshire, England

- Village and parish
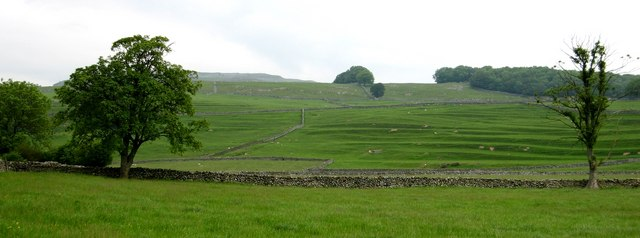
- Ancient field systems and lynchets west of Austwick

- Location within North Yorkshire
- Population: 463 (2011 census)
- OS grid reference: SD767685
- Civil parish: Austwick
- Unitary authority: North Yorkshire
- Ceremonial county: North Yorkshire
- Region: Yorkshire and the Humber
- Country: England
- Sovereign state: United Kingdom
- Post town: LANCASTER
- Postcode district: LA2
- Police: North Yorkshire
- Fire: North Yorkshire
- Ambulance: Yorkshire
- UK Parliament: Skipton and Ripon

Austwick is a village and civil parish in North Yorkshire, England, about 5 miles (8 km) north-west of Settle and on the edge of the Yorkshire Dales National Park.

Before local government reorganisation in 1974 Austwick parish was within Settle Rural District, in the West Riding of Yorkshire. From 1974 to 2023 it was part of the Craven District and is now administered by the unitary North Yorkshire Council.

According to the Austwick & Lawkland Tithe Map of 21 October 1851 the parish has an area of 8,201 acres (33.19 km^{2}), of which around a quarter is uncut moorland. The highest point is Lord's Seat on Simon Fell at 2,079 feet (634 m).

== Toponymy ==
Austwick comes from Old Norse (austr, meaning east) and Old English (wīc, meaning settlement/dwelling).

== History ==
The area around Austwick has been inhabited by humans for more than 4,000 years. Dudderhouse Hill long cairn (54.1424°N 2.3605°W) to the north of the village is long cairn burial mound from the Neolithic period. It is a scheduled ancient monument. Archaeological finds in and around the village include prehistoric burial places, a large Bronze Age settlement, and an Iron Age settlement. The area surrounding Austwick has many ancient remains, including extensive walls and structures of slate, limestone and sandstone.

At one time Austwick, Clapham, Lawkland and Newby were independent manors with their own lord and together formed the larger parish of Clapham. In Domesday Book, a survey of England conducted in 1086, Austwick was the head of 12 manors spread along a northern route. Austwick still has a lord of the manor, the most recent holder of the position being Dr John Farrer, who died in 2014. The Farrer family has held the position of lord of the manor since 1782. Austwick Hall, a grade II listed building, is said to have originally been part of a pele tower. The building was renovated in the 17th and 19th centuries, though evidence of its purchase by the Ingilby family points to the year 1573.

A local folktale tells of an Austwick man who fell into a deep pool. As bubbles broke on the surface of the water his companions thought they could hear the words "T' b-best's at t' b-bottom", so they jumped into the pool as well and were not seen again.

The Anglican church in the village was originally a lecture hall but was later converted into the Church of the Epiphany. The grade-II-listed structure was consecrated in 1841.

The village was originally in the Wapentake of Ewecross, later being part of the Settle Rural District in the county of the West Riding of Yorkshire. It became part of North Yorkshire in 1974. Austwick was originally in the Parish of Settle but became a parish in its own right in May 1879.

Austwick was on the original turnpike road between Keighley and Kendal, which north-west of Settle became the A65. The village was bypassed progressively in the 1980s and early 1990s.

== Demographics ==
According to the 2001 census the parish had a population of 476 with an average age of 45.4 years (neighbouring parishes: Clapham parish 39.9 years, Lawkland parish 39.4 years, England: 38.6 years). There are 231 dwellings and 212 households. 36% are pensioner households, 33% of households have an occupant with a long-term illness and 25% of households have children. The parish includes the village of Austwick and the hamlet of Wharfe.

In 2014 the boundaries of Austwick parish were changed. The part of the parish south of the A65 road was passed to Lawkland parish and the part of Lawkland parish north of the A65 (including the hamlet of Feizor) was passed to Austwick parish. Austwick Common and Austwick Moss are now no longer in the parish of Austwick. The boundaries of Austwick and Lawkland parishes had been in existence since at least 1851 at the time of the drawing up of the Tithe map.

== See also ==
- Listed buildings in Austwick
