= Listed buildings in Bainbridge, North Yorkshire =

Bainbridge is a civil parish in the county of North Yorkshire, England. It contains 43 listed buildings that are recorded in the National Heritage List for England. Of these, one is listed at Grade II*, the middle of the three grades, and the others are at Grade II, the lowest grade. The parish contains the villages of Bainbridge, Countersett, Stalling Busk, Marsett and Worton, and it extends to the south into Raydale. Most of the listed buildings are houses, cottages and associated structures, farmhouses and farm buildings. The others include bridges, Friends' meeting houses, a set of stocks, a hotel and a public house, a church and the ruins of an earlier church, a former grammar school, and a telephone kiosk.

== Key ==
Grade	Criteria
II*	Particularly important buildings of more than special interest
II	Buildings of national importance and special interest

== Buildings ==
Name and location	Photograph	Date	Notes	Grade
Bridge over River Bain; 54.30659°N 2.10192°W		16th century	The bridge, which was widened in 1785 by John Carr, carries the A684 road over the River Bain. It is in stone, and consists of a single arch that is slightly pointed on the upstream side, and semicircular on the downstream side. The parapet has segmental coping.	II
Worton Hall; 54.30654°N 2.07027°W	—	1600	A stone house with quoins and a stone slate roof. There are two storeys and three bays, and an added porch. The windows are mullioned, some with chamfered and/or moulded surrounds. The porch has two storeys, and contains a doorway with a chamfered quoined surround and a slab lintel, above which is a three-light mullioned window with a hood mould. The inner doorway has a chamfered surround and a dated and inscribed lintel.	II
Countersett Hall; 54.28676°N 2.12580°W		1650	A manor house in stone with quoins and a stone slate roof. There are two storeys and six bays. In the second bay is a projecting two-storey porch containing a round-arched doorway with interrupted jambs, imposts and a keystone, over which is a datestone and a stepped hood mould. Above this is a three-light stepped window with a stepped hood mould, a pigeon loft, and a coped gable with corbel-shaped kneelers. The inner doorway has a chamfered surround. The other bays contain mullioned windows, one with seven lights, and sash windows, the ground floor windows under a continuous hood mould.	II*
Outbuilding south of Countersett Hall; 54.28661°N 2.12570°W	—	17th century (probable)	The outbuilding is in stone with quoins and a stone slate roof coped on the right. There are two storeys and a lean-to at the rear. The openings include board doors and windows. At the rear is a double bee bole, and on the right return are steps leading to an upper floor doorway.	II
Cravenholme; 54.30822°N 2.10149°W	—	17th century	A farmhouse and outhouse, later combined, in stone, with quoins and stone slate roofs. There are two storeys, the farmhouse has four bays and the former outhouse, recessed on the left, has two bays. The doorway in the house has a chamfered quoined surround, and the windows are mullioned or fire windows. In the former outhouse is a doorway with a quoined surround, a four-centred arched head and moulding in the arris, and the windows have chamfered surrounds.	II
High Blean; 54.28006°N 2.11371°W		17th century	A farmhouse, cottage and farm buildings under one roof, and two coach houses at right angles at the ends. They are in stone with stone slate roofs and two storeys. The house is dated 1674, and has three bays. In the centre is a porch with applied Tuscan columns, and a pediment containing a round-headed initialled and dated stone. The windows are sashes, some with mullions. The outbuilding on the left has external steps up to a doorway, and the coach house to its left has quoins, and a segmental arch with voussoirs and a hood mould. The cottage is to the right of the farmhouse, to its right is an outbuilding with external steps, and the coach house on the right is gabled.	II
Old Hall; 54.30622°N 2.10376°W		17th century	The house is in stone with a stone slate roof. There are two storeys, three bays, and a single-storey gabled outbuilding projecting on the right. The doorway has a chamfered quoined surround, moulding on the arris, a triangular soffit to the lintel, and a hood mould. The windows on the front are chamfered and mullioned with three lights and hood moulds, and at the rear are sashes.	II
Stocks; 54.30710°N 2.10314°W		17th century (probable)	The stocks on the village green consist of two stone pillars, between which are a fixed timber bottom plank and a moveable top plank, and between them are two leg holes. An adjacent boulder was probably used as a seat.	II
The Boar; 54.28649°N 2.12622°W	—	1667	The house, possibly previously an inn, in stone with a stone slate roof and two storeys. In the centre is a doorway, a blocked fire window to the left, and mullioned windows to the right. In the upper floor is a recessed panel with an inscription and the date, a three-light window and a sash window.	II
Manor House, Bainbridge; 54.30833°N 2.10357°W		1670	The house is in stone with quoins and a hipped stone slate roof. There are two storeys and three bays. The middle bay projects as a two-storey gabled porch with kneelers, and contains a doorway with a quoined surround, moulding in the arris, and a triangular soffit to the lintel that has the date in a recessed panel. Above it is a string course, and in the gable is an inscribed panel with a dog-tooth border. The windows are mullioned with two or three lights.	II
Carr End and wall 54.27755°N 2.13899°W		Late 17th century	A farmhouse, later divided into two, is in stone with a stone slate roof, two storeys and four bays. The doorway has a stone surround, and the windows on the front are sashes, those in the upper floor in architraves, and at the rear is a Venetian window. The screen wall, projecting at right angles, contains a doorway and two decorated, dated and initialled lintels.	II
Raydale House and Forest View; 54.25509°N 2.15300°W		Late 17th century	A farmhouse and a cottage under one stone slate roof, the cottage being the older, and the farmhouse dating from the 19th century. The house is rendered, and has two storeys, four bays, and a rear outshut. On the front is a doorway with a fanlight and sash windows, those in the ground floor with mullions; all the openings have quoined surrounds. The cottage to the right has two storeys and three bays, and contains chamfered mullioned windows in the ground floor and casement windows above.	II
Green's View; 54.27089°N 2.14930°W	—	1676	A farmhouse and outbuilding in stone, with quoins and a stone slate roof. There are two storeys and two bays. In the centre is a doorway, above which is an initialled and dated panel. On the front are sash windows and a fire window with a chamfered surround, and at the rear is a round-headed stair window with slab jambs, imposts and voussoirs.	II
White House; 54.28684°N 2.12615°W	—	1683	A farmhouse and an outbuilding under one roof, in stone on a plinth, with a stone slate roof and two storeys. The house has two bays, and the outbuilding to the left has a single bay. In the house, the central doorway has a chamfered quoined surround, a triangular soffit to the lintel, which is dated and initialled, and a hood mould. The windows are chamfered mullioned sashes. The outbuilding has a door, and a small window in each floor.	II
West End House, cottage and outbuilding 54.27067°N 2.15155°W	—	1686	A house and cottage under one roof, with an attached outbuilding, they are in stone, the house and cottage painted, with stone slate roofs, The house and cottage have two storeys, six bays, a rear outshut, and quoins. The house has a doorway with a segmental head, a quoined surround, and a beaded arris, above which is a dated and initialled plaque. The windows are chamfered and mullioned, some with moulding. The cottage has sash windows, and the single-storey outbuilding to the right has a doorway with an architrave and a hood mould.	II
Dale Farmhouse and outbuildings 54.30648°N 2.06917°W	—	1691	A farmhouse, cottage, and farm buildings under one roof, and a coach house projecting on the left, in stone with stone slate roofs. There are two storeys and six bays. The house has a central doorway with a moulded arris, a decorated, dated and initialled lintel, and sash windows. The cottage to the left has a single bay, a doorway with a slab lintel, and sash windows, and the farm buildings to the right have quoins, a blocked semicircular arch with voussoirs, a hood mould, and external steps. The coach house also has a segmental arch with voussoirs and a hood mould.	II
Victoria Arms Public House; 54.30521°N 2.06630°W		1698	The public house is in stone with a stone slate roof, two storeys and three bays. On the front is a doorway with a stone surround, and above it is a semicircular stone inscribed with initials and the date. The windows are sashes with slab surrounds, and there is a blocked fire window. On the right, stone steps lead to an upper floor door.	II
Chapel House; 54.28715°N 2.12527°W	—	Late 17th to early 18th century	A house and a byre with a hay loft above, combined into one house, it is in stone with a stone slate roof and two storeys. The house has three bays and a central doorway. The windows vary; some are chamfered and mullioned, some mullions have been removed, and there are fire windows. The former byre to the right is slightly recessed, with two bays, and has external steps leading to an upper floor doorway.	II
Little Ings Bridge; 54.28184°N 2.11932°W		Late 17th to early 18th century	The bridge, which carries a road over a stream, is in stone. It consists of a single segmental arch with voussoirs and a slab hood mould.	II
Low Force Farmhouse; 54.28576°N 2.10930°W	—	Late 17th to early 18th century	The farmhouse is in stone with a stone slate roof. The main block has two storeys and three bays, and the rear wing on the left has three storeys. The central doorway has a plain surround, and the windows on the front are sashes. Elsewhere, there are windows with chamfered surrounds, some with mullions, and one with a hood mould.	II
Semer Water Bridge; 54.28502°N 2.12236°W		Late 17th to early 18th century	The bridge carries a road over the River Bain near the entrance to Semer Water. It is in stone and consists of three segmental arches with voussoirs and slab hood moulds. The bridge has triangular cutwaters that rise to form pedestrian retreats, and the parapets have crudely shaped slab coping.	II
High Force Farmhouse and outbuildings 54.28400°N 2.10743°W		1710	The farmhouse is rendered, the flanking projecting outbuildings are in stone, and the roofs are in stone slate. The farmhouse has two storeys and three bays. It has a central doorway, above which is a re-set initialled and dated lintel in a raised panel, and sash windows. The outbuildings have a single storey, quoins and hipped roofs, and each contains a segmental archway with voussoirs. By the right outbuilding are two double pairs of bee boles.	II
Quaker Meeting House; 54.28702°N 2.12549°W		1710	The meeting house is in stone with quoins and a stone slate roof. There is a single storey and three bays. On the front is a doorway and sash windows; all the openings have hood moulds. Inside there is an elders' gallery.	II
Ruins of old St Matthew's Church; 54.27254°N 2.13006°W		1722	The rebuilding of a church of 1603, it is now disused and a ruin. It is in stone, without a roof, and has fronts of three and two bays, and a later single-storey porch containing benches. The church contains a square-headed doorway with a chamfered surround, and windows, one with a remaining mullion. Inside, there are two arcades of two segmental-headed arches.	II
Thwaite View; 54.27074°N 2.15022°W	—	1734	A farmhouse in stone with a stone slate roof, two storeys and two bays. The central doorway has an architrave on plinths, with impost jambs and a keystone. Above it is a dated and initialled stone, and the windows are mullioned with two or three lights.	II
Summer Tree House and outbuilding 54.30569°N 2.07055°W	—	1740	The house and outbuilding are in stone, with stone slate roofs and two storeys. The house has quoins, three bays, and a rear outshut. The central doorway has a quoined surround with moulding on the chamfer, and a lintel with a triangular soffit, decorative motifs on the spandrels, and it is inscribed with the date, initials and motifs. Above it is a square plaque and a single-light window. The other windows have chamfered surrounds, architraves, three lights and mullions. The outbuilding recessed to the right contains a doorway in each floor and stone steps. On the left return of the house is a crudely inscribed panel.	II
Holly House; 54.29194°N 2.11901°W	—	1740	A farmhouse with an attached cottage and outbuilding in stone, with quoins and a stone slate roof. There are two storeys and four bays. In the centre is a porch containing an inner doorway with a stone surround on plinths, an inscribed and dated lintel, and a pulvinated frieze, and the windows are sashes in architraves. The cottage to the left has a lintel with a basket-arched soffit and a keystone, and the windows are sashes. To the right is an outbuilding with small windows.	II
Hill Top; 54.28619°N 2.12504°W	—	1750	A stone house on a plinth, with quoins, a moulded cornice, and a stone slate roof with stone coping and shaped kneelers. There are two storeys, three bays, and a rear outshut. The central doorway has a quoined surround and a dated lintel, and the windows are sashes.	II
Rose and Crown Hotel; 54.30865°N 2.10313°W		Late 18th century	The hotel, which has been extended and which incorporates earlier material, is in roughcast stone, and has a stone slate roof. There are two storeys, nine bays, and a later two-bay extension. On the front is a porch, above which is a datestone, and two square bay windows, and the other windows are sashes.	II
South View; 54.27092°N 2.14977°W	—	Late 18th century	A stone house with a stone slate roof, two storeys, three bays, and a central projecting gabled outhouse. The windows are casements, some with mullions, or have fixed lights.	II
Manor House and railings, Worton; 54.30548°N 2.06973°W		1781	The house is in stone with quoins and a stone slate roof. There are two storeys and two bays. The central doorway has a moulded cornice, and the windows are sashes with sandstone sills and lintels. On the right return is a dated and initialled rainwater head. In front of the house are cast iron railings with fleur-de-lis finials on a stone wall with saddleback coping.	II
Yore Bridge; 54.31215°N 2.10375°W		1793	The bridge, which was designed by John Carr, carries a road over the River Ure. It is in stone, and consists of three segmental arches with voussoirs, and is flanked by chamfered rusticated pilasters. The bridge has triangular cutwaters on the upstream side, and parapets with segmental coping ending in bollards.	II
Old Silk Mill; 54.27951°N 2.13591°W		c. 1800	The silk mill, later used for other purposes, is in gritstone with large quoins and a stone slate roof. There are two storeys, and the openings include doorways, windows, some of which are blocked, and square vents.	II
Low Mill; 54.30791°N 2.10202°W		Late 18th to early 19th century	A watermill in stone, with quoins, projecting through stones, and a stone slate roof. There are two storeys, a basement and a loft, and two bays. It contains a doorway and fixed windows, one window and a semicircular arch with voussoirs and a hood mould. Above one window is a wooden beam with pulley-wheel, and inside is a low-breastshot waterwheel.	II
School House and railings 54.28682°N 2.12516°W		Late 18th to early 19th century	The school, later a private house, is in stone, with quoins and a stone slate roof. There is a single storey and a basement, and to the right is a lower two-storey extension. The main part contains a doorway, a sash window and a fixed-light window. In front of the garden are wrought iron railings with knob and urn finials.	II
Wood End Lodge; 54.27913°N 2.14117°W		Early 19th century	A stone house with quoins, a sill band, and a hipped stone slate roof. There are two storeys and three bays. The central doorway has an architrave on a plinth, a pulvinated frieze, and a cornice on consoles, and the windows are sashes.	II
High Blean House and outbuilding 54.27915°N 2.11539°W	—	Early to mid 19th century	The house and outbuilding are in stone and have a stone slate roof with stone coping and shaped kneelers. There are two storeys, and the house has two bays, quoins, and shaped gutter brackets. The central doorway has a stone surround with splayed bases on plinths, a segmental-arched soffit to the lintel, a pulvinated frieze and a cornice. The windows are sashes in stone surrounds. The outbuilding to the left has a doorway with a stone surround and shaped gutter brackets.	II
Friends' Meeting House; 54.30927°N 2.10222°W		1841	The meeting house is in stone, and has a stone slate roof with stone copings and kneelers. There is a single storey and three bays. On the front are two doorways, one with splayed bases and plinths, and the other with a fanlight, and the windows are sashes.	II
Stable and hayloft, Friends' Meeting House; 54.30930°N 2.10202°W	—	1841	The stable with hayloft above is in stone with a stone slate roof and two storeys. On the south front are two stable doorways and slit vents, and on the north front is a stable door and two loft doors above.	II
Yorebridge Grammar School; 54.31194°N 2.10327°W		1848	The former grammar school is in stone, and has oversailing eaves on timber brackets, and a Welsh slate roof. There is a single storey and five bays, the middle bay projecting as a gabled two-storey porch. The round-arched doorway has a chamfered surround with quoined rustication, and a fanlight. Above it is a round-arched window, and the other windows on the front are sashes. In the returns are round-arched windows with imposts and keystones, and in the left gable end is a dated plaque.	II
Yorebridge House, walls and railings 54.31162°N 2.10318°W		1850	A schoolmaster's house, later used for other purposes, it is in stone with a sill band and a Welsh slate roof. There are two storeys and three bays, and a single-storey porch recessed on the left, containing a doorway with a chamfered surround. The middle bay projects slightly and contains a canted bay window, and the other windows are sashes with sandstone lintels, and cornices on consoles. In the central gable is a dated and initialled shield, and on the gables are fleur-de-lis crosses. Attached at the rear is a screen wall containing a fragment of an earlier building, a doorway and a mullioned window. Facing the road is a low curving coped wall carrying railings with fleur-de-lis finials and a gate.	II
St Matthew's Church, Stalling Busk; 54.26867°N 2.13015°W		1909	The church, designed by T. Gerard Davidson in Arts and Crafts style, is built in sandstone with a Westmorland slate. It consists of a nave, a chancel, a baptistry and narthex, and small north and south transepts. Features include buttresses in the form of cutwaters, three quatrefoils at each end, a circular window in the gable of the nave, and a bell under the projecting gable of the narthex.	II
Telephone kiosk, Marsett; 54.27140°N 2.15023°W		1935	The K6 type telephone kiosk was designed by Giles Gilbert Scott. Constructed in cast iron with a square plan and a dome, it has three unperforated crowns in the top panels.	II
