= Aberdeen Community Energy =

Coordinates: 57°10′35″N 2°6′47″W

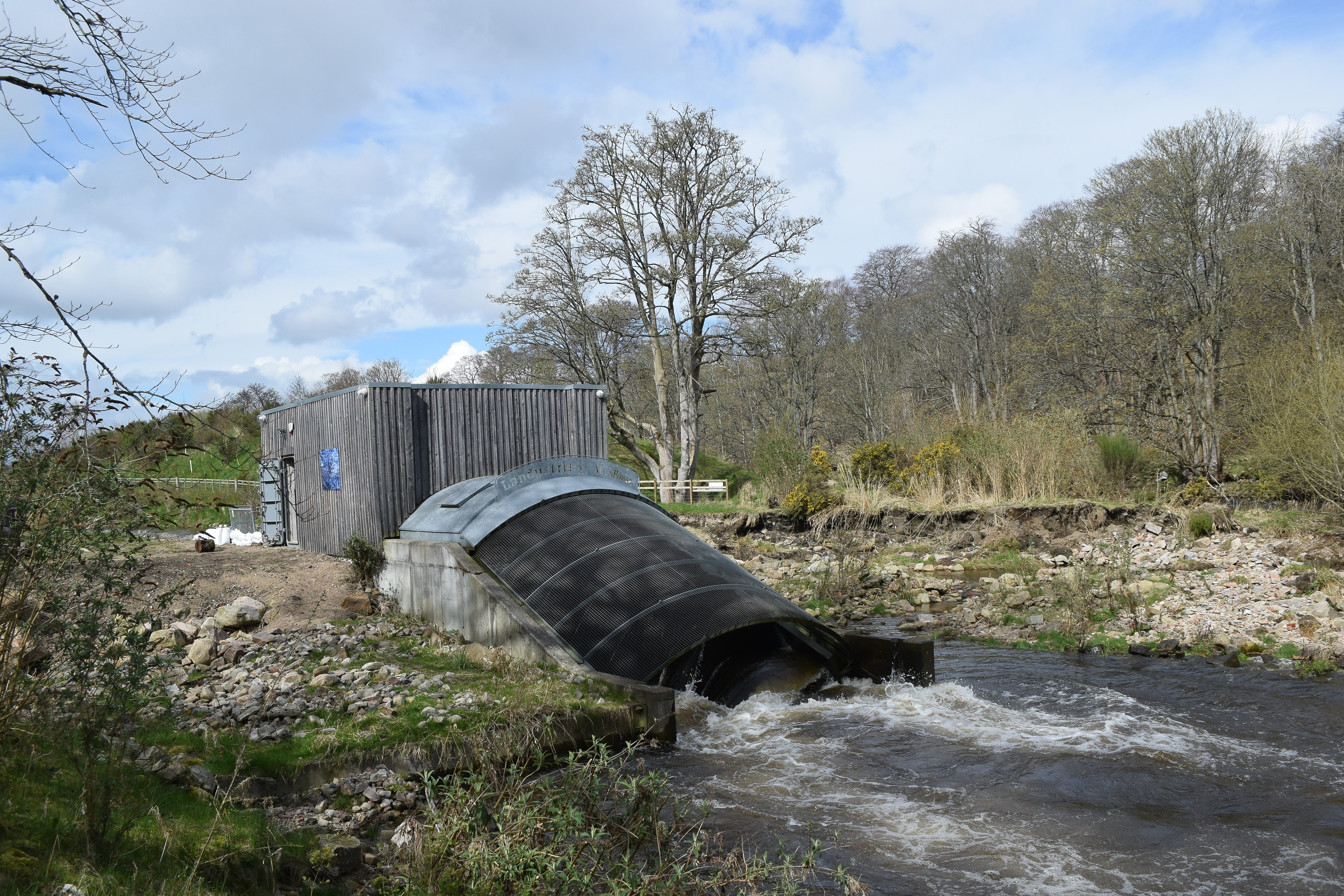
Archimedes screw and turbine house

Aberdeen Community Energy operate a micro hydro scheme at Tillydrone on the River Don, Aberdeen.

== History ==
Aberdeen Community Energy (ACE) is the trading name of Donside Community Hydro Limited, a Community Benefit Society set up in 2015 to build and operate a hydro scheme on the River Don at Tillydrone, Aberdeen. The development phase was funded through the Scottish Government's Community and Renewable Energy Scheme (CARES).

Funds were raised through community share and bond issues. The hydro began producing electricity in 2016, becoming Aberdeen's first community-led renewable energy project.

== Turbine ==
The turbine is on the site of the former Donside Papermill, at a bend of the River Don. The papermill occupied the site until its closure in 2001 and demolition in 2006. A lade cutting across a bend in the river supplies water to the turbine while the gradually sloping river bed produces a fall of about 2.5m across the screw. A feasibility study had indicated that the site had the potential to generate about 400 kW of power. The 100 kW Archimedes' screw turbine supplied by Landustrie was the most economically feasible with feed-in-tariffs. Electricity is sold to the National Grid through a power purchase agreement. Surplus revenue is channelled into social and environmental initiatives and community enterprise projects.

== Community benefit ==
ACE was set up by the Donside Community Association, residents of the nearby Donside Village. The former industrial area has been re-developed into a sustainable mixed community by Sanctuary Housing, one of the UK's largest social landlords. Energy efficient flats and houses have been built overlooking the river, with a mix of social housing, part buy and owner occupied properties. The riverside is being developed by the community for recreational use and wildlife value. The hill created by excavating the lade has been vegetated. Trees have been planted with donations from the Woodland Trust and Aberdeen City Council. Invasive plant species are being controlled.
