= Countersett Quaker Meeting House =

Historic building in North Yorkshire, England

Coordinates: 54°17′13″N 2°07′32″W

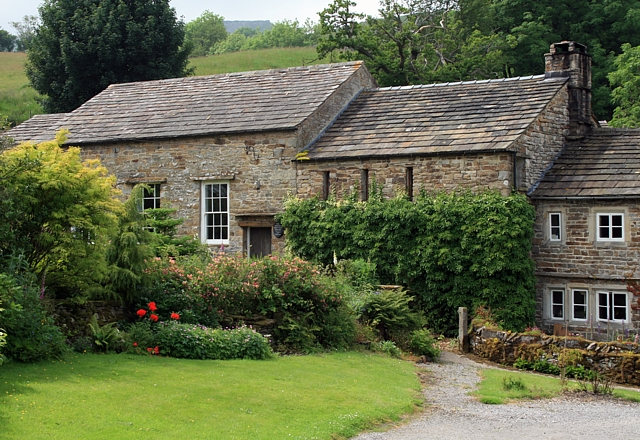
The building, in 2009

Countersett Quaker Meeting House is a historic building in Countersett, a village in North Yorkshire, in England.

Quakers met in Countersett Hall from the 1650s, initially illegally. From 1710, they instead met in a nearby barn which perhaps dated from the late 16th century. It was altered to make it suitable for worship, and was again altered in 1778, when it passed into the ownership of the Quakers. They used it until 1872, when they moved to a purpose-built structure. The meeting house was purchased by the Primitive Methodists, who used it until the 1970s. In the 1980s, the Quakers again began meeting in their old building, which they restored in the 1990s. In 2011, a small outbuilding was converted to provide a kitchen and toilet. The building was Grade II listed in 1986.

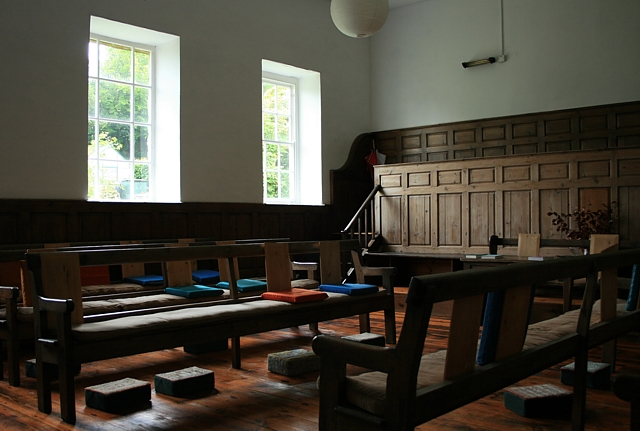
Interior of the building

The single-storey building is constructed of rubble, with a stone slate roof. It has three 12-pane sash windows, all on the main front, and dating from 1778. The entrance is to the right, and has a plank door. The rear elevation has two infilled windows and a blocked door, which are believed to date from the building's time in use as a barn. Inside, there is a panelled dado and an elders' gallery. Seating is provided by two types of simple bench. The floor has mostly broad floorboards, but there is also a stone slab which previously provided support for a stove, for heating.

== See also ==
- Listed buildings in Bainbridge, North Yorkshire
