= Cohors VI Nerviorum =

The Cohors VI Nerviorum (English: Sixth Cohort of Nervii) was an auxiliary unit of Roman Army Cohors quinquagenaria peditata type attested in the Roman province of Britannia from the second century to the early fifth century AD.

== Service in Britannia ==
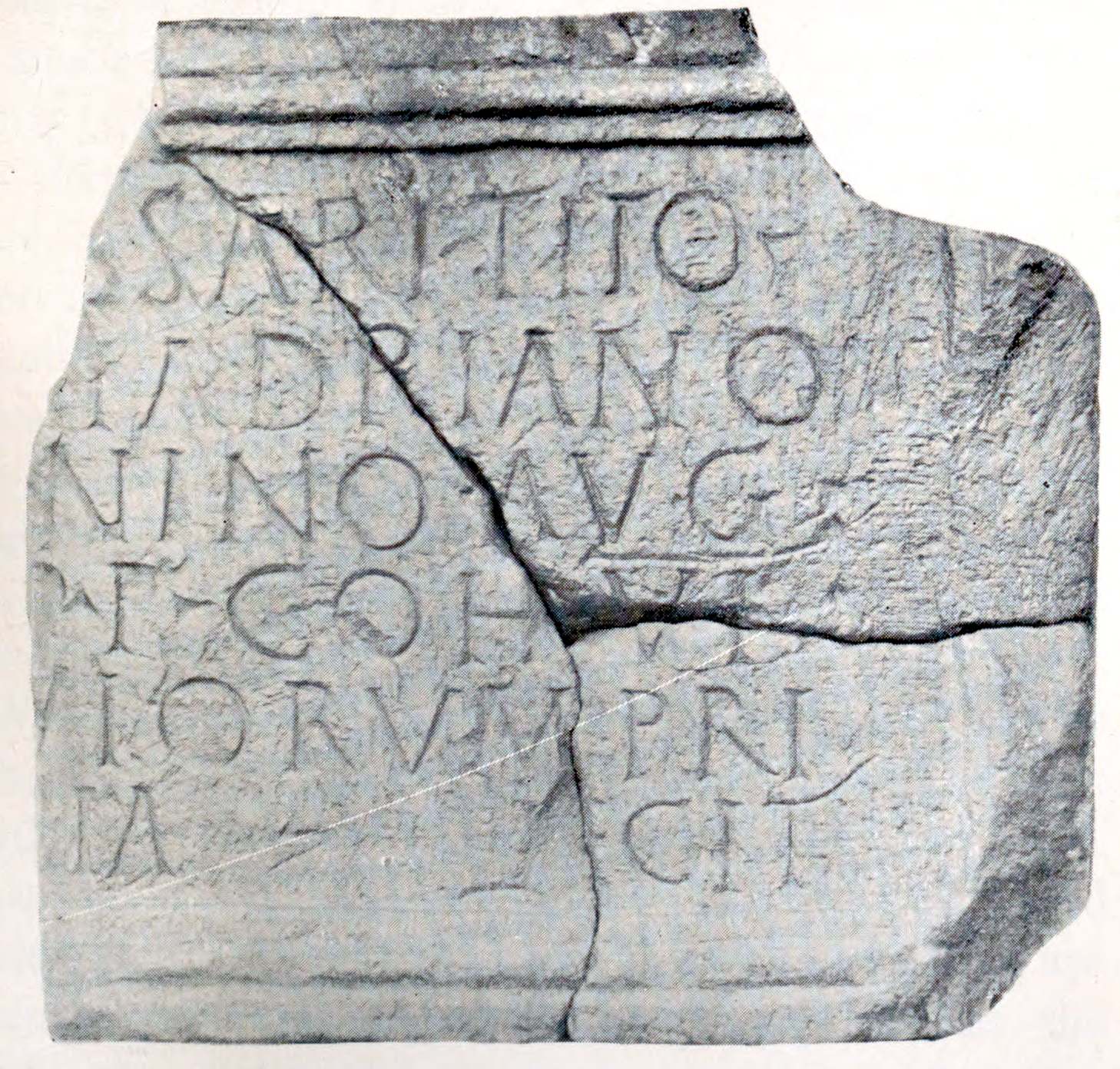
Tablet from Rough Castle Principia. RIB 2145. Dedication to Emperor Antoninus Pius. Sir George MacDonald calls it no. 29 in the 2nd edition of his book The Roman Wall in Scotland.

The cohort was based at Greatchesters fort on Hadrian's Wall intermittently from the second to the fourth century AD. Inscriptions found at Rough Castle Fort on the Antonine Wall in Scotland state that 480 men of the Cohors VI Nerviorum served there between 156–162 AD. One of its commanders was a centurion named Flavius Betto.

The cohort also rebuilt part of the Virosidum fort in present Bainbridge, North Yorkshire around 205-208 AD. In AD 205, whilst stationed at Virosium, the Prefect of the Cohort was Lucius Vinicius Pius.
