= River Bain Hydro =

Hydroelectric power station in North Yorkshire, England

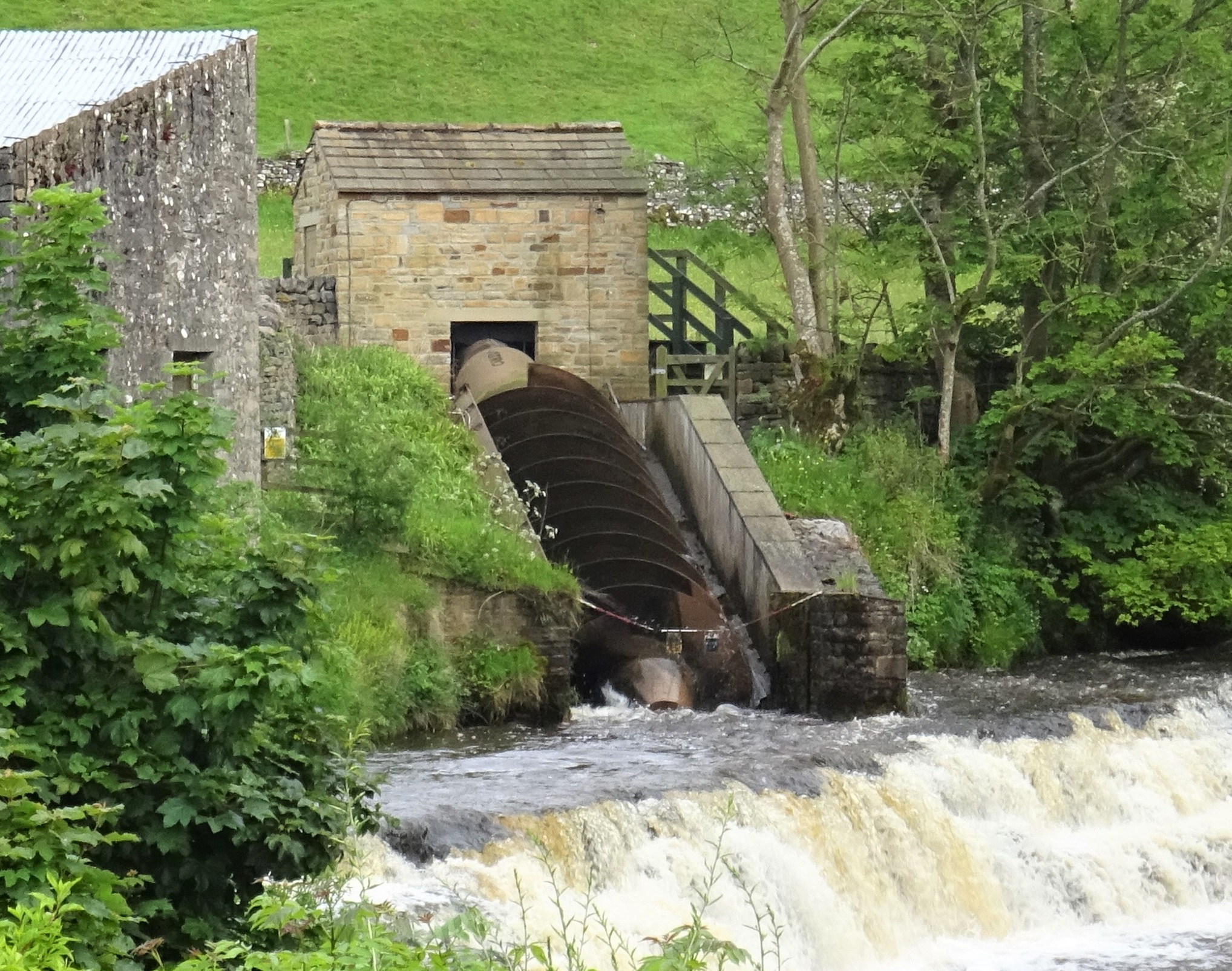
- The hydro plant on the River Bain at Bainbridge, North Yorkshire
- Country: England
- Location: North Yorkshire
- Coordinates: 54°18′21.5″N 2°06′04.6″W
- Status: Operational
- Construction began: 2010
- Commission date: May 2011
- Construction cost: £450,000
- Owner: River Bain Hydro

Power generation
- Nameplate capacity: 45 kW

The River Bain Hydro is a hydroelectric generator on the River Bain in the village of Bainbridge, North Yorkshire, England. Its screw turbine powers most of the properties in the village, with excess electricity being sold off to the National Grid. It was opened in 2011 with an installed capacity of 45 kW and is expected to last 40 years. It is a low-demand ecofriendly scheme.

== History ==
A hydro-power plant had been in existence on the site since the late 19th century. Like the new scheme, this was locally run but was wound up (as Bainbridge Electricity Supply) in 1953 when the National Grid took over supplying power to the area. The new plant was built between 2010 and 2011, with the 26 feet (7.9 m)-long Archimedes screw being brought in from a specialist engineering firm in Germany.

The plant, which was funded by a grant, a bank loan and a public share issue and cost £450,000 to build, opened in May 2011 and supplies enough power for 40 homes in the village of Bainbridge. The plant is expected to save more than 3,000 tonnes (3,300 tons) of carbon dioxide over its 40-year life.

In February 2023 the plant recorded its millionth Kilowatt Hour unit supplied to the national grid. However an over-estimate in the original feasibility study rated the plant able to operate in waterflow for 290 days per year. The lower water levels, particularly during the dry summers, meant that the plant operated on average only 196 days per year, at an average of 224 KwH per day of operation, which equated to enough to power 28 homes rather than the intended 40.

== See also ==
- Settle Hydro
- Torrs Hydro, New Mills
