= Cubeck =

Hamlet in North Yorkshire, England

Coordinates: 54.30131°N 2.07044°W

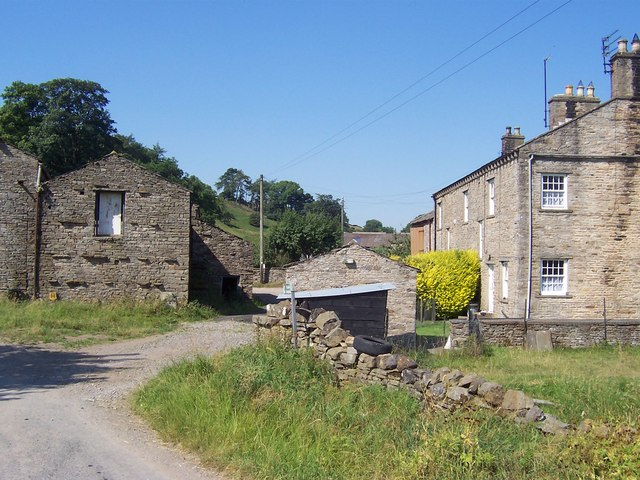
- Cubeck

- Location within North Yorkshire
- OS grid reference: SD955895
- Civil parish: Bainbridge
- Unitary authority: North Yorkshire
- Ceremonial county: North Yorkshire
- Region: Yorkshire and the Humber
- Country: England
- Sovereign state: United Kingdom
- Post town: LEYBURN
- Postcode district: DL8
- Police: North Yorkshire
- Fire: North Yorkshire
- Ambulance: Yorkshire

Cubeck is a hamlet in the county of North Yorkshire, England. It is near Thornton Rust and Worton and in the civil parish of Bainbridge. Metcalfe suggests the name derives from the Old English cu, and the Old Norse bekkr, meaning cow stream.

From 1974 to 2023 it was part of the district of Richmondshire, it is now administered by the unitary North Yorkshire Council.
