= Screw turbine =

Water turbine which uses the principle of the Archimedean screw

Reverse action of the Archimedean screw, the principle of the screw turbine gaining energy from water flowing down through the screw

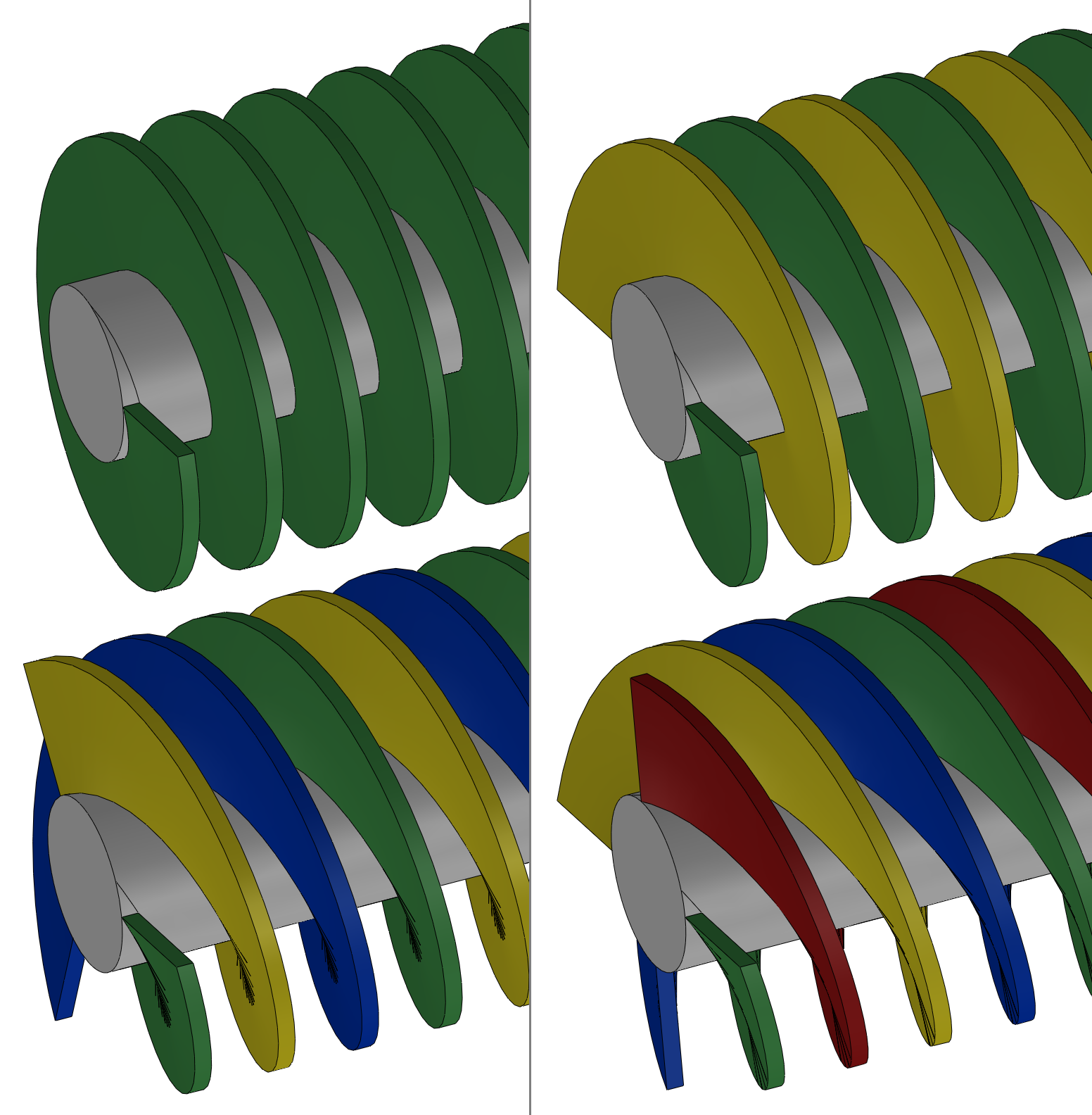
Screw turbines typically have three or four flights (second row)

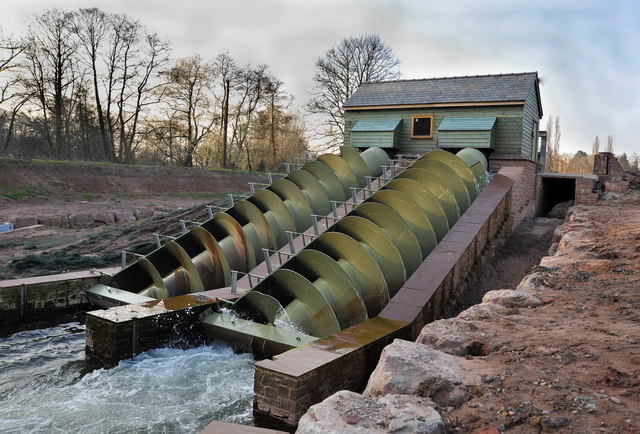
Two parallel screw turbines capable of producing 75 kW each, in Monmouth, South Wales

Video of a 40 kW screw turbine in Munich, Germany

A screw turbine (also known as an Archimedean turbine, Archimedes screw generator or ASG, or Archimedes screw turbine or AST) is a water turbine that converts the potential energy of water on an upstream level into work. This hydropower converter is driven by the weight of water, similar to water wheels, and can be considered as a quasi-static pressure machine. Archimedes screw generators operate in a wide range of flows (0.01 $m^3/s$ to 14.5 $m^3/s$) and heads (0.1 m to 10 m), including low heads and moderate flow rates that are not ideal for traditional turbines and not occupied by high performance technologies.

Archimedes' screw can be used to generate power if they are driven by flowing fluid instead of lifting fluid. Water transiting the screw from high to low elevation generates a torque on the helical plane surfaces, causing the screw to rotate. The Archimedes screw generator consists of a rotor in the shape of an Archimedean screw which rotates in a semicircular trough. Water flows into the screw and its weight presses down onto the blades of the turbine, which in turn forces the turbine to turn. Water flows freely off the end of the screw into the river. The upper end of the screw is connected to a generator through a gearbox. The Archimedes screw is theoretically a reversible hydraulic machine, and there are examples of single installations where screws can be used alternately as pumps and generators.

== History ==
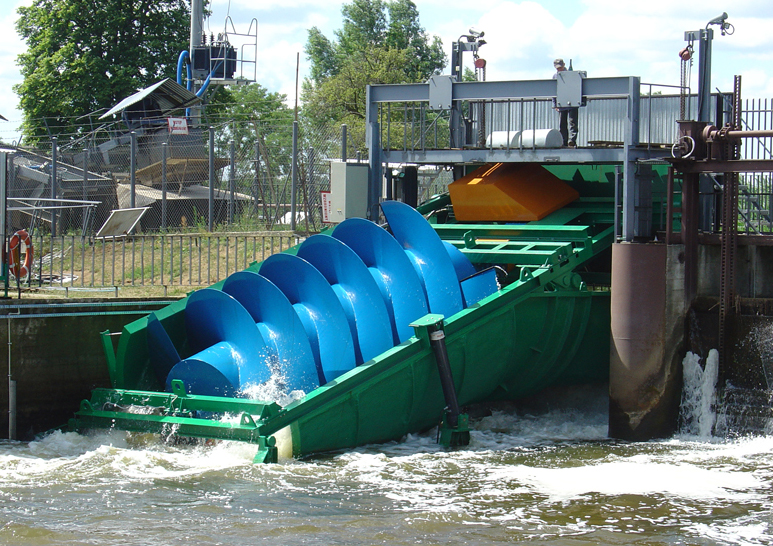
A screw turbine at a small hydro power plant in Goryn, Poland

The first records of a water screw, or screw pump, dates back to Ancient Mesopotamia, a cuneiform inscription of Assyrian king Sennacherib (704–681 BC) describes casting water screws in bronze. This is consistent with classical author Strabo, who describes the Hanging Gardens as watered by screws. The Archimedean screw is an ancient invention, attributed to Archimedes of Syracuse (287–212 BC.), and commonly used to raise water from a watercourse for irrigation purposes. In 1819 the French engineer Claude Louis Marie Henri Navier (1785–1836) suggested using the Archimedean screw as a type of water wheel. In 1916 William Moerscher applied for a U.S. patent on the hydrodynamic screw turbine.

== Application ==
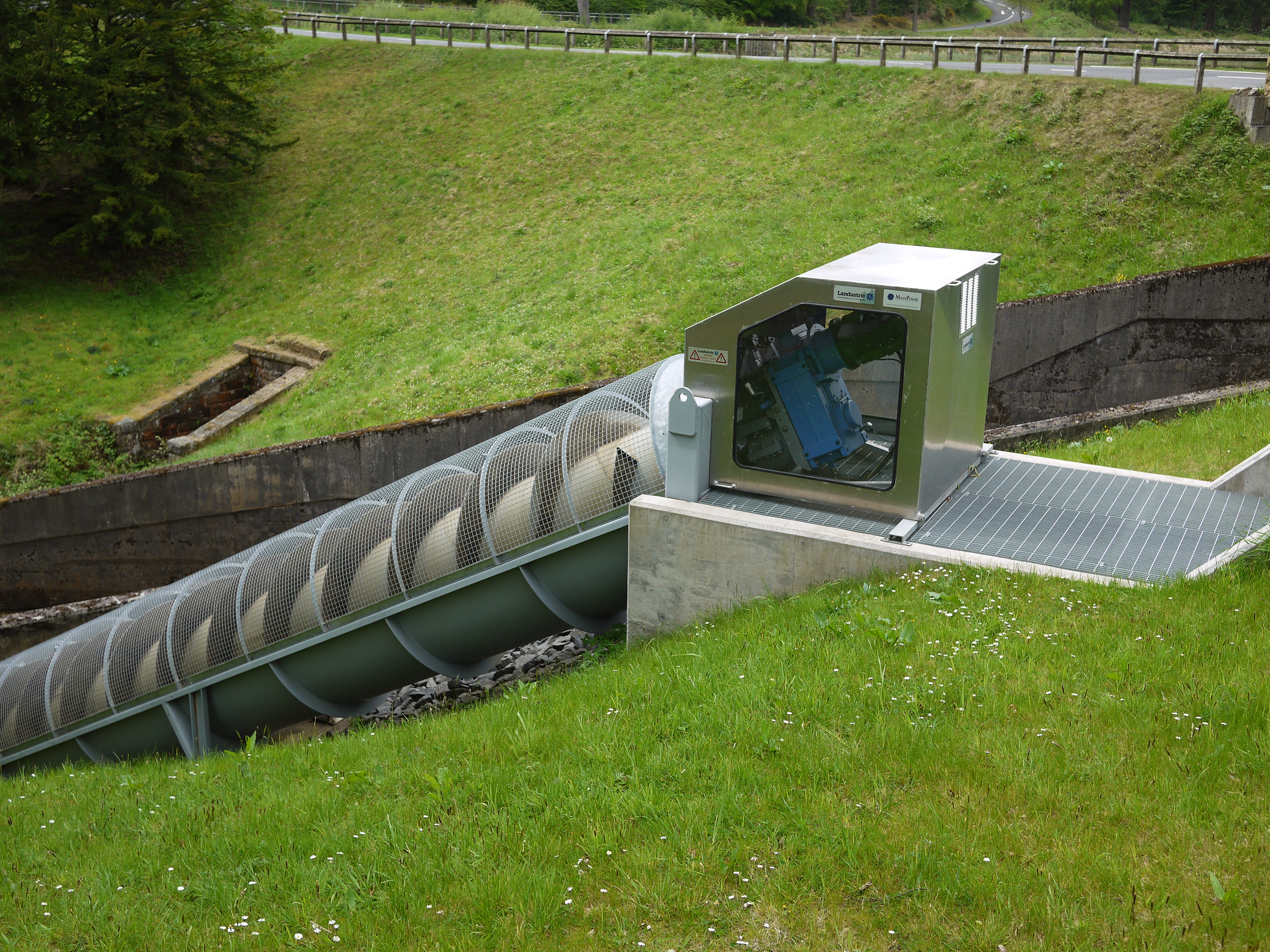
12 kW screw turbine at the Cragside estate

The Archimedean screw turbine is applied on rivers with a relatively low head (from 0.1 m to 10 m) and on low flows (0.01 m^{3}/s up to around 10 m^{3}/s on one turbine). Due to the construction and slow movement of the blades of the turbine, the turbine is considered to be friendly to aquatic wildlife. It is often labelled as "fish friendly". The Archimedean turbine may be used in situations where there is a stipulation for the preservation and care of the environment and wildlife.

== Design ==
An Archimedes Screw Turbine (AST) hydroelectricity powerplant can be considered as a system with three major components: a reservoir, a weir, and the AST (which is connected to the system by a control gate and trash rack). At most real AST locations, the incoming flow must be divided between the AST and a parallel weir. Typically, a minimum flow over the weir is mandated for the protection of the local environment. Other outlets as well as a fish ladder could be considered as the other components of this system. A comprehensive guide about the principles of designing Archimedes screw turbines and screw hydropower plants is available in "Archimedes Screw Turbines: A Sustainable Development Solution for Green and Renewable Energy Generation—A Review of Potential and Design Procedures".

=== Flow rate ===
To design Archimedes screw turbines and hydropower plants, it is essential to estimate the amount of water is passing through the screw turbine since the amount of power generated by an Archimedes screw turbine is proportional to the volume flow rate of water through it. The volume of water that enters an Archimedes screw turbine depends on the inlet water depth and the screw's rotation speed. To estimates the total flow rate passing through an Archimedes screw turbine for different rotation speeds (ω) and inlet water levels the following equation could be used:

$Q=\alpha Q_{Max} (A_E/A_{Max})^\beta (\omega/\omega_M)^\gamma$

Where $\alpha$, $\beta$ and $\gamma$ are constants related to the screw properties. Preliminary investigations suggest that $\alpha= 1.242$ , $\beta= 1.311$ , and $\gamma= 0.822$ give reasonable predictions of $Q$ for a wide range of small to full-scale AST sizes.

== Examples ==
United Kingdom

- Woolston, Cheshire weir on the River Mersey 486 kW, under construction
- Devon, Totnes 320 kW, commissioned December 2015
- Romney, Berkshire, 270 kW, installed to provide a renewable source of energy to Windsor Castle, Commissioned July 2013
- Bealey’s Weir, Radcliffe, 100 kW, commissioned May 2012
- Mapledurham Watermill, River Thames, the UK's largest flow capacity (8 m³/s) single screw, 99 kW.
- Buckfast, River Dart, screw turbine and fishpass, 84 kW
- UK’s first community owned hydro scheme, and fishpass, 63 kW at New Mills.
- UK’s first grid connected screw turbine, 50 kW at River Dart Country Park.
- Bainbridge, community owned screw turbine, 37 kW
- Tipton, River Otter, 30 kW
- Rochdale, screw turbine and fishpass, 20 kW
- Cragside, the birthplace of hydroelectricity, 12 kW
- Tillydrone, Aberdeen Community Energy, 100 kW, UK's first urban micro-hydro
- Morden Hall Park, River Wandle, south London, powering the attraction's visitor centre.

United States

- Hanover Pond on the Quinnipiac River in Meriden, Connecticut, 105 kW (or 920,000 kWh/year), grid connected, commissioned April, 2017; the first screw turbine installation in the US.
