= Old St Matthew's Church, Stalling Busk =

Ruined church in North Yorkshire, England

Coordinates: 54°16′21″N 2°07′48″W

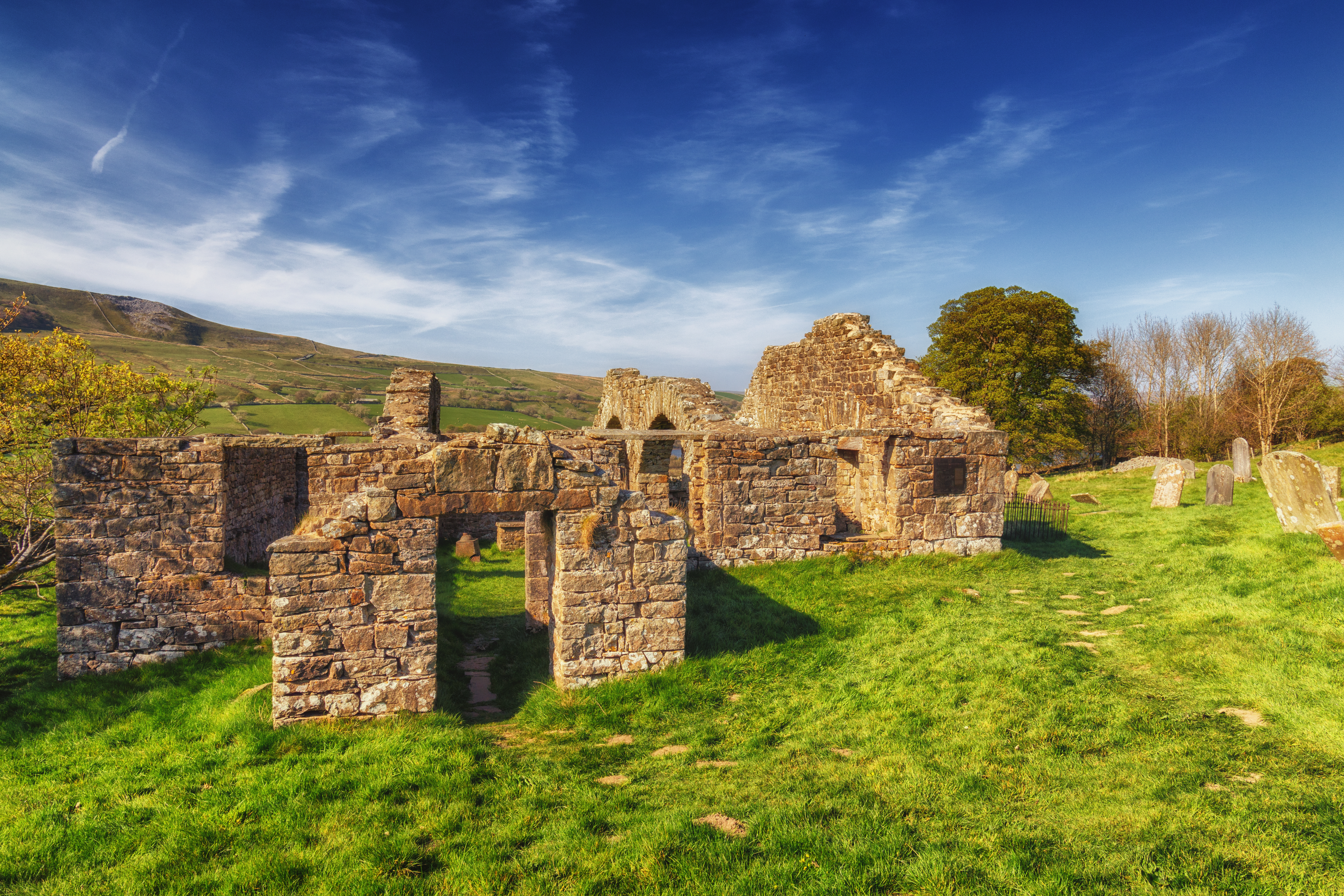
The ruined church, in 2019

Old St Matthew's Church is a former church in Stalling Busk, a village in North Yorkshire, in England.

The first church in Stalling Busk was built in 1603, but it fell into ruin during the English Civil War. A replacement was completed in 1722, with a nave and two aisles. Unusually, the altar was originally at the north end of the building, and the church was later rearranged to have the altar in the east aisle, and the pews, which dated from around 1800, placed so as to face the altar. The church originally had a low roof of stone slates, and a wooden bellcote at the west end, with a single bell. A south porch was added at a later date, with stone benches inside. Most of the windows were mullioned, while the west wall was blank. The northern east window may have been relocated from an earlier building.

In 1909, the new St Matthew's Church, Stalling Busk was completed. In 1913, the font, monuments and pulpit were moved to the new church, while the roof was sold, and the old church fell into ruin. However, the ruins were Grade II listed in 1986.

== See also ==
- Listed buildings in Bainbridge, North Yorkshire
