= Bainbridge Quaker Meeting House =

Quaker meeting house in Bainbridge, North Yorkshire, England

Coordinates: 54°18′33″N 2°06′08″W

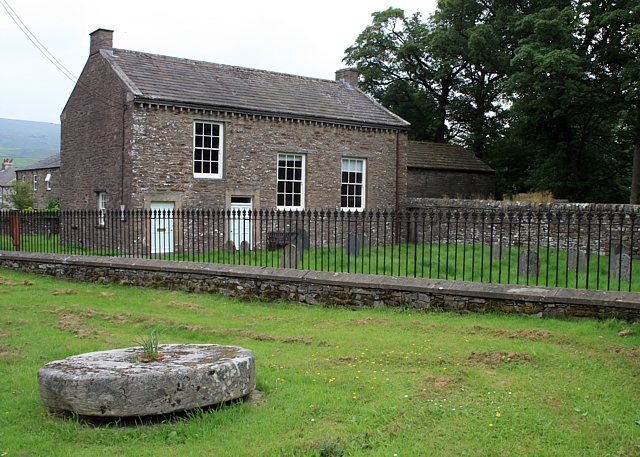
The building, in 2009

Bainbridge Quaker Meeting House is a historic building in Bainbridge, North Yorkshire, in England.

The first Quaker meetings in Bainbridge were at the house of Anne Coward then purchased by Elizabeth Routh and Dorothy Todd.In 1668, it was used as a dedicated meeting house. In 1672, a nearby plot was purchased for use as a burial ground. A replacement meeting house was constructed by 1700, which was sold to the Congregationalists in 1841, when the current meeting house was constructed, on the site of the burial ground. It was extended in 1896, to add a toilet. It was Grade II listed in 1986.

The single-storey building is built of rubble, with a stone slate roof. The main elevation is to the south, and has three unequal sash windows and two four-panelled doors: the western one leading to the gallery, and the eastern one, with a fanlight above, leading into a corridor. The west elevation has a single 12-pane sash window, and a blocked doorway, which originally led into a now-demolished building. The north elevation has a further window, and the single-storey extension.

Inside, the corridor separates the main meeting room, to the right, and the small meeting room, to the left, with the toilet at the end of the corridor. The main meeting room has original shutters and dado panelling, all in unpainted pine. At the east end is the elders' stand, up steps, with fixed benches on two levels. The small meeting room, originally for women, similarly has original shutters and dado panelling. The gallery, reached up a stone staircase, has a pine floor and stepped, fixed, benches.

== See also ==
- Listed buildings in Bainbridge, North Yorkshire
