= Virosidum =

Roman settlement in North Yorkshire, England

- Bainbridge Roman Fort; Virosidum
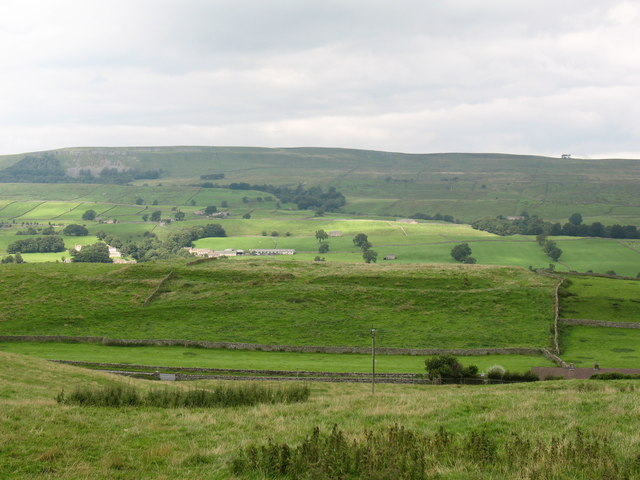

- Location within North Yorkshire
- 54.306°N 2.097°W
- Location: Bainbridge, North Yorkshire, England

History
- Founded: c. AD 90

Site notes
- Condition: Ruined

Virosidum was a Roman fort and settlement situated near to the modern town of Bainbridge, North Yorkshire, England. The site is a Scheduled monument.

== Location ==
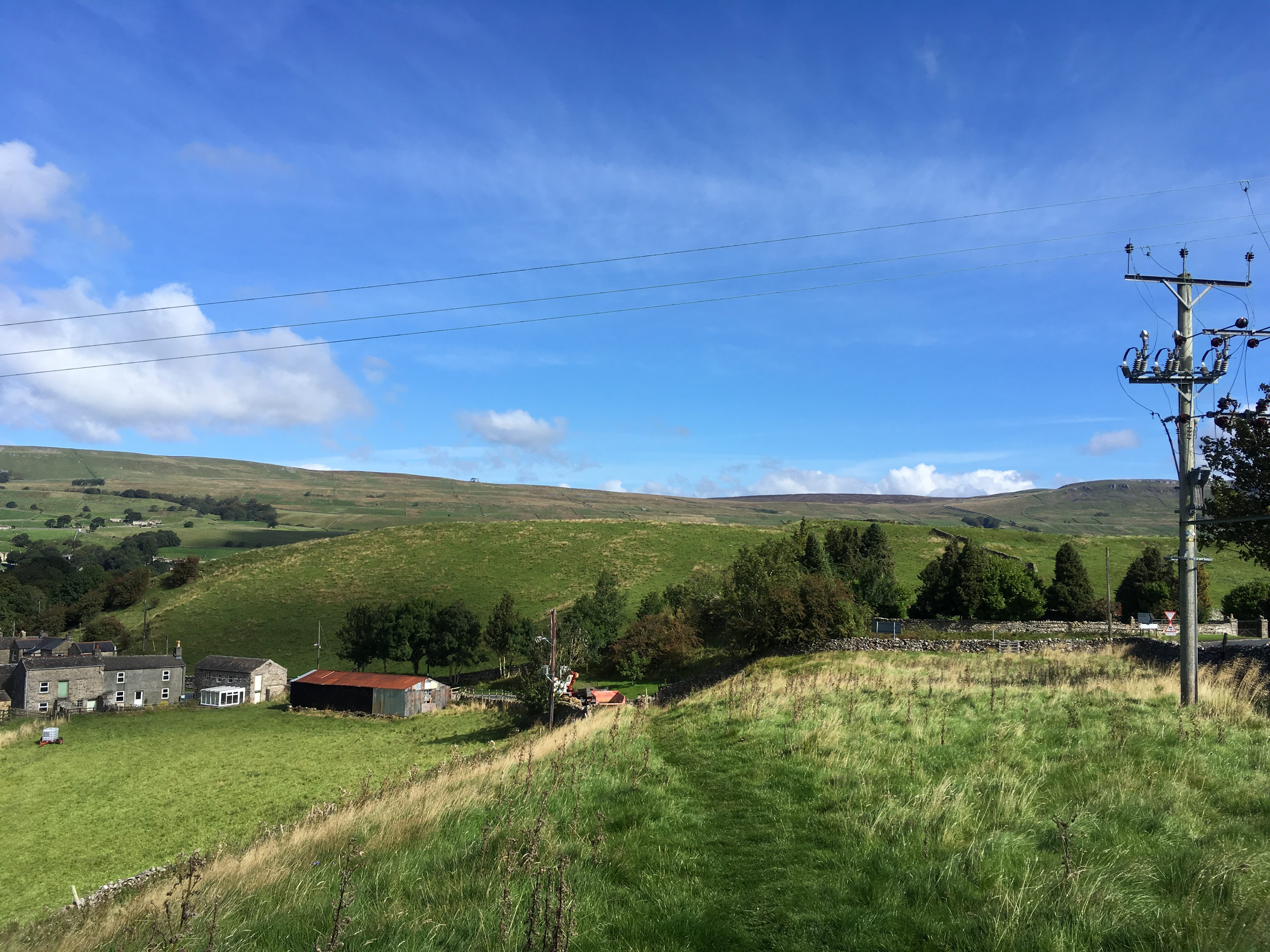
Virosidium was constructed on a plateau of high ground at the confluence of the River Bain and River Ure

The fort occupies a strategic position on the summit of Brough Hill, between the confluence of the River Bain and River Ure. It has views across Wensleydale and may have been placed to control a pass through the Pennines between Stainmore and the Ilkley/Aire gap.

== History ==
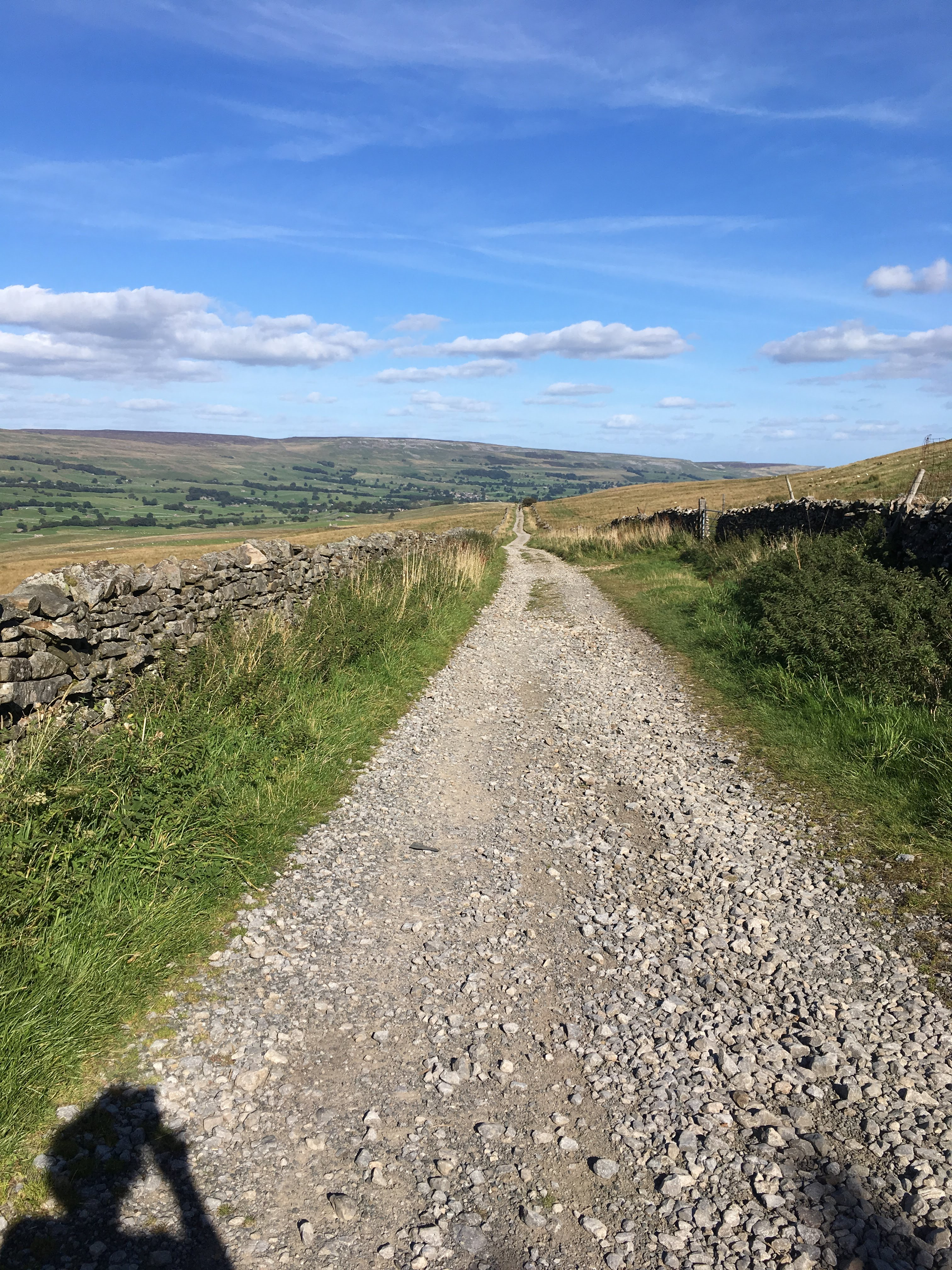
A roman road, known locally as Cam High Road, linked Virosidium with the Roman crossing at Ingleton

=== Roman occupation ===
While the fort may have had an earlier phase, the visible remains date to AD 90–105. It initially had an earth and timber rampart which was rebuilt in stone around AD 190.

The visible outline of the defences of the fort contains an area of 1.16 hectares (2.8 acres). The fort platform survives to a height of 3.9 m, and it is surrounded by a single ditch on the north, east and south sides, with a series of five ditches on the west. An annexe to the fort measures 99 m x 73 m.

The site was abandoned between c.120 and c.160. The fort interior was rebuilt in the early third century by the Cohors VI Nerviorum. Rebuilding across the whole site took place in the late fourth century, with pottery evidence suggesting a late abandonment.

=== Sub Roman Britain ===
Following the departure of the legions and the end of Roman rule in Britain in the early 5th century, there is no clear evidence that there was continued occupation at the fort. However, a pair of post-Roman burials were discovered in the principia (the headquarters building). One is of an adult aged 36–45 years old and the other of a woman aged 46+ years. Radiocarbon dating of the skeletal remains dated them to the ninth or tenth centuries AD. Isotope analysis of the strontium and oxygen values of their teeth found that the woman was probably local to the Yorkshire region, but that the other skeleton was from a western coastal part of Britain or continental Europe. These burials may be consistent with structural changes to the western wall of the principia and the aedes (a temple) that suggest it was used as a church.

== Archeological research ==
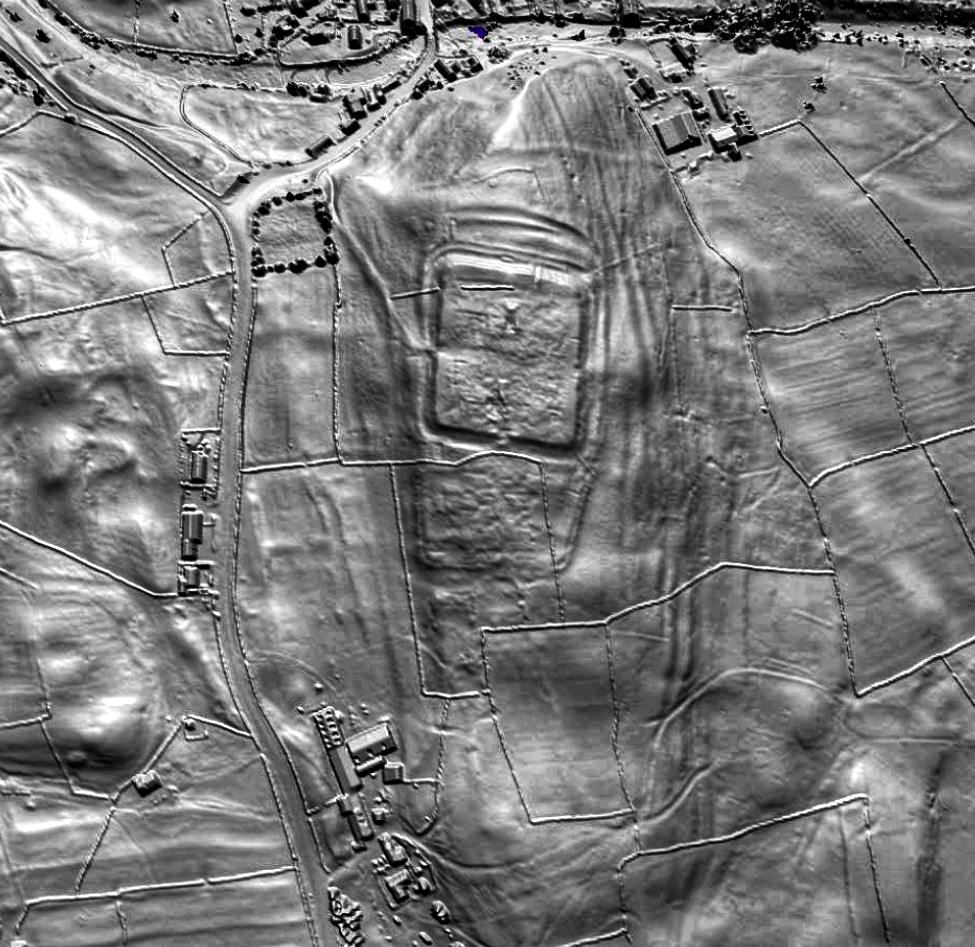
A lidar view of Virosidum Roman fort and vicus/annex

In William Camden's 1586 Britannia the fort is referred to under the name Bracchium and this name persisted in early editions of the Ordnance Survey maps. The fort was first excavated by John Kirk and R. G. Collingwood in 1925–6, then by John Percival Droop for Liverpool University in 1928-9 and 1931. Under lease to Leeds University, further excavations were directed by William V. Wade in 1950-3 and by Brian Hartley annually from 1956 to 1969.

Five individual inscriptions have been discovered from the fort; three of these were dedicated by the Cohors VI Nerviorum, and a further two are dedicated to individual units. The small finds from the 1956-1969 excavations and a small number of those from the 1920s excavations were deposited with the Yorkshire Museum (ID - YORYM: 2016.201). Two of the inscriptions are owned by the University of Leeds and in October 2022 they were placed on public display for the first time in the university's Michael Sadler building. The larger inscription records the reconstruction of four barrack blocks at the fort in AD 205 by the Prefect Lucius Vinicius Pius during the governorship of Gaius Valerius Pudens.
