= St Matthew's Church, Stalling Busk =

St Matthew’s Church, Stalling Busk
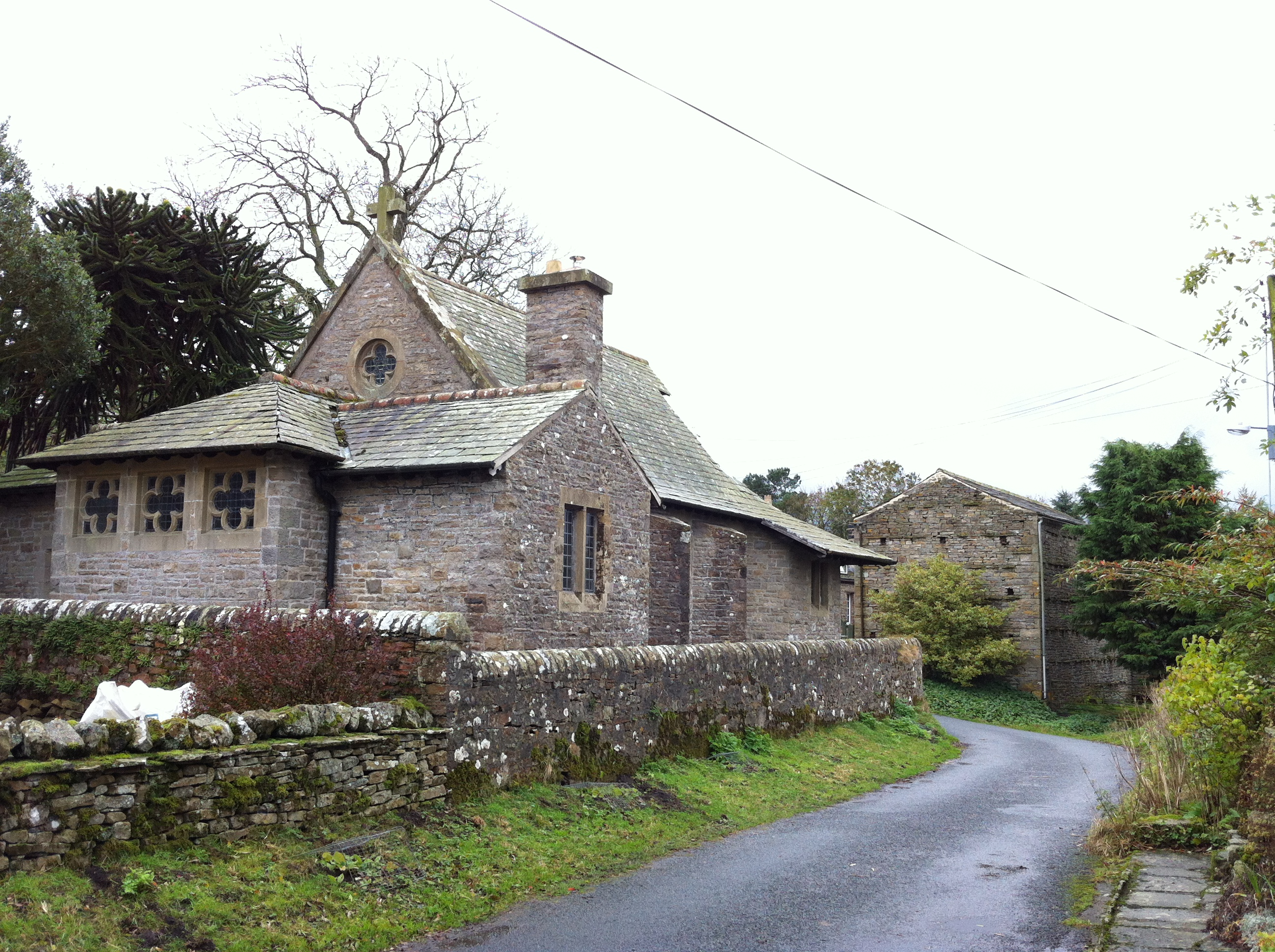
- St Matthew’s Church, Stalling Busk
- St Matthew’s Church, Stalling Busk
- 54°16′7.025″N 2°7′48.634″W
- OS grid reference: SD 91620 85892
- Location: Stalling Busk
- Country: England
- Denomination: Church of England
- Website: https://upperwensleydalechurch.org/st-matthews/

History
- Dedication: St Matthew

Architecture
- Heritage designation: Grade II listed
- Architect: Thomas Gerard Davidson
- Style: Arts and Crafts
- Groundbreaking: 1908
- Completed: October 1909
- Construction cost: £815 (equivalent to £83,875 in 2025)

Administration
- Diocese: Diocese of Leeds
- Archdeaconry: Richmond and Craven
- Deanery: Wensley
- Parish: Stalling Busk

St Matthew's Church, Stalling Busk is a Grade II listed parish church in the Church of England in Stalling Busk, North Yorkshire.

== History ==
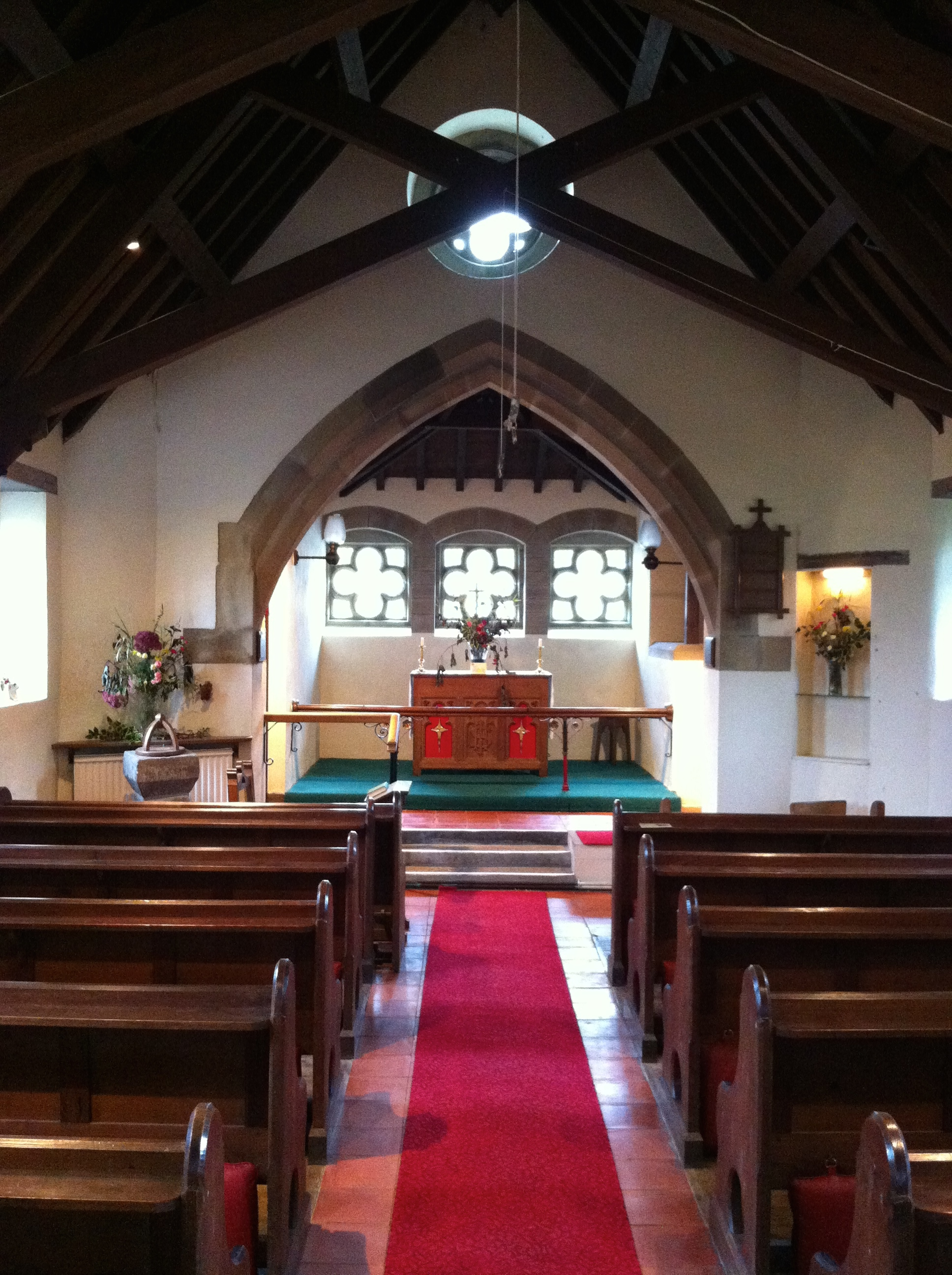
Nave and chancel

The church was commissioned by the Rev Frederick Squibb in 1906, to replace the seventeenth-century Old St Matthew's Church. Building work started in 1908 and the church was dedicated in October 1909. The architect was Thomas Gerard Davidson and the church is built in an Arts and Crafts style.

== Parish status ==
The church is in a joint parish with

- St Oswald's Church, Askrigg
- St Margaret's Church, Hawes
- St Mary and St John's Church, Hardraw

== See also ==
- Listed buildings in Bainbridge, North Yorkshire
