= Paper mills of Aberdeen =

Coordinates: 57.148970°N 2.097541°W

This is an article about the 3 main former paper mills in Aberdeen, Scotland.

== Donside Paper Mill ==
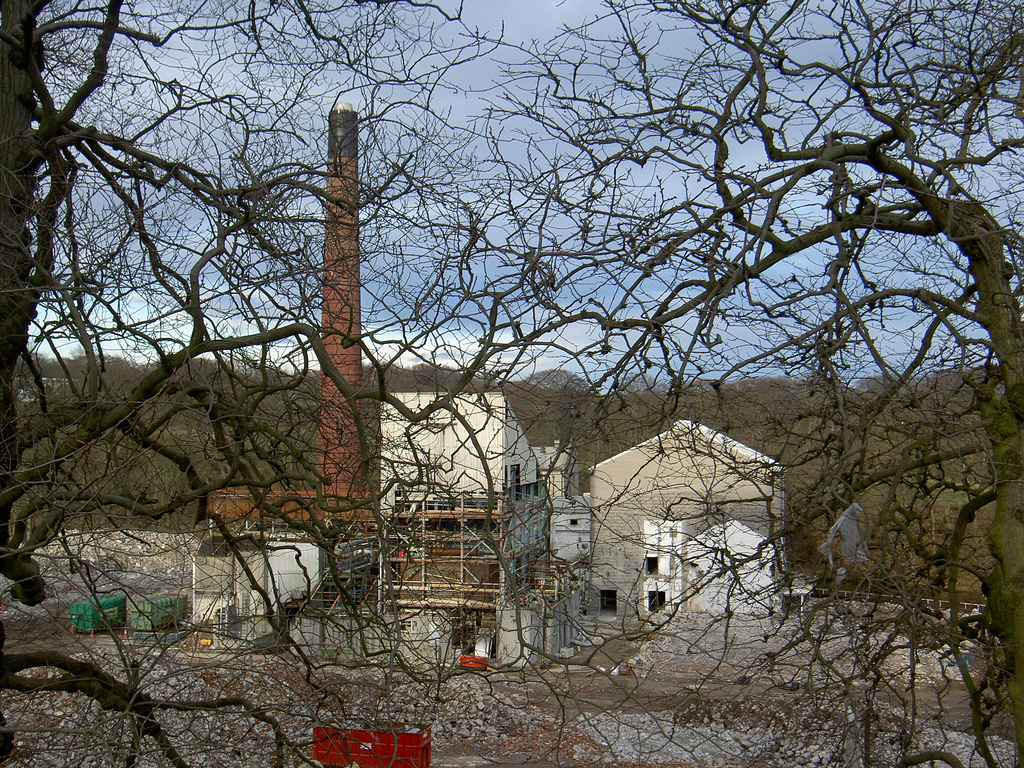
Donside Paper Mill under demolition, 15 February 2006

The Donside Paper Mill was paper mill in Aberdeen, shortly to the north of Old Aberdeen and the Tillydrone area, by the River Don. Since its closure in 2001 (with the loss of approximately 250 jobs), all the mill buildings have been cleared, and the site has been redeveloped as an "urban village"

The mill was developed to produce off-machine coated grades of paper. Principle grades were label (one sided coated), gloss art (two sided, single and double coated) and matt art (two sided single and double coated).

In 2016 a hydro electric turbine was installed on the site by Aberdeen Community Energy (www.acenegy.org.uk). The installation revealed an old lade which had previously delivered water to the paper mill.

== Davidson Mill ==
Davidson Mill was a paper mill in the Mugiemoss area of Aberdeen. It closed in June 2005.

== Stoneywood Paper Mill ==
Stoneywood Paper Mill was a paper mill in Aberdeen. It was established in 1710 by James Moir. It is now the only remaining paper mill on the river Don. After entering administration in January 2019, the Stoneywood Paper Mill survived after a management buyout by Creative Paper Holdings Ltd. in September 2019. However, in September 2022, it was announced that the mill has gone into the administration, making 301 out of 372 staff members redundant.. The closed mill was fire damaged in 2024, with demolition proposed
