= Raydale =

Valley in the Yorkshire Dales, England

Coordinates: 54.286°N 2.126°W

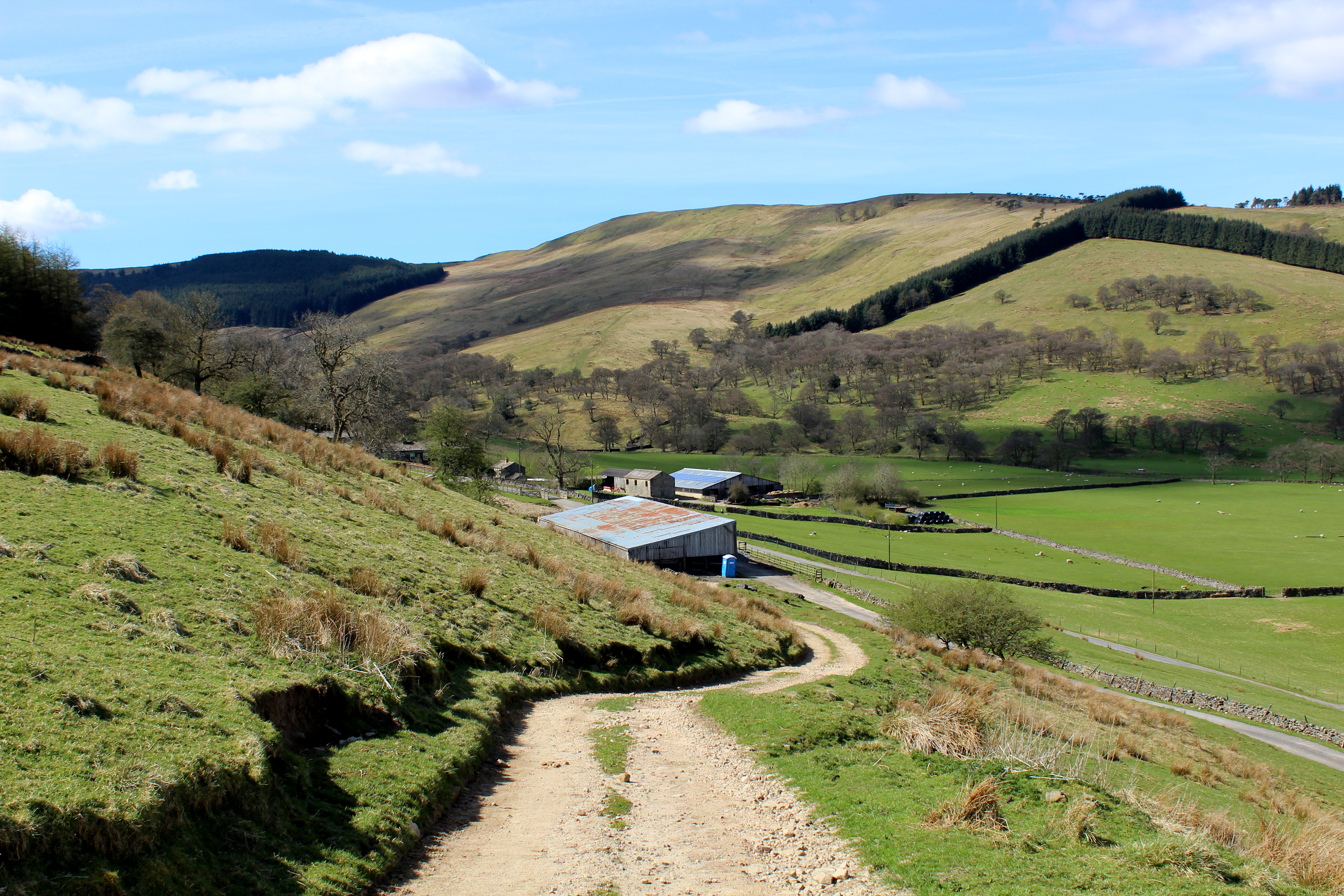
Raydale

Raydale (also known as Raydaleside) is a dale on the south side of Wensleydale in North Yorkshire, England. The northern part of the dale is the valley of the River Bain, which flows out of Semerwater, one of very few lakes in the Yorkshire Dales. Above the lake the dale is drained by smaller becks, and is joined by two smaller dales, Cragdale on the east and Bardale on the west.

There are three hamlets in the dale, Countersett, Marsett and Stalling Busk. The village of Bainbridge lies at the mouth of the dale.

The dale is a broad, flat-bottomed U-shaped valley, with a significant woodland cover around Semerwater and the other water courses.
