= Delnadamph Lodge =

Coordinates: 57.16075°N 3.28046°W

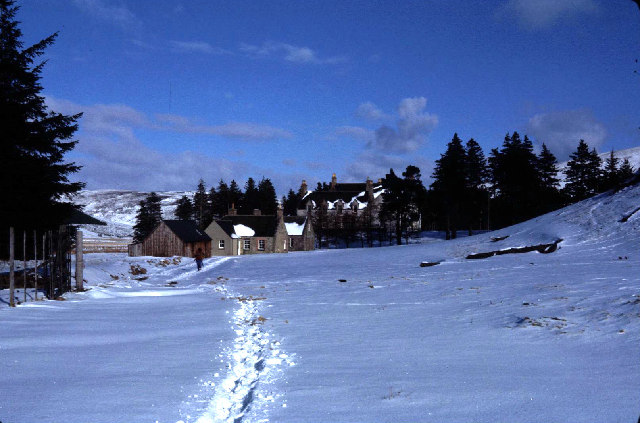
The lodge in 1985

Delnadamph Lodge was located on the Balmoral Estate about 8 miles (13 km) north of the castle. The lodge and its estate lands were bought by Queen Elizabeth II for a figure believed to be around £750,000 in 1978. The lodge was situated within a 6,700-acre (2,700 ha) estate located near the source of the River Don. The estate was bought because Balmoral did not have adequate grouse shooting. It was given by the Queen to her eldest son, Charles, Prince of Wales, and his first wife, Diana, on their marriage, but Diana found the home uninviting and was not interested in repairing it. The original house was described as a "solid two-storey Victorian ten-bedroomed lodge" in 1981. It was never occupied and was gutted by 1987, and subsequently offered to the Royal Engineers for demolition practice. The lodge was demolished in 1988 and only the offices remain.
