= Tillydrone =

Area of Aberdeen, Scotland

Coordinates: 57.1706°N 2.1156°W

Tillydrone: Scottish Gaelic: Tulach Droighne; Tilly
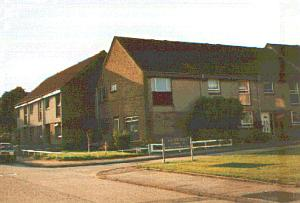
- Terraced low-rise ex-council housing in Tillydrone

- Location within the Aberdeen City council area Location within Scotland
- Population: 3,395
- OS grid reference: NJ931088
- Council area: Aberdeen City
- Lieutenancy area: Aberdeen
- Country: Scotland
- Sovereign state: United Kingdom
- Post town: ABERDEEN
- Postcode district: AB24
- Dialling code: 01224
- Police: Scotland
- Fire: Scottish
- Ambulance: Scottish
- UK Parliament: Aberdeen North
- Scottish Parliament: Aberdeen Central
- Website: aberdeencity.gov.uk

Tillydrone is an area of Aberdeen, Scotland. Lying north of the city centre and slightly north-west of Old Aberdeen, it is roughly bounded by the River Don, St Machar Drive, and the main Aberdeen-Inverness railway line.

The name is a corruption of the Scottish Gaelic "Tulach Droighne", meaning a knoll with thorn trees growing on it. The name is somewhat older than the housing estate which essentially comprises the area. It is colloquially referred to as Tilly. The estate was built as council housing and includes tower blocks and terraced tenement flats in addition to some low-rise terraced houses. As with most council housing stock in the United Kingdom, some of these properties have been purchased by their occupants. The proximity of the area to the University of Aberdeen results in some of the housing being rented to students.

The area has a number of shops and businesses including a pharmacy, a post office and an award winning butcher shop. There are also a school and care facilities for elderly people run by Aberdeen City Council. There is a Church of Scotland parish church - Saint George's Tillydrone Church - and the church building is regularly used for community meetings and by community groups such as the Girls' Brigade and Tillydrone Vision.

Between the main part of Tillydrone and the River Don is an extensive area of open and wooded land, which leads into the city's Seaton Park. At the edge of this, alongside Tillydrone Road, is the Wallace Tower, a turreted townhouse typical of pre-Georgian Aberdeen architecture which was moved stone by stone from its original city-centre location at the time of the construction of a Marks & Spencer shop next to the St. Nicholas Shopping Centre. Aberdeen Community Energy operate a 100kW hydro scheme on the site of the former Donside Papermill.

An Aberdeen City Council "blueprint" has earmarked the area for extensive redevelopment along with five other areas within Aberdeen.

The Diamond Bridge was constructed and opened in June 2016 over the River Don connecting the Tillydrone area with Bridge of Don.
