= Countersett Hall =

House in Bainbridge, North Yorkshire, England

Coordinates: 54°17′12″N 2°07′33″W

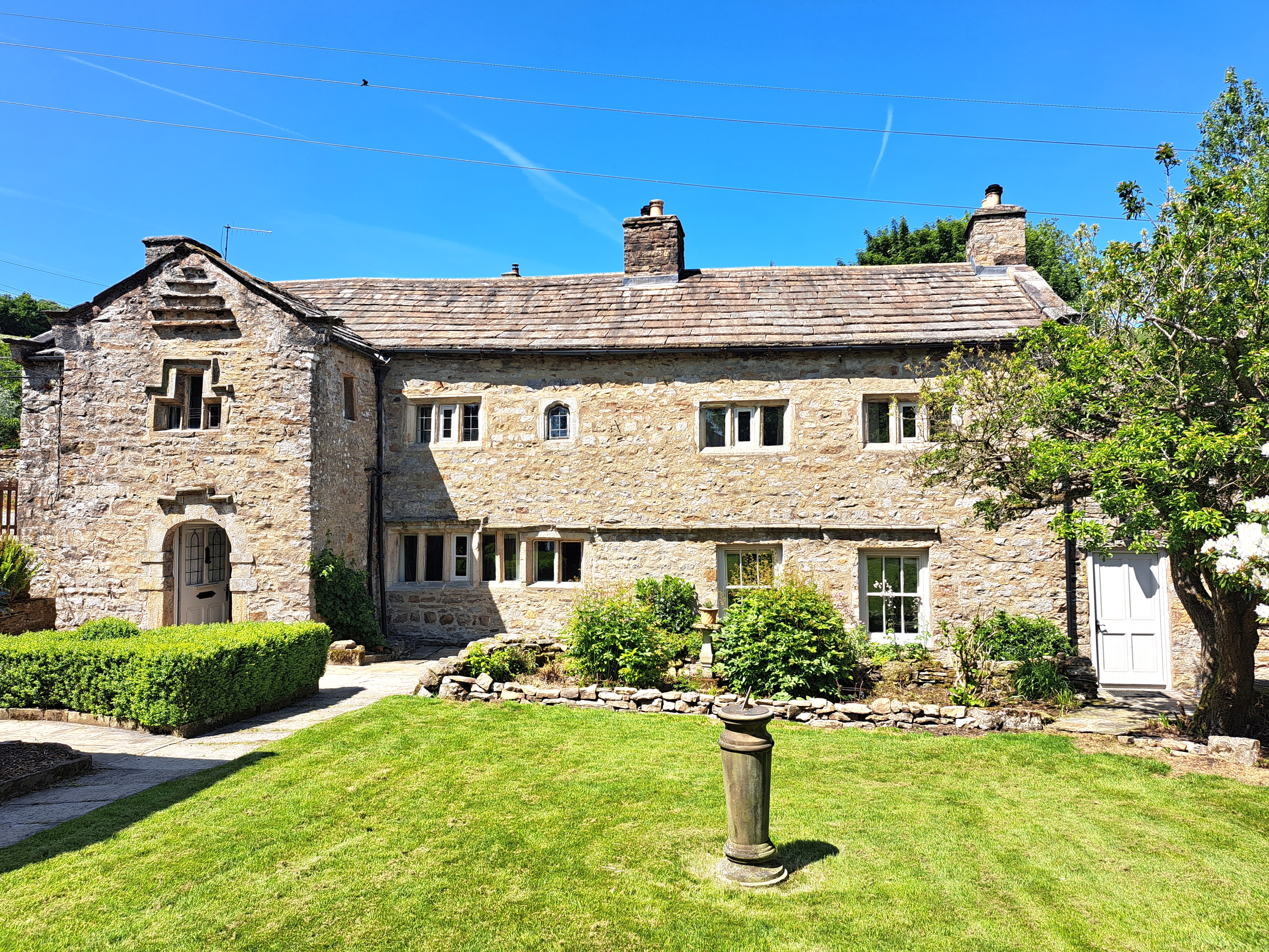
Countersett Hall

Countersett Hall is a Grade II* listed historic building in Countersett, a hamlet in North Yorkshire, in England.

The house dates back to the twelfth century in parts – artefacts were discovered during renovations in the 1980s. Richard Robinson purchased the freehold and extended the hall in 1650 – his initials are inscribed above the front door. Robinson became the first Quaker in Wensleydale and held meetings illegally in the house. George Fox stayed in the house in 1652 and again in 1677. There is a local legend that Mary Queen of Scots stayed at the hall on her way to Bolton Castle.

== See also ==
- Listed buildings in Bainbridge, North Yorkshire
