= Stalling Busk =

Hamlets in North Yorkshire, England

Coordinates: 54°16′07″N 2°07′49″W

- Location within North Yorkshire
- OS grid reference: SD917858
- Civil parish: Bainbridge
- Unitary authority: North Yorkshire
- Ceremonial county: North Yorkshire
- Region: Yorkshire and the Humber
- Country: England
- Sovereign state: United Kingdom
- Post town: Leyburn
- Postcode district: DL8
- Police: North Yorkshire
- Fire: North Yorkshire
- Ambulance: Yorkshire
- UK Parliament: Richmond and Northallerton

Stalling Busk is one of three settlements around Semer Water in the county of North Yorkshire in the small dale of Raydale just off from Wensleydale, England. The village lies to the immediate south of the lake, at 1,080 feet (330 m) above sea level. The name of the settlement derives from a combination of Old French (estalon) and Old Norse (buskr), which means the stallion's bush. The village was also known as Stallen Busk, and is commonly referred to by locals as just Busk. Although the village is not mentioned in the Domesday Book, archaeological evidence points to the area being inhabited during the Iron and Bronze ages.

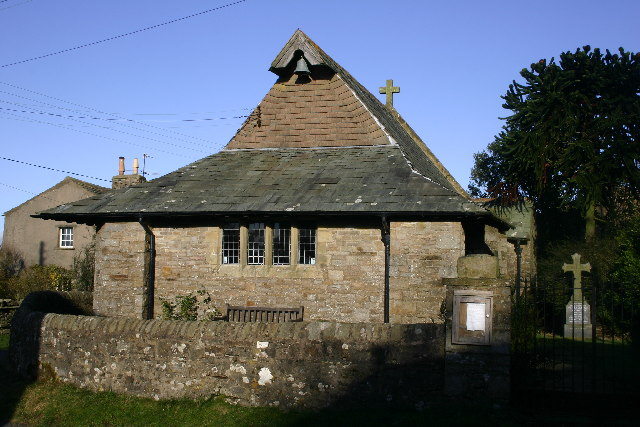
St Matthew's Church, Stalling Busk

As well as the Grade II listed St Matthew's Church, Stalling Busk has the ruined Old St Matthew's Church, that is also Grade II listed, which can be found on a short walk towards Semer Water. In St Matthew's Church graveyard, is a Commonwealth War Graves Commission burial plot. The village itself only consists of 17 buildings, with one of those being the church.

Historically the village was part of the Ancient Parish of Aysgarth, part of the wapentake of Hang West, in the North Riding of Yorkshire. By 1742, Stalling Busk had been made into its own civil parish with the other settlements in Raydale within its parish boundaries. In 1974, it was moved into the Bainbridge civil parish, in the newer county of North Yorkshire. From 1974 to 2023 it was part of the district of Richmondshire, it is now administered by the unitary North Yorkshire Council.

It is represented at Westminster as part of the Richmond and Northallerton constituency.
