= River Don, Aberdeenshire =

River in Aberdeenshire, Scotland

River Don
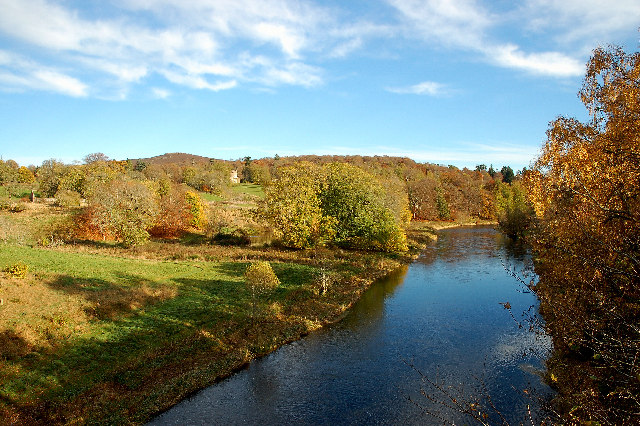
- River Don and Castle Forbes near Alford.

Location
- Country: Scotland
- County: Aberdeenshire

Physical characteristics
- Source
  - location: Ladder Hills
- Mouth
  - location: Bridge of Don, Aberdeen
  - coordinates: 57.1760°N 2.0770°W
- Length: 135 km (84 mi)
- Basin size: 1,312 km^{2} (507 sq mi)
- Discharge
  - location: Parkhill
  - average: 20.64 m^{3}/s (729 cu ft/s)

The River Don (Scottish Gaelic: Abhainn Dheathain) is a river in north-east Scotland. At 135 kilometres (84 mi) in length, it drains a catchment of 1,312 square kilometres (507 sq mi). It rises in the Grampians and flows eastwards, through Aberdeenshire, to the North Sea at Aberdeen. The Don passes through Alford, Kemnay, Inverurie, Kintore, and Dyce. Its main tributary, the River Ury, joins at Inverurie.

== Course of the river ==
The Don rises in the peat flat beneath Druim na Feithe, and in the shadow of Glen Avon, before flowing quietly past the ice-age moraine and down to Cock Bridge, below the picturesque site of the Delnadamph Lodge, demolished in 1988. Several streams, the Dhiver, Feith Bhait, Meoir Veannaich, Cock Burn and the Allt nan Aighean merge to form the headwaters of the Don. Water from the north of Brown Cow Hill (grid reference NJ230045) drains into the Don, while water from the west side runs into the River Spey and that from the south side into the Dee. The Don follows a circuitous route eastwards past Corgarff Castle, through Strathdon and the Howe of Alford before entering the North Sea at Bridge of Don, just north of Old Aberdeen.

The chief tributaries are Conrie Water, Ernan Water, Water of Carvie, Water of Nochty, Deskry Water, Water of Buchat, Kindy Burn, Bucks Burn, Mossat Burn, Leochel Burn and the River Ury.

== History ==
Near Kintore, not distant from the Don, is the Deers Den Roman Camp. In 1750 the Don's lower reaches were channelled towards the sea, moving its confluence with the sea northwards.

== Hydrology ==
Discharge of the River Don at various locations
Station	Start	Catchment Area	Mean Flow
Culfork	1997	103 km^{2} (40 mi^{2})	2.94 m^{3}/s (104 cu ft/s)
Alford	1973	499 km^{2} (193 mi^{2})	10.22 m^{3}/s (361 cu ft/s)
Haughton	1969	787 km^{2} (304 mi^{2})	14.33 m^{3}/s (506 cu ft/s)
Parkhill (Dyce)	1969	1,273 km^{2} (492 mi^{2})	20.64 m^{3}/s (729 cu ft/s)

River levels and flows have been measured along the course of the Don at a number of gauging stations since 1969. The lowest of these is the gauge at Parkhill near Dyce, with a mean flow of 20.64 cubic metres per second (729 cu ft/s). The station measures 97% of the total 1,312 square kilometres (507 sq mi) catchment of the river.

Prior to 2016 the maximum levels and flows were recorded during the floods of November 2002, with peak levels on the 22nd of that month reaching 5.07 metres (16.6 ft) at Haughton near Inverurie, and 4.17 metres (13.7 ft) at Parkhill. These were exceeded in January 2016 during the 2015–16 floods, when levels at Haughton reached 5.6 metres (18 ft), whilst those at Parkhill were over a metre higher than previously at 5.5 metres (18 ft). The resultant flooding forced residents along the river to evacuate their homes, in some cases with the help of local rescue teams. Areas affected included Port Elphinstone, Kintore, and Donside in Aberdeen where a number of residential care homes were evacuated as a precaution.

== Economy ==
Strathdon attracts visitors for salmon and trout fishing as well as its castles and scenery. A 100kW hydro scheme at Tillydrone is on the former site of the Donside Papermill.

== See also ==
- Aberdeenshire Canal
- Brig o' Balgownie
- Glenbuchat Castle
- List of rivers of Scotland
- Rivers and Fisheries Trusts of Scotland (RAFTS)
- List of navigation authorities in the United Kingdom
- List of waterway societies in the United Kingdom
