= River Bain, North Yorkshire =

River in North Yorkshire, England

River Bain
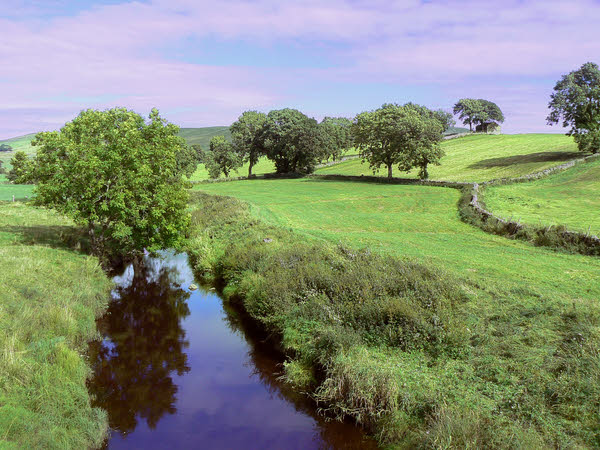
- River Bain near Countersett

Location
- Country: England

Physical characteristics
- Source
  - location: Semerwater
  - coordinates: 54°17′3″N 2°7′22″W
  - elevation: 252 metres (827 ft)
- Mouth
  - location: River Ure (at Bainbridge)
  - coordinates: 54°18′45″N 2°6′3″W
- Length: 3.95 km (2.45 mi)

The River Bain is a river in North Yorkshire, England. As a tributary of the River Ure, it is one of the shortest, named rivers in England. The river is home to the small scale hydroelectricity project River Bain Hydro located at Bainbridge.

== Course ==
The river leaves the second-largest natural lake in North Yorkshire, Semerwater, in a north-east direction past the hamlet of Countersett. After a couple of gentle meanders it runs through woodland before slowly turning northwards. It passes under the A684 road in Bainbridge and joins the River Ure to the east of Yore Bridge opposite the mouth of Grange Beck.

== Images ==
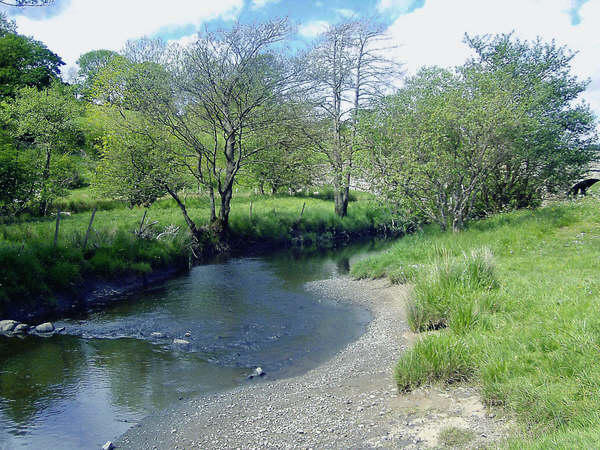
River Bain leaving Semerwater

== Sources ==
- Ordnance Survey Open View https://www.ordnancesurvey.co.uk/business-government/tools-support/open-data-support
