= Bainbridge, North Yorkshire =

Village and civil parish in North Yorkshire, England

Coordinates: 54°18′29″N 2°06′12″W

Bainbridge
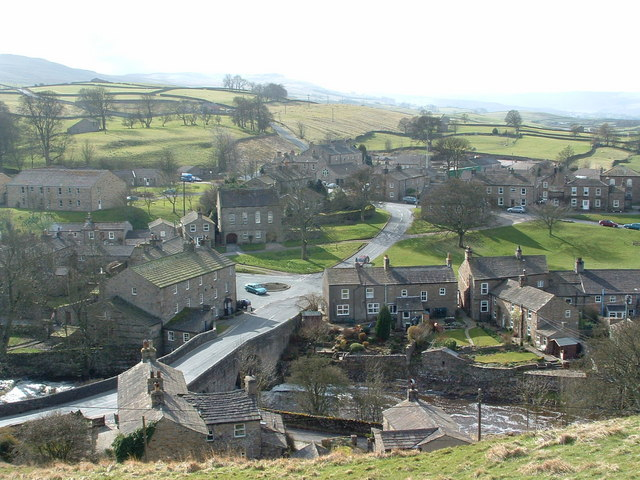

- Location within North Yorkshire
- Population: 480 (2011 census)
- OS grid reference: SD934904
- Civil parish: Bainbridge
- Unitary authority: North Yorkshire
- Ceremonial county: North Yorkshire
- Region: Yorkshire and the Humber
- Country: England
- Sovereign state: United Kingdom
- Post town: LEYBURN
- Postcode district: DL8
- Police: North Yorkshire
- Fire: North Yorkshire
- Ambulance: Yorkshire
- UK Parliament: Richmond and Northallerton

Bainbridge is a village and civil parish in North Yorkshire, England. The population of the civil parish at the 2011 census was 480. The village is situated in the Yorkshire Dales National Park, near the confluence of the River Bain (England's shortest river) with the River Ure. It is 27 1/2 miles (44 kilometres) west of Northallerton, the county town.

The civil parish includes the hamlets of Worton and Cubeck, to the east of the village, Raydale, and a large area of moorland to the south.

== History ==
The Roman name for Bainbridge was Virosidum and the remains of a Roman Fort are located just east of Bainbridge, on the other side of the river, on Brough Hill, where various Roman remains have been found. Early excavations included those directed by Brian Hartley in the 1950s and 1960s. These have been designated a Scheduled Ancient Monument. Nearby is Cam High Road, which follows the line of a Roman Road.

At the time of the Norman invasion there was no village, and hence no entry in the Domesday Book of 1086. The site of the modern town was at that time covered in forest and known as The Forest of Bainbridge, alluding to the bridge crossing both the Bain and Ure at this location. The lands after the Norman invasion were in the hands of Count Alan of Brittany.

Between 1146 and 1170, Conan, Earl of Richmond, granted the wardship of the forest to the lords of Middleham. They who built the manor and village of Bainbridge. Towards the end of the twelfth century, a dispute arose between the Abbot of Jervaulx and Ranulph, son of Robert Fitz Randolph, over the building of more houses in the village. Ranulph's argument was that the town existed before he became lord. Ralph, Earl of Chester, was requested to resolve the matter in 1229. Ranulph stated that "the town of Beyntbrigg belonged to his ancestors by service of keeping the forest, so that they might have abiding there 12 foresters, and that every forester should have there one dwelling-house and 9 acres of land." The lords of Middleham had not held the office of Forester since 1280, when Peter of Savoy, Earl of Richmond, had distributed land in the manor to tenants to hold. The manor was valued at more than a third of the revenue of the earldom at that time.

Bainbridge followed the descent of the manor of Richmond till 1413, when Henry IV granted the manor, town and bailiwick of Bainbridge to Ralph, Earl of Westmorland. The Neville family were also lords of Middleham at the time and followed its descent until 1628 when it was granted to the City of London. The City sold it in 1663 to eleven of the principal inhabitants, who held the manor in trust for the freeholders.

The village's only pub, the Rose and Crown, is reputed to be one of Yorkshire's oldest, having been in operation since 1445.

== Governance ==
The village lies within the Richmond and Northallerton UK Parliament constituency. From 1974 to 2023 it was part of the district of Richmondshire. It is now administered by the unitary North Yorkshire Council.The local Parish Council has five councillors including the Chair.

== Geography ==
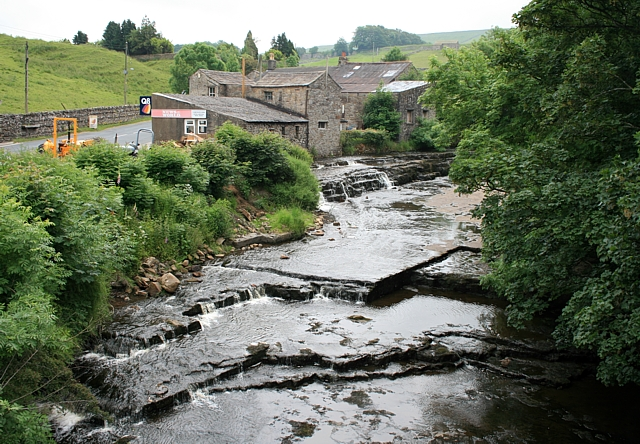
River Bain

The village is located on the A684 road, near the confluence of the River Bain with the River Ure. The River Bain is designated legally as a Main River, so at around two and a half miles long is reputed to be the shortest river in England.

The civil parish includes Raydale (the hamlets of Countersett, Marsett, Stalling Busk), the valley to the south of the village, and a large area of moorland around Raydale. There are several streams that feed the lake at Semer Water, which in turn is the start of the River Bain. Cragdale Water drains the land on Cragdale Moor, whilst Raydale Beck flows through a substantial wooded area and Bardale Beck drains the marshy area known as Fleet Moss. The highest point in the parish is the peak on Cragdale Moor between Middle Tongue Tarn and Hunters Hole at 2,110 feet (640 metres).

== Demography ==
Population
Year	1881	1891	1901	1911	1921	1931	1951	1961	2001	2011
Total	683	595	559	587	632	562	488	439	438	480

=== 2001 census ===
The 2001 UK census showed that the population was split 48.6% male to 51.4% female. The religious constituency was made of 76.7% Christian and the rest stating no religion or not stating at all. The ethnic make-up was 99.3% White British and 0.7% White Irish. There were 244 dwellings.

=== 2011 census ===
The 2011 UK census showed that the population was split 47.9% male to 52.1% female. The religious constituency was made of 74.2% Christian, 0.6% Buddhist, 0.4% Hindu and the rest stating no religion or not stating at all. The ethnic make-up was 95.2% White British, 3.5% White Other, 0.2% Mixed ethnic, 0.2% British Asian, 0.4% British Black and 0.4% Other Ethnic. There were 307 dwellings.

== Community and culture ==
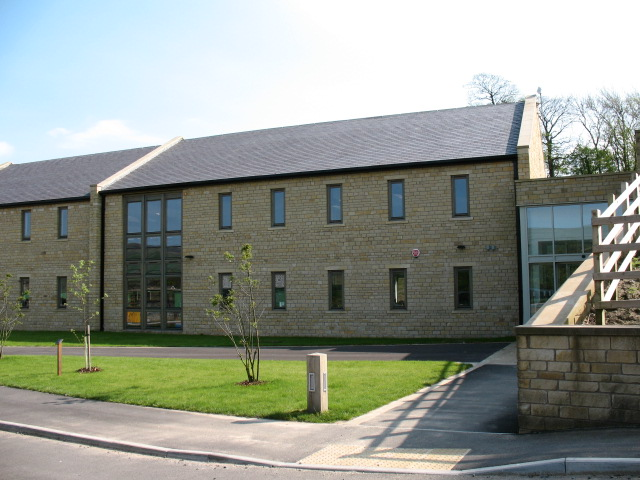
National Park Offices at Bainbridge

Bainbridge is served by a local inn (the Rose and Crown), a small village shop with post office and a local butcher. An equestrian centre offering riding lessons and local trekking can be found a short distance away at Gill Edge. There are a number of tea shop facilities for tourists.

Bainbridge Church of England Primary School provides primary education for the Parish. Pupils can receive secondary education at The Wensleydale School and Sixth Form in Leyburn.

The Yorkshire Dales National Park Authority has its headquarters in the village. The authority is an independent, public body within the local government structure, created by the Environment Act (1995). The authority's two main purposes are to protect and conserve the National Park and to help others share in and enjoy it. It employs around 120 staff.

A local custom in Bainbridge is the sounding of an ancient horn which was once used to guide foresters and travellers safely to the village from the surrounding Wensleydale forests. The horn is still located at the Rose and Crown public house and is sounded every night at 10 pm from the Feast of Holy Rood (27 September) to Shrove Tuesday.

== Religion ==
The parish had Wesleyan and Congregational chapels, built in 1836 and 1864 respectively. The former was in use as a Methodist chapel until 2017; the latter is now a house.

The Quaker Society of Friends has been present in Bainbridge since the 1600s. The present Bainbridge Quaker Meeting House was built in 1841 to replace a cottage bought in 1668. It is a Grade II listed building. The burial ground has been in use since 1672.

== Notable residents ==
- Leonard Wilson (1897–1970), a former Bishop of Birmingham, died in retirement in Bainbridge in 1970.
- John Fothergill (1712–1780), an English physician, plant collector, philanthropist and Quaker, was born at Carr End near the village.

== See also ==
- Listed buildings in Bainbridge, North Yorkshire
