= Local Energy Scotland =

- Founded: 2013
- Type: Consortium
- Location: Edinburgh, Scotland
- Region served: Scotland
- Owner: Energy Saving Trust
- Website: localenergy.scot

Local Energy Scotland is a consortium made up of the Energy Saving Trust (EST), Changeworks, The Energy Agency, SCARF, and The Wise Group.

Local Energy Scotland administers and manages the Scottish Government's Community and Renewable Energy Scheme (CARES) with support for delivery from Ricardo Energy & Environments.

The purpose of CARES is to support the development of locally owned renewable energy projects which provide wider community benefits.

Loan finance is available to cover the pre-planning consent (high risk) stage of project development, a high risk cost which is widely seen as a barrier to community groups and smaller businesses who would otherwise wish to develop a project.

The Scottish Government Register of Community Benefits from Renewables was relaunched on the Local Energy Scotland website on 5 March 2014 by Fergus Ewing MSP.

Local Energy Scotland has a network of development officers across Scotland.
