= Marsett =

Hamlets in North Yorkshire, England

Coordinates: 54.27173°N 2.14991°W

- Location within North Yorkshire
- OS grid reference: SD903862
- Civil parish: Bainbridge
- Unitary authority: North Yorkshire
- Ceremonial county: North Yorkshire
- Region: Yorkshire and the Humber
- Country: England
- Sovereign state: United Kingdom
- Post town: Leyburn
- Postcode district: DL8
- Police: North Yorkshire
- Fire: North Yorkshire
- Ambulance: Yorkshire
- UK Parliament: Richmond and Northallerton

Marsett is one of three settlements in around Semer Water in Raydale, a small side dale off Wensleydale in North Yorkshire, England. Marsett is only a hamlet and lies to the south-west of the lake, at a point where a smaller side dale, Bardale, joins Raydale.

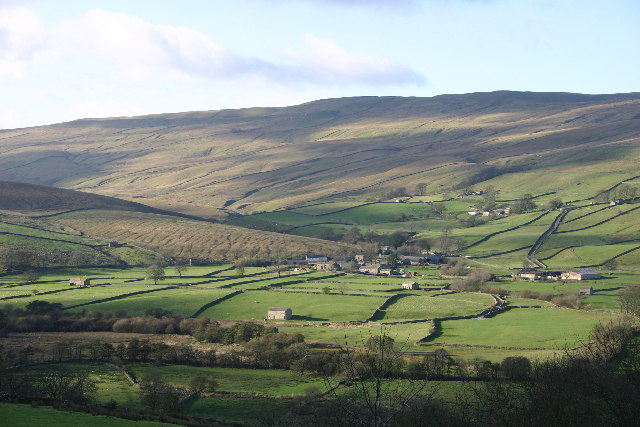
The village of Marsett, with Wether Fell in the distance, as seen from Stalling Busk.

The hamlet consists of two farms and ten permanent dwellings, together with a number of holiday cottages. There is also a Methodist chapel, built in 1897.

The name, first recorded in 1283 as Mouressate, is from the Old Norse Maures sætr, meaning 'the shieling of a man named Maurr' (a nickname meaning 'ant').

In 2016, Marsett's red telephone box was scheduled to be demolished, but following a successful campaign where local councillors pointed out that there is no mobile phone reception in the area, it was renovated instead. The phone box has also been earmarked as a possible location for a defibrillator unit.

From 1974 to 2023 it was part of the district of Richmondshire, it is now administered by the unitary North Yorkshire Council.
