= Countersett =

Settlement in North Yorkshire, England

Coordinates: 54°17′12″N 2°07′32″W

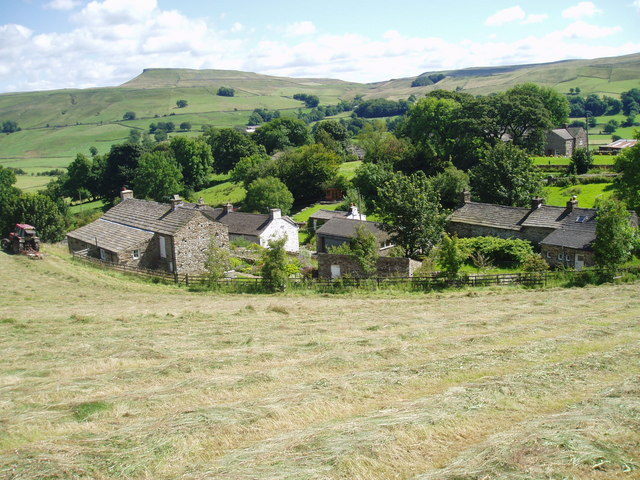
- Looking over Countersett to Raydale

- Location within North Yorkshire
- OS grid reference: SD919878
- Civil parish: Bainbridge
- Unitary authority: North Yorkshire
- Ceremonial county: North Yorkshire
- Region: Yorkshire and the Humber
- Country: England
- Sovereign state: United Kingdom
- Post town: Leyburn
- Postcode district: DL8
- Police: North Yorkshire
- Fire: North Yorkshire
- Ambulance: Yorkshire
- UK Parliament: Richmond and Northallerton

Countersett is the largest of the three settlements in Raydale, around Semerwater in the county of North Yorkshire, England. It is in the Yorkshire Dales to the north of the lake. The Boar East and West were once one farm, and before that a pub called The Boar Inn. The date 1667 was above the door, along with a Latin inscription which translated as "Now mine, once thine, but whose afterwards I do not know" (ref. Wensleydale, by Ella Pontefract, Dent & Sons, 1936)

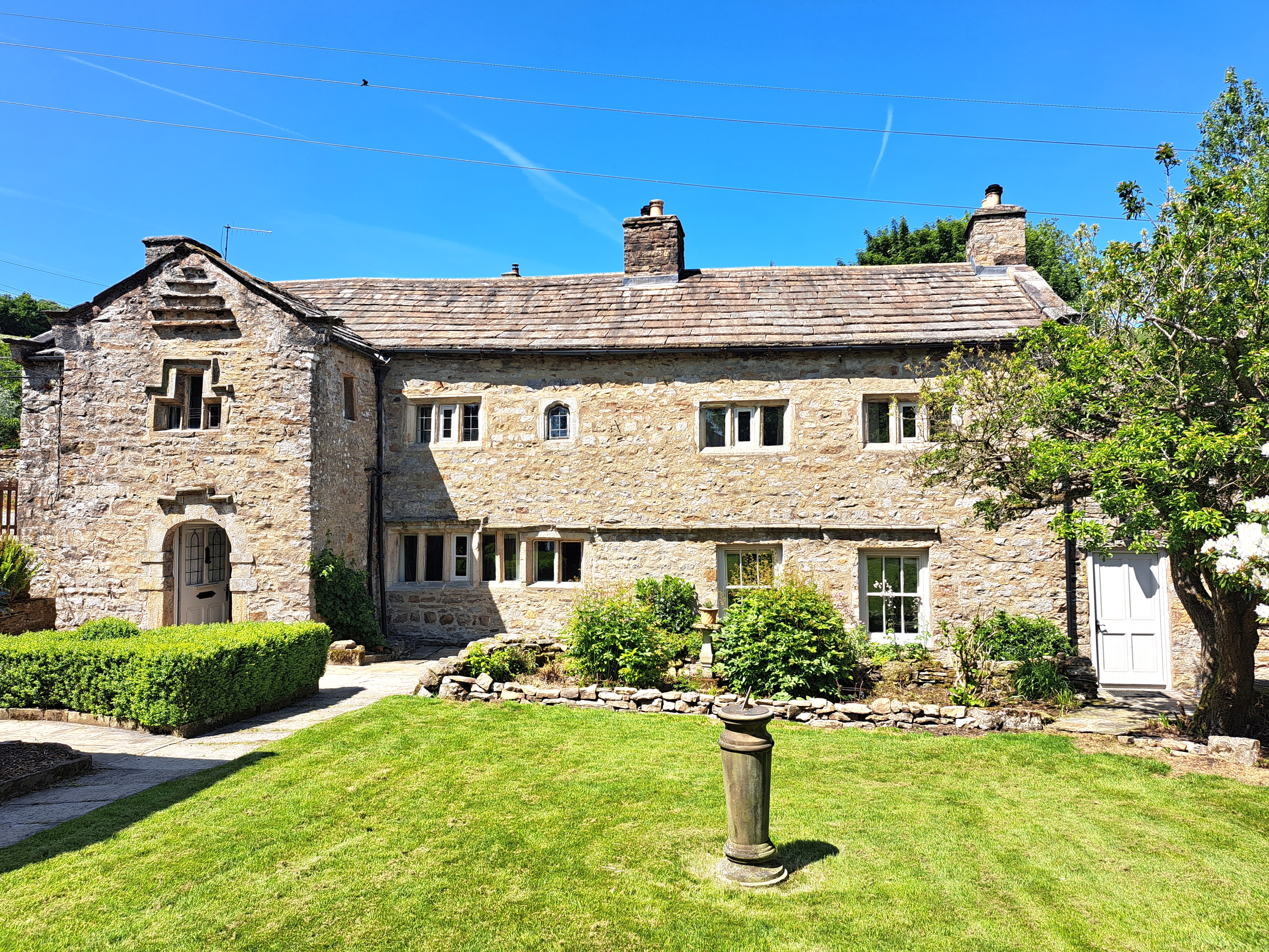
Countersett Hall

Countersett Hall dates back to the twelfth century. In 1650 Richard Robinson, the first Quaker in Wensleydale purchased the hall and extended it. It is a stone built Manor House with Richard Robinson's and his wife's initials and date of purchase, 1650, inscribed in stone above the front door. Illicit Quaker meetings were held in the Hall before the establishment of the nearby Meeting House. George Fox, a founder of the Society of Friends, stayed at Countersett Hall in 1652 and 1677. There is a local legend that Mary, Queen of Scots, stopped off at the hall on her way to Bolton Castle in 1558.

Countersett Quaker Meeting House was converted from an old barn in 1710 by Richard Robinson's son. A Quaker service is held there on the last Sunday of each month. The Meeting House is open to the public. On-foot access is via the signposted entrance by Chapel Farmhouse which is situated on the main road which runs through Countersett. The meeting house is grade II listed. During recent refurbishments, a kitchen and toilets were added.

From 1974 to 2023 it was part of the district of Richmondshire, it is now administered by the unitary North Yorkshire Council.

== Popular culture ==
Countersett was featured in the British television series All Creatures Great and Small, in the episode "Two of a Kind".
