= Semerwater =

Lake in North Yorkshire, England

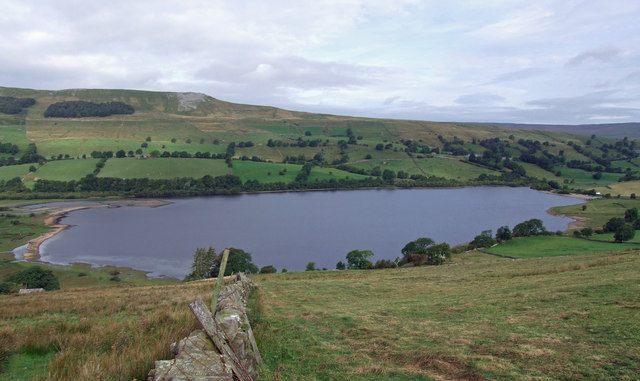
- Semerwater

- Location within North Yorkshire
- Location: Yorkshire Dales, England
- Coordinates: 54°16′50″N 2°7′30″W
- Basin countries: United Kingdom
- Max. length: 880 yards (800 m)
- Surface area: 71 acres (28.6 ha)
- Shore length^{1}: 1.4 miles (2.3 km)
- Surface elevation: 807 feet (246 m)
- ^{1} Shore length is not a well-defined measure.

Semerwater (/ˈsɛmər-/) is the second largest natural lake in North Yorkshire, England, after Malham Tarn. It is half a mile (800 m) long, covers 100 acres (0.40 km^{2}) and lies in Raydale, opposite the River Bain within Yorkshire Dales National Park. A private pay and display parking area is at the foot of the lake.

Semerwater attracts canoers, windsurfers, yachtsmen and fishermen. There are three small settlements nearby:

- Stalling Busk
- Countersett
- Marsett.

The Semerwater Stomp is an annual 16 kilometres (9.9 mi) run using part of the Dales Way and the footpaths leading down to the lake.

Semerwater was the subject of a number of sketches and paintings by the artist J. M. W. Turner.

Semerwater is a pleonastic place name. The name, first recorded in 1153, derives from the Old English elements sæ 'lake', mere 'lake' and water. The form "Lake Semerwater" introduces a fourth element with the same meaning: 'Lake LakeLakeLake'.

The lake is a Site of Special Scientific Interest, first notified in 1975.

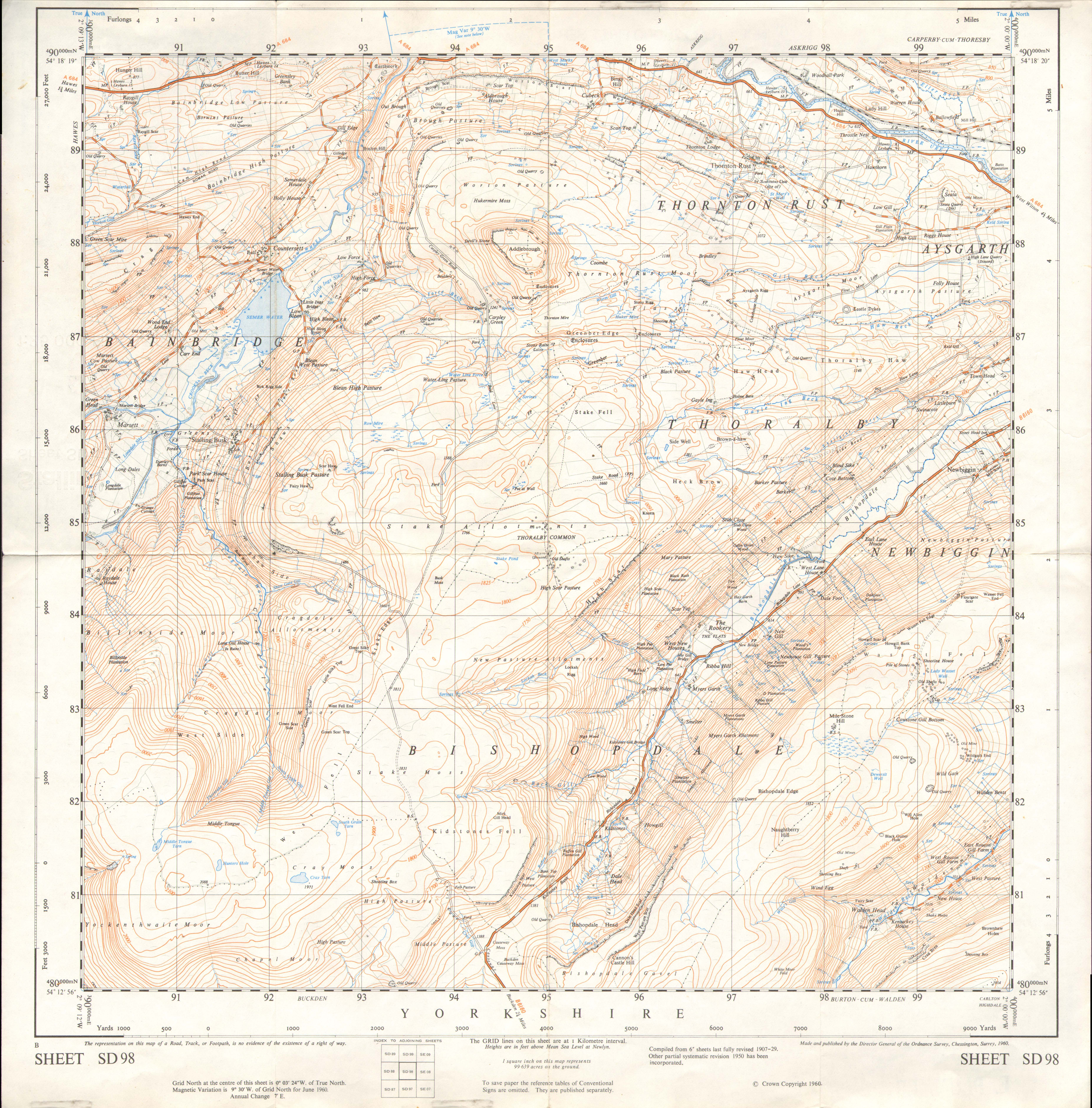
Semerwater and surrounding area shown on an OS map, 1960 (scale of 1:25,000)

== Legend ==
According to an old legend, Semerwater was once occupied by a prosperous city. One night an old man (or in some versions, an angel in disguise) came down to the city, in search of food and drink. He went from door to door, and at each house he was turned away. Finally, he came to the hovel of a poor couple just outside the town; the couple took him in and treated him with great kindness.

When the stranger was about to leave, he turned to face the town and uttered the curse:

Semerwater rise, and Semerwater sink,
And swallow the town all save this house,
Where they gave me food and drink.

An alternative version as told by locals:

Semerwater rise, Semerwater sink,
drown all the people In the village
except for this house which gave me meat.

And as soon as this was said, the waters of the lake rose up and flooded the village, drowning the proud inhabitants and leaving only the hovel of the poor couple on the hillside unscathed.

The legend was the subject of a poem, The Ballad of Semerwater, by Sir William Watson.

== Popular culture ==
Semerwater was featured in the British television series All Creatures Great and Small, in the episode "Female of the Species".

Semerwater is referenced in Sarah Moss's 2020 novel "Summerwater", the title of which stems from a character misremembering the name of the lake and the poem associated with it.
