= Worton, North Yorkshire =

Hamlet in North Yorkshire, England

Coordinates: 54.30567°N 2.06996°W

Worton
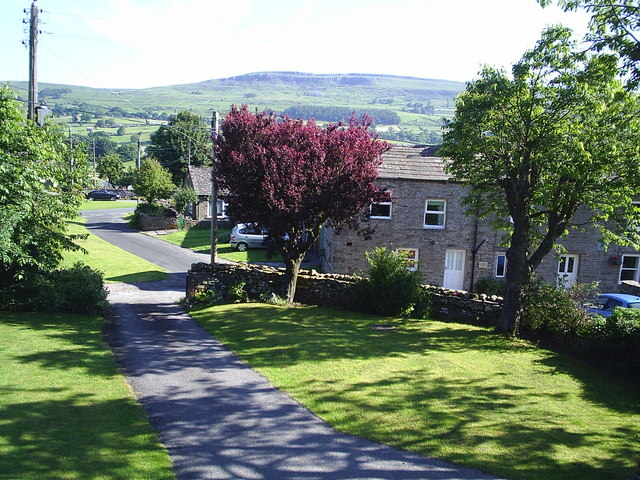
- Worton

- Location within North Yorkshire
- OS grid reference: SD 955 900
- Civil parish: Bainbridge
- Unitary authority: North Yorkshire
- Ceremonial county: North Yorkshire
- Region: Yorkshire and the Humber
- Country: England
- Sovereign state: United Kingdom
- Police: North Yorkshire
- Fire: North Yorkshire
- Ambulance: Yorkshire

Worton is a hamlet in Wensleydale in the Yorkshire Dales part of the county of North Yorkshire, England. It lies 1-mile (1.6 km) east of Bainbridge on the A684 road, 4 miles (6.4 km) west of Aysgarth and 1-mile (1.6 km) south east of Askrigg. The hamlet is just south of the River Ure, the biggest river in Wensleydale. The hamlet is named in Domesday Book. Its name derives from the Old English wyrt-tūn and means the (herb or vegetable) garden.

From 1974 to 2023 it was part of the district of Richmondshire and it is now administered by the unitary North Yorkshire Council.

There are a number of listed buildings in the hamlet, including Worton Hall and the Victoria Arms public house, which had one of the longest-serving landlords in British pub history. Ralph Daykin was the publican at the Victoria Arms between 1956 and 2013.
