= Ella Pontefract =

British social historian (1896–1945)

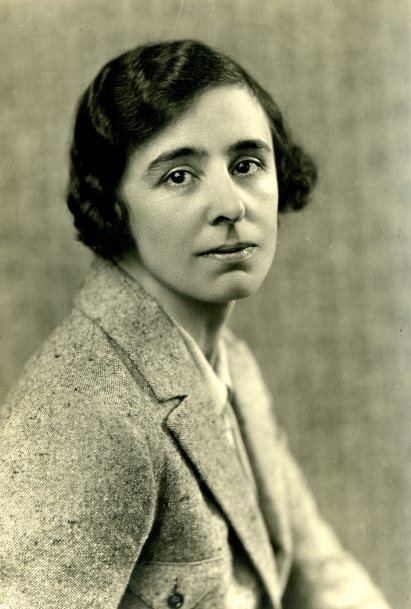
- Born: 1896
- Died: 23 February 1945 (aged 48–49)
- Occupation: Author
- Known for: Books on the Yorkshire Dales

Ella Pontefract (1896 – 23 February 1945) was the writer of six books on the social history of the Yorkshire Dales related to disappearing rural traditions.

Pontefract and her partner Marie Hartley developed a rigorous transcription method for recording Yorkshire dialect, and vocabulary including the subtle distinctions between adjacent valleys. They showed great enthusiasm for the skills, crafts and the work in the Dales.

== Early days ==
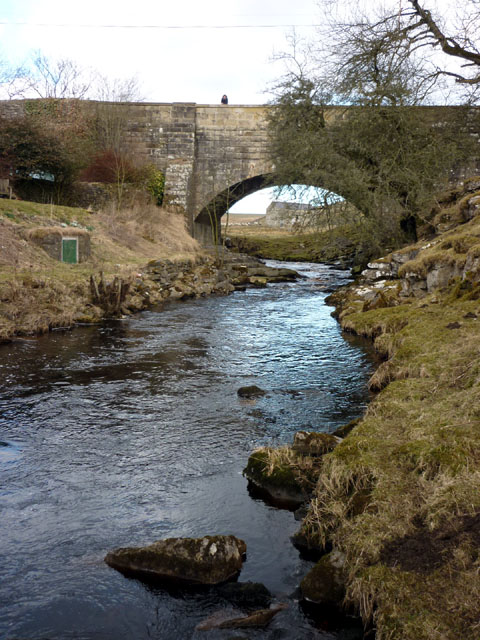
Ella recorded the oral history of places like Dibbles Bridge in Wharfedale.

Pontefract was born in the textile valleys of Yorkshire into prosperous families of Huddersfield and Penistone district. Her father's family had been manufacturers and yeomen farmers, her mother's grandfather the founder of Haig textile machinery manufacturers. The family were Liberal politics and members of the nonconformist Chapel. Pontefract attended Wheelwright Grammar School for Girls in Dewsbury, then Highfield Prep School in Harrogate. In 1912 the parents moved the family moved up to Lindley Moor between Huddersfield and Halifax, but the postwar slump of 1925 necessitated they move to Wetherby. Pontefract had her first breakdown due to high blood pressure and spent over a year in forced inactivity. Her neighbour's daughter Marie Hartley, although nine years younger, became her inseparable lifelong friend. In 1927 they started walking tours, with friends, of the Yorkshire Dales. Pontefract kept journals whist Marie painted and drew landscapes.

== Careers ==
Pontefract wanted to write professionally, so when in 1931 Marie won a place to study art at the Slade School in London, Pontefract went too. Pontefract attended classes at University College and took private tuition in journalism. On their return to Yorkshire they settled back with their respective parents but resolved to set up a partnership to produce books on the Dales and Yorkshire.

== Success ==
In 1932 their success started with "The Charm of Yorkshire Churches" illustrated articles published in the Yorkshire Weekly Post of Leeds 1932–1936. They travelled to every church and produced a feature a week for three-and-a-half years. These were later republished c.1937 as a 199-page hardback book of the same name by the Yorkshire Weekly Post.

In 1932 was published Pontefract's first article in The Countryman. The following year, Ernest E. Taylor, advised them and presented their first book to J. M. Dent, who agreed to publish. This was followed by five more books on the life and customs of the Yorkshire Dales. Hartley's curiosity also took them on several tours of the rest of Yorkshire where they got on just as well with steelworkers, deep-sea fishermen and textile weavers. In 1934 they bought a car and caravan trailer to camp onsite for their studies for succeeding books.

In 1939, when the Yorkshire Dalesman was founded by Harry Scott they contributed to its early numbers and helped to establish it.

== Quotations ==
"She loved people and was the best listener I have ever met" Joan Ingilby.

Pontefract had "great strength of mind and independence of thought. In the villages she was deeply loved for her infinite kindness and abiding affection for the stone villages." David Brooks, The Yorkshire Post 1945.

== Book list ==
Books by Ella Pontefract and Marie Hartley
Title	Illustration	Binding	Pages	Date	Publisher	ISBN
Swaledale	woodcuts, photos	Hardcover	174	1934	J. M. Dent & Sons	—
"	"	Paperback	233	1988	Smith Settle Publishing	978-1-870071-19-2
Wensleydale	woodcuts, photos	Hardcover	244	1936	J. M. Dent & Sons	—
"	"	Hardcover	75	1988	Littlehampton Book Servs	978-0-460-03617-7
"	"	Paperback	229	1989	Smith Settle Publishing	978-1-870071-20-8
The Charm of Yorkshire Churches	pen and ink	Hardcover	199	1937	Yorkshire Weekly Post	—
Wharfedale	woodcuts, photos	Hardcover	229	1938	J. M. Dent & Sons	—
"	"	Paperback	229	1988	Smith Settle Publishing	978-1-870071-20-8
"	"	Paperback	229	1992	Dalesman Publishing	978-1-870071-21-5
Yorkshire Tour	pen ink, photos	Hardcover	336	1939	J. M. Dent & Sons	978-0-460-03616-0
"	"	Paperback	336	2002	Dalesman Publishing	978-1-85825-182-0
Yorkshire Cottage	pen and ink	Hardcover	158	1947	J. M. Dent & Sons	—
"	"	Hardcover	176	1978	Littlehampton Book Servs	978-0-460-04340-3
"	"	Paperback	176	1984	Dalesman Publishing	978-0-85206-801-4

== Collecting ==
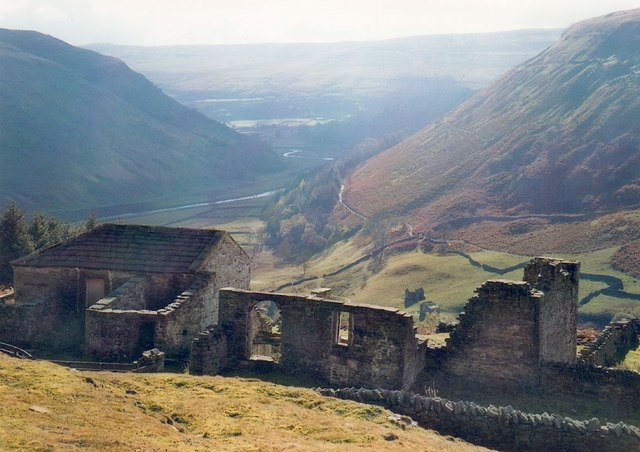
Ella wrote of Alice, a 'wild' 4-year-old child living here at Crackpot Hall overlooking Swaledale.

When war broke out they still lived with their parents and served at the Ambulance Depot in Wetherby. But in 1941, when a sister took over nursing their mother, Pontefract and Marie moved into the 17th-century cottage they had been having restored up in Wensleydale at Askrigg. When they travelled collecting stories they also recorded in detail every item they collected on their visits to markets, auctions and house sales, describing the exact context of their use. These items of personal, domestic and working life in the Dales were used by Marie for her woodcuts and drawings. When others heard of this they donated more.

In 1941 "Mr Horne's Museum" was put up for auction. This museum in Leyburn had been in existence for over a hundred years. On 5 November they bought thirteen lots from the sale, the core of the collection. Their collection was a substantial basis for the Dales Countryside Museum at Hawes, Wensleydale.

== Death and legacy ==
"Ella Pontefract struggled long with ill health. Though in those later years very frail she was no trembler." David Brooks, The Yorkshire Post, 1945. After a year of illness she died 23 February 1945. After some time Marie Hartley wrote "Yorkshire Heritage" a devoted memoir including many of Ella's later diary notes. It was published in 1950. Pontefract's artwork has been highly acclaimed and exhibited.
