= Marie Hartley =

British social history writer and illustrator (1905–2006)

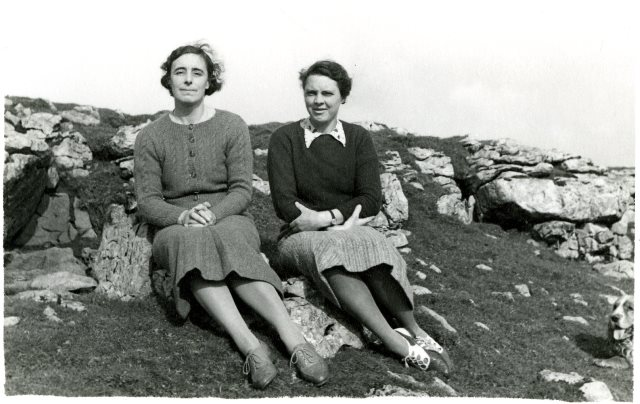
- Ella Pontefract and Marie Hartley
- Born: 29 September 1905
- Died: 10 May 2006 (aged 100)
- Occupation: Author
- Known for: Writer, illustrator, painter and historian

Marie Hartley MBE (29 September 1905 – 10 May 2006) was writer or co-writer and illustrator of some 40 books on the social history of the Yorkshire Dales.

== Life ==
Hartley was born into a prosperous family of wool merchants at Morley, near Leeds. She attended Leeds College of Art and then the Slade School in London, where she specialised in wood engraving. On her return to Yorkshire she settled in the market town of Wetherby. During the 1930s and 1940s she set up in partnership with a local writer, Ella Pontefract, illustrating books on the Dales and Yorkshire. The two women published six books on Yorkshire life and customs before Pontefract died in 1945. Subsequently, Marie Hartley was joined by Joan Ingilby. Marie Hartley spent 75 years gathering material which related to disappearing rural traditions of Yorkshire. The women travelled across the county collecting stories, written material and artefacts, all of which they brought back to the 17th-century cottage they shared at Askrigg in Wensleydale. In the early 1970s they donated their collection to the former North Riding of Yorkshire County Council. In 1979 this gift formed the basis of the collection now housed in the Dales Countryside Museum at Hawes.

They wrote the "groundbreaking" Life and Traditions in the Yorkshire Dales (1968), and The Old Hand Knitters of the Dales (1951) which showed how important knitting is. These two are considered to be classics. The archive of their documents and photographs remains in the care of the Yorkshire Archaeological Society, whose Silver Medal they won in 1993. Both were appointed MBE in 1997, and in 1999 received honorary degrees from the Open University. Ingilby died in 2000 aged 89.

== Works ==
Works by or about Marie Hartley with Ella Pontefract and Joan Ingilby

Title	Date	Publisher
Swaledale by Ella Pontefract and Marie Hartley	1934	J.M. Dent & Sons
Wensleydale by Ella Pontefract and Marie; Hartley.	1936	J.M. Dent & Sons
The Charm of Yorkshire Churches by Ella; Pontefract, sketches by Marie Hartley.	1936	The Yorkshire Post
Wharfedale by Ella Pontefract and Marie; Hartley.	1938	J.M.Dent & Sons
Yorkshire Tour by Ella Pontefract and Marie; Hartley.	1939	J.M. Dent & Sons
Yorkshire Cottage by Ella Pontefract and Marie Hartley.	1942	J.M. Dent & Sons
Yorkshire Heritage, A Memoir to Ella; Pontefract, written and illustrated by Marie; Hartley.	1950	J.M. Dent & Sons
The Old Hand Knitters of the Dales by Marie; Hartley and Joan Ingilby.	1951	The Dalesman
Yorkshire Village by Marie Hartley and Joan; Ingilby.	1952	J.M. Dent & Sons
The Yorkshire Dales by Marie Hartley and Joan Ingilby.	1956	J.M. Dent & Sons
The Wonders of Yorkshire by Marie Hartley and Joan Ingilby.	1959	J.M. Dent & Sons
Yorkshire Portraits by Marie Hartley and Joan; Ingilby.	1961	J.M. Dent & Sons
Getting to Know Yorkshire by Marie Hartley and Joan Ingilby.	1963	J.M. Dent & Sons
Life and Tradition in the Yorkshire Dales by Marie Hartley and Joan Ingilby.	1968	J.M. Dent & Sons
Life in the Moorlands of North-East; Yorkshire by Marie Hartley and Joan Ingilby.	1972	J.M. Dent & Sons
Shell Guide to East and North Ridings by Marie Hartley and Joan Ingilby.	1974	Shell Publications
Life and Tradition in West Yorkshire by Marie; Hartley and Joan Ingilby.	1976	J.M. Dent & Sons
A Dales Heritage by Marie Hartley and Joan; Ingilby.	1982	The Dalesman
The Origins of the Upper Dales Folk Museum by Marie Hartley and Joan Ingilby.	1984	Wensleydale Press
Alexander Fothergill & and the Richmond; Turnpike Road, edited by Marie Hartley and Joan Ingilby.	1985	North Yorkshire; County Record; Office
Dales Memories, by Marie Hartley and Joan; Ingilby.	1986	The Dalesman
Yorkshire Album by Marie Hartley and Joan; Ingilby.	1988	J.M. Dent & Sons
Yorkshire Dales Wood Engravings by Marie; Hartley.	1989	Smith Settle
A Dales Album by Marie Hartley and Joan; Ingilby.	1991	J.M. Dent & Sons
Yorkshire Dales Wood Engravings – A Further; Selection.	1991	Smith Settle
Forms and Colours, Marie Hartley.	1992	Smith Settle
A Farm Account Book from Wensleydale edited by Marie Hartley and Joan Ingilby.	1992	North Yorkshire; County Record; Office
Poems by Joan Ingilby,	1994	Smith Settle
A Favoured Land, Yorkshire in Text and Image, the work of Marie Hartley, Joan Ingilby and Ella Pontefract.	1994	Smith Settle
Marie Hartley's Picture Book	1995	Quince Tree Press
Fifty Years in the Dales by Marie Hartley and Joan Ingilby.	1995	Smith Settle
Marie Hartley : Wood Engravings by Marie; Hartley.	1996	Smith Settle
Making a Backcan	1997/8	Smith Settle
The Harvest of a Quiet Eye: A Tribute to Marie Hartley MBE	2006	The Friends of the Dales Countryside Museum
