= Joan Ingilby =

British artist, historian, and collector (1911–2000)

- Born: 11 December 1911; North Stainley
- Died: 27 October 2000 (aged 88)
- Education: Norfolk
- Occupation: writer
- Partner: Marie Hartley

Joan Alicia Ingilby MBE (11 December 1911 – 27 October 2000) was a British poet, historian and collector. Her books recorded life in the Yorkshire Dales and she was a co-founder of a museum founded on the artefacts that she and Marie Hartley had collected.

== Life ==
Ingilby was born at Sleningford Grange in North Stainley on 11 December 1911. Her parents were Marjorie Cecily (born Phelips) and Lieutenant-Colonel John Uchtred Macdowall Ingilby. Her father was related to the family who own Ripley Castle. Ingilby was sent to Norfolk for her education. She was a poet and her work was published in Country Life and Time and Tide.

Marie Hartley and Ingilby started to work together. Hartley had previously been in a long partnership with Ella Pontefract and they had published six books together. Pontefract had died young in 1945. Ingilby was an admirer of Pontefract, she said "She loved people and was the best listener I have ever met".

Ingilby and Hartley curated written material and artefacts. They stored their collection at their 17th-century cottage at Askrigg in Wensleydale. In the early 1970s they donated their gatherings to the former North Riding of Yorkshire County Council. In 1979 their donation formed the basis of the Dales Countryside Museum in Hawes.

They wrote the "groundbreaking" Life and Traditions in the Yorkshire Dales (1968), and The Old Hand Knitters of the Dales (1951) which showed how important knitting is. These two are considered to be classics. The archive of their documents and photographs remains in the care of the Yorkshire Archaeological Society, whose Silver Medal they won in 1993. Both were appointed MBE in 1997, and in 1999 received honorary degrees from the Open University. Ingilby died in 2000 aged 89. Hartley lived until 2006 and she too was cremated and both their ashes were cast on a hill above where they lived in the Yorkshire Dales.
