= White Hart Inn, Hawes =

Hotel in Hawes, North Yorkshire, England

Coordinates: 54°18′14″N 2°11′49″W

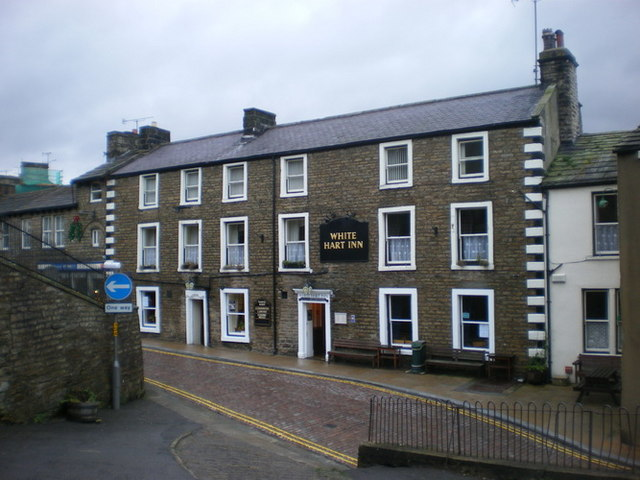
The hotel, in 2009

The White Hart Inn is a hotel in Hawes, a town in North Yorkshire, in England.

The inn claims 16th-century origins, but the current building is a principally 18th-century coaching inn. By the 1820s, it was one of two coaching inns in the town, with carriers to Askrigg, Halifax, Kendal and Richmond. It continues to operate as a hotel, with two dining rooms and a bar. It has been grade II listed since 1952.

The hotel is built of stone with chamfered rusticated quoins and a stone slate roof. It has three storeys and six bays. In the second bay is a doorway that has a 17th-century lintel with decorative moulding, The fourth bay contains a doorway with a moulded surround, paterae, an inscribed frieze and a cornice. The windows are sashes, and at the rear is a round-arched staircase window. Inside is the original 18th-century staircase.

== See also ==
- Listed buildings in Hawes
