= St Margaret's Church, Hawes =

Anglican church in North Yorkshire, England

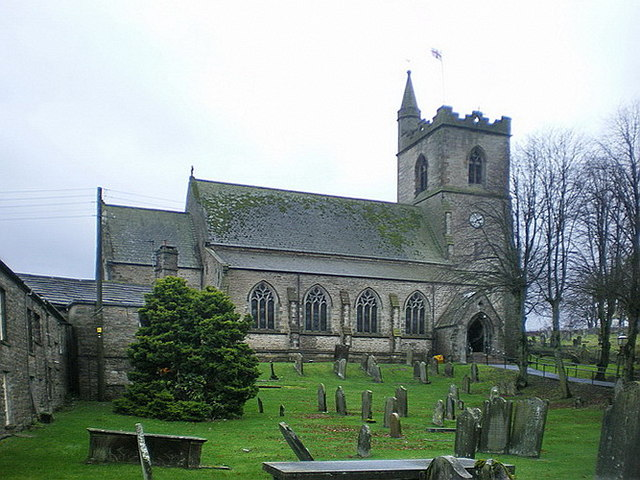
- St Margaret's Church, Hawes
- St Margaret's Church, Hawes
- 54°18′11.17″N 2°11′52.41″W
- OS grid reference: SD 87259 89758
- Location: Hawes
- Country: England
- Denomination: Church of England
- Website: https://upperwensleydalechurch.org/st-margarets/

History
- Dedication: St Margaret of Antioch
- Consecrated: 31 October 1851

Architecture
- Heritage designation: Grade II listed
- Architect: A B Higham
- Construction cost: £2,200

Administration
- Province: York
- Diocese: Leeds
- Archdeaconry: Richmond and Craven
- Deanery: Wensley
- Parish: Hawes

St Margaret's Church is a Grade II listed parish church in the Church of England in Hawes, North Yorkshire.

== History ==
Also known as Church of Saint Margaret of Antioch, the church was built in 1851 to the designs of the architect A B Higham. It cost £2,200 (equivalent to £270,000 in 2025) and was consecrated on 31 October 1851 by the Bishop of Ripon, Rt. Revd. Charles Longley.

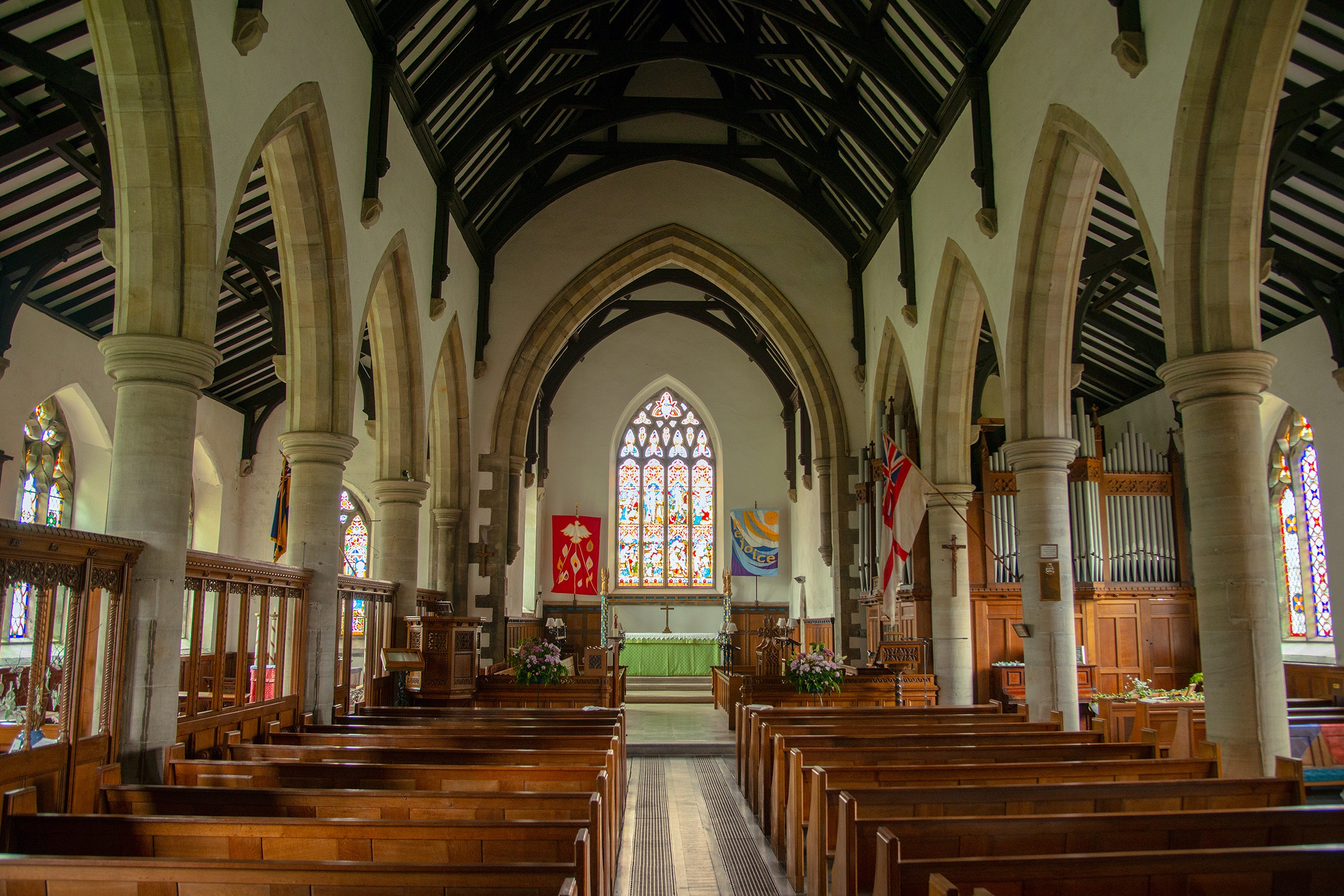
Interior of St. Margaret's

The church replaced the nearby village chapel of ease that was built in 1480. A monument over the north door with a Latin inscription commemorating Reverend Charles Udal (d. 1782), priest 1750 - 1781, predates the current building. Furniture inside the church is from the 1930s.

== Parish status ==
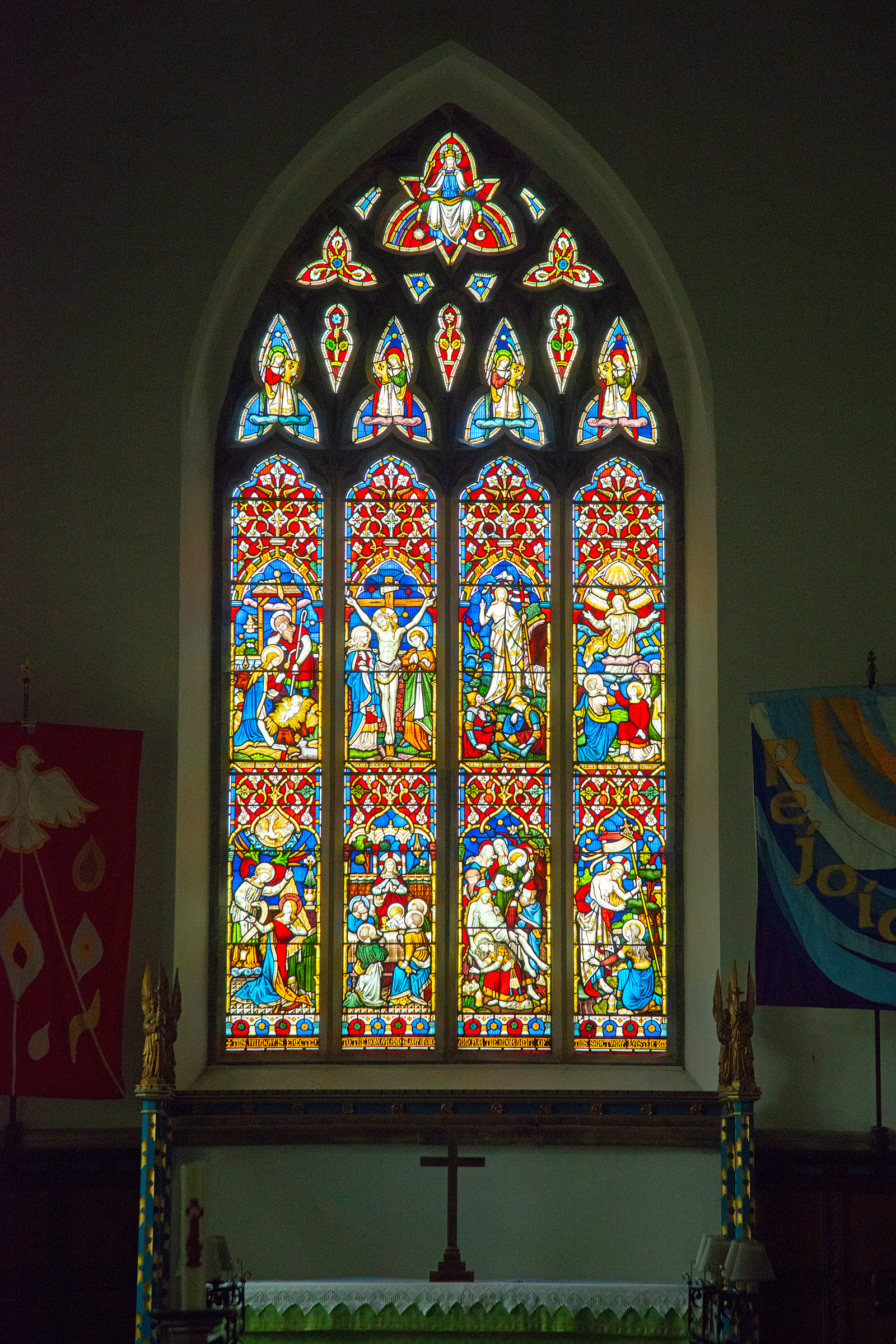
One of the stained glass windows

The church is in a Benefice with

- St Oswald's Church, Askrigg
- St Mary and St John's Church, Hardraw
- St Matthew's Church, Stalling Busk

== Organ ==
A pipe organ was built by T. Hopkins and Son. A specification of the organ can be found on the National Pipe Organ Register.

== See also ==
- Listed buildings in Hawes
