= Hawes Market Hall =

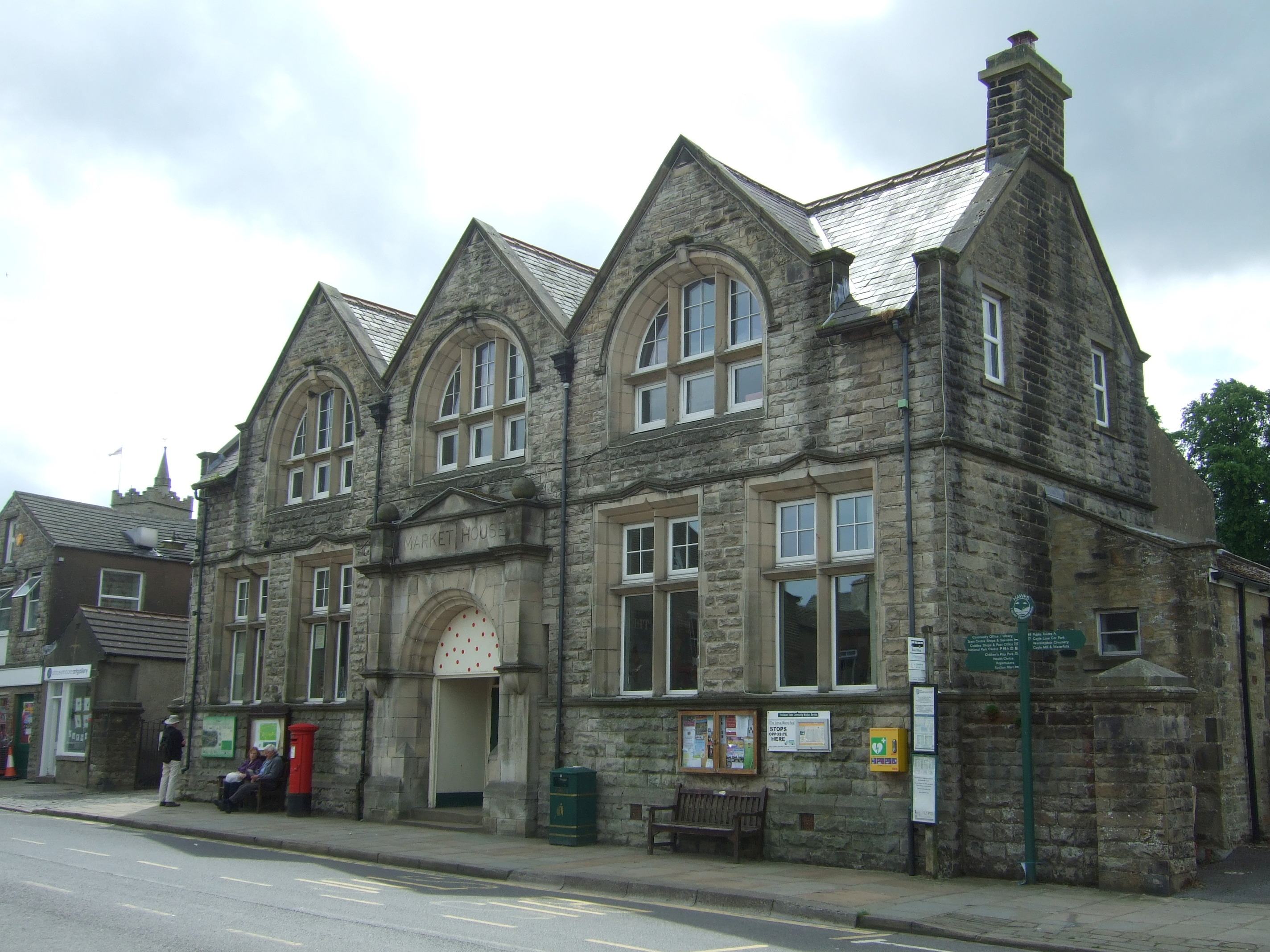
The building, in 2017

Hawes Market Hall is a building in Hawes, a town in North Yorkshire, in England.

Hawes was granted a market charter in 1700. Robert William Atkinson left a bequest of £1,500 for the construction of a market hall, although the amount was reduced following a court case, with the parish council making up the difference. The Market House Charity was created in 1894, and contracts for the construction of the building were signed in December 1897, with the building completed before the end of the century.

The building hosts a weekly indoor market on Tuesdays, in addition to craft fairs, exhibitions, concerts, and meetings. Its main hall is the largest in Wensleydale, with a stage and dressing rooms, and can seat up to 160 people. It originally contained a library, which was later converted into the Old Library Bookshop. Until 2017, it was run by Steve Bloom, who charged customers 50 pence to enter, and was described by the local district councillors as "the bookseller from hell".
