= Gayle Mill, North Yorkshire =

Grade II* listed building in England

Coordinates: 54.2999°N 2.1995°W

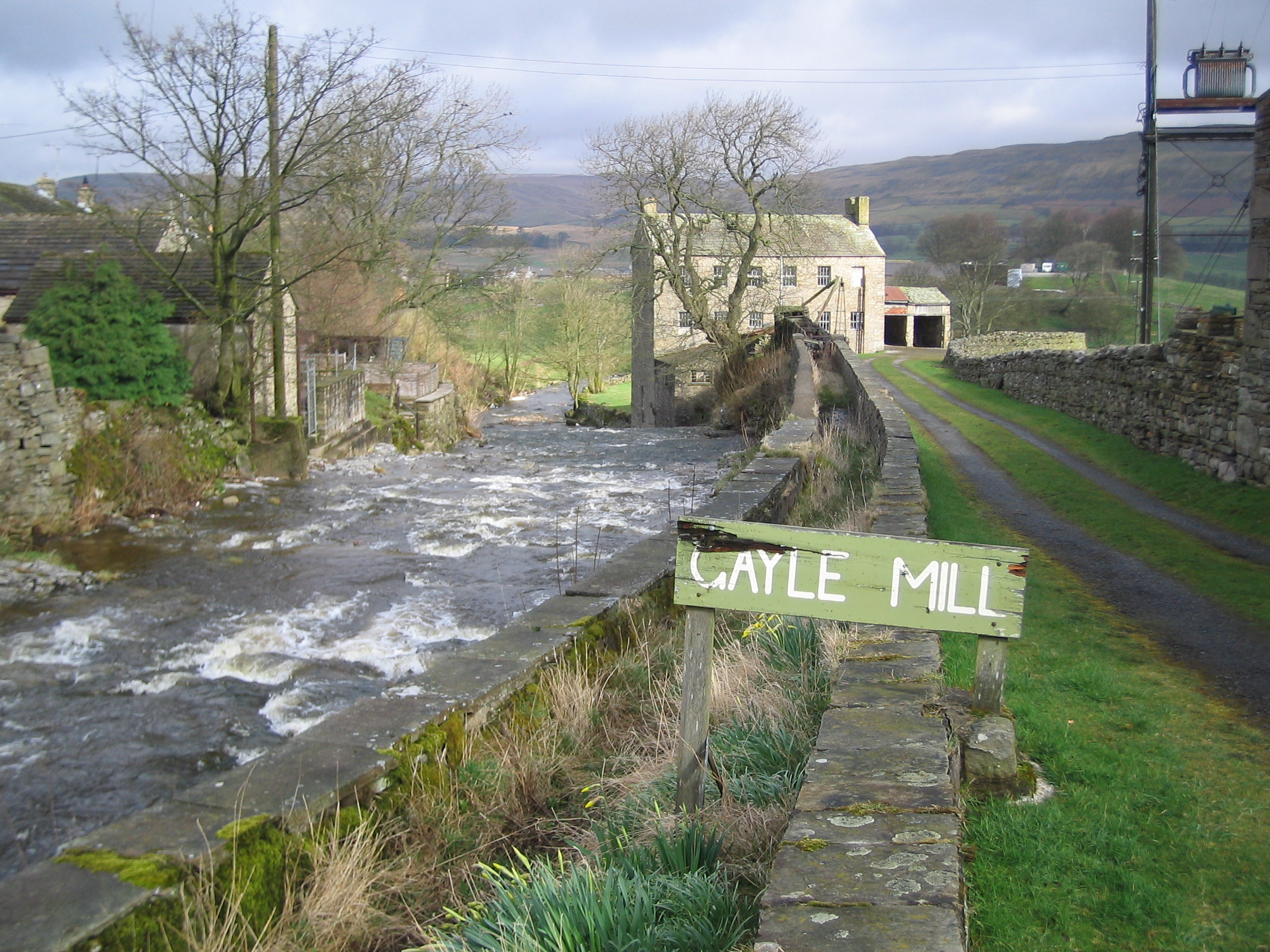
Gayle Mill, pictured in 2004

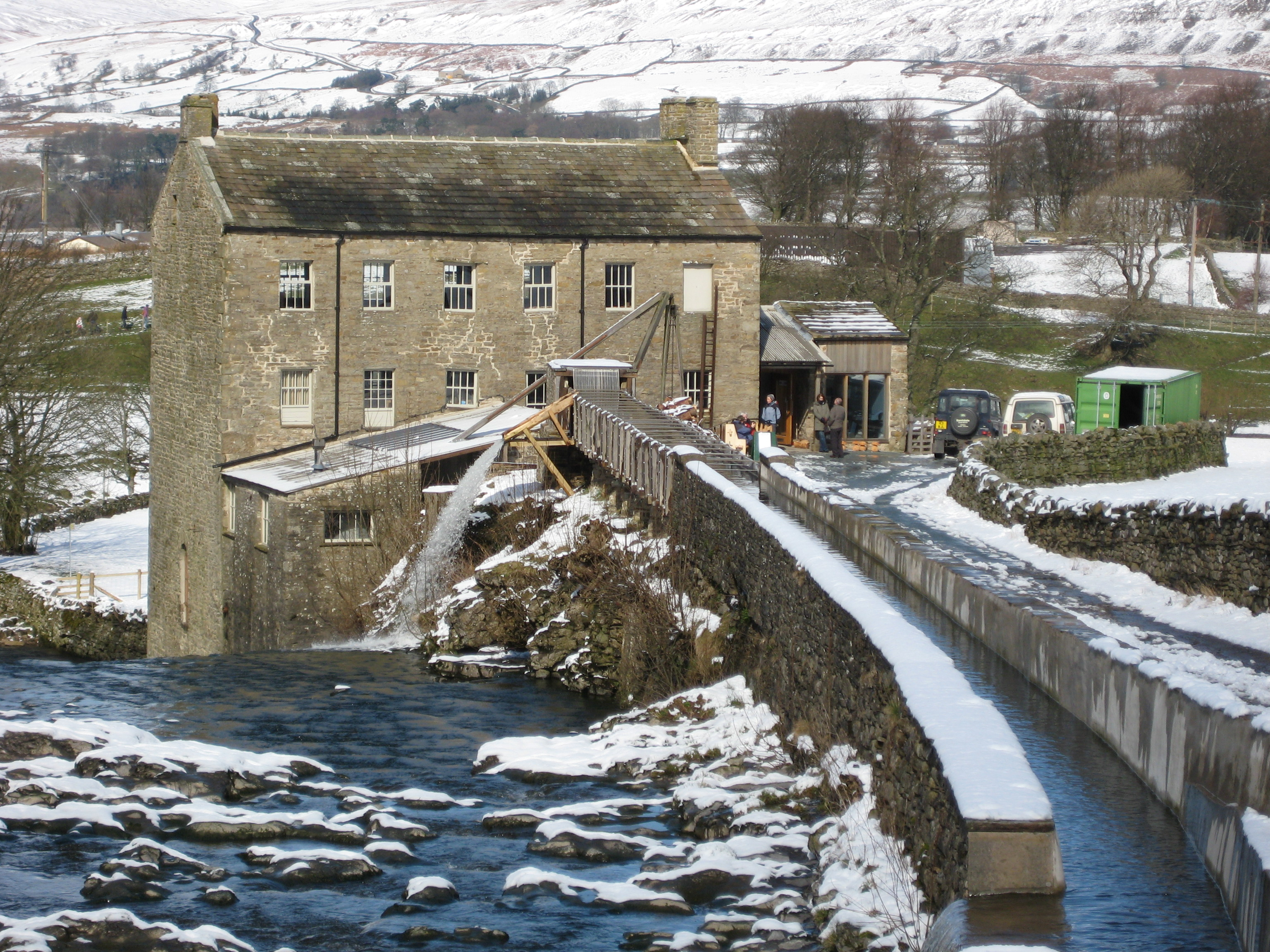
Gayle Mill, pictured in 2008

Gayle Mill, dating from about 1784, is thought to be the oldest structurally unaltered cotton mill in existence. It is located in the Wensleydale hamlet of Gayle, England, 1 mile (2 km) south of the market town of Hawes. It lies within the Yorkshire Dales National Park. The mill is owned by Cultura Trust (formerly known as the North of England Civic Trust (NECT); it was operated by a local volunteer group which paid a modest rent to the owner until March 2018 when the property was closed to enable additional repairs to be undertaken to make it safe for visitors.

== History ==
The Grade II* listed mill was built by local hosiers and land owners Oswald and Thomas Routh as a water-powered cotton mill, and was powered by a 22 feet (7 m) diameter overshot waterwheel. It was turned over to flax and wool spinning by 1813 for the local knitting industry. For a period in the 19th century, it was used for domestic accommodation.

It was converted to a sawmill around 1879. The waterwheel was removed and replaced with a Thomson double-vortex turbine, built by Williamsons (now Gilbert Gilkes & Gordon Ltd) of Kendal. This is thought to be the only remaining working variety of its type. In its heyday, the 10 hp (7.46 kW) created by the turbine drove a range of woodworking machinery – a rack sawbench, circular saw, thicknesser (planer), and lathes – by a series of belts and pulleys off a central line shaft.

In 1919, part of the mill was hired to provide electricity to the area using turbines for the generator. The mill provided electricity for the village until 1948. During the Second World War, soldiers from the Border Regiment and the Scots Guards were billeted in the top floor of the mill, and the millpond was used as a secret test location in the preparations for the Normandy landings.

== Restoration and current status ==
Gayle Mill closed in 1988, after over a century of operation as a sawmill, and it seemed likely it would be converted into luxury flats. In 2004 its plight came to national attention when it featured in the second series of BBC2's Restoration programme. It won the regional heat and came in the top three in the national finals. Restoration of the mill started in the same year and works to bring the site to operational standard took four years and cost over £1 million. Funding for the renovation came from several sources including the Heritage Lottery Fund, English Heritage and Yorkshire Forward.

A Friends group was established from the local community and from that, with the assistance of the building owners (NECT) Gayle Mill Trust was formed. The Mill re-opened to the public in 2008, operated by Gayle Mill Trust. Restoration's host Griff Rhys Jones returned to Gayle Mill in 2009 to film an update on the restoration work.

In 2012 Gayle Mill was featured on Channel 4's How Britain Worked, presented by Guy Martin.

The mill was operated as a centre for woodworking experience, providing training in traditional skills, a visitor attraction and an example of energy sustainability within the Yorkshire Dales National Park until March 2018.

In April 2018 the building closed to the public as further work was required to make the building safer and easier to operate. Fundraising began and in 2020 refurbishment work started. In 2021 the building work was completed and the building reopened to the public on a part time basis.

== See also ==
- Grade II* listed buildings in North Yorkshire (district)
- Listed buildings in Hawes
