= Dales Countryside Museum =

Museum in the Yorkshire Dales, England

Coordinates: 54.3046°N 2.1923°W

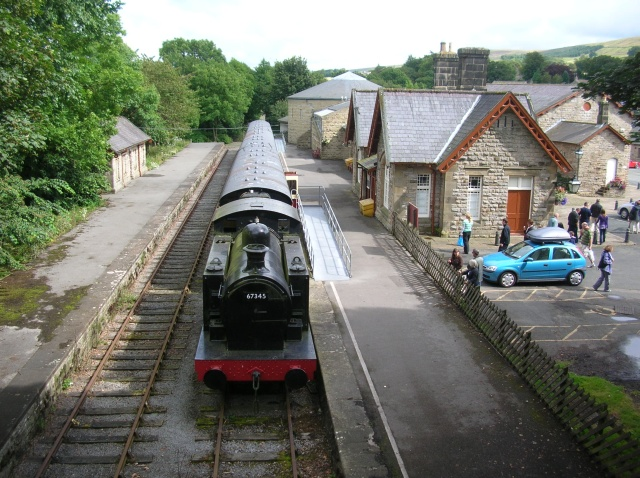
Buildings and museum train

The Dales Countryside Museum is a local museum which also functions as a visitor centre for the Yorkshire Dales National Park in Northern England. Run by the National Park Authority, it tells the story of the people who have lived and worked in the Yorkshire Dales for over a 1,000 years. The basis of the museum was a collection of artefacts gathered by Marie Hartley, Ella Pontefract and Joan Ingilby.

== The Museum ==
The museum is located beside the disused Hawes railway station in the small town of Hawes at the head of Wensleydale. The museum's outdoor display includes a real steam train and carriages on the track bed of the former Wensleydale Railway.

The railway station remains in its original site, now part of the museum building. Since 2015, part of the redundant station has been rented to a business operating a bike shop and later, also a cafe.

The steam engine (a Robert Stephenson & Hawthorn Works No 7845, No.12, Current number 67345 0-6-0T) was built in 1955 by Robert Stephenson & Hawthorn to work at Hams Hall Power Station at Sutton Coldfield. Little is known about the early preservation history of the locomotive although it was at Sheringham on the North Norfolk railway in 1975/76. It moved to Ruddington, at what is now the Great Central Railway at Nottingham, in 1998 for cosmetic restoration. For many years the locomotive has been on display at the Dales countryside Museum at Hawes at Wensleydale. It carries the number 67345 as this was the number of the NER G5 class locomotive which hauled the last passenger train out of Hawes station in 1959. The last freight train used the line in 1964 after which the line was lifted.
