= Gayle Village Institute =

Building in Hawes, North Yorkshire, England

Coordinates: 54°17′57″N 2°11′54″W

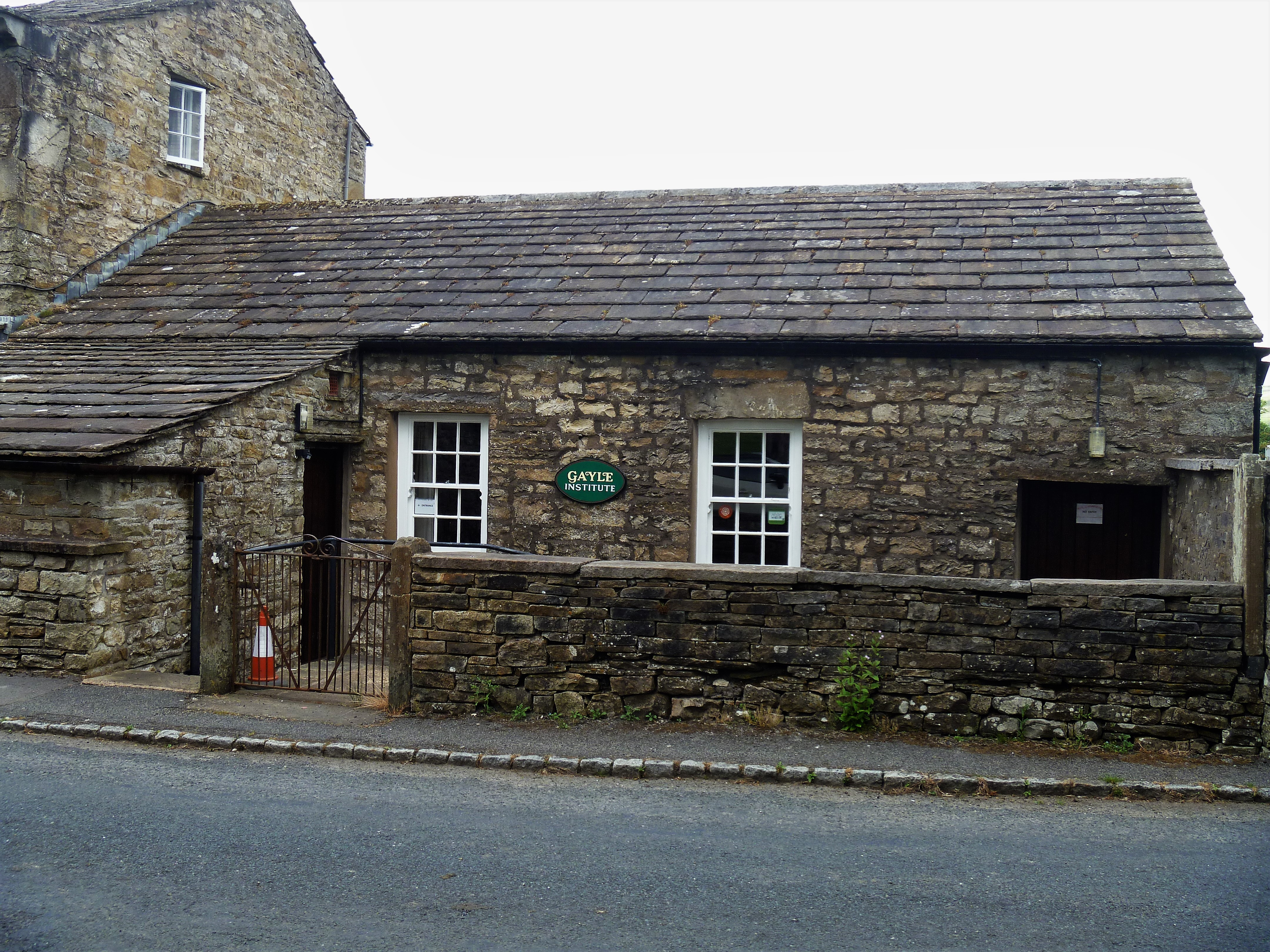
The building, in 2021

Gayle Village Institute is a historic building in Gayle, North Yorkshire, a village in England.

The building was constructed as a chapel in about 1755 by James Allen and the Batty brothers, who were followers of Benjamin Ingham. Shortly after, the congregation chose to join the Sandemanians. It remained in use until about 1906, then after some years was converted into the village institute. The building was grade II listed in 1952.

The simple building is constructed of stone with a stone slate roof. It has a single storey and three bays. On the right is a doorway, and the windows are casements.

== See also ==
- Listed buildings in Hawes
