= Wensleydale Creamery =

Cheese manufacturer in Hawes, North Yorkshire, England

- Type: Private
- Industry: Dairy
- Founded: 1897
- Founder: Edward Champan
- Headquarters: Hawes, North Yorkshire, England, United Kingdom
- Website: wensleydale.co.uk

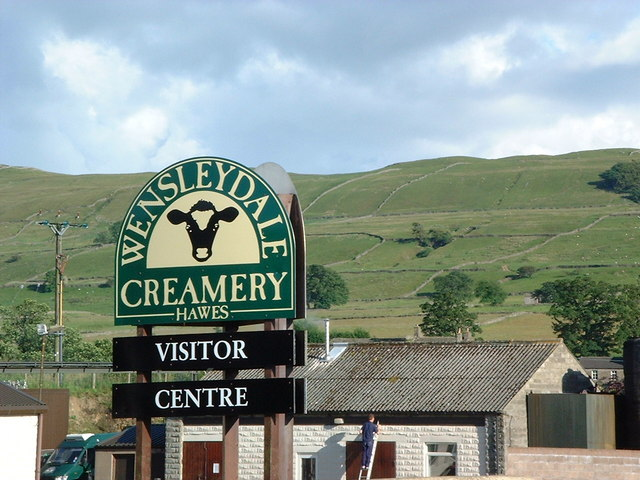
The Wensleydale Creamery Visitor Centre

Wensleydale Creamery is a cheese manufacturer based in the town of Hawes in North Yorkshire, England. It makes several varieties of cheese, but is most notable as a producer of Yorkshire Wensleydale, a variety of Wensleydale cheese with PGI status. It is a subsidiary of the Canadian dairy company Saputo.

== History ==
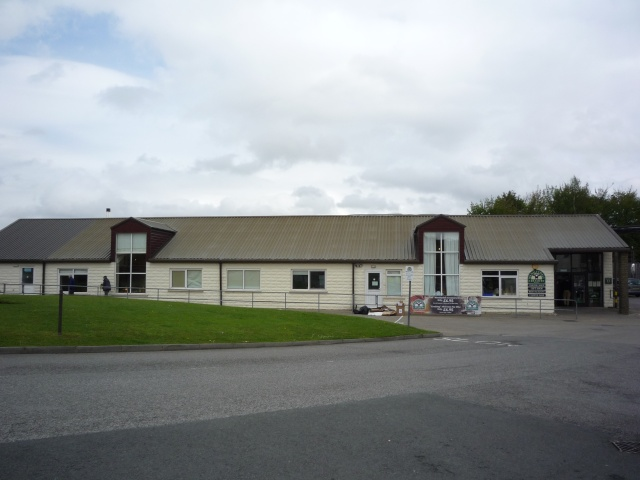
The Wensleydale Creamery

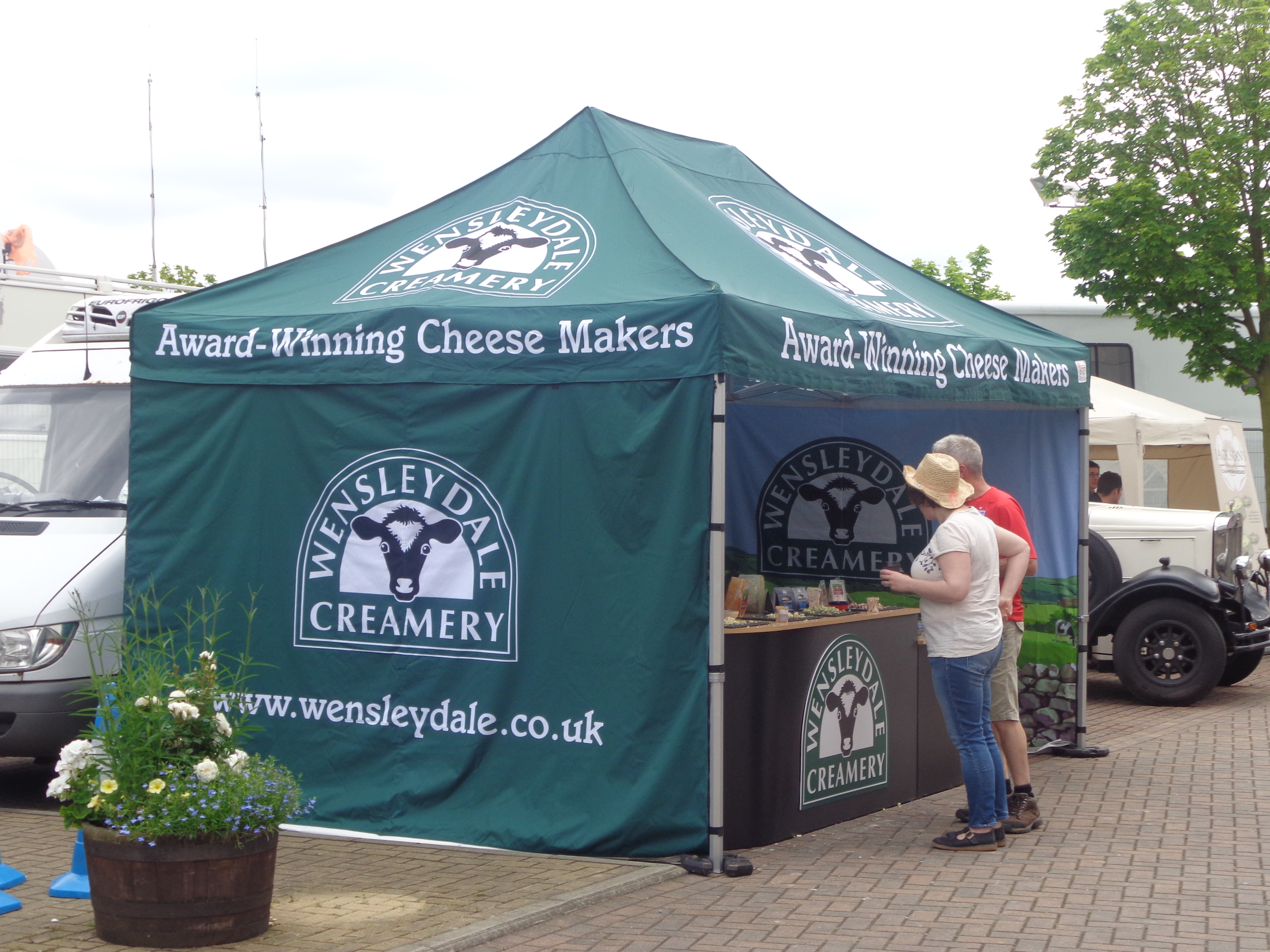
A Wensleydale Creamery stall at a 2014 Test match

In 1897 Edward Chapman established a commercial creamery in Hawes using traditional techniques and milk bought from local farms. The creamery was taken over in the 1930s by Kit Calvert who sold it to the Milk Marketing Board in 1966. In May 1992, Dairy Crest, a subsidiary of the Milk Marketing Board, closed the Hawes creamery with the loss of 59 jobs. Dairy Crest transferred production of Wensleydale cheese to Yorkshire's traditional rival, Lancashire. Six months later, in November 1992, following many rescue offers, a management buyout took place, led by local businessman John Gibson and the management team. With the help of eleven members of the former workforce, cheese making returned to Wensleydale.

Wensleydale Dairy Products sought to protect the name Yorkshire Wensleydale under an EU regulation; PGI status was awarded in 2013.

=== After 2015 ===
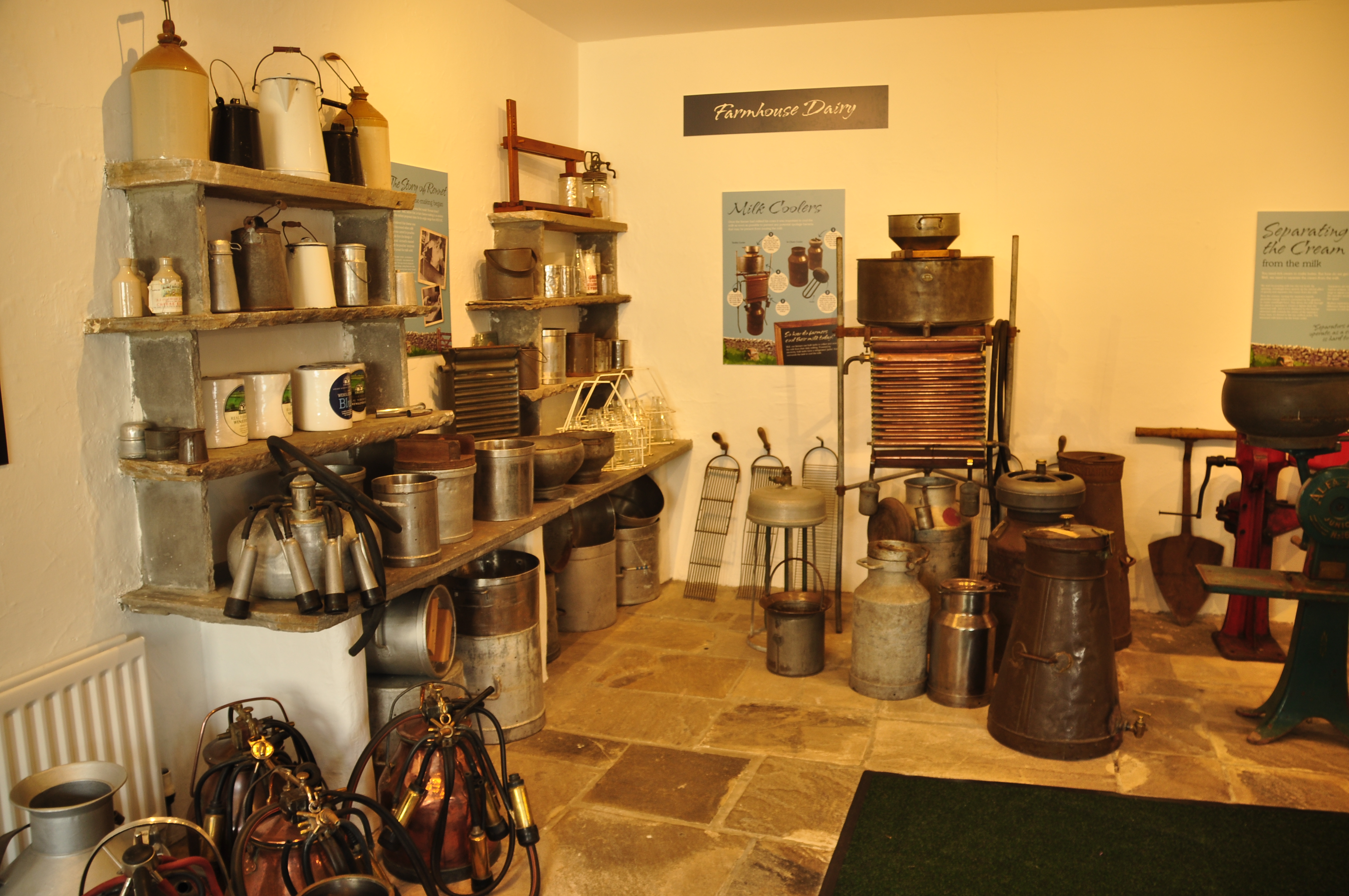
Tourists appreciate the quaint exhibits at the Creamery

The business moved to its current location in Hawes in 2015 and still handcrafts the eponymous cheese with a staff of 230. In 2017, the company made a £5 million investment in its dairy and cheese making facilities. In the financial year ending March 2017, the company sold 4,664 tonnes of cheese. The company estimated revenues of £27.5 million and pre-tax profits of around £1 million in their financial year ending in March 2018. Exports make up about 15% of the revenues and visits by tourists another 10%. The creamery has become a tourist attraction, visited by up to 300,000 people each year.

In January 2018, the company appointed David Salkeld as its new chairman, replacing Matthew Gribbin who was with the Creamery for ten years.

Wensleydale Creamery has won many awards at The Great Yorkshire Show's Cheese and Dairy Show. In 2018 Yorkshire Wensleydale took the Reserve Supreme Cheese title. The company also received ten gold, four silver and four bronze awards and four Best of Category trophies. In 2017, the creamery had won 22 awards.

In mid 2019, an announcement indicated that cheese waste (primarily whey) from the Creamery, which makes 4,000 tonnes of cheese per year, would help heat 4,000 Yorkshire homes with renewable "green gas". The Leeming biogas plant will use anaerobic digestion to turn the waste into methane biogas which will be burned for conversion into electricity. (The plant was already using this process with dairy waste from an ice cream manufacturing facility.) Any whey residue remaining after the process will be spread in the area to improve the soil.

In July 2021 the business was acquired by Saputo for £23 million.

== Products ==
The Wensleydale Creamery makes several cheeses including Cheddar, Red Leicester and varieties of Wensleydale such as Blue. Their Yorkshire Wensleydale is produced in versions including traditional, smoked, and blended with cranberries.

== Pollution ==
Pollution in 2023 and 2025 in a tributary of the River Ure was caused by a faulty drainage system at the Creamery.
