= Listed buildings in Hawes =

Hawes is a civil parish in the county of North Yorkshire, England. It contains 48 listed buildings that are recorded in the National Heritage List for England. Of these, one is listed at Grade II*, the middle of the three grades, and the others are at Grade II, the lowest grade. The parish contains the town of Hawes, the villages of Appersett, Burtersett and Gayle, and the surrounding countryside. Most of the listed buildings consist of houses, cottages and associated structures, farmhouses and farm buildings. The others include bridges, a viaduct, a watermill and its pentrough, hotels and public houses, a limekiln, a church and the churchyard railings, a former chapel, a boundary marker, a milepost and a telephone kiosk.

== Key ==
Grade	Criteria
II*	Particularly important buildings of more than special interest
II	Buildings of national importance and special interest

== Buildings ==
Name and location	Photograph	Date	Notes	Grade
Low Houses Farmhouse; 54.28569°N 2.25686°W		1614	The farmhouse is in rendered stone and has a stone slate roof. There are two storeys and four bays. The doorway has a chamfered surround, and an initialled and dated lintel with a triangular soffit and a hood mould. To its right is a two-light double-chamfered mullioned window with a hood mould, and the other windows are casements with slab lintels.	II
Stone Gill Foot; 54.26815°N 2.26530°W	—	Mid to late 17th century	Two cottages, later a farmhouse, in stone, with quoins on the right, and a stone slate roof with a kneeler on the right. There are two storeys and four bays, On the front are two doorways, and the windows are a mix of sashes and casements, some with mullions, and one with a hood mould.	II
Cockett's Hotel; 54.30440°N 2.19932°W		1668	The hotel, at one time a temperance hotel, is in stone, with quoins on the right, and a stone slate roof. There are two storeys and four bays. On the front are two doorways, the right one with a quoined surround, a moulded arris, a four-centred arched head, and an inscribed and dated lintel. The windows are sashes, some with chamfered jambs.	II
North House, High Houses; 54.28171°N 2.25363°W	—	1673	A house and a barn under one roof, in ruins, in stone on a boulder plinth, with a stone slate roof, and two storeys. The house has three bays, and a central doorway with a slab lintel and a hood mould. The windows are chamfered and mullioned. The barn has one bay and a lean-to, and contains a doorway with a moulded chamfered surround, a four-centred arched head, and an initialled and dated lintel.	II
The Villa; 54.31150°N 2.21909°W	—	Late 17th century	The house is in stone, with a stone slate roof, two storeys, and three bays. The doorway is in the centre, and the windows are a mix of casements, sashes and fixed-light windows, one with a hood mould.	II
Barn east of Pratts House; 54.28263°N 2.25348°W		1683	A house, later a barn, in stone with quoins and a stone slate roof. There are two storeys and three bays. On the front are two doorways with quoined chamfered surrounds, one with a dated and initialled lintel, and between them is a small window. On the left return are external steps to an upper floor doorway.	II
Old Hall; 54.29890°N 2.19891°W		1695	The house is in stone with a stone slate roof, two storeys and six bays. In the fifth bay is a projecting gabled porch containing a doorway with a moulded arris, and a lintel with decorative initialled and dated panels, above which is a Venetian window with a chamfered surround. The other windows vary, and include a sash window, casements, one with a mullion, a round-headed fire window; some of the windows have hood moulds.	II
Rose House; 54.30423°N 2.19864°W		1697	The house, later a restaurant, is rendered, and has a stone slate roof. There are two storeys and four bays. The doorway has a moulded arris, a lintel with decorative panels containing initials and the date, and a slab cornice on corbels. The windows are sashes.	II
Hillary Hall; 54.29889°N 2.16901°W	—	Late 17th to early 18th century	The house is in stone with quoins and a stone slate roof. There are three storeys and four bays. Above the lintel of the doorway is a moulded doorhead with a pulvinated frieze and a dated keystone. The windows vary; some are mullioned, some are casements, some are sashes, some have architraves, and some have hood moulds.	II
Pratts House, High Houses; 54.28252°N 2.25383°W	—	Late 17th to early 18th century	The house is in stone, with quoins, and a stone slate roof with coping on the left. It is in two and three storeys, and has five bays. The central doorway has a quoined surround and a decorated lintel. The windows vary; some have fixed lights, some are sashes, others are casements, some have mullions, and at the rear is a stair cross window with a mullion and a transom. To the right is a lower two-storey outbuilding with steps to an upper floor doorway.	II
Thorns (Eastern House); 54.30663°N 2.20871°W		Late 17th to early 18th century	A farmhouse in stone with quoins and a stone slate roof. There are three storeys and two bays. In the centre is a doorway with a stone surround on plinths, moulding on the arris, and a segmental-arched soffit to the lintel. The ground floor contains casement windows with chamfered surrounds, in the middle floor are sash windows, and the top floor contains mullioned casements.	II
Force Head Farmhouse and railings 54.29917°N 2.19863°W		1711	The house is in stone, with a stone slate roof, two storeys and two bays. The central doorway has an architrave with capitals and a dated keystone, a fanlight, a cornice and a detached pediment. The windows are paired sashes in architraves with mullions, and there is a hood mould over the ground floor. In front of the house is a low wall with simple wrought iron railings, and a central gate with cast iron urn finials to the standards.	II
Appersett Bridge; 54.31156°N 2.22032°W		Early 18th century	The bridge carries the A684 road over Widdale Beck, and was widened in 1795 by John Carr. It is in stone, and consists of a single segmental arch. The downstream side has pilasters flanking the arch, a band, a parapet with saddleback coping ending in circular bollards, and there are stone abutments.	II
Appersett Farmhouse; 54.31153°N 2.21894°W	—	Early 18th century	The farmhouse is in stone with quoins on the right and a stone slate roof. There are two storeys and two bays. The central doorway has a chamfered surround with interrupted jambs, and a triangular lintel with a four-centred arched soffit. The windows in the left bay are chamfered and mullioned with hood moulds, and in the right bay they are sashes with chamfered surrounds and slab lintels.	II
Cottage east of Ashes; 54.30626°N 2.20545°W	—	Early 18th century	The cottage is in stone with a stone slate roof. There are two storeys and an attic, and two bays. The windows have chamfered surrounds, some with hood moulds, and one with impost jambs.	II
Farm building west of Greystones; 54.29804°N 2.17056°W	—	Early 18th century	A house, later a farm building, in stone with quoins and a stone slate roof. There are two storeys and two bays. The doorway is in the centre, the windows have two lights and architraves, and there is a fire window.	II
Low Houses Byre; 54.28547°N 2.25699°W		1727	The byre is in stone with quoins and a stone slate roof. There are two storeys and two bays. On the front are two doorways, each with a quoined surround. The left doorway has a decorative motif in a recessed panel and the date on the lintel, and the right doorway has brackets for an upper floor platform. The upper floor contains a single-light window and a doorway.	II
Rookhurst; 54.29889°N 2.20382°W		1734	The house, which was extended in about 1870, is in stone, with quoins, and a roof partly in stone slate and partly in Westmorland slate. It is in two and three storeys, and has four bays. The older part has mullioned windows, some with hood moulds, in the lower two floors, and casements in architraves in the op floor. The later part has a projecting two-storey octagonal porch containing a doorway with a carved border and a shield above. In the upper floor is a bay window with a pyramidal roof, and in the right return is another two-storey bay window under a gable with bargeboards.	II
Mirk Pot Farmhouse; 54.27875°N 2.26477°W	—	Early to mid 18th century	The farmhouse is in stone with quoins and a stone slate roof. There are two storeys and three bays. In the centre is a gabled porch, the windows are casements with chamfered surrounds, and to the left is a fire window.	II
Ashes; 54.30629°N 2.20603°W		Mid 18th century	The house is in stone on a plinth, with rusticated quoins, a modillion cornice and a stone slate roof. There are two storeys, and an L-shaped plan, with a main range of five bays and a rear wing. In the centre is a doorway in an eared architrave, with a pulvinated frieze and a modillion pediment. The windows in the main range are sashes, in the rear wing are a three-light chamfered mullioned window, and a tall round-arched stair window with imposts and a keystone.	II
Coach house west of Ashes; 54.30622°N 2.20619°W	—	Mid 18th century	The former coach house is in stone with quoins and a stone slate roof. There are two storeys and three bays. On the front is a coach opening with a rolled steel joist lintel, a vent, and a pigeoncote in the gable. The right return contains small openings with impost jambs, and a pitching door and small openings in the upper floor.	II
Cobbles Head; 54.29896°N 2.16581°W	—	Mid 18th century	The house is in stone with quoins and a stone slate roof. There are two storeys and two bays. In the centre is a gabled porch and a doorway with imposts, and the windows are casements.	II
Hawes Bridge; 54.30370°N 2.19521°W		18th century	The bridge carries a road over Gayle Beck. It is in stone, and consists of a single segmental arch of voussoirs with a hood mould. The parapet has segmental coping. In the west abutment is a rectangular opening for the pentrough leading to Gayle Mill.	II
Limekiln; 54.31159°N 2.22092°W		18th century	The limekiln to the west of Appersett Bridge is in stone. It has a circular plan and is built into a hillside, with a walled approach. It contains a semicircular arch of stone voussoirs, and there is a circular hole on the top.	II
White Hart Hotel; 54.30387°N 2.19699°W		18th century	The hotel is in stone with chamfered rusticated quoins and a stone slate roof. There are three storeys and six bays. In the second bay is a doorway that has a 17th-century lintel with decorative moulding, The fourth bay contains a doorway with a moulded surround, paterae, an inscribed frieze and a cornice. The windows are sashes, and at the rear is a round-arched staircase window.	II
Village Institute; 54.29921°N 2.19837°W		1755	Originally a Sandemanian chapel, later used for other purposes, it is stone with a stone slate roof. There is a single storey and three bays. On the right is a doorway, and the windows are casements.	II
How Beck Bridge; 54.35586°N 2.33109°W		Mid to late 18th century	The bridge carries a road over the River Ure in its early stages. It is in stone, and consists of a single segmental arch of voussoirs. The carriageway rises high above the stream, and the parapets have slab coping.	II
House southwest of Clints House; 54.29836°N 2.19960°W		Late 18th century	A wool warehouse converted into a house, it is in stone, with quoins on the right, and a stone slate roof with a shaped kneeler and stone coping on the right. There are two storeys and an attic, and three bays. The central doorway has a pediment, the windows are sashes, and there are two small windows under the eaves.	II
Greystones; 54.29810°N 2.17019°W	—	Late 18th century	The house is rendered, and has a stone slate roof, two storeys and two bays. The central doorway has an architrave on a plinth and a keystone. The windows are sashes in architraves with splayed bases, and there is a fire window with a similar surround.	II
Mid Widdale House and byre 54.27426°N 2.29304°W	—	1780	The farmhouse and byre are in stone, with a stone gutter brackets, a stone slate roof, and two storeys. The house has three bays, and a central doorway with a dated and initialled lintel. To the left is a two-light window with a chamfered surround and a flat-faced mullion, and the other windows are casements with chamfered surrounds. The byre to the right has quoins, a central doorway in each floor, a fire window with a moulded surround, a two-light chamfered mullioned window with a moulded lintel, and other small windows.	II
Gayle Mill; 54.29989°N 2.19951°W		1784	Originally a cotton mill, later a saw mill, it was originally driven by an overshot waterwheel, and later by turbines. The mill is in stone with quoins and a stone slate roof. There are three storeys and six bays. In the third bay is a doorway with small wheels set into the floor, and the windows are fixed, with eight panes. At the rear is a blocked arch with voussoirs and a hood mould. In the right return is a blocked doorway, and the left return has an entrance in the upper floor.	II*
Pentrough, Gayle Mill; 54.29940°N 2.19931°W		c. 1784	The trough carried water from Gayle Beck to power the waterwheel, then the turbines, of the mill. It extends for about 100 metres (330 ft), and is in stone with timber boarding, emptying into a sump about 10 metres (33 ft) from the mill.	II
Former Black Bull Café; 54.30411°N 2.19797°W		Late 18th to early 19th century	The hotel is in limestone, with chamfered rusticated quoins, shaped stone gutter brackets and a stone slate roof. There are three storeys and three bays. The central doorway has a slab cornice on shaped brackets, to the right is a gabled porch, and the windows are casements.	II
Gayle Bridge; 54.29891°N 2.19941°W		Late 18th to early 19th century	The bridge carries a road over Gayle Beck. It is in stone and consists of a single segmental arch of voussoirs with a hood mould. The parapets have slab coping.	II
Haylands Bridge; 54.30903°N 2.19149°W		Late 18th to early 19th century (probable)	The bridge carries Brunt Acres Road over the River Ure. It is in stone, and consists of two segmental arches with squared voussoirs. The bridge has a triangular cutwater, a band, and parapets with segmental coping, ending in bollards.	II
Park House; 54.29887°N 2.20343°W		Late 18th to early 19th century	The house is in stone, with shaped gutter brackets, and a stone slate roof with stone copings and kneelers. There are two storeys and three bays. In the centre is a Tuscan portico with paterae and a pediment, and the windows are sashes.	II
Tarney Fors Farmhouse; 54.29666°N 2.24555°W		Late 18th to early 19th century	The former farmhouse is in stone with quoins and a stone slate roof. There are two storeys, four bays, and a rear outshut. On the front are two doorways, one blocked, the windows are a mix of sashes and casements, and in the right return are through-stones.	II
Churchyard railings, St Margaret's Church; 54.30312°N 2.19720°W		Early 19th century	The railings enclosing the churchyard are in wrought iron. They are simple railings with urn finials to the standards.	II
Clints House and railings 54.29841°N 2.19952°W		Early to mid 19th century	The house is in stone, with a stone slate roof, two storeys and two bays. The doorway has a wooden Roman Doric doorcase with a broken pediment, and the windows are sashes. In front of the house are wrought iron railings with urn finials to the standards, rising to a point in front of the door.	II
Church Hall; 54.30311°N 2.19706°W		1845	A school, later a church hall, it is in stone with quoins, stone gutter brackets, and a stone slate roof with stone coping. There is a single storey and four bays. On the front is a porch, and a round-arched doorway with imposts and a keystone. The windows have round arches, Y-tracery, imposts and keystones, and on the right gable is a bell turret.	II
St Margaret's Church; 54.30326°N 2.19729°W		1850–52	The church is in stone with Westmorland slate roofs, and is in Decorated style. It consists of a nave, north and south aisles, north and south porches, a chancel with a south vestry and a west tower. The tower has three stages, diagonal buttresses, a stair tower on the southeast corner with a spire rising higher than the tower, clock faces, and a pierced embattled parapet.	II
Appersett New Bridge; 54.31403°N 2.22002°W		Mid to late 19th century	The bridge carries the A684 road over the River Ure. It is in stone and consists of a single segmental arch of voussoirs with a hood mould. The parapet has slab coping.	II
Bridge on track leading to Widdale Side; 54.29089°N 2.26011°W	—	Mid to late 19th century	The bridge is in stone, and consists of a single segmental arch of voussoirs. The parapets have been partly replaced by metal fencing.	II
Widdale Bridge; 54.28645°N 2.26775°W		Mid to late 19th century	The bridge carries a road over Widdale Beck. It is in stone, and consists of a single segmental arch of voussoirs. The parapets have segmental coping.	II
Appersett Viaduct; 54.30886°N 2.22240°W		c. 1875	The viaduct was built for the Hawes branch of the Midland Railway, now closed, to carry its line over Widdale Beck and Lanacar Lane. It is in rusticated stone, and consists of five semicircular arches with a slightly curving plan. The bridge has tall tapering piers, the middle one with a cutwater, a band, a coped parapet, and terminal pilasters.	II
Boundary marker 54.32820°N 2.31812°W		Late 19th century	The boundary marker, on the north side of the A684 road, is in cast iron, and marks the boundary between North Yorkshire and Cumbria. It is about 500 millimetres (20 in) high, with triangular plan and a sloping top. On each side is a pointing hand, the left side is inscribed "WEST RIDING" and the right side is inscribed "NORTH RIDING, ASKRIGG H D".	II
Milestone; 54.32821°N 2.31810°W		Late 19th century	The boundary marker, on the north side of the A684 road, is in cast iron, and marks the boundary between North Yorkshire and Cumbria. It is about 500 millimetres (20 in) high, with triangular plan and a sloping top. On each side is a pointing hand, on the left side is the distance to Sedbergh, and on the right side the distance to Askrigg.	II
Telephone kiosk 54.29898°N 2.19922°W		1935	The K6 type telephone kiosk at the entrance to Gayle Mill was designed by Giles Gilbert Scott. Constructed in cast iron with a square plan and a dome, it has three unperforated crowns in the top panels.	II
