= Gayle, North Yorkshire =

Hamlet in North Yorkshire, England

Coordinates: 54.299°N 2.200°W

Gayle
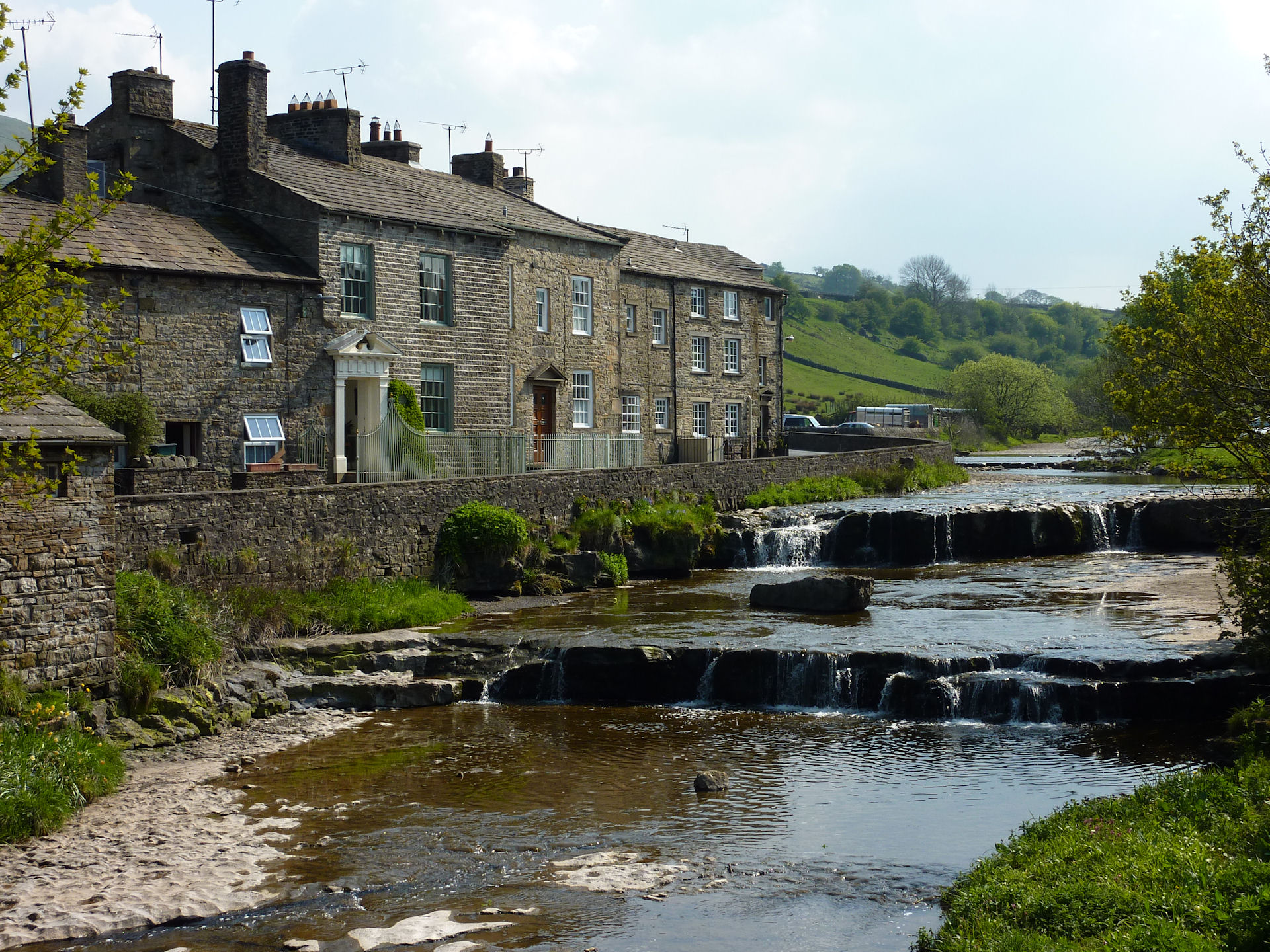
- Gayle Beck

- Location within North Yorkshire
- OS grid reference: SD870893
- Civil parish: Hawes
- Unitary authority: North Yorkshire
- Ceremonial county: North Yorkshire
- Region: Yorkshire and the Humber
- Country: England
- Sovereign state: United Kingdom
- Post town: HAWES
- Postcode district: DL8
- Police: North Yorkshire
- Fire: North Yorkshire
- Ambulance: Yorkshire

Gayle is a hamlet 0.4-mile (0.64 km) south of Hawes in Wensleydale, North Yorkshire, England. It is noted for the beck that flows through it and the old mill, which featured on the BBC TV programme Restoration.

== History ==
Gayle was originally a farming settlement but the population grew during the late 18th century to around 350 with employment in local quarries, coal-mining in Sleddale and in a water-driven cotton mill on Gayle Beck. The beck is noted for its steep descent through Gayle into Hawes and for the Aysgill waterfall 1-mile (1.6 km) upstream of the hamlet. The population later contracted. In modern times the population is recorded within the Parish of Hawes for census purposes. Historically, the hamlet was in the Parish of Aysgarth, in the wapentake of Hang West. Hawes was a small village or hamlet until the late 1790s, when the Richmond to Lancaster Turnpike was diverted away from the moor south of Gayle to run through Hawes, which accelerated the growth of Hawes and established it as a parish. Gayle is now part of the Parish of Hawes in the district of Richmondshire.

East of the hamlet is the remains of what is believed to be an outpost of the Roman camp at nearby Bainbridge. The Cam High Fell road passed near Gayle, and the village itself may have been a point where Gayle Beck was either bridged or forded. A ford still runs through the beck to the west of the grade II listed Gayle Bridge. The main road through the hamlet ran east-west; the road into Hawes was not opened until 1829 as part of the act establishing the Hawes to Kendal Turnpike.

Nikolaus Pevsner, writing in his book The Buildings of England; Yorkshire, the North Riding, describes Gayle as "...in its village way, is almost as intricate as Hawes, almost as intricate as an Italian stone village...". The core area of the older pre-20th century village was made a conservation area in 2001, with most of the other housing being situated on the road north into Hawes.

Gayle had a Methodist Church, constructed around 1755. A breakaway Methodist sect, associated with the Sandemanians in Scotland, was previously associated with the village, but only their graveyard, east of the chapel, now remains. The chapel was adapted into Gayle Village Institute and is now grade II listed.

== Industry ==
Gayle Mill, constructed in the 1780s, is now a grade II* listed building, a scheduled monument and came third in the BBC's 2004 Restoration contest. Originally a cotton-spinning mill it was converted to a sawmill in 1878. It is the oldest structurally unaltered cotton mill in existence, and its Thomson Double-Vortex turbine built by Williamson's of Kendal in 1878 is believed to be the world's oldest surviving water turbine still in its original situation. The mill has been restored and is now open to the public. A leat channels water from Gayle Beck into the mill over a distance of 330 feet (100 m). As the leat is boarded with timber, it is known as a pentrough. A millpond was also built for the mill some way to the south on level ground beside the beck. This was built so that in times of low water flow, the water could be collected overnight and then released when needed the next day to power the mill.

The hills and the valley of Sleddale to the south and west of the hamlet provided coal and peat for local consumption for heating purposes. Many of the buildings in and around Gayle and Hawes were built with carboniferous sandstone quarried from Scar Head and East Shaw quarries south of the hamlet.

== See also ==
- Listed buildings in Hawes

== Sources ==
- Gayle Conservation Area Appraisal (PDF). yorkshiredales.org.uk (Report). Bainbridge: Yorkshire Dales National Park. 2011.
- North Yorkshire Federations of Women's Institutes. The North Yorkshire Village Book. Countryside Books, Newbury, 1991. ISBN 1-85306-137-9.
