= Wensleydale cheese =

English cheese

Wensleydale
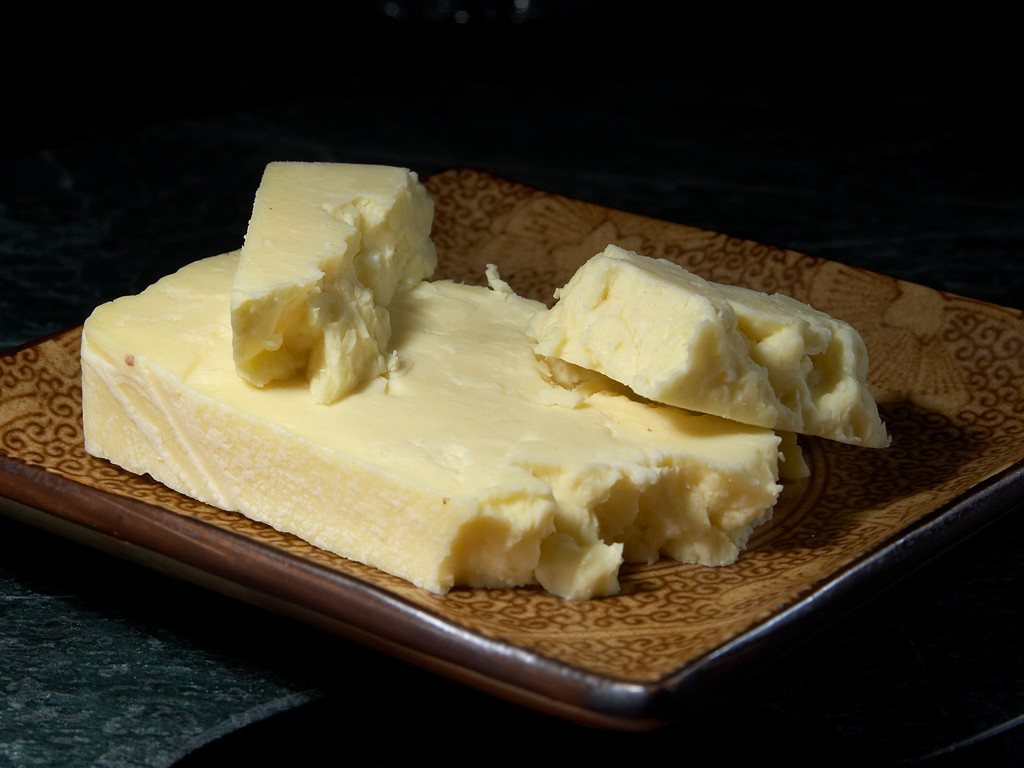
- Country of origin: England
- Region: Wensleydale, North Yorkshire
- Source of milk: Cows (formerly ewes)
- Texture: Medium, crumbly
- Aging time: 3–6 months
- Certification: PGI 2013 (Yorkshire Wensleydale)
- Named after: Wensleydale

Wensleydale is a style of cheese originally produced in Wensleydale, North Yorkshire, England, but now mostly made in large commercial creameries throughout the United Kingdom. The term "Yorkshire Wensleydale" can only be used for cheese that is made in Wensleydale.

The style of cheese originated from a monastery of French Cistercian monks who settled in northern England, and continued to be produced by local farmers after the monastery was dissolved in 1540. Wensleydale cheese fell to low production in the mid 1980s to the early 1990s, but its popularity was revitalized by frequent references in the Wallace & Gromit series.

== Flavour and texture ==
Wensleydale is a medium cheese that is supple and crumbly. It has a slight honey aroma.

=== Common flavour combinations ===
The flavour of Wensleydale is suited to combination with sweeter produce, such as sweet apples. Many restaurants and delicatessens serve a version of the cheese that contains cranberries.

In Yorkshire and North East England, the cheese is often eaten with fruit cake or Christmas cake.

== History ==
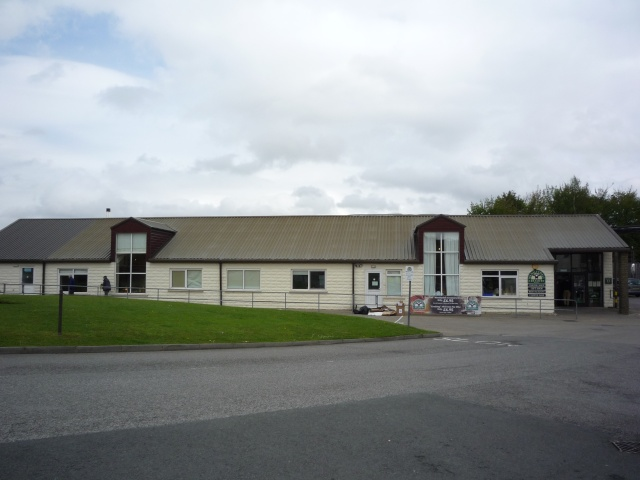
The Wensleydale Creamery in Hawes, North Yorkshire

Wensleydale cheese was first made by French Cistercian monks from the Roquefort region, who settled in Wensleydale. They built a monastery at Fors. Some years later the monks moved to Jervaulx in Lower Wensleydale. They brought with them a recipe for making cheese from sheep's milk.

In the 14th century, cows' milk began to be used instead, and the character of the cheese began to change. A little ewes' milk was still mixed in since it gave a more open texture, and allowed the development of blue mould. At that time, Wensleydale was almost always blue with the white variety almost unknown. Today the opposite is true, with blue Wensleydale rarely seen.

When the monastery was dissolved in 1540, the local farmers continued making the cheese until the Second World War, when most milk in the UK was used for the making of ration-era government cheddar. Even after rationing ceased in 1954, cheese making did not return to pre-war levels.

The first creamery to produce Wensleydale commercially was established in 1897 in the town of Hawes. Wensleydale Dairy Products, who bought the Wensleydale Creamery in 1992, sought to protect the name Yorkshire Wensleydale under an EU regulation. Protected Geographical Indication status was awarded in 2013.

== References in culture ==
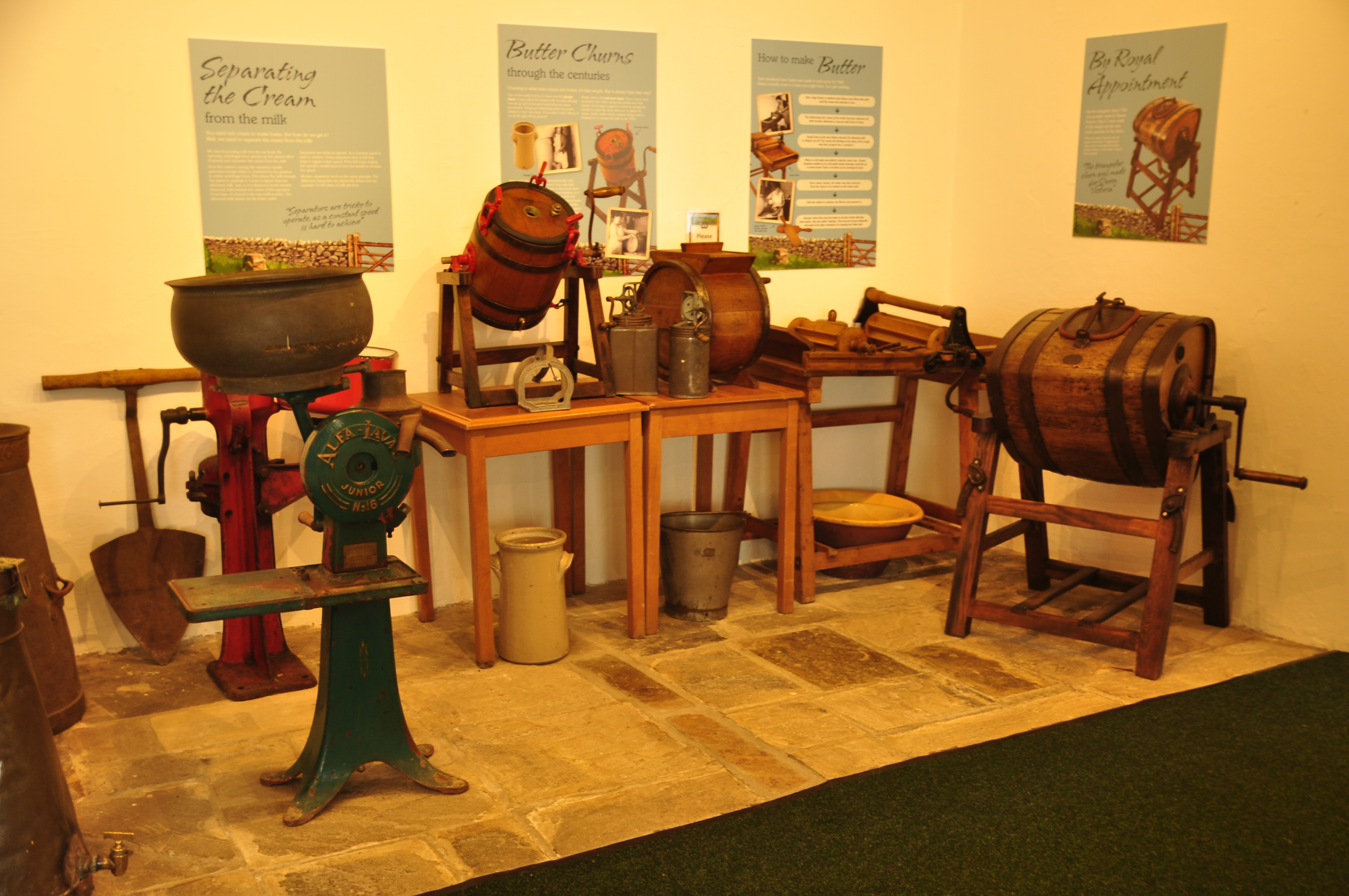
Traditional equipment at the Wensleydale Creamery

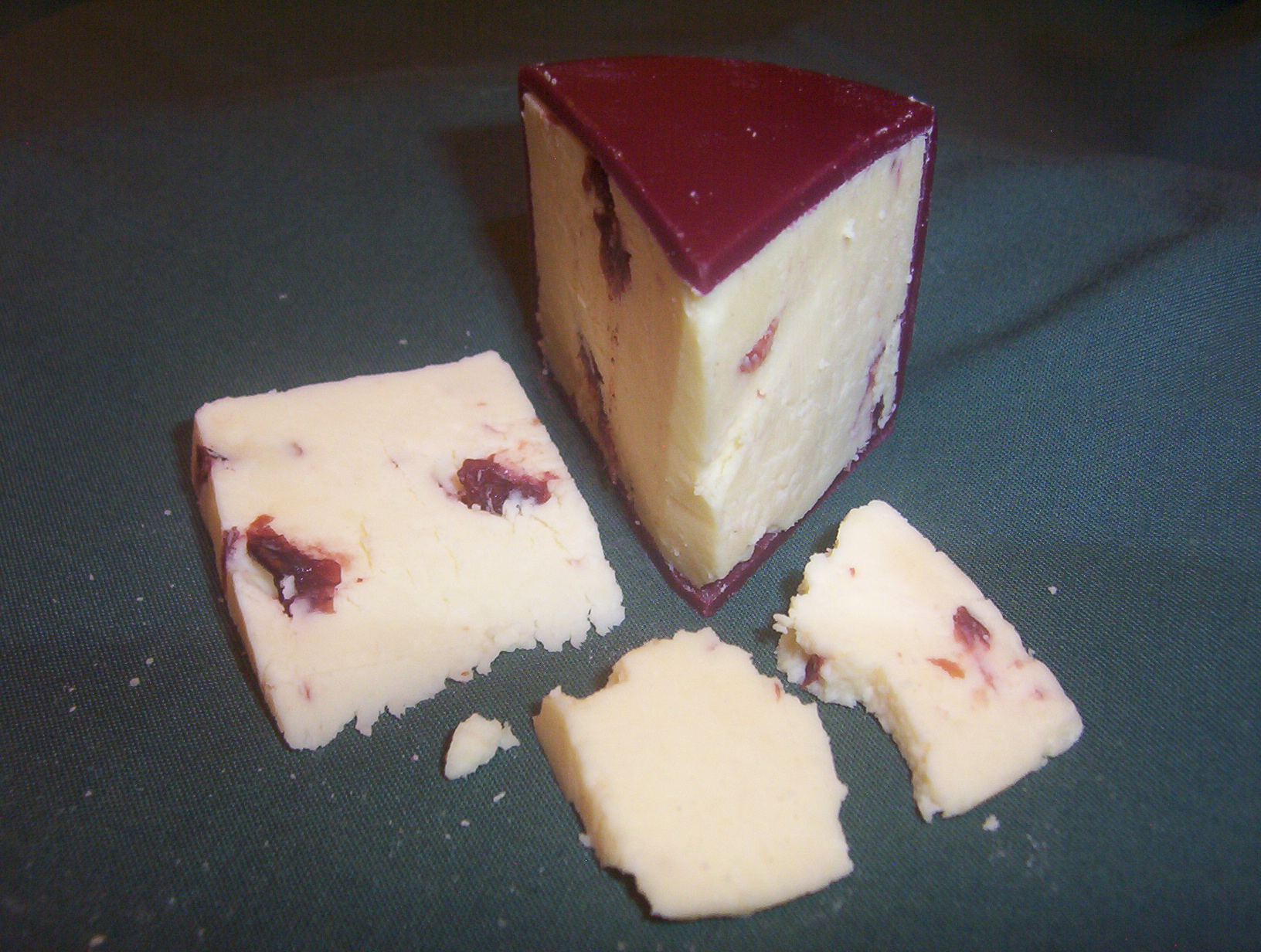
Wensleydale with cranberries

George Orwell rated Wensleydale second behind Stilton in his 1945 essay "In Defence of English Cooking".

In the 1990s, sales of Wensleydale cheese from the Wensleydale Creamery had fallen so low that production in Wensleydale itself was at risk of being suspended. The cheese experienced a boost in its popularity after being featured in the Wallace & Gromit franchise. The main character of the series, Wallace, a cheese connoisseur, most notably mentions Wensleydale as a particularly favourite cheese in the 1995 short A Close Shave.

Animator and creator Nick Park chose it solely because it had a good name that would be interesting to animate the lip sync to, rather than due to its origins in northern England where the shorts were set. He was also unaware of the financial difficulties that the company was experiencing.

The company contacted Aardman Animations about a licence for a special brand of Wensleydale cheese called, "Wallace & Gromit Wensleydale", which sold well. When the 2005 full-length Wallace & Gromit film, The Curse of the Were-Rabbit, was released, sales of Wensleydale cheeses increased by 23%.

Wensleydale is one of the cheeses mentioned in the Cheese shop sketch of Monty Python's Flying Circus that Mr. Mousebender attempts to purchase, without success. There is a glimmer of hope the shop may have this variety of cheese, only for the proprietor to reveal that his name is Arthur Wensleydale, and he thought he was being personally addressed.

== See also ==
- List of cheeses
- List of British cheeses
