= Hawes =

Market town and civil parish in North Yorkshire, England

Coordinates: 54°18′15″N 2°11′47″W

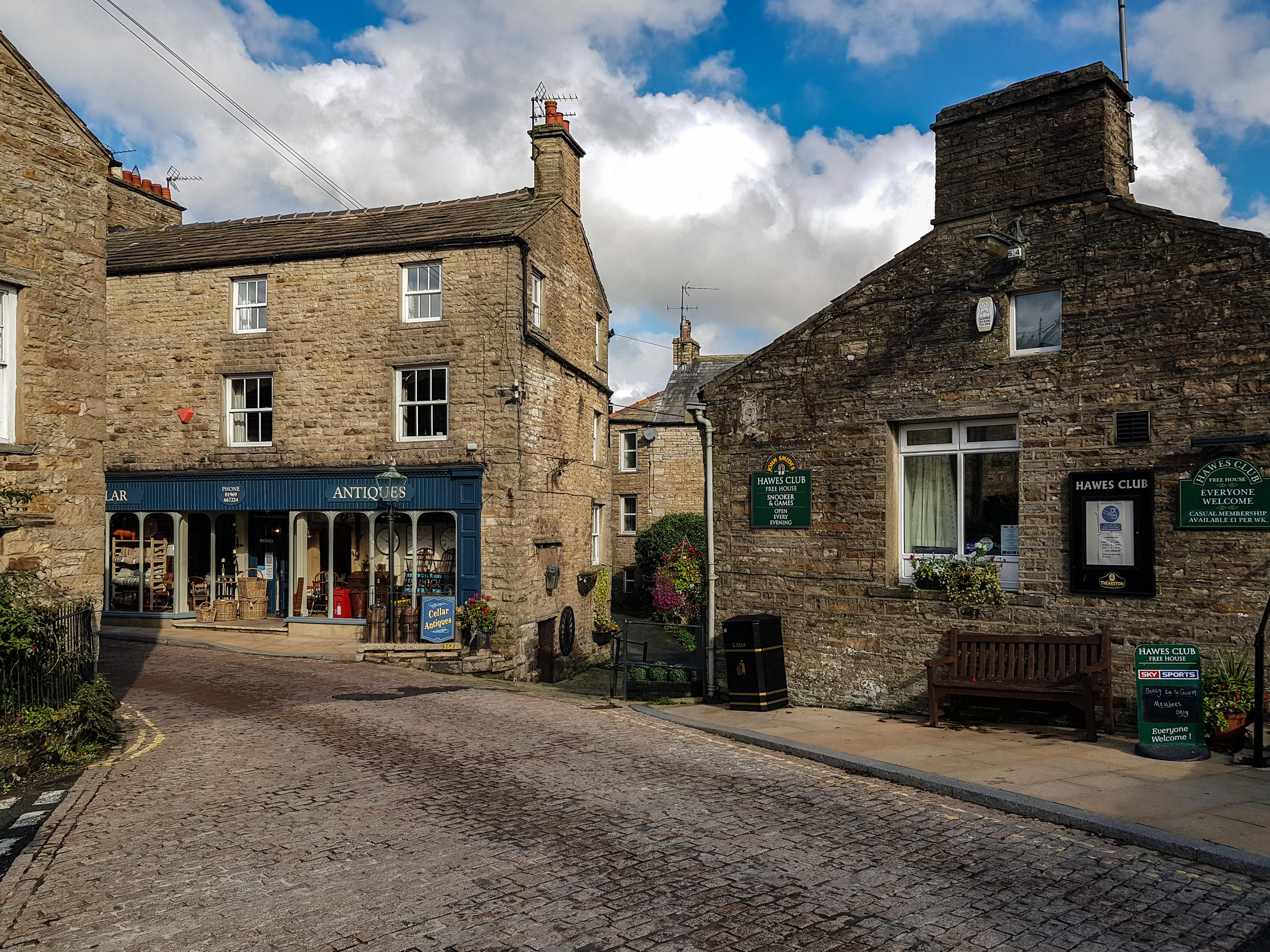
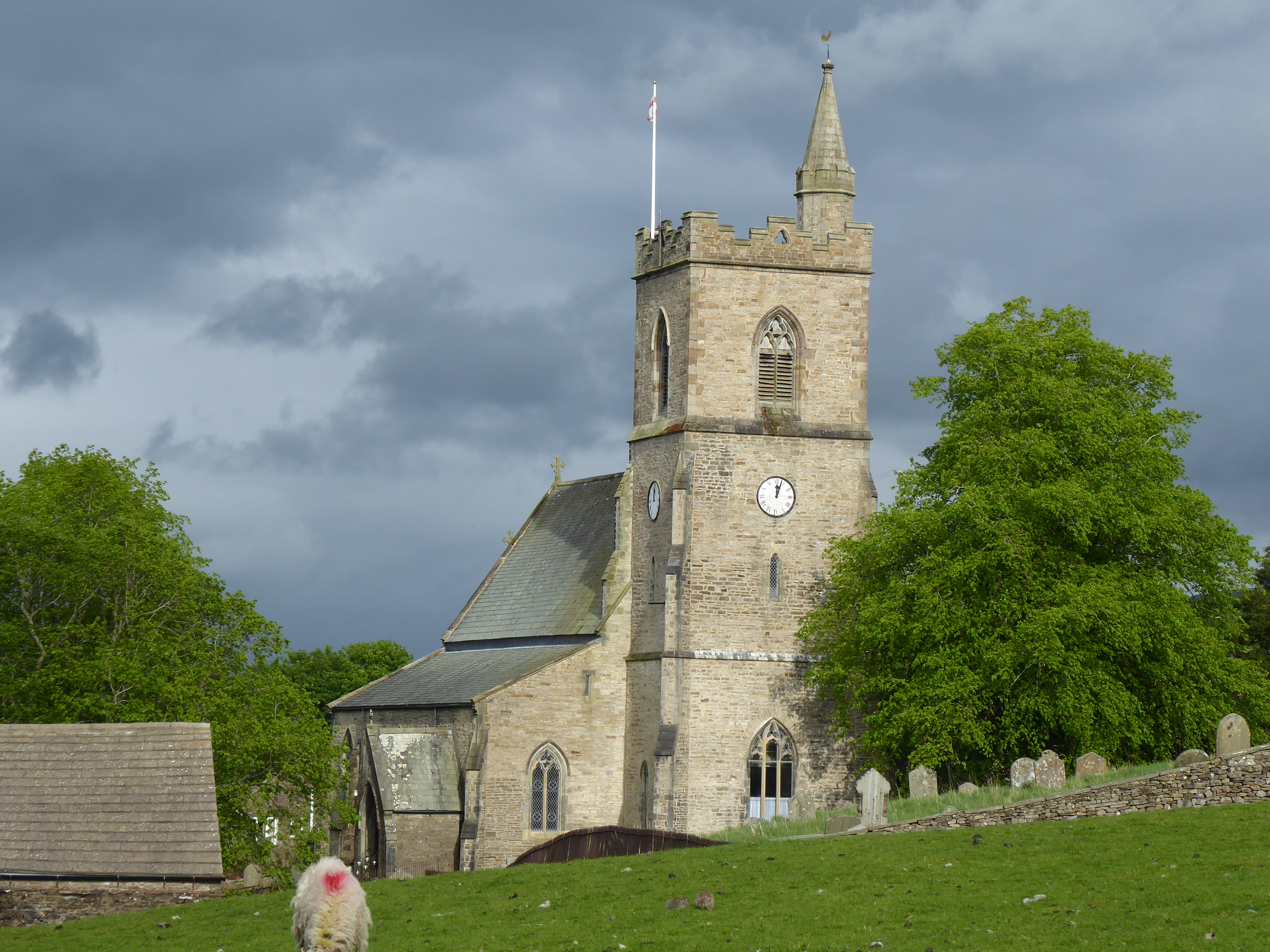
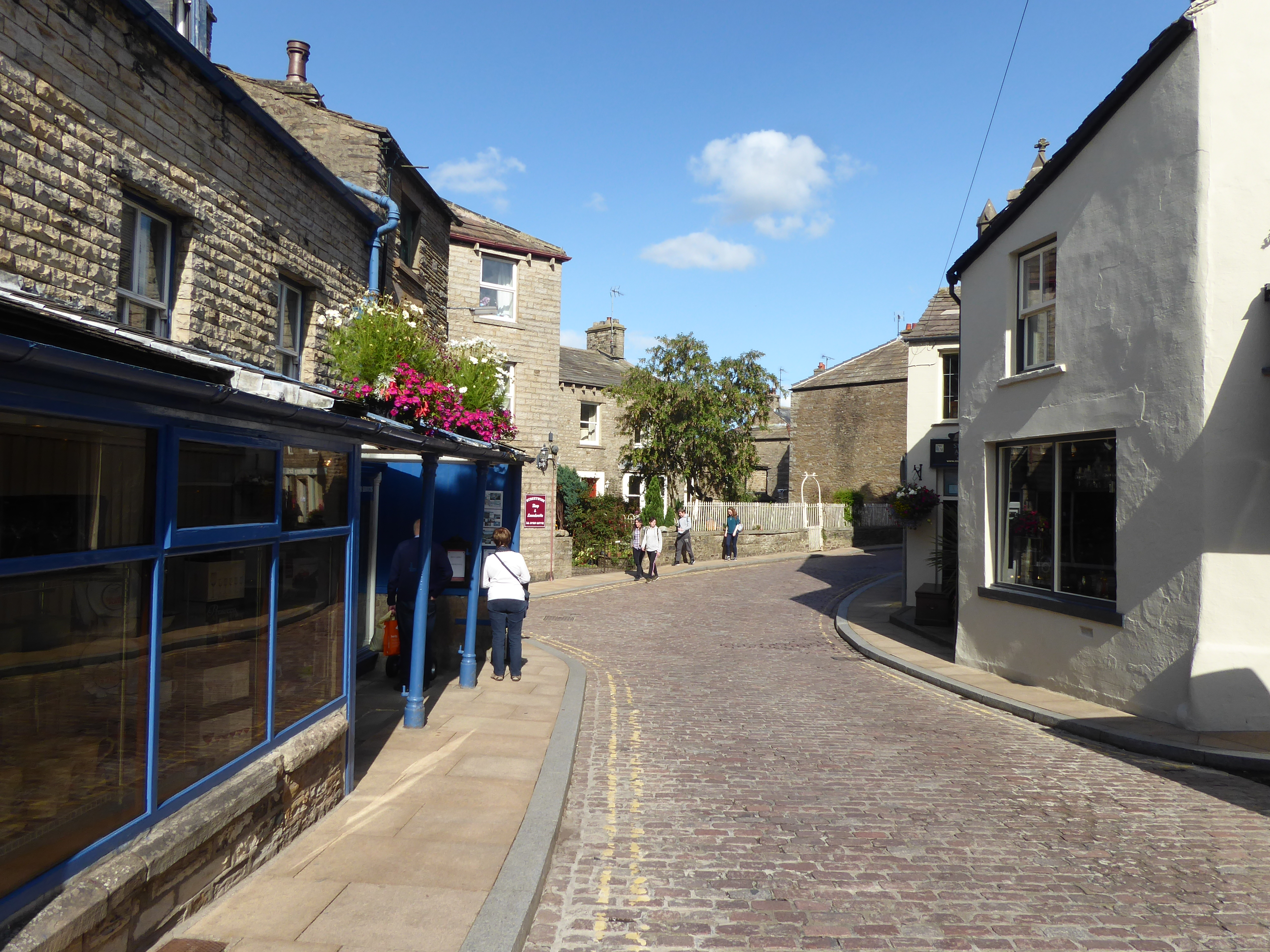
- Main Street St Margaret's Church The Hill

- Location within North Yorkshire
- Population: 1,137 (2011 census)
- OS grid reference: SD873898
- Unitary authority: North Yorkshire
- Ceremonial county: North Yorkshire
- Region: Yorkshire and the Humber
- Country: England
- Sovereign state: United Kingdom
- Post town: HAWES
- Postcode district: DL8
- Dialling code: 01969
- Police: North Yorkshire
- Fire: North Yorkshire
- Ambulance: Yorkshire
- UK Parliament: Richmond and Northallerton

Hawes is a market town and civil parish in North Yorkshire, England, situated at the head of Wensleydale in the Yorkshire Dales, and historically part of the North Riding of Yorkshire. The parish had a population of 1,137 according to the 2011 census.

The parish of Hawes includes the neighbouring hamlet of Gayle. Hawes lies approximately 31.2 miles (50.2 km) west of the county town of Northallerton. It is renowned as a major producer of Wensleydale cheese.

Hawes is located within the Yorkshire Dales National Park and is a popular tourist destination.

A local non-profit organisation works to secure funding to maintain and reopen community amenities.

== History ==
There is no mention in the Domesday Book of 1086 of a settlement where the current town is located. The area was historically part of the large ancient parish of Aysgarth in the North Riding of Yorkshire, and there is little mention of the town until the 15th century when the population had risen enough for a chapel of ease to be built. The settlement was first recorded in 1307 as having a marketplace.

The place's name is derived from the Old Norse word hals, meaning "neck" or "pass between mountains".

The town was granted a charter to hold markets by King William III in 1699. It allowed for a weekly Tuesday market and two fairs a year. In 1887 an auction market was established in the town that held cattle sales fortnightly. In addition, five cattle fairs and three sheep fairs were held each year. Soon after, four cheese fairs spread over the year also became a regular event in the town.

Hawes became a separate ecclesiastical parish in 1739, and a civil parish in 1866.

The Richmond to Lancaster Turnpike was diverted in 1795 and from then on, it passed through Hawes. The Wensleydale Railway reached Hawes in 1878. The village once had a railway station that was the terminus of the Hawes branch of the Midland Railway and an end-on terminus of the line from Northallerton from its opening in 1878 to its closure in April 1954. British Railways kept the line to Garsdale Junction open for passengers until 1959. The Wensleydale Railway Association which operates a heritage train has plans to rebuild the railway from Northallerton (from its current western terminus at Redmire) to Garsdale including re-opening the station in the village. Hawes railway station remains in its original site, now part of the Dales Countryside Museum. Since 2015, the building has been rented to a business operating a bike shop and later a cafe.

In the past, a water-powered mill operated at Gayle and in Hawes; Gayle Mill, for example, was built in 1784. The mills were used to grind corn, produce textiles (wool, cotton, linen, silk, flax), generate electricity or saw wood. Limestone was burnt in kilns. In 1789, Gayle Mill adopted new technology, and became a mechanised sawmill powered by a double-vortex turbine. In 1919, part of the mill was hired to provide electricity to the area using turbines for the generator. The mill provided electricity for the village until 1948.

== Governance ==
Hawes is part of the Richmond and Northallerton parliamentary constituency. The current Member of Parliament is Rishi Sunak, a Conservative, who is a former Prime Minister of the United Kingdom.

Hawes lies within the Upper Dales electoral division of North Yorkshire Council. It was part of the Richmondshire district from 1974 to 2023.

The civil parish shares a grouped parish council with the civil parish of High Abbotside, known as Hawes & High Abbotside Parish Council. This is also an electoral ward with a combined population taken at the 2011 Census of 1,347.

== Geography ==
The parish of Hawes covers the large areas of moorland on Dodd Fell, Snays Fell, Stags Fell and Widdale Fell and includes the River Ure tributaries of Widdale Beck and Gayle Beck. The latter flows through the town of Hawes. There are many abandoned lead mines, quarries and limekilns in the parish indicating its industrial past. A short distance from the town on Gayle Beck are the Aysgill Force waterfalls. The highest point in the parish is Great Knoutberry Hill at 2,205 feet (672 m). The parish extends as far north as Hellgill Bridge along a narrow strip either side of the Ure.

The civil parish of Hawes also includes the neighbouring hamlets of Gayle, Appersett and Burtersett. The A684 road from Sedbergh to Osmotherley passes through the town and the B6255 begins at the western edge of the town and links it to Ingleton.

The M6 and the A1 to the east are under an hour away by car.

== Economy ==
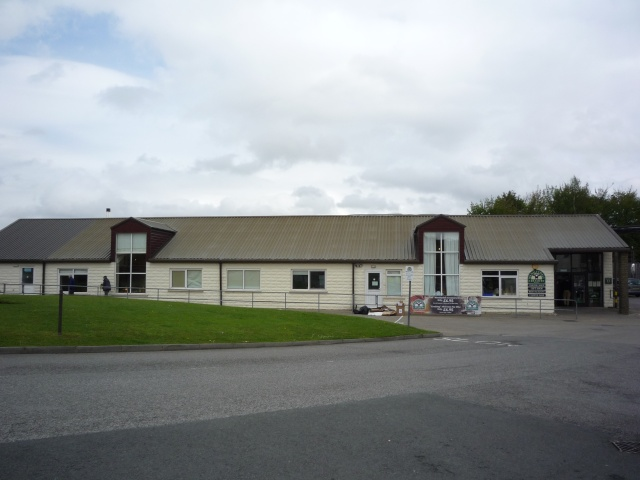
Wensleydale Creamery

Now the largest company, with a staff of 224 (spring 2018) and visited by 250,000 people each year, the Wensleydale Creamery Centre closed down in 1992; at that time, it was owned by Dairy Crest. Within six months, the former management team acquired the creamery and reopened it. The operation moved to its current location in 2015 and still handcrafts the eponymous cheese using traditional recipes following those first done by French monks in the 12th century. (Cheese has been made in this village since about 1150.) Wensleydale Creamery has won many prestigious cheese awards, including Supreme Champion in 2018 for its new Yorkshire Cheddar at The Great Yorkshire Show's Cheese and Dairy Show. Yorkshire Wensleydale took the Reserve Supreme Cheese title. The company also received ten other trophies.

The cheeses produced by the Creamery applied for Protected Food Name Status. The application was successful and the protected geographical indication certificate was received. The term "Yorkshire Wensleydale" can only be used for cheese that is made in Wensleydale.

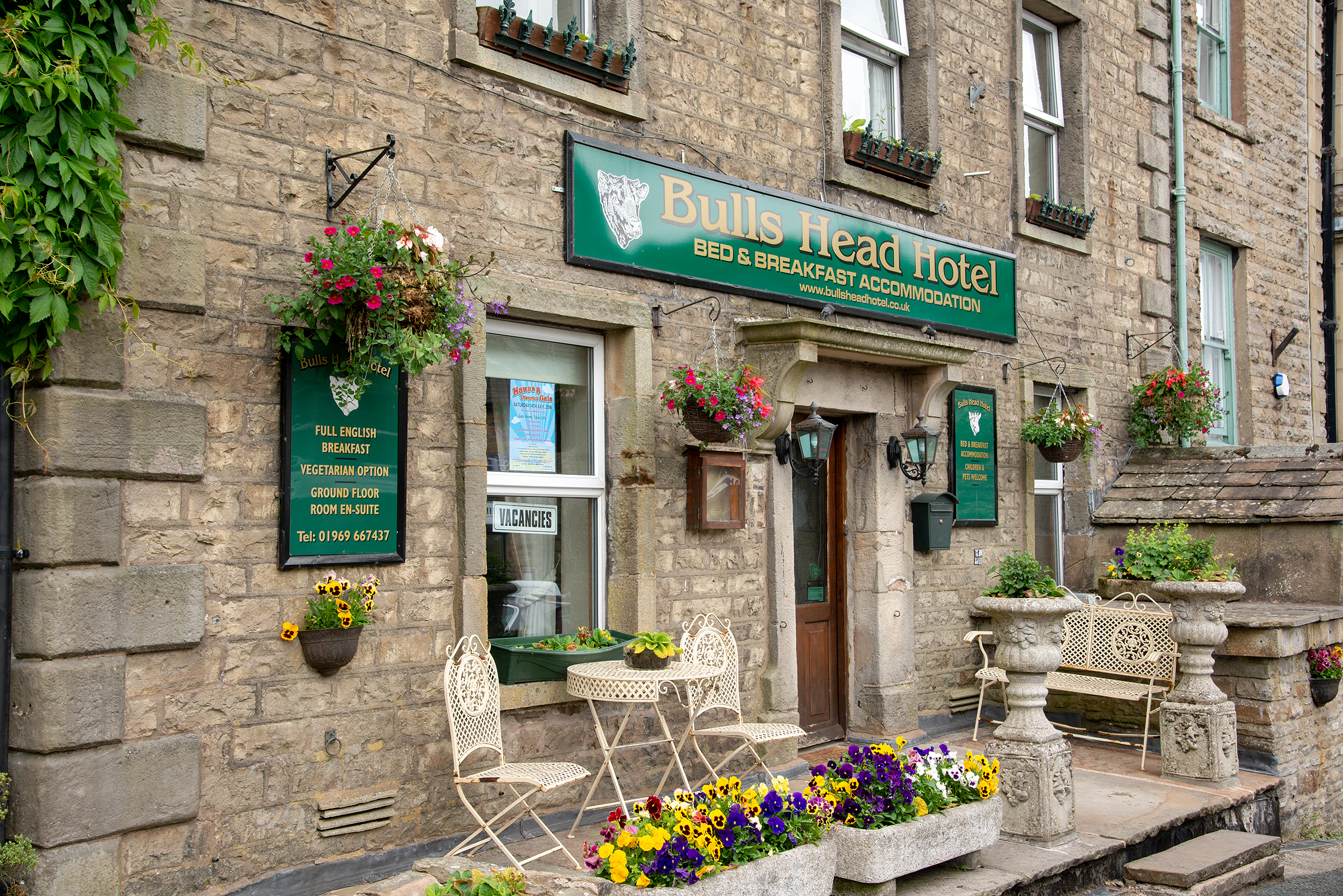
Hotel with rooms to let in Hawes

The farms around Hawes raise sheep and cattle and grow meadow grass for hay and silage. Tourism is important to Hawes; it is a market town with shops and accommodation for visitors. Over 40 farms in the general area supply the Creamery with milk. The annual Moorcock Show, centred on sheep farming, takes place at Mossdale, to the west of Hawes, in September each year.

A National Park Centre iLocal is located in the village, with a large parking area, beside the Countryside Museum. Attractions include the Dales Countryside Museum, attached to the old Hawes railway station of the Wensleydale Railway, nearby Hardraw Force waterfall, and the Buttertubs Pass which links Wensleydale to Swaledale. A market is held in Hawes Market Hall on Tuesdays, and there are many shops, pubs and tearooms. Hawes is a centre for walking (hiking) the countryside and the Pennine Way passes through here. There is a youth hostel located on Lancaster Terrace at the western end of the town.

The bookseller Steve Bloom was based in Hawes. His policy of charging a 50 pence entry fee to his shop made him nationally notorious.

Just south of Hawes, the 18th century Gayle Mill is now a Grade II listed building, a scheduled monument. In 2004, it was featured in BBC2's Restoration programme. It came in the top three in the national finals. Restoration of the mill started in the same year and works to bring the site to operational standard took four years and cost over £1 million. Although it was still open to visitors during the 2017 tourist season, the Gayle Mill Trust that operates the attraction was advised by the North of England Civic Trust in early 2018 that the mill would need to be closed. Work would be necessary to remedy problems discovered since the restoration in order to ensure safety and to comply with insurance regulations. The site was vacated in March 2018. The Civic Trust was hoping that the work could be completed in time to reopen it at Easter 2019. Fundraising was under way in summer 2018.

== Community amenities ==
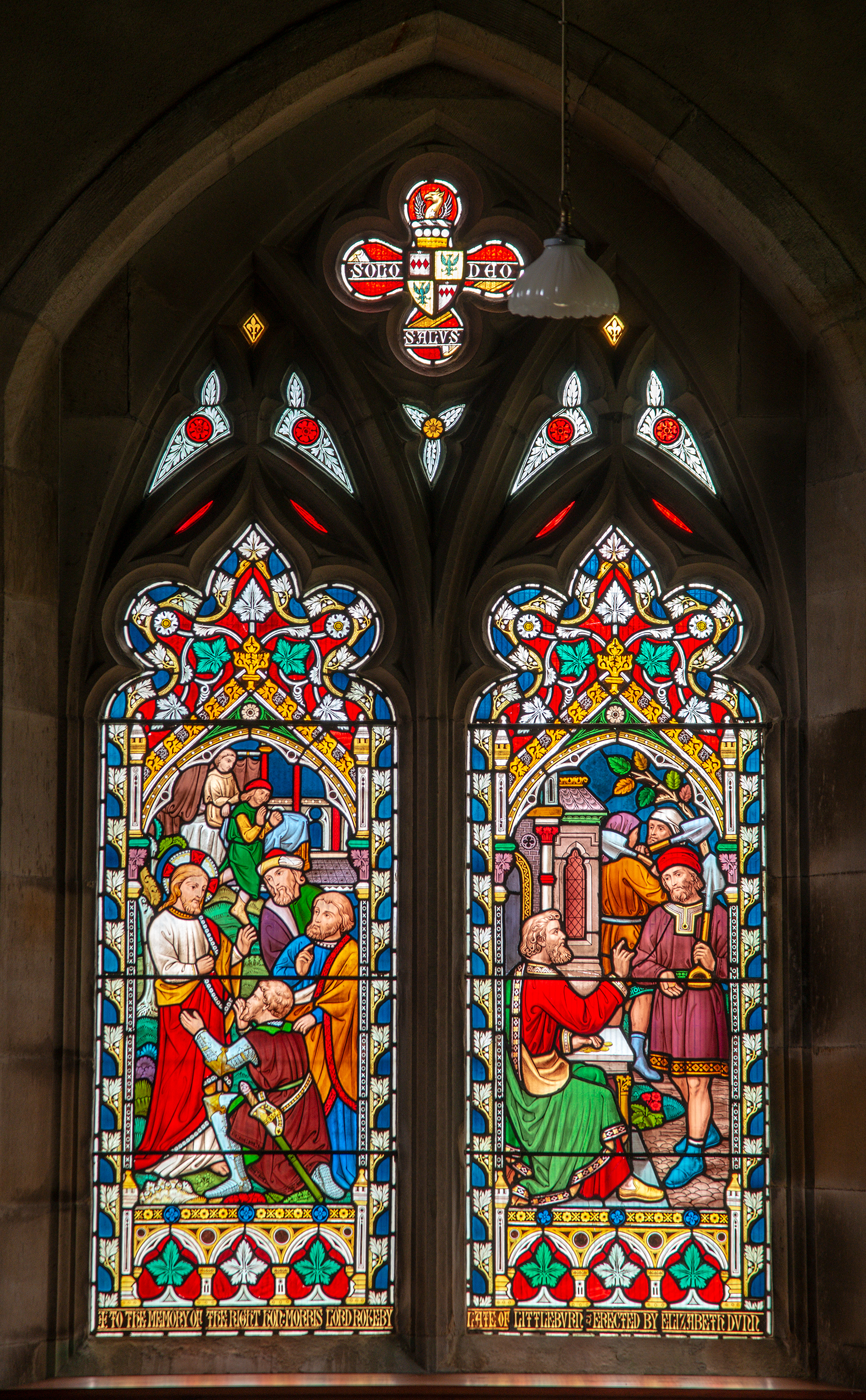
One of several stained glass windows at St Margaret's Church

Hawes Community Primary School provides primary education for the town and nearby settlements. It was established in 1878 and the school retains log books dating back to those dates. Pupils received secondary education at The Wensleydale School & Sixth Form in Leyburn. The Community School was rated as inadequate by an Ofsted report in late 2015; an action plan was established by North Yorkshire County Council to ensure improvement. In spring 2018, the school had 114 students.

The town has a retained fire station, which means that they are crewed by firefighters who provide on-call cover from home or their place of work. The station is operated by the North Yorkshire Fire and Rescue Service.

Medical care is available at the Hawes Surgery of The Health Centre. Three physicians serve this office and the one in Aysgarth. The nearest hospitals are Friary Community Hospital in Richmond (14.5 miles (23.4 km)) and Castleberg Hospital in Settle (17.8 miles (28.6 km)).

On weekends and bank holiday Mondays, the DalesBus travels among various villages, including Hawes, from Easter Sunday until late summer. Several other buses provide a year-round service stopping at Hawes and other villages in the area.

=== Saving village services ===
The only petrol station at Hawes was expected to close in 2017 due to falling sales, and the next nearest re-fuelling station involved a 36-mile (58 km) round trip. A non-profit community group, the Upper Dales Community Partnership (UDCP), took a three-year lease on the station October 2017 after North Yorkshire County Council awarded a grant to the community grant. The Dale Head Garage is so remote that the town receives a £0.05 rebate from the government on every litre of fuel sold. This benefit is passed on directly to consumers at the pump. A grant in May 2018 from the Richmondshire District Council's Economic Growth Fund enabled the petrol station to remain open 24 hours a day.

In previous years, UDCP had also taken over the library and the post office. In February 2018 however, Royal Mail announced that the sorting department in the village would close. In addition to the loss of jobs, the plan would have meant that residents would be required to drive 30 minutes to Leyburn to pick up packages. Lobbying by village residents convinced the Post Office to cancel its plans.

The Partnership also started a bus service in 2011 when the previous service ceased operation. The Little White Bus has 11 vehicles and transports 60,000 visitors per year. After the police station was shut down, the constables were given a room in the community group's office which houses the Post Office and Library, and also offers free Wi-Fi, a coffee machine and a scanner/printer for use by residents. In 2018, the Partnership was considering a plan to start a Land Trust that would build four new houses and rent them to low-income families with children.

Formed over 20 years ago, the Partnership has 25 paid staff and 60 volunteers (May 2018).

== Religion ==
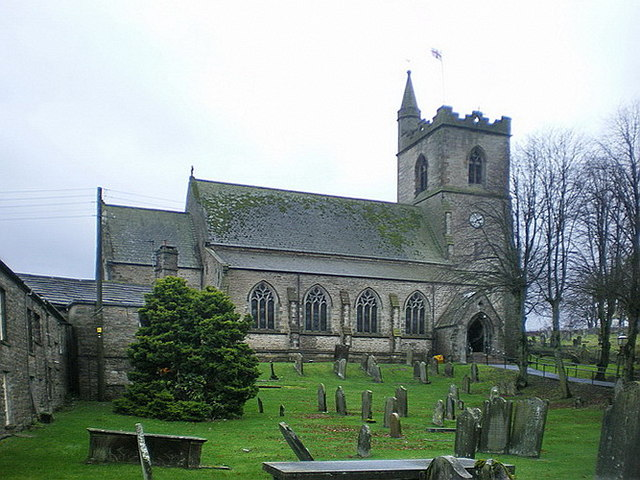
St Margaret's Church

The Anglican church in Hawes is dedicated to St Margaret of Antioch. The current building was rebuilt in 1850 on the site of the former chapel of ease and is a Grade II listed building. There were Wesleyan and Congregational chapels in the village as well as the Sandemanians and a Friends' Meeting House.

The Methodist Church in Hawes was built in 1856 and was part of the Wensleydale Circuit. It closed in 2015, was sold in early 2017, and placed again on the market in early 2018. Worshippers can attend the chapel in nearby Gayle. Chapel Gallery, an art gallery, is housed in a converted chapel.

== Media ==
Local news and television programmes are provided by BBC North East and Cumbria and ITV Tyne Tees. Television signals are received from the Bilsdale and local relay TV transmitters.

Local radio stations are BBC Radio York on 104.3 FM and community station Dales Radio on 103 FM.

The town is served by the local newspaper, The Westmorland Gazette.

== Demography ==
Population
Year	1881	1891	1901	1911	1921	1931	1951	1961	2001	2011
Total	1,890	1,615	1,595	1,518	1,430	1,404	1,196	1,137	1,127	1,137

=== 2001 census ===
The 2001 UK census showed that the population was split 50% male to 50% female. The religious constituency was made of 82% Christian, 1.5% Jewish and the rest stating no religion or not stating at all. The ethnic make-up was 97.9% White British, 1.3% White other, 0.5% Mixed ethnic and 0.3% Chinese. There were 601 dwellings.

=== 2011 census ===
The 2011 UK census showed that the population was split 50.1% male to 49.91% female. The religious constituency was made of 70.8% Christian, 3.8% Buddhist, 0.1% Muslim and the rest stating no religion or not stating at all. The ethnic make-up was 91.4% White British, 3.5% White Other, 0.3% Mixed Ethnic, 4.2% British Asian and 0.4% each British Black. There were 683 dwellings.

== Transport ==
Bus services are operated by Arriva North East, Coastliner, Lonsdale Buses, The Little White Bus and First Leeds.

== See also ==
- Listed buildings in Hawes
