= Dentdale =

Valley in Cumbria, England

Coordinates: 54.278°N 2.454°W

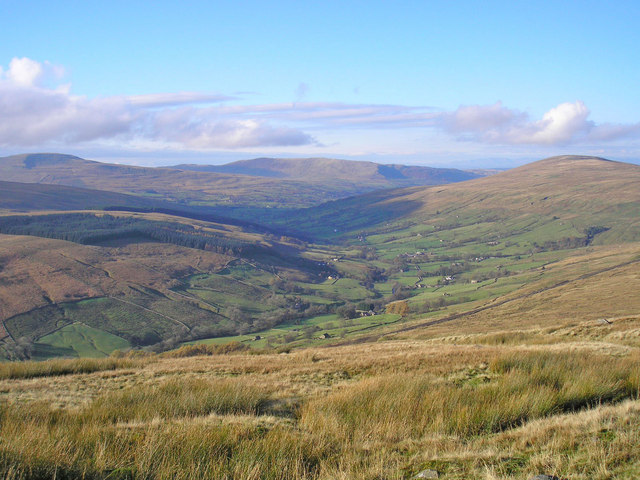
Dentdale

Dentdale is a dale or valley in the north-west of the Yorkshire Dales National Park in Cumbria, England. It is the valley of the River Dee, but takes its name from the village of Dent. The dale runs east to west, starting at Dent Head, which is the location of a railway viaduct on the Settle-Carlisle Line.

Dentdale is one of the few Yorkshire Dales that drain westwards to the Irish Sea.

== History ==
Dentdale was first settled in the 10th century when Norse invaders first entered the dale. The dale was also known to the Romans although there is no evidence of settlement during that period. The dale was one of the last of the Yorkshire Dales to be Enclosed in 1859.

The typical occupations in the dale were farming and worsted related. Several mills used the fast flowing waters of the River Dee to supply power to the mills. At least one of these was converted to the Dent Marble industry by 1810. Whilst fishing on the Dee at Dentdale in the 1840s, William Armstrong saw a waterwheel in action, supplying power to a marble quarry. It struck Armstrong that much of the available power was being wasted and it inspired him to design a successful hydraulic engine which began the accumulation of his wealth and industrial empire.

Dentdale was originally in the Ewecross wapentake of the West Riding of Yorkshire, but was transferred to Cumbria in 1974.

== Settlements ==
Dent village is the main shopping and social centre of the dale. There are two other major villages; Dent Head and Gawthrop. Additionally there are two hamlets at the top of the dale - Cowgill (where Dent Station is located) and Stone House. It has been noted that it is increasingly difficult for young people and family groups to stay in the dale as housing becomes more unaffordable.

There are over 200 listed buildings and structures in Dentdale which include the railway viaducts, bridges, barns, farmhouse, mileposts and even telephone boxes. Only one structure is Grade I listed, that of the Church of St Andrew in Dent.

== Transport ==
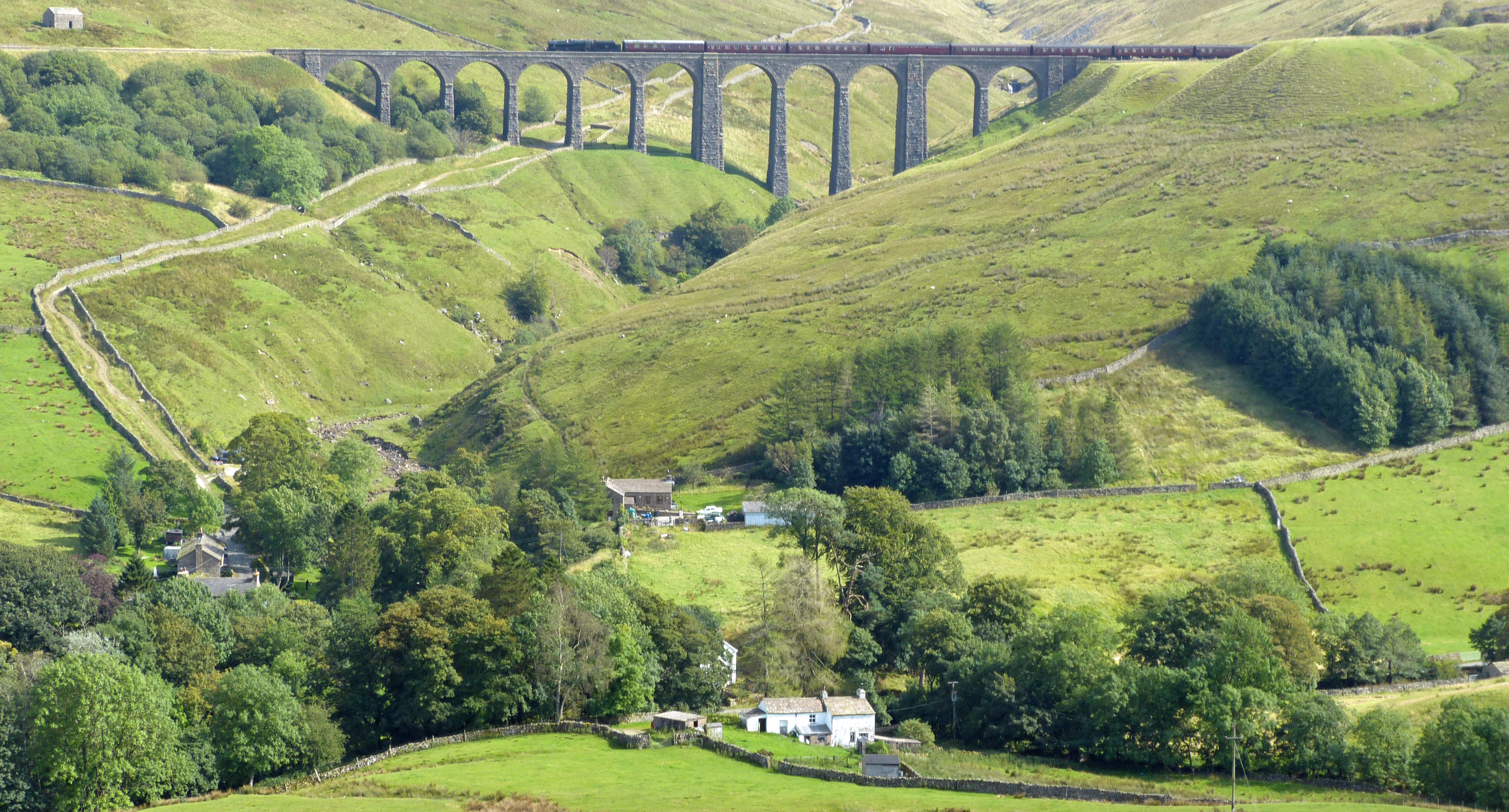
A steam train on the Arten Gill viaduct above Stonehouse

The famous Settle-Carlisle Line passes across the eastern edge of the dale being carried over the becks that feed the River Dee on Dent Head Viaduct and over Artengill Beck on Arten Gill Viaduct. (Note: Arten Gill Viaduct is the spelling from the railway even though the water below is Artengill.)

The walking route of the Dales Way crosses through the dale in a rough east/west axis. The route and the seclusion of the dale make it popular with walkers and lovers of The Dales.

National Cycle route 68 (also known as the Pennine Cycleway) that runs from Derbyshire to Berwick-upon-Tweed passes through the dale.

The C5101 road runs through the dale from the nearest main road at Sedbergh (the A683 and A684) to Newby Head Moss, east of the dale head, where it meets the B6255 Hawes to Ingleton road.

Western Dales Bus operate a year round Saturday and summer Sunday service between Dent station and Sedbergh with stops en route.

== Geology ==
The Dent Fault cuts across the valley close to the village of Gawthrop, marking a geological boundary between the Carboniferous Limestone of Deepdale and the Craven Dales to the south and the older Silurian and Ordovician rocks of the Howgill Fells to the north.

The Upper Dentdale Cave System, which is 2 miles (3.2 km) east of Dent, was recognized as a site of Special Scientific Interest (SSSI) in 1998. The cave system extends for 1 mile (1.6 km) beneath the valley floor under the River Dee and is notable for providing a unique insight into how caves are formed in valley floors.

Dent Marble was quarried and polished in Dentdale between 1760 and 1909. Both the viaducts that carry the Settle-Carlisle line over the dale are constructed from Dent Marble. The opening of the railway afforded the opportunity to export the marble out of the dale for the first time. The stone is not actually marble, it is a highly polished form of Black Limestone.
