= Listed buildings in Dent, Cumbria =

Dent is a civil parish in Westmorland and Furness, Cumbria, England. It contains 203 listed buildings that are recorded in the National Heritage List for England. Of these, one is listed at Grade I, the highest of the three grades, four are at Grade II*, the middle grade, and the others are at Grade II, the lowest grade. The parish is in the Yorkshire Dales National Park, it contains the villages of Dent, Gawthrop and Cowgill, and is otherwise completely rural. The large majority of the listed buildings are farmhouses, farm buildings, houses and associated structures. The Settle–Carlisle line of the former Midland Railway runs through the parish, and structures associated with this are listed, including two viaducts and station buildings. The other listed buildings in the parish include churches and associated structures, bridges, public houses, shops, a boundary stone, a former water mill, limekilns, a series of milestones, a former school, monuments, a war memorial, and telephone kiosks.

== Key ==
Grade	Criteria
I	Buildings of exceptional interest, sometimes considered to be internationally important
II*	Particularly important buildings of more than special interest
II	Buildings of national importance and special interest

== Buildings ==
Name and location	Photograph	Date	Notes	Grade
St Andrew's Church; 54.27815°N 2.45416°W		12th century (probable)	The tower was added in about 1785, the church was restored in 1889–90 by Paley, Austin and Paley, and it is mainly in Perpendicular style. It is built in stone with quoins, the nave has a stone-slate roof, and the roofs of the aisles are in copper. The church consists of a nave with a clerestory and a chancel in one range, north and south aisles, a south porch, and a west tower with an embattled parapet.	I
High Hall Farmhouse; 54.28326°N 2.45645°W		1625	The farmhouse was rebuilt in 1665. It is in stone with a stone-slate roof, and two storeys. The house has a T-shaped plan, consisting of a main range of four bays, a narrow single-bay extension to the east, a large rear wing, and two lean-to additions. On the front is a doorway with a 20th-century porch, casement windows, and a replaced inscribed and dated plaque. In the extension is a mullioned window, and there are more mullioned windows at the rear. Also in the rear wing is a wagon doorway, and the chimneys have cylindrical shafts.	II*
Fletchers Farmhouse; 54.27490°N 2.36673°W	—	Early 17th century (probable) (or earlier)	A farmhouse, now derelict, in sandstone with through stones, quoins, and a roof mainly of stone-slate. There are two storeys, two unequal bays, and an attached barn to the west. On the front is a ruined gabled porch, and windows, some of which are mullioned and others are fixed. In the barn is a wagon doorway and windows.	II
Hud's House and barn 54.27674°N 2.38247°W		Early 17th century (probable)	A farmhouse, later a private house, that was remodelled in the late 17th or early 18th century, in stone with a stone-slate roof. It has an L-shaped plan, consisting of a three-bay main range, with two outshuts and a long barn range at the rear. The house has two storeys, and on the front is a large two-storey porch with a narrow square-headed entrance over which is a cornice, and containing stone benches. The windows vary, and at the left is a large projecting chimney stack. The barn contains a doorway with a cornice, a blocked loading door, and a window.	II
Brackensgill and barn 54.29831°N 2.51448°W		17th century (possible)	The farmhouse was extended and a barn added in the 18th and 19th centuries. The farmhouse and barn are in stone with a stone-slate roof. The house has two storeys, two bays, and an extension and outshut at the rear. On the front is a gabled porch and sash windows, and at the rear are small windows and a stair window. To the left is a five-bay barn containing a square-headed doorway, a sash window, and a square-headed wagon entrance.	II
Barn, Burton Hill Farm; 54.30330°N 2.50454°W	—	17th century (probable)	The building includes a barn, a cart shed and a shippon, and forms an L-shaped plan. It is in stone with quoins, and has a roof partly of slate and partly of stone-slate. The openings include wagon doorways, smaller doorways, windows of varying types, and in the south gable is a four-tiered pigeon-cote.	II
Barn south of Gale Garth Farmhouse; 54.29936°N 2.51627°W	—	17th century (probable)	Originally a farmhouse and later a barn, it is in sandstone in the lower part and in blue ragstone above, and has through stones, quoins, and a stone-slate roof. Its openings include a mullioned window, square windows, a square-headed doorway, and a loading door.	II
Barn, Hacra Farm; 54.29031°N 2.46929°W	—	17th century (probable)	This consists of two barns, the later dating from the early 18th century, and a shippon probably added in the 19th century. It is in sandstone with quoins and stone-slate roofs. The building has a linear plan, is composed of two ranges, and has probably five bays. Features include wagon doorways with segmental heads, other doorways, mullioned windows, ventilation slits, and external steps leading the loft doors.	II
Oliver Bridge; 54.28118°N 2.47362°W	—	17th century (probable)	The bridge carries Brackensgill Lane over Oliver Beck. It is in stone, and consists of a single, small, almost semicircular arch with voussoirs, and parapets with rounded coping.	II
Stonehouse Bridge; 54.26828°N 2.35341°W		17th century (probable)	The bridge, which was enlarged in the 18th and 19th centuries, carries a road over the River Dee. It is in sandstone, and consists of a single segmental arch with voussoirs, a stone-slate band, and parapets with rounded coping.	II
Woods; 54.25215°N 2.41960°W		17th century	A disused farmhouse and attached barn in sandstone with quoins and a stone-slate roof. The house has two storeys and three bays, and a large porch on the front. The barn to the right has three bays, and a lean-to extension at the rear with a corrugated iron roof.	II
Basil Busk; 54.27285°N 2.41349°W		Mid to late 17th century (probable)	This was extended twice, forming a farmhouse and a cottage, and later combined into one dwelling. It is in stone with quoins and a stone-slate roof. There are two storeys, six bays, and two rear outshuts. The house is in three parts, each with two bays. The oldest part is on the left and has a square-headed doorway, casement windows and a fire window in the ground floor, and mullioned windows above. In the central part is a gabled porch, sash windows and one fixed window, and in the right part are fixed windows in the ground floor, one with a dated and initialled lintel, a slate hood mould, and sash windows in the upper floor.	II
Burton Hill Farmhouse and outbuilding 54.30321°N 2.50479°W	—	Mid to late 17th century (probable)	The building is in stone on a plinth, with a roof partly of green slate and partly of stone-slate. The farmhouse has two storeys and five bays, a rear outshut and an attached outbuilding to the east. On the front of the house is a gabled porch with a ball finial, a segmental-headed outed doorway and a square-headed inner doorway. The windows are in a variety of types, including mullioned windows with hood moulds. The outbuilding has a square-headed doorway, a window, and a lean-to.	II*
Barn, Scotchergill Farm; 54.27819°N 2.43168°W	—	Mid to late 17th century (probable)	The barn is in stone with quoins and a stone-slate roof. It has a rectangular plan, and contains a segmental-headed wagon doorway with voussoirs, square windows, and small ventilation slits.	II
Old Vicarage and Parsonage; 54.27715°N 2.45469°W	—	1673	The building has been divided into two dwellings, and is in stone with a stone-slate roof. There are two storeys, and an irregular plan, with a two bay extension to the rear. The former parsonage has a square-headed doorway, above which is a dated and initialled lintel. There is a casement window to the left and mullioned windows above. To the right is a higher extension with a mullioned window and a sash window. The former vicarage to the left has a square-headed window and a porch, and to the left is a tall window.	II
Blands Farmhouse; 54.27471°N 2.39944°W		Late 17th century (probable)	A small stone farmhouse with large quoins and a stone-slate roof. There are two storeys, two bays, and a small outshut at the rear. On the front is a doorway with the remains of a gabled porch. Most of the windows are fixed with opening lights, there are the remains of a mullioned window, and at the rear is a doorway and two small windows.	II
Blea Beck; 54.29163°N 2.46879°W	—	Late 17th century (probable)	A small farmhouse with a barn added in the 18th century, now in a derelict condition. It is in sandstone with through-stones, quoins, and a stone-slate roof. The house has a single bay and two storeys, and the barn to the east has a single bay. On the front in the ground floor is a blocked doorway, a fire window and a blocked window, and in the upper floor are two windows, one of which is blocked. At the rear is a doorway and windows, some of which are blocked.	II
East Stonehouse; 54.26760°N 2.35180°W		Late 17th century (probable)	A farmhouse, later a private house, that was extended in the 19th century. It is in sandstone with quoins and a stone-slate roof. There are two storeys, two bays, a single-bay extension to the west, and former outbuildings at the east end. The house has a square-headed doorway, and windows of various types, including sash and casement windows.	II
Geslings; 54.27292°N 2.45143°W	—	Late 17th century (probable)	Originally a farmhouse and barn, later converted into a single dwelling. It is in sandstone with quoins and a stone-slate roof. There are two storeys with an attic, and four bays. On the front is a gabled porch with segmental-headed outer and inner doorways, and most of the windows are mullioned with hood moulds.	II
Hacker Gill Farmhouse; 54.27048°N 2.39657°W	—	Late 17th century (probable)	A sandstone farmhouse with a stone-slate roof and two storeys. There are three bays, an integral outhouse to the east and a rear outshut. The windows are sashes.	II
Hacra Farmhouse; 54.29043°N 2.46967°W	—	Late 17th century (probable)	The farmhouse was extended later. It is in stone with quoins and a stone-slate roof. There are two storeys, the original part has three bays, the extension to the left has one bay, and at the rear is a full height outshut. On the front is a lean-to porch, and most of the windows are sash windows. At the rear is a former mullioned window without its mullion.	II
Hall Bank Farmhouse; 54.28126°N 2.44331°W	—	Late 17th century (probable)	The farmhouse is in stone with quoins and a stone-slate roof. There are two storeys, it is built into a hillside at the rear, and there are four bays. On the front are two doorways and one sash window, the other windows being casements.	II
High Barth and barn 54.28743°N 2.46753°W	—	Late 17th century (probable)	A farmhouse and barn that were rebuilt in the 19th century. The building is in sandstone with quoins and a stone-slate roof. The house has two storeys, three bays, an almost continuous full height outshut, and a barn to the west. It contains a square-headed doorway and square mullioned windows. The barn has two low storeys, a square-headed wagon doorway, square windows, and external steps leading to a loft door.	II
Lunds Farmhouse; 54.29354°N 2.47070°W		Late 17th century (probable)	A stone farmhouse with quoins and a stone-slate roof. There are two storeys, four bays, a gabled rear wing, and a lean-to in the angle. On the front is a gabled porch with a square-headed doorway and a hood mould. To the left is a Venetian-style window with chamfered mullions and a hood mould. The other windows are a mix of sashes and casements, and at the rear is a stair window.	II
Scotchergill Farmhouse; 54.27852°N 2.43162°W	—	Late 17th century (probable)	A farmhouse and store, remodelled in the 19th century, in sandstone, the front roughcast, with quoins and a stone-slate roof. The building has a T-shaped plan, consisting of a two-storey three-bay main range, and a rear outshut continuing as a store. On the front is a doorway with a canopy and sash windows. In the outshut are former mullioned windows with the mullions missing, and a stair window.	II
Sportsman's Inn; 54.27207°N 2.35754°W		Late 17th century (probable)	Originally a farmhouse, it was extended in the 18th century, and later used as a public house. The inn is in stone, the earlier part on a boulder plinth, with quoins and a stone-slate roof. There are two storeys, two bays in the earlier part, and four in the later part. The doorway is in the later part, and has a narrow fanlight. The windows on the front are sashes, and at the rear is a former mullioned window without its mullion.	II
Stone Close Café and barn 54.27827°N 2.45529°W		Late 17th century (probable)	Originally two cottages, later combined into a café with living accommodation, and a barn attached to the left. They are in stone on a plinth, with quoins and a stone-slate roof. The cottages have two storeys and two bays each. Towards the centre are two square-headed doorways. The windows vary, and include a large shop window and casement windows imitating sashes. The barn has three bays, a doorway, a segmental-headed wagon entrance with voussoirs, and ventilation slits.	II
West Stonehouse Farmhouse and wall 54.26841°N 2.35226°W	—	Late 17th century (probable)	The farmhouse was extended in the 18th century and again in the 19th century. It is in stone with quoins and has a stone-slate roof. There are two storeys and three bays, each bay from a different phase of building. On the front is a porch, and the windows are casements. In front of the farmhouse is a low stone wall with a gateway. In the wall to the right of the gateway is a reset lintel containing an initialled and dated panel.	II
Hill; 54.27812°N 2.36957°W		1681	A sandstone farmhouse with a stone-slate roof, and two storeys. There are three bays, an added bay to the east, and a continuous lean-to outshut at the rear with a corrugated sheet roof. Above the doorway is a pitched canopy, and the windows are sashes. In the upper floor is a rectangular datestone.	II
High House; 54.27641°N 2.47348°W	—	1687	A sandstone farmhouse with quoins and a stone-slate roof. There are two storeys and six bays. On the front is a gabled porch with a segmental-headed outer doorway. The windows on the front are either mullioned, or have a single light with a rounded head. At the rear is a small lean-to porch.	II*
Biggerside Farmhouse; 54.28435°N 2.46205°W	—	1690	A sandstone farmhouse with quoins, a stone-slate roof, and an L-shaped plan, consisting of a main range and a wide rear wing. There are two storeys and four bays. In the centre is a gabled porch with an initialled and dated lintel, and in front of it is a semicircular step and a pebble pavement. The ground floor contains sash windows, and in the upper floor the windows are casements. The chimneys have cylindrical shafts.	II*
Harber Gill Farmhouse; 54.27612°N 2.36330°W	—	1700	The farmhouse is in sandstone with quoins, a slate roof, and two storeys. It has a T-shaped plan, consisting of a three-bay main block and a wide outshut at the rear. On the front is a gabled porch with chamfered jambs, and a lintel containing an initialled and dated panel. There are hood moulds above the windows in both floors.	II
2 Queens Square; 54.27754°N 2.45391°W	—	Late 17th or early 18th century (probable)	A farmhouse, later a private house, in stone with a roof partly of slate and partly of stone-slate. There are two low storeys, four bays, and a rear wing. It has a gabled porch and casement windows.	II
Barras House; 54.28005°N 2.47145°W	—	Late 17th or early 18th century (probable)	A farmhouse and shippon in stone with quoins and a stone-slate roof. There are two storeys, four bays, and a small lean-to extension at the rear. In the front is a doorway with a three-light window to the left, a three-light mullioned window to the right, and casement windows in the upper floor. In the shippon are three small square windows, and in front of the house is a mounting block.	II
Blake Rigg; 54.25797°N 2.41952°W	—	Late 17th or early 18th century	A farmhouse, later a private house, in stone with quoins and a stone-slate roof. There are two storeys, four bays, and a full height outshut at the rear. On the front is a gabled porch. Most of the windows are sashes, and there are some mullioned windows.	II
Broadfield House and Farmhouse; 54.27445°N 2.40081°W		Late 17th or early 18th century (probable)	The farmhouse was extended in the 19th century, and has been divided into two dwellings. It is in stone with quoins, the earlier part has a roof of stone-slate, and the later part has rusticated quoins and a slate roof. There are two storeys and eight bays. The first two bays are higher, project forward, and contain a sill band, an eaves cornice, and in the right bay is a Tuscan porch. The other two bays contain a gabled porch, and most of the windows in all the bays are sashes.	II
Burton's; 54.25909°N 2.42758°W		Late 17th or early 18th century	A farmhouse with an attached outbuilding in limestone and sandstone, with quoins and a stone-slate roof. There are two low storeys and three bays. The doorway has quoined jambs and a flat head with voussoirs. Most of the windows are mullioned, there is a fire window with a segmental head, and in the outbuilding is a first floor loading door.	II
Barn, Combe House; 54.28226°N 2.49049°W	—	Late 17th or early 18th century (probable)	The barn, which was altered in the late 18th century, was originally partly residential. It is in ragstone with some sandstone, and has quoins and a slate roof. The building has a linear plan, two storeys, and is in two unequal parts. Its openings include a wagon entrance, doorways, some of which are blocked, and windows.	II
Coventree Farmhouse and house 54.26930°N 2.43821°W	—	Late 17th or early 18th century (probable)	The farmhouse was added to the north in the late 18th century. Both parts are in stone with quoins, stone-slate roofs, and two storeys. The older part has two bays, a square-headed doorway with a projecting lintel, and windows, most of which are fixed. The later part is higher, with a symmetrical front of three bays and a large L-shaped rear outshut. In the centre is a gabled porch, the windows are sashes, and at the rear is a stair window.	II
Cow Dub Farmhouse and barn 54.27184°N 2.35728°W	—	Late 17th or early 18th century (probable)	The house is in random rubble, and the barn is in sandstone, both have quoins and a roof mainly of stone-slate with some blue slate. The house has two storeys and a gabled wing to the right. The doorway is in the gable end, with a rectangular window to the right and a sash window above. The barn is to the left, and has a single storey, two doorways and a window.	II
Deepdale Head Farmhouse; 54.24438°N 2.42197°W	—	Late 17th or early 18th century (probable)	The farmhouse is in stone with a stone-slate roof and two storeys. It has a T-shaped plan, consisting of a main range of four bays, a rear wing, and a two-bay south extension. In the centre of the main range is a gabled porch with square-headed doorways, and the windows are mullioned. The extension contains a square-headed doorway and casement windows.	II
East Banks Farmhouse; 54.27201°N 2.44719°W	—	Late 17th or early 18th century	The farmhouse is in stone on a plinth, and has a stone-slate roof. It has a T-shaped plan, consisting of a main range, a large rear outshut, and lean-to extension to the left. On the front is a square-headed doorway, a sash window and a fire window to the left, and a casement window to the right, and in the upper floor are sash windows.	II
Edmonson's; 54.27770°N 2.45404°W	—	Late 17th or early 18th century (probable)	A stone cottage with a stone-slate roof on a sloping site. There are two storeys at the front and three at the rear, and three bays. There is a square-headed doorway, and most of the windows are mullioned.	II
Ellers; 54.29193°N 2.49385°W		Late 17th or early 18th century (probable)	A former farmhouse in stone with a stone-slate roof. There are two storeys with a basement, three bays, an outbuilding on the right, and a lean-to extension at the rear. On the front is a gabled porch. Most of the windows are sashes, and there is also a fire window on the front, and square windows and a stair window at the rear.	II
Ewegales Bridge; 54.27696°N 2.37673°W		Late 17th or early 18th century (probable)	The bridge carries a road over the River Dee. It is in sandstone, and consists of a single low segmental arch with voussoirs. The parapets have rounded copings and are splayed at the ends.	II
Far End Cottage and barn 54.28045°N 2.47160°W	—	Late 17th or early 18th century (probable)	A small farmhouse with an attached barn, it is in stone with quoins and a stone-slate roof. There are two storeys and two bays, with the barn continuing to the west. On the front is a gabled porch. The windows vary, and include a horizontally-sliding sash window. The barn contains a wagon entrance, a loading door, and a doorway converted into a window.	II
Gibbs Hall; 54.27248°N 2.40791°W		Late 17th or early 18th century	A farmhouse, now derelict and a roofless ruin, it is in sandstone with quoins and some through stones. There are two storeys, three bays, and a staircase outshut at the rear. On the front are the remains of a gabled porch, and the windows are without glazing or joinery; two windows in the outshut are mullioned.	II
Gawthrop Hall; 54.28024°N 2.47221°W	—	Late 17th or early 18th century (probable)	A farmhouse and adjoining cottage in stone with a stone-slate roof. There are two storeys, and a T-shaped plan, consisting of a main range with the cottage to the west, and a rear wing. The farmhouse has four bays, and the cottage has two. Both the farmhouse and the cottage have gabled porches, and most of the windows are mullioned, with a stair window in the rear wing. In the front of the cottage are two tiers of pigeon holes.	II
Hobstones; 54.28070°N 2.47316°W	—	Late 17th or early 18th century (probable)	A farmhouse and barn converted into a single dwelling, it is in stone with a stone-slate roof. There are two storeys, the former farmhouse has four bays, the former barn is to the left, and there is a lean-to extension at the rear. On the front is a square-headed doorway with a canopy, and the windows are sashes.	II
Hodgson's cottage and smithy 54.27804°N 2.45346°W		Late 17th or early 18th century	This consists of a house with a former warehouse, later converted for domestic use, and a smithy. It is in stone with quoins and a stone-slate roof. The building has a T-shaped plan, with the former warehouse forming a gabled wing to the west, and the smithy attached to the north. There are two storeys, the original house has sash windows, and in the wing and the smithy the windows are fixed.	II
Little Town; 54.27322°N 2.38978°W		Late 17th or early 18th century (probable)	A farmhouse, later a private house, it is in sandstone with a stone-slate roof. There are two storeys, four bays, and a gabled wing at the rear. On the front is a square-headed doorway and sash windows, and at the rear are two mullioned windows that have lost their mullions, and two stair windows.	II
Barn north of Lunds Farmhouse; 54.29442°N 2.47064°W		Late 17th or early 18th century (probable)	Originally a farmhouse with attached barn, later used totally as a barn, it is in stone with large quoins, and has a roof partly of slate and partly of stone-slate. It has a rectangular plan, the north part originally being the farmhouse, and there is a lean-to extension to the south.	II
Mill Beck and barn 54.27801°N 2.46314°W	—	Late 17th or early 18th century (probable)	A farmhouse and barn, now converted into a single dwelling, in stone with quoins and a stone-slate roof. There are two storeys, four bay, two gabled wing at the rear with an outshut between them, and the barn to the south. On the front of the house is a gabled porch, and the windows are of varying types. The former barn has two doorways, one blocked, and a ventilation slit on the front, and two wagon doorways at the rear.	II
Mill Dam House with barns 54.28128°N 2.47243°W	—	Late 17th or early 18th century	A farmhouse with a barn attached at each end, it is in stone with quoins and a stone-slate roof. The farmhouse has two storeys with an attic, five bays, and a rear wing with a lean-to in the angle. There is a square-headed doorway and the windows are casements. The barn to the left is at the same level, and contains a wagon doorway and a stable door. The barn to the right is lower, and has a lean-to on the front and a wagon doorway.	II
Mire House; 54.29759°N 2.49561°W		Late 17th or early 18th century (probable)	A farmhouse, later a private house, in stone with quoins and a stone-slate roof. There are two storeys, a main part of four bays, an extension to the right, and a full height outshut at the rear. On the front is a gabled porch with a square-headed doorway and a datestone. Most of the windows are sashes, and above the ground floor windows are hood moulds. In the extension is a garage door.	II
Moser Hill Farmhouse and shippons 54.30583°N 2.52431°W	—	Late 17th or early 18th century	The farmhouse and shippons are in stone with quoins and a stone-slate roof with some blue slate. The building has an L-shaped plan, with a three-bay main range, an outshut at the rear, a shippon at the east end, and a wing to the south of that. The house has two storeys, a porch and a wide doorway, and most of the windows are casements, with one sash window. In one of the shippons is a wagon doorway.	II
Barn, Moser Hill Farm; 54.30597°N 2.52459°W	—	Late 17th or early 18th century (probable)	A shippon was added to the rear in the 19th century. The building is in stone with quoins with a stone-slate roof. The barn has a rectangular plan with four bays, and the shippon is added to the north. The building contains a wagon doorway with a porch, shippon doors with segmental heads and voussoirs and a loft doorway.	II
Old Post Office; 54.27842°N 2.45587°W	—	Late 17th or early 18th century (probable)	Originally a farmhouse, later a private house, it is in sandstone with quoins and a stone-slate roof. There are two storeys and three bays. On the front is a gabled porch, the windows are sashes, and at the rear is a stair window.	II
Barn opposite Rash House; 54.30365°N 2.52117°W		Late 17th or early 18th century (probable)	A bank barn in stone with quoins and a stone-slate roof. It has a T-shaped plan, consisting of a five-bay main range, a one-bay extension to the north, and a gabled wing to the west. The barn contains a wagon doorway with a porch, smaller doorways, windows, loading doors, and ventilation slits.	II
Rash Mill Cottage and barn 54.30297°N 2.52506°W		Late 17th or early 18th century (probable)	A farmhouse and barn in stone, with roofs mainly of green slate and some stone-slate. The buildings form a U-shaped plan, consisting of a two-storey two-bay farmhouse, a single-storey wing projecting to the right, and the barn forming a cross-wing to the left. On the front of the farmhouse is a gabled porch and a square-headed doorway, and various windows including a sash window. The wing has a stable door and windows including two casements. The barn has a blocked segmental-headed wagon doorway, a shippon doorway, and two outshuts.	II
Raw Ridding Farmhouse and barn 54.29370°N 2.47361°W		Late 17th or early 18th century	The building was enlarged in the mid to late 18th century. It is in sandstone with quoins and a stone-slate roof. The house has two storeys and a cruciform plan, consisting of a three-bay main range, a large two-storey porch on the front, and a rear wing with a lean-to in the angle. Also on the front are another doorway and windows, some of which are square and others are casements. The barn has a segmental-headed wagon doorway, a smaller doorway, a window and a projecting single-storey wing.	II
Roantree; 54.29541°N 2.46472°W		Late 17th or early 18th century (probable)	A small farmhouse with a barn added in the 19th century, now disused. It is in stone with quoins and a stone-slate roof. The building has a linear plan, consisting of a two-storey two-bay farmhouse with a one-bay shippon to the right, and a two-bay barn to the right of that.	II
Tofts Farmhouse; 54.28564°N 2.48960°W	—	Late 17th or early 18th century (probable)	The farmhouse was extended later in the 18th century. It is in stone with quoins and a stone-slate roof. There are two storeys and four bays. In the earlier part to the left is a tall single-storey porch that has an arched doorway with a chamfered surround, and above it is a blind round-headed window with roundels in the spandrels. To the right is a smaller gabled porch. The windows are in varying types.	II
Tub Hole; 54.26882°N 2.41234°W		Late 17th or early 18th century (probable)	Originally a farmhouse, later used for other purposes, it is in stone with quoins and a stone-slate roof. It has two storeys and an L-shaped plan. consisting of a main range of three bays, and a rear wing with a lean-to extension. On the front is a small gabled porch, and the windows contain altered glazing.	II
Underwood; 54.28419°N 2.47939°W	—	Late 17th or early 18th century (probable)	A former farmhouse with a barn to the left that has been converted into dwellings. The building is in stone with quoins and a stone-slate roof. The farmhouse has two storeys and three bays, with an outshut at the rear and a lean-to in the angle. It has a gabled porch, and the windows contain replaced glazing. The barn to the left has a rear wing, and it contains a square-headed doorway, two square windows and a round-headed window. In the rear outshut is a two-light mullioned window.	II
West Clint Farmhouse and barn 54.26836°N 2.40332°W		Late 17th or early 18th century (probable)	The farmhouse and barn are in stone with quoins and stone-slate roofs. The house has two storeys and two bays, and a lean-to extension to the right. On the front is a gabled porch, and the windows are sashes. The barn to the left has two segmental-headed wagon entrances with voussoirs, one of which is blocked, a doorway, and a square window.	II
The Wool Shop; 54.27746°N 2.45433°W		Late 17th or early 18th century (probable)	A house, then a shop, in stone with a stone-slate roof, it has two storeys and four bays. Above the doorway is a large stone lintel with decorative carving. The door is flanked by shop windows, and the other windows on the front are sashes. At the rear are windows of varying types, including a mullioned window.	II
West View and Cobble Cottage; 54.27803°N 2.45478°W	—	Late 17th or early 18th century	A pair of sandstone cottages with quoins and a stone-slate roof. They have two storeys and three bays. Each cottage has a square-headed doorway that has a large lintel with a simple hood mould. West Cottage, on the left, has a small square window and casement windows imitating sashes, and the windows in Cobble Cottage are sashes.	II
Cowgill Bridge; 54.27753°N 2.37578°W	—	1702	The bridge carries a road over the River Dee. It is in sandstone, and consists of a single low segmental arch with voussoirs, bands, and parapets that are splayed at the west end. On the north parapet is a datestone.	II
West Cowgill Farmhouse; 54.27938°N 2.37505°W		1705	The farmhouse is in stone with quoins and a slate roof. There are two storeys, two wide bays, a rear wing at the right, and two outshuts in the angle. On the front is a gabled porch that has an outer doorway with a shaped, initialled and dated lintel. The windows are mullioned, and some of the mullions are missing.	II
Acre Farmhouse and farm buildings 54.27635°N 2.39865°W	—	1711	A farmhouse with a house added later, now integrated into one dwelling, with outbuildings on both ends. They are in sandstone with quoins and a stone-slate roof. The house has two storeys, the original part has four bays and a rear wing, and the later part has two bays. On the front of the original part is a porch that has a doorway with a shaped lintel, decorated, initialled and dated. Some of the windows are mullioned, and some have hood moulds. The outbuildings are narrow, and each contains a doorway.	II
Allen Haw and barn 54.27605°N 2.39152°W		Early 18th century	The farmhouse and barn are in stone with a stone-slate roof. The house has two storeys, two bays, and an outshut. On the front is a gabled porch and fixed windows with opening lights. The barn has a wagon doorway and a smaller doorway.	II
Backstone Gill Cottage; 54.27916°N 2.43743°W	—	Early 18th century (probable)	A stone house with quoins and a green slate roof. There are two storeys, two bays, and a combined porch and outshut with a stone-slate roof on the front. Most of the windows are casements.	II
Birchentree Farmhouse; 54.27097°N 2.39503°W		Early 18th century	The farmhouse is in stone with quoins, a stone-slate roof, and two storeys. It has an L-shaped plan, consisting of a main range and a gabled rear wing. The main range has four bays and a single-bay extension at the east end. In the centre of the main range is a gabled porch, there is a small round-headed window on each floor and casement windows, and in the extension is a doorway, a sash window and a casement window. At the rear are various windows, including one that is mullioned.	II
Brookside; 54.28055°N 2.47264°W	—	Early 18th century (probable)	A small stone house with quoins and a stone-slate roof. There are two low storeys and three bays. On the front is a small gabled porch, and most of the windows are sashes.	II
Cage Farmhouse; 54.27134°N 2.43674°W		Early 18th century (probable)	A sandstone farmhouse with quoins and a slate roof. There are two storeys and a symmetrical front of two bays. In the centre is a gabled porch with bargeboards, and rectangular windows. To the left is a single-storey workshop with two fixed windows.	II
Carlow Hill; 54.26733°N 2.35294°W	—	Early 18th century (probable)	Originally a small farmhouse with an attached peat-house and shippon, later a private house, it is in stone with quoins and a stone-slate roof. There are two storeys, three bays, and a full length outshut at the rear. On the front is a square-headed doorway with a gabled wooden porch, most of the windows are sashes, there is one casement window and one fixed window.	II
Craggs Hill; 54.29850°N 2.49916°W	—	Early 18th century (probable)	Originally a farmhouse, later a private house, it is in stone with quoins and a stone-slate roof. The house has an L-shaped plan, consisting of a main range, a rear wing with a stair turret in the angle, and a lean-to porch. There are two storeys, the main range has a plinth, a symmetrical five-bay front, a central gabled porch, a hood mould, and cross-windows.	II
Dee Side Farmhouse; 54.26084°N 2.34898°W		Early 18th century	A stone farmhouse with quoins and a stone-slate roof. There are two storeys, four bays, a full length outshut at the rear, and an outhouse to the left. On the front is a gabled porch with square-headed doorways and a blue slate roof, and the windows are casements resembling sashes.	II
Barn, East Banks Farm; 54.27206°N 2.44740°W	—	Early 18th century (probable)	The barn is in sandstone with a stone-slate roof. It has a rectangular plan, and a shippon has been added to the rear. On the east front is a continuous hood mould, and the barn contains a segmental-headed wagon entrance with voussoirs, two square-headed doorways, square windows, and square ventilation holes.	II
East Clint; 54.26865°N 2.40216°W		Early 18th century	The former farmhouse is in stone with quoins and a stone-slate roof with ridge tiles. There are two storeys, four bays, a rear outshut, and an extension to the right. The porch has a crow-stepped parapet, the doorway has a square head, and the windows are casements resembling sashes.	II
Gale Garth Farmhouse; 54.29945°N 2.51619°W	—	Early 18th century (probable)	The farmhouse is in stone with quoins and a stone-slate roof. It has two storeys and an L-shaped plan, consisting of a main range with a symmetrical front of five bays, a rear wing, and a short wing to the west. On the front is a small gabled porch. Included among the windows are mullioned and transomed windows at the rear.	II
Gate; 54.30231°N 2.51307°W		Early 18th century	A country house that was enlarged in 1825 and again in 1888. It is in sandstone with freestone dressings, a green slate roof, and two storeys. The house has an irregular plan, consisting of a main range, a receding wing at the left and another at the rear, a prominent wing to the right with an extension to the east, and it is mainly in Gothick style. On the front is a two-storey gabled porch with a Tudor arched doorway, gables with elaborately carved bargeboards, sash windows with pointed heads and Gothic tracery, and a polygonal bay window. Elsewhere are mullioned windows, some also with transoms. The chimneys have cylindrical shafts.	II
Greenwell; 54.27151°N 2.44042°W		Early 18th century (probable)	A farmhouse and attached cottage in stone with large quoins and a stone-slate roof. There are two low storeys, the house has four bays, the cottage to the left has one bay, and at the rear is an outshut. The building contains a square-headed doorway with a porch and another doorway, and most of the windows are sashes.	II
Hewthwaite Farmhouse; 54.30405°N 2.50984°W	—	Early 18th century (probable)	The farmhouse is in stone with quoins, a stone-slate roof, two storeys and a cellar. It has a three-bay main range, a gabled wing to the rear, an outshut in the angle, and a lean-to on the east side. In the centre is a low gabled porch containing side benches, the ground floor contains casement windows, in the upper floor are sash windows, and at the rear is a mullioned window.	II
High Foul Syke and barn 54.28310°N 2.47801°W	—	Early 18th century (probable)	The farmhouse and attached barn are in sandstone with quoins and a stone-slate roof. There are two storeys, three bays in the farmhouse, the barn is to the right, and there is a rear outshut. On the front of the farmhouse are a square-headed doorway and casement windows, and the barn contains a square-headed doorway and a small window.	II
High Laning Farmhouse; 54.27818°N 2.45736°W	—	Early 18th century (probable)	The farmhouse is in stone with quoins, a stone-slate roof, and two storeys. It has an L-shaped plan, consisting of a five-bay main range with a rear wing, and a two-bay extension with a longer rear wing. In the main range is a segmental-headed doorway with voussoirs, and in the extension is a doorway with a stone lintel. The windows are sashes.	II
Low Ground; 54.27044°N 2.43469°W		Early 18th century (probable)	The house, which was extended in the 19th century, is in stone with quoins and a stone-slate roof. There are two storeys, the original part has two bays, the extension to the right has one bay, and attached to the rear is a privy. In the original part is a gabled porch, a sash window to the left, and two chamfered mullioned windows above. The extension contains a doorway, a sash window in the ground floor, and a casement window in the upper floor.	II
Middleton Cottage; 54.27754°N 2.45440°W	—	Early 18th century (probable)	A small stone house with quoins and a stone-slate roof. There are two low storeys and two bays. In the centre is a square-headed doorway with two fixed windows to the left. The other windows are sashes.	II
Old Grammar School; 54.27840°N 2.45432°W	—	Early 18th century (probable)	The former grammar school, later a house, is in sandstone, and has a stone-slate roof with coped gables. It has a rectangular plan, two storeys, and four bays. Most of the windows have chamfered jambs and mullions, and at the rear is a mullioned and transomed stair window. In the west gable end is a tall arched doorway, and in the east gable end is a blocked cross-window.	II
Peggles Wright Farmhouse and cart-shed 54.27574°N 2.42232°W	—	Early 18th century	The cart shed was added later to the farmhouse; they are in sandstone with quoins and stone-slate roofs. The house has two storeys, five bays, and a shallow outshut at the rear. On the front is a wide gabled porch, square-headed outer and inner doorways, and windows that were originally mullioned containing casements. The cart shed to the north has two bays and contains a wagon entrance with flat-arched voussoirs.	II
Platt; 54.25450°N 2.42705°W	—	Early 18th century (probable)	A stone house with quoins and a stone-slate roof. There are two storeys, three bays, and lean-to extension on the left. The doorway has a square head, and the windows are sashes.	II
Scar View (old portion); 54.28062°N 2.47252°W}	—	Early 18th century (probable)	Originally a small farmhouse with a barn or stable attached, later combined into a single dwelling. It is in stone with a stone-slate roof, and has two storeys. The former farmhouse has two bays, and the other part has one. In the former house are a gabled porch and casement windows, and in the other part is a square-headed doorway and a casement window.	II
Three Roods, former shop, barn and stable 54.27083°N 2.43541°W		Early 18th century (probable)	The building is in stone with quoins and a stone-slate roof. At the left is a small two-storey two-bay house that has a square-headed doorway with a canopy and sashes. To the right the former shop has a square-headed doorway and a fixed window. Further to the right is a barn with a square-headed wagon entrance, and at the rear is a lean-to stable.	II
White Hart House and Gable Cottage; 54.27783°N 2.45459°W		Early 18th century (probable)	Originally an inn, later divided into two houses, they are in stone with a stone-slate roof. There are three storeys, Gable Cottage, on the left, has one bay, and White Hart House has two. Each house has a square-headed doorway, that on the right with a chamfered surround. Most of the windows are sashes, and White Hart House has three top-hung casements. To the right is a set of mounting steps.	II
Woman's Land; 54.26826°N 2.41823°W	—	Early 18th century (probable)	A farmhouse, later a private house, in stone with quoins and a stone-slate roof. There are two storeys, four irregular bays, and an outbuilding at the front of the east end. On the front is a gabled porch, and almost all the windows are sashes.	II
Combe House; 54.28259°N 2.49077°W		Early to mid 18th century (probable)	The former farmhouse is in stone with sandstone quoins, gritstone dressings, and a stone-slate roof. There are two storeys and a double-depth plan. On the front is a gabled porch, a square-headed doorway, a hood mould, and pigeon holes, and at the rear are mullioned windows.	II
Docklesyke Farmhouse; 54.25557°N 2.42621°W	—	Early to mid 18th century (probable)	A stone farmhouse with a stone-slate roof, two storeys, four bays, a wide outshut at the rear, and a small lean-to at the left. On the front is a wide gabled porch. Two of the windows are sashes with a continuous hood mould above, and the other windows are casements.	II
Gibbs Hall Farmhouse; 54.27243°N 2.40825°W		Early to mid 18th century (probable)	Originally a farmhouse and a cottage, later combined into one dwelling, it is in sandstone with quoins and a stone-slate roof. There are two storeys, a front of four irregular bays, and a rear outshut. In the centre is a gabled porch and a square-headed doorway, and most of the windows are mullioned.	II
Barn north of Hewthwaite Farmhouse; 54.30419°N 2.50985°W	—	Early to mid 18th century (probable)	A stone barn with through stones, quoins and a stone-slate roof. It has an L-shaped plan, consisting of two four-bay ranges at right angles, and two lean-two buildings to the west. It contains wagon doorways, shippon doorways, and a loading doorway.	II
Low Chapel Farmhouse; 54.27702°N 2.42825°W	—	Early to mid 18th century	A farmhouse, later a private house, in sandstone on a plinth partly of boulder stones, with a green slate roof. There are two storeys, four bays, an outshut at the rear built back-to earth, and a shippon added to the west end. On the front is a porch and a square-headed doorway and casement windows, and at the rear is a blocked fire window.	II
Low Haycote; 54.28168°N 2.47504°W	—	Early to mid 18th century (probable)	A farmhouse and former outbuilding now incorporated in the farmhouse, it is in stone with quoins and a stone-slate roof. There are two storeys, the farmhouse has four bays, and the single-bay former outbuilding is to the right. On the front of the farmhouse is a gabled porch and sash windows, and on the front of the former outbuilding are steps leading up to a doorway, and a former mullioned window without its mullion.	II
Barn, Mire House; 54.29746°N 2.49555°W	—	Early to mid 18th century (probable)	The barn is in stone with quoins and a roof mainly of stone-slate with some blue slate. It has a rectangular plan and probably has four bays. The barn contains a segmental-headed wagon doorway with voussoirs, steps leading up to a loft door, a shippon doorway, a square window, and an owl hole.	II
Nettle Pot and barn 54.28139°N 2.47091°W	—	Early to mid 18th century (probable)	The farmhouse and barn are in sandstone with quoins and a stone-slate roof. The farmhouse has two storeys, three bays, a lean-to at the rear, and the barn to the right. On the front of the farmhouse is a gabled porch, and most of the windows are casements imitation sashes. In the barn are a square-headed doorway, and a segmental-headed wagon entrance with voussoirs.	II
Slack Farmhouse; 54.26749°N 2.43604°W		Early to mid 18th century (probable)	Originally a farmhouse with an L-shaped plan, it was extended in the 19th to the west and in the angles, making two dwellings, and has since been converted into a single house. It is in stone with quoins, a roof partly in slate and partly in stone-slate, and has two storeys. The doorways have square heads, there is one fixed window and one mullioned window, the others being sashes.	II
Silverdale Cottage and barn 54.30391°N 2.52223°W	—	Early to mid 18th century (probable)	The house and attached barn are in stone with a slate roof. They have a linear plan, with the back of the house facing the road. The house has two storeys, two bays, and on the front is a small gabled porch. Some of the windows are fixed and others are casements, and at the rear is a stair window. The barn contains a segmental-headed wagon entrance with voussoirs.	II
Barn, Acre Farm; 54.27629°N 2.39848°W	—	18th century (probable)	A sandstone barn with a stone-slate roof, and with a rectangular plan. It contains a small wagon doorway with a wooden lintel and a stone-slate hood mould, and a loft doorway.	II
Barn, Biggerside Farm; 54.28427°N 2.46238°W	—	18th century (probable)	A barn and store, with a later shippon to the west, it is in sandstone with a roof partly of stone-slate and partly of corrugated iron. There are eight bays, and the barn contains a segmental-headed doorway. External steps lead up to a loft door in the store, which has a square headed doorway in the ground floor.	II
Barn, Blake Rigg; 54.25808°N 2.41934°W	—	18th century (probable)	A sandstone barn with quoins and a stone-slate roof. There are three bays, the third bay slightly recessed. In the centre is a doorway with a wooden lintel and a stone-slate hood mould, in the third bay is a doorway with a stone lintel, and in the west gable wall is another doorway with a stone lintel.	II
Boundary stone 54.31108°N 2.53309°W		18th century (probable)	The stone marks the boundary between the parishes of Dent and Sedbergh. It is in sandstone and consists of a flat-faced slab with a segmental head about 1 metre (3 ft 3 in) high with a weathered inscription.	II
Stable, East Banks Farm; 54.27209°N 2.44706°W	—	18th century (probable)	The former stable is in stone with quoins and a stone-slate roof. It has a rectangular plan with two storeys and two bays. The building contains doorways and windows, and there are external steps leading to a first floor loft door.	II
Barn, East Clint; 54.26874°N 2.40234°W	—	18th century (probable)	The barn is in stone with a stone-slate roof, and has four bays and two outshuts. It contains a wagon doorway, and other doorways, including one to a former hayloft. At the rear are two lean-to outhouses.	II
Barn, Ellers; 54.29203°N 2.49397°W	—	18th century (probable)	A bank barn in stone with quoins, and a slate roof with red ridge tiles. It has a rectangular plan with a shippon at the north end. The barn contains doorways and a small window.	II
Field barn 54.27507°N 2.42832°W		18th century (probable)	The barn is in stone with through stones, quoins, and a stone-slate roof. It has a rectangular plan, five bays, and a lean-to shed on the right. The barn contains a wagon doorway with a segmental head and long thin voussoirs, a hood mould, a blocked doorway, and a loading door.	II
Barn west of Gale Garth Farmhouse; 54.29951°N 2.51629°W	—	18th century (probable)	The barn is in stone with some through stones, sandstone quoins, and a stone-slate roof. It has a rectangular plan with five bays and a large outshut on the west side. The barn contains a blocked large wagon entrance with long voussoirs, a smaller doorway, and ventilation slits.	II
Gap Farmhouse; 54.30493°N 2.51314°W		Mid 18th century (probable)	The farmhouse was extended to the east later in the 18th century, and a laundry wing was added to the west in the 19th century. The building is in stone, and has a slate roof with some stone-slate. There are two storeys, and the main part has two bays, a gabled porch containing stone benches, a fixed window to the left, and sash windows to the right and above. The east extension has a casement window in the ground floor, a sash window above, and on the gable apex is a ball finial.	II
Pair of barns, Gap Farm; 54.30478°N 2.51283°W	—	18th century (probable)	The later barn dates from the early 19th century. They are in stone with quoins, some through stones, and stone-slate roofs. The barns form an L-shaped plan, the earlier barn has three bays, and the later barn, at right angles, has four bays. The earlier barn has a segmental-headed doorway, a porch, and an outshut, and the later barn has two storeys, and contains various doorways including a loft door.	II
Barn north-west of Gawthrop Hall; 54.28032°N 2.47252°W	—	18th century (probable)	A small stone barn with quoins and a roof partly of slate and partly of stone-slate. It has an L-shaped plan with an outshut, and contains a square-headed doorway, a wagon entrance, and a loading door converted into a window.	II
Hall Bank Cottage; 54.28103°N 2.44341°W	—	Mid 18th century (probable)	A stone cottage with quoins, a stone-slate roof, and two storeys. There are two bays, and a one-bay outbuilding to the west, now integrated into the cottage. On the front is a porch, and the windows are casements.	II
Barn south of Hewthwaite Farmhouse; 54.30390°N 2.50984°W	—	18th century (probable)	A shippon and porch were added to the barn in the 19th century. The barn is in stone with through stones, quoins and a stone-slate roof. The building has an L-shaped plan with a three-bay main range, and a gabled shippon at the rear. On the front is a gabled porch, and a wagon entrance, and in the shippon are three doorways.	II
Barn north of Howgill House; 54.27187°N 2.43932°W		18th century (probable)	The barn is in sandstone with quoins, a stone-slate roof, and five bays. In the east side is a lean-to porch in front of a wagon entrance with a timber lintel flanked by small windows, and in the south gable wall are three tiers of pigeon holes.	II
Barn west of Lunds Farmhouse; 54.29350°N 2.47134°W	—	18th century (probable)	A barn and shippons in sandstone with quoins and a stone-slate roof. The building has a rectangular plan with shippons to the south, and there are five bays. It contains shippon doors, a small window, and a low segmental-arched wagon entrance with voussoirs.	II
Packsaddle Bridge; 54.25454°N 2.34229°W		18th century	A packhorse bridge carrying a grassy track over the River Dee. It is in sandstone and consists of a low segmental arch with one row of voussoirs.	II
Post Office and barn 54.27739°N 2.45426°W		18th century (probable)	The buildings have been converted into a shop and cottages; they are in stone with quoins and have stone-slate roofs. There are two storeys, a front of three bays, and a rear wing ending in the former barn. There are two square-headed doors on each front, most of the windows are sashes, and there is a shop window.	II
Rash Bridge; 54.30353°N 2.52542°W		18th century (probable)	The bridge carries Mill Lane over the River Dee. It is in stone and consists of two segmental arches with a central pier that has cutwaters on both sides. The bridge has voussoirs and parapets with flat coping.	II
Rash House; 54.30391°N 2.52118°W	—	Mid 18th century (probable)	A farmhouse, then a private house, in stone with quoins and a slate roof. There are two storeys with an attic, two bays, and a set-back service wing to the right. On the front is a square-headed doorway with a small gabled porch. The windows are casements, and above the ground floor windows is a continuous hood mould.	II
Rash Mill; 54.30415°N 2.52680°W		18th century	A former water-powered corn mill built to replace a 16th-century mill on the same site, and later used as a workshop. It is in rendered sandstone with quoins and a stone-slate roof. The mill has two storeys and a basement, and a T-shaped plan, consisting of a main range and outshuts on each side facing the road. On the front is a two-storey porch, and there are various openings including doorways and windows. In the north gable wall is a square-headed opening leading to a cast iron undershot water wheel.	II
Siege Ghyll; 54.27720°N 2.45411°W		Mid 18th century (probable)	A stone house with quoins and stone-slate roofs. It has a double depth plan, two storeys, a main range of two bays, and a higher bay to the right. The main range is symmetrical with a central porch and sash windows, and the right bay has a blank front. At the rear is a stair window.	II
Sun Inn; 54.27792°N 2.45492°W		Mid 18th century (probable)	The public house is in stone with quoins and a stone-slate roof. There are two storeys, three bays with a one-bay extension to the left, and a large rear wing with an outshut in the angle. On the front is a square-headed doorway, most of the windows are sashes, and towards the right is a three-step mounting block.	II
Workshop and store, Spice Gill Farm; 54.27648°N 2.38803°W	—	18th century (probable)	The building is in sandstone on a boulder plinth, with quoins and a stone-slate roof. It has a rectangular plan and two storeys. The building contains a former mullioned window, now with a casement, a segmental-headed wagon doorway with voussoirs, a smaller doorway, square windows, one with a sliding-sash, and external steps leading to a loft doorway.	II
Barn, West Stonehouse Farm; 54.26852°N 2.35238°W	—	18th century (probable)	A sandstone barn with a stone-slate roof and a rectangular plan. On the front are two square-headed doorways, stone steps leading to a first floor loft door, and a loading door.	II
West House Farmhouse at Whernside Manor Farm; 54.26801°N 2.42366°W		18th century (probable)	A stone farmhouse with quoins and a stone-slate roof. There are two storeys, a symmetrical two-bay front, and a lean-to extension to the right. On the front is a gabled porch and square windows, and in the extension is a three-light window.	II
Methodist Manse; 54.27630°N 2.45632°W	—	Mid to late 18th century (probable)	A stone house with a stone-slate roof and two storeys. There are two bays and a single-bay extension to the left. On the front is a gabled porch with side windows and an apex finial. The windows in the ground floor are fixed, and in the upper floor they are sashes.	II
Whernside Manor; 54.26760°N 2.42419°W	—	Mid to late 18th century (probable)	A sandstone house with freestone dressings and a hipped slate roof. It has a T-shaped plan, consisting of a main block and a servants' wing at the rear. The main block has two storeys with a basement, and a symmetrical front of three bays with quoins and a corbel table. In the centre, steps flanked by wrought iron railings lead up to a round-headed doorway with a fanlight. Most of the windows are sashes, there are round-headed basement windows, and in the roof are two flat-headed dormers and skylights.	II
Barn east of Whernside Manor; 54.26765°N 2.42280°W	—	Mid to late 18th century (probable)	The barn is in Georgian style, and built in sandstone with freestone dressings, quoins, coped gables, and a corrugated asbestos sheet roof. It has a rectangular plan with two storeys and a symmetrical front. In the centre are two square windows with wedge lintels, above which are two round-headed loading doors. Flanking these are square windows with keyed oculi above, and round-headed wagon doorways. All the doorways have plain surrounds, imposts, and keystones. In the right gable are three doorways above which are blind arches and keyed oculi, and in the gable is a Diocletian window.	II
Barth Bridge; 54.28588°N 2.47034°W		Late 18th century	The bridge carries a road over the River Dee. It is in sandstone, and consists of a single segmental arch with voussoirs and slightly humped parapets with rounded coping. The bridge continues to the south as a causeway with low segmental-arched flood sluices.	II
Church Bridge; 54.27929°N 2.45073°W		Late 18th century (probable)	The bridge carries a road, Beech Hill, over the River Dee. It is in sandstone, and consists of a single segmental arch with voussoirs, a string course, coped parapets, and end piers on stepped plinths. There are long abutments, that to the west containing a low segmental-arched flood sluice.	II
Dockra Bridge; 54.27994°N 2.37584°W		Late 18th century (probable)	The bridge carries a road over Cowgill Beck. It is in stone, and consists of a single segmental arch with voussoirs, a band, and a parapet with block coping.	II
Barn, High Hall Farm; 54.28303°N 2.45670°W	—	Late 18th century (probable)	A barn and a shippon in stone, the shippon with a stone-slate roof, and the barn with a roof of corrugated iron. They form an L-shaped plan, consisting of a long barn with the shippon at right angles. The barn has a square-headed wagon doorway, square windows and a loading door, and the shippon has a doorway, a window, a loading window, external steps leading to a loft door, pigeon holes in the gable, and an illegible datestone.	II
Barn, Peggles Wright Farm; 54.27579°N 2.42263°W	—	Late 18th century (probable)	The barn, which has a shippon at the rear and a stable and hayloft to the north, is in sandstone with quoins and a stone-slate roof. The barn contains a segmental-headed wagon entrance with a chamfered surround, square-headed doorways, one with a hood mould, and ventilation slits. The stable has two bays, it contains small windows and ventilation slits, and a ramp leads to two doorways in the hay loft.	II
Sedgwick Cottage; 54.27780°N 2.45444°W		Late 18th century (probable)	A sandstone house with quoins and a stone-slate roof. It has a double depth plan, three storeys and two bays. There are doorways on the front and the right side, and the windows vary, most on the front being casements.	II
Stonehouse; 54.26819°N 2.35180°W	—	c. 1800	Originally the home of a marble manufacturer, the house has been extended, and divided into two dwellings. It is in sandstone with gritstone quoins and a stone-slate roof. The house has a double depth plan, and has two ranges, each with three bays, the older range with three storeys and the later range with two. In the older part is a tall round-headed window with voussoirs, and at the rear is a lean-to porch. In the corner of the later part steps wind up to a first floor loading door. The windows vary and contain 20th-century glazing.	II
Washhouse, Burton Hill Farm; 54.30334°N 2.50491°W	—	Late 18th or early 19th century (probable)	The washhouse is a small rectangular building in stone with quoins and a slate roof. It has one low storey, a square-headed doorway, and a square fixed window.	II
Former cobbler's shop and two cottages 54.27771°N 2.45389°W	—	Late 18th or early 19th century (probable)	The buildings are in stone with stone-slate roofs. The cottages have two storeys with basements, the left cottage has one bay, and the right cottage has two. Each cottage has a square-headed doorway. The left cottage has sash windows, the right cottage has a basement window, casement windows imitating sashes in the ground floor, and sash windows above. The former cobbler's shop is set back, with one storey and a basement. Steps lead up to a central doorway, there is a basement door, a sash window and a fixed window.	II
Barn, Geslings; 54.27295°N 2.45112°W	—	Late 18th or early 19th century (probable)	The bank barn is in sandstone with through stones, quoins, and an asbestos sheet roof. It has a rectangular plan with three bays, a shippon at the north end and a lean-to at the south. It contains two square wagon doorways, smaller doorways, and windows, some with hood moulds.	II
Barn, Hall Bank Farm; 54.28113°N 2.44319°W	—	Late 18th or early 19th century (probable)	The barn contains an integral shippon, and there is an added lean-to shippon on the east side. The building is in sandstone, the main part has a stone-slate roof, and the roof of the added shippon is in corrugated iron. There are five bays, and the openings include wagon doorways, shippon doors, and a loading door.	II
High Barth Barn; 54.28747°N 2.46800°W	—	Late 18th or early 19th century (probable)	This consists of a bank barn and a shippon. It is in sandstone with through stones, quoins, and a stone-slate roof. There are two unequal storeys and four bays. The openings include four segmental-headed shippon doorways with voussoirs, a segmental-arched wagon doorway, a loading doorway, and an owl hole.	II
South gateway, St Andrew's Church; 54.27782°N 2.45436°W		Late 18th or early 19th century (probable)	The gateway at the southern entrance to the churchyard consists of a pair of sandstone round-topped piers and a decorative wrought iron gate.	II
Barn, Dairy Cottage; 54.30093°N 2.51129°W	—	Early 19th century (probable)	The barn, with a shippon to the south, is in stone with quoins and a roof partly of slate and partly of stone-slate. In the east front is a large gabled porch. The south gable front has three doors with quoined jambs, in the gable is an owl hole with a ledge, and there is a similar owl hole in the north gable.	II
Stables and loose boxes, Dairy Cottage; 54.30080°N 2.51140°W	—	Early 19th century (probable)	This consists of a range of loose boxes, cart sheds, and a two-storey stable. They are in stone, mainly blue ragstone, the stable has a slate roof with red ridge tiles, and the other parts have a roof of stone-slate. There are three units with open fronts and three doorways, and in the stable are a doorway and a loading door.	II
Dee Side House; 54.26110°N 2.34849°W		Early 19th century	The house was built as a shooting lodge in cottage orné style, then used as a youth hostel, and later a private house. It is in sandstone, partly rendered, with a slate roof. There are two storeys, a two-bay main range, a cross-wing at the right, and a further range at the north end. The doorway has an architrave with pilasters, to its left is a canted bay window, and in the upper floor are casement windows with Tudor arched heads and Gothic glazing. In the left return is a similar window, another bay window, and a gable with bargeboards.	II
Ivy Cottage; 54.27779°N 2.45428°W		Early 19th century (probable)	A stone house with large quoins and a double depth plan. There are three storeys with a basement and an attic, and two bays. Steps lead up to a square-headed doorway flanked by sash windows, with a fixed window to the left. The windows in the middle floor are sashes, and in the top floor they are casementss.	II
Lea Yeat Bridge; 54.27697°N 2.36888°W		Early 19th century	The bridge carries a road over the River Dee and over Monkey Beck to the north. It is in sandstone and consists of a segmental arch over the river, and a smaller similar arch over the beck. The bridge has voussoirs, a band, and parapets with chamfered copings that are splayed at the ends.	II
Limekiln near Stonehouse Bridge; 54.26781°N 2.35311°W	—	Early 19th century (probable)	The limekiln is in sandstone. It has curved sloping sides, and a barrel-shaped draw hole with a lintel. The limekiln has been filled in and the top grassed over.	II
Wesleyan Chapel; 54.27846°N 2.45706°W		1834	The chapel is in stone with quoins, and a blue slate roof with some stone-slate. In the west wall is a round-headed opening with a square-headed doorway above which is a round-headed window. On each side are two round-headed windows, and on the south side is a datestone.	II
Zion Chapel; 54.27643°N 2.45588°W	—	1835	A Congregational church, later a United Reformed Church, in sandstone with quoins, a stone-slate roof, and a rectangular plan. The symmetrical west front is gabled and contains a central round-headed doorway with a plain surround, imposts and a keystone. Above the door is a fanlight with Gothick tracery, and over this is a datestone and blind round-headed windows with voussoirs. In the other walls are round-headed windows with voussoirs and Gothick tracery.	II
Congregational Manse; 54.27637°N 2.45610°W	—	c. 1835 (probable)	A stone house with a slate roof, a square plan, two storeys, and two bays. The doorway has a square head and a plain surround, and above it is a canopy over which is a stone-slate hood mould. The windows are sashes, those in the ground floor with hood moulds.	II
Sundial, Gate; 54.30219°N 2.51319°W	—	Early to mid 19th century (probable)	The sundial stands in the forecourt of the house. It is in sandstone, and has a plinth of two circular steps, a baluster-shaped octagonal pedestal, and is surmounted by a moulded cap.	II
Milestone 2 miles from Sedbergh; 54.30413°N 2.52252°W		Early to mid 19th century	The milestone is in sandstone, and has a square plinth and a semicircular shaft. It is inscribed with "S" and "2", indicating that it is 2 miles from Sedbergh.	II
Milestone 3 miles from Sedbergh; 54.29883°N 2.49985°W	—	Early to mid 19th century	The milestone is in sandstone, and has a square plinth with chamfered corners, and a semicircular shaft with a rounded top. It is inscribed with "S" and "3", indicating that it is 3 miles from Sedbergh.	II
Milestone 4 miles from Sedbergh; 54.29149°N 2.48020°W		Early to mid 19th century	The milestone is in sandstone, and has a square plinth with chamfered corners, and a semicircular shaft with a rounded top. It is inscribed with "S" and "4", indicating that it is 4 miles from Sedbergh.	II
Milestone 5 miles from Sedbergh; 54.28138°N 2.46595°W	—	Early to mid 19th century	The milestone is in sandstone, and has a square plinth with chamfered corners, and a semicircular shaft with a rounded top. It is inscribed with "S" and "5", indicating that it is 5 miles from Sedbergh.	II
Milestone 6 miles from Sedbergh; 54.28003°N 2.44480°W	—	Early to mid 19th century	The milestone is in sandstone, and has a square plinth with chamfered corners, and a semicircular shaft with a rounded top. It is inscribed with "S" and "6", indicating that it is 6 miles from Sedbergh.	II
Milestone 7 miles from Sedbergh; 54.27407°N 2.42306°W	—	Early to mid 19th century	The milestone is in sandstone, and has a square plinth with chamfered corners, and a semicircular shaft with a rounded top. It is inscribed with "S" and "7", indicating that it is 7 miles from Sedbergh.	II
Milestone 8 miles from Sedbergh; 54.27308°N 2.39942°W		Early to mid 19th century	The milestone is in sandstone, and has a square plinth with chamfered corners, and a semicircular shaft with a rounded top. It is inscribed with "S" and "8", indicating that it is 8 miles from Sedbergh.	II
Milestone 9 miles from Sedbergh; 54.27726°N 2.37605°W	—	Early to mid 19th century	The milestone is in sandstone, and has a square plinth with chamfered corners, and a semicircular shaft with a rounded top. It is inscribed with "S" and "9", indicating that it is 9 miles from Sedbergh.	II
Milestone 10 miles from Sedbergh; 54.27151°N 2.35625°W		Early to mid 19th century	The milestone is in sandstone, and has a square plinth with chamfered corners, and a semicircular shaft with a rounded top. It is inscribed with "S" and "10", indicating that it is 10 miles from Sedbergh.	II
Milestone 11 miles from Sedbergh; 54.25867°N 2.34681°W		Early to mid 19th century	The milestone is in sandstone, and has a square plinth with chamfered corners, and a semicircular shaft with a rounded top. It is inscribed with "S" and "11", indicating that it is 11 miles from Sedbergh.	II
St John's Church; 54.27761°N 2.37613°W		1837–38	The church, designed by Edmund Sharpe in Early English style, is in sandstone with a slate roof. It consists of a nave with a south porch, and a short chancel with a north vestry. At the west end is a bellcote with a pyramidal rood and a weathervane. The windows are lancets.	II
Gates and gate piers, St John's Church; 54.27751°N 2.37596°W		1838 (probable)	The gate piers are in sandstone and are monoliths. They have octagonal panelled shafts and pointed caps, and the gates are in wrought iron.	II
Old School; 54.27819°N 2.45570°W		1845	Originally a National School, later used for other purposes, it is in sandstone with freestone dressings and a slate roof with coped gables. It has one storey and a symmetrical front of four bays. In the centre is a gabled porch with a chamfered surround and a hood mould, above which is an inscribed panel. The windows are mullioned with two round-headed lights and hood moulds.	II
Limekiln near Gibbs Hall Farmhouse; 54.27262°N 2.40841°W		1840s	The limekiln is in sandstone, and has a square plan. It is about 4 metres (13 ft) wide and 4.3 metres (14 ft) high, and is built into a slope in the ground. The walls are sloping, there is a hood mould above the draw hole, a buttress on the left side, and a round bowl on the top.	II
Limekiln near High Croft; 54.27254°N 2.41691°W	—	1840s (probable)	The limekiln is in sandstone. It has a square plan, it is about 3.8 metres (12 ft) high, and is built into a slope in the ground. It has sloping walls, and a rectangular draw hole about 1.25 metres (4 ft 1 in) wide. The bowl on the top is partly filled in.	II
Bank House; 54.27778°N 2.45415°W	—	Mid 19th century (probable)	A sandstone house with a slate roof and a double depth plan. There are three storeys with a basement, and two bays. Steps with iron railings on the right lead up to a square-headed doorway. In the ground floor is a fixed window and a sash window. The middle floor contains two sash windows, and in the top floor are casement windows.	II
Beech Hill Cottage; 54.27813°N 2.45337°W		Mid 19th century	Originally two houses, later converted into one, it is in stone with the left gable wall rendered, and the roof in stone-slate. There are two storeys and two bays. In the ground floor is a square-headed doorway flanked by square windows, with a rectangular window to the left. In the upper floor are two square windows containing 20th-century casements resembling sashes.	II
Barn, Birchentree Farm; 54.27096°N 2.39524°W		19th century (probable)	The barn has four bays and is attached to the west end of the farmhouse. A shippon was added in the early 20th century, and this contains a wagon doorway with a wooden lintel and another doorway. At the rear is an opening with voussoirs.	II
Barn, Craggs Hill; 54.29864°N 2.49958°W	—	19th century	The barn is in stone with quoins and a stone-slate roof, and there is an outshut with a slate roof. The barn has a rectangular plan, and contains a large segmental-headed wagon entrance with quoined jambs and voussoirs, hood moulds, smaller doorways, windows, ventilation holes and slits, and an arched owl hole.	II
Gate arch, Gate; 54.30131°N 2.51186°W		19th century (probable)	It is possible that this stone arched entrance to the garden dates from an earlier period and it may have been moved from another site. The gateway is in Renaissance style, and has an opening with a Tudor arched head, banded pilasters with fluted tops and volute supporters, and an entablature with a moulded cornice, a pulvinated frieze, and a pediment with ball finials.	II
Gawthrop Villa; 54.28027°N 2.47287°W	—	Mid 19th century (probable)	A small stone house with a stone-slate roof, two storeys, and a symmetrical front of two bays. On the front is a gabled porch, the ground floor windows contain altered glazing, and in the upper floor the windows are sashes.	II
George and Dragon; 54.27765°N 2.45424°W		Mid 19th century	A public house on a corner site in sandstone with freestone dressings and a hipped slate roof. There are three storeys, three bays on the west front, one bay on the north front, and a canted bay on the corner. Steps lead up to a square-headed doorway with a chamfered surround in the corner bay. Above the doorway is a painted sign, and the windows are sashes.	II
Stable range, Hacker Gill Farm; 54.27039°N 2.39674°W	—	19th century (probable)	The former stable range is in sandstone with quoins and a slate roof. It has a rectangular plan and two low storeys, and contains doorways, square windows, and external steps leading to a loft door.	II
Stable and privy, Hewthwaite Farm; 54.30419°N 2.51015°W	—	19th century (probable)	This consists of a three-bay stable range, with a manure house and privy attached to the east. They are in stone, the stable has a slate roof, and the other parts have a roof of stone-slate. The stable has two storeys, and contains stable doorways and a loading door. The other parts have one low storey and two doorways.	II
Howgill House; 54.27153°N 2.43942°W		Mid 19th century	A former farmhouse with attached outbuilding that incorporates part of an earlier house. It is in sandstone with quoins, the house has a slate roof, and the roof of the outbuilding is in stone-slate. The house has two storeys and three bays, the outbuilding has one storey and one bay, and at the rear is an almost continuous outshut and a lean-to. Most of the windows are sashes, there is one fixed window, a reset mullioned window with a hood mould, and at the rear is a stair window.	II
Peggleside and barn 54.30903°N 2.52968°W		1851	The farmhouse and barn are in sandstone with quoins and a slate roof. The house has two storeys, a double-depth plan, a symmetrical two-bay front, and a single-storey lean-to at the north end. In the centre of the front is a doorway with a plain architrave, a fanlight, and a moulded cornice. Most of the windows are sashes with plain surrounds and hood moulds, there is a stair window at the rear, and a casement window in the lean-to. In the barn is a segmental-headed wagon entrance with a quoined surround, pigeon holes, and a small lean-to.	II
Spice Gill Farmhouse; 54.27656°N 2.38777°W	—	c. 1860–70	The farmhouse incorporates a rear wing dating from the 17th century. It is in stone with quoins and a stone-slate roof. The farmhouse has two storeys, and consists of a main three-bay range and a rear wing, with an outshut in the angle. On the front is a gabled porch and a doorway with a moulded surround, a triangular head, and a central arched panel with initials and a date. The windows on the front are sashes, and in the rear wing are former mullioned windows now without mullions.	II
Sundial Cottage; 54.27343°N 2.42035°W	—	1863 (probable)	A small sandstone house with quoins and a slate roof. It has a double-depth plan, two storeys, a symmetrical front of two bays, and a gabled outhouse on the left. In the centre is a gabled porch, above which is a large square sundial. The windows are casements imitating sashes.	II
Hennery-Piggery and Privy; 54.29358°N 2.47094°W		Mid to late 19th century	The building housed pigs in the ground floor and hens above. It is in sandstone with quoins, and has a stone-slate roof with clay ridge tiles. There are two storeys, and an L-shaped plan with a privy attached to the east end. In the ground floor is a low entry, and a stone stepped ladder leads up to a rectangular bird hole.	II
Limekiln west of Yellow Gill; 54.27269°N 2.44376°W		Mid to late 19th century (probable)	The limekiln is in sandstone with quoins, and it has a square plan. Facing the road is a slightly tapering draw hole with a lintel. Above the draw hole, the front face is stepped back, and the top courses are missing.	II
Limekiln in Keldishaw field 54.27229°N 2.48780°W		Mid to late 19th century (probable)	The limekiln is in sandstone and limestone, with some slate. It has a rectangular plan, sloping sides, and an earth ramp at the rear. The draw hole faces east, and has a flat-arched opening with voussoirs. The round bowl on the top is partly filled in.	II
Former workers' barracks, Dent railway station 54.28139°N 2.36288°W		Late 1860s	The building is in stone with sandstone quoins and dressings and a slate roof. It has a single storey, a rectangular plan, three doors and four windows. The doorways have square heads with chamfered lintels, and the rectangular windows have quoined jambs, chamfered sills and lintels, and fixed glazing.	II
Artengill Viaduct; 54.26795°N 2.34501°W		1869–75	The viaduct was built by the Midland Railway to carry the Settle–Carlisle line over the valley of Artengill Beck. It is in sandstone, and consists of eleven round-headed arches with tapering rectangular piers. The viaduct has imposts, rusticated voussoirs, a moulded string course, and parapets with rounded coping.	II
Dent Head Viaduct; 54.25436°N 2.34268°W		1869–75	The viaduct was built by the Midland Railway to carry the Settle–Carlisle line over the valley of the River Dee. It is in sandstone, slightly curved, and consists of ten round-headed arches with brick soffits, carried on tapering rectangular piers. The viaduct has imposts, rusticated voussoirs, a moulded string course, and parapets with rounded coping.	II
Dairy Cottage and stable 54.30098°N 2.51140°W	—	Late 19th century	The cottage and stable to the south are in sandstone with quoins and slate roofs with red ridge tiles. The cottage, which is in cottage orné style, has 1 1/2 storeys and two bays. On the front is a segmental-headed doorway with voussoirs, a mullioned window to the right, sash windows above with Gothick glazing, and large half-dormers with bargeboards and finials. In the gable wall facing the road is a mullioned window, a round-headed window above it, wavy bargeboards and a weathercock. The stable contains a semicircular window, a stable door, a loading doorway, and an arched opening in the gable.	II
Limekiln near High Chapel; 54.27517°N 2.42518°W		Late 19th century (probable)	The limekiln is in sandstone with quoins. It has a square plan, is about 2.6 metres (8 ft 6 in) high, and has a slightly tapered draw hole about 1.75 metres (5 ft 9 in) high.	II
Low Nun House; 54.26459°N 2.43225°W	—	Late 19th century	A farmhouse incorporating earlier fabric, in stone with a slate roof. It has two storeys and a cruciform plan, consisting of a three-bay main range, a gabled porch on the front, a porch-wing at the rear, and a lean-to outbuilding on the right. The porches have side doors and round-headed windows. To the left of the front porch is a stair window, and all the windows have small panes and Gothick glazing.	II
Sedgwick Fountain; 54.27778°N 2.45440°W		Late 19th century	A drinking fountain to the memory of the geologist Adam Sedgwick. It is in roughly hewn pink granite, and has a roughly rectangular base into which a trough is cut. Standing on this is a large piece of rock containing an arched drinking fountain, and to the right are carved the name and dates of Sedgwick.	II
Monument to Lucy Elam; 54.28741°N 2.47638°W	—	1876	The monument is to a local benefactress, and is in granite. It consists of a rectangular block with a plinth consisting of three steps, and has a cornice. On the monument is an inscribed plaque.	II
Old Station, Dent railway station 54.28245°N 2.36373°W		c. 1876	The station was built by the Midland Railway for its Settle–Carlisle line, and this building includes a booking hall and waiting rooms. It is in sandstone with freestone dressings, and has a Welsh slate roof with sandstone copings and blue ridge tiles, and is in free Tudor style. The building is in a single storey and has a central range, flanking gabled wings, and a further range to the south. In the centre of the main range is a doorway flanked by windows with geometrical tracery. The flanking wings have mullioned and transomed windows, an oculus above, and gables with decorative bargeboards.	II
Waiting room, Dent railway station 54.28255°N 2.36346°W		c. 1876	The passengers' waiting room was built by the Midland Railway for its Settle–Carlisle line. It is in sandstone with freestone dressings, and has a Welsh slate roof with sandstone copings and blue ridge tiles. The building has a rectangular plan and a symmetrical front, with a central doorway and four mullioned windows. All the openings have moulded surrounds and rounded corners.	II
War memorial 54.27807°N 2.45426°W		1921	The war memorial stands immediately to the south of St Andrew's Church. It is in limestone, and consists of a wheel head cross on a tapering shaft on a tapering three-tier plinth on a square base. On the plinth are inscriptions and the names of those lost in the two World Wars. The memorial stands in a gravel bed enclosed by low kerbstones.	II
Telephone kiosk near Gibbs Hall Farmhouse; 54.27230°N 2.40828°W		1935	A K6 type telephone kiosk, designed by Giles Gilbert Scott. Constructed in cast iron with a square plan and a dome, it has three unperforated crowns in the top panels.	II
Telephone kiosk near Rose Cottage; 54.27733°N 2.36882°W		1935	A K6 type telephone kiosk, designed by Giles Gilbert Scott. Constructed in cast iron with a square plan and a dome, it has three unperforated crowns in the top panels.	II
Telephone kiosk outside Dent Reading Room; 54.27727°N 2.45394°W		1935	A K6 type telephone kiosk, designed by Giles Gilbert Scott. Constructed in cast iron with a square plan and a dome, it has three unperforated crowns in the top panels.	II
