= Dent Marble =

Polished limestone from Northern England

Dent Marble Black Marble
- Sedimentary rock
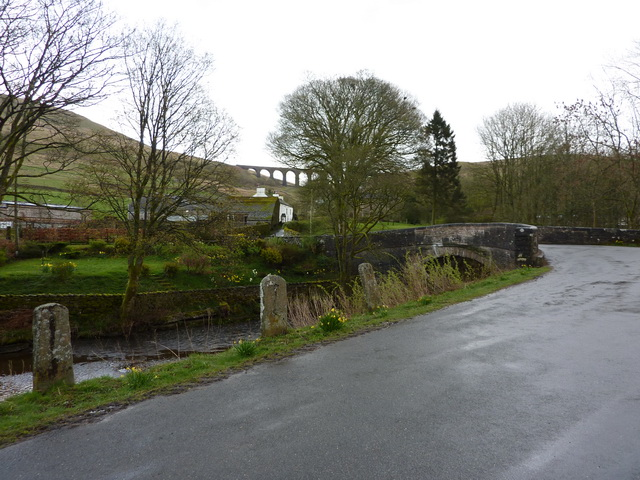
- The hamlet of Stone House, where the two mills were located

Composition
- Crinoidal limestone

Dent Marble is a highly polished form of limestone which occurs in the Dentdale district of Cumbria in England. The stone is noted for the presence of fossils which gives it its distinctive look. The stone is actually a crinoidal limestone and is not a true marble, but is known as a marble because it polished quite well. Dent Marble has been used for staircases, floors and hearths in railway stations and large buildings in England, Australia and Russia. The trade died out when import tariffs on Italian marble were relaxed, and Dent Marble became less popular.

== History ==
The limestone was discovered to be of use as a decorative stone about 1760, and production of the polished stone as marble flourished. By 1810, water-powered mills were being used to drive the marble-cutting saws at High Mill, and the polishing works at Low Mill. The stone used for processing was quarried at Artengill, Dent Head, Great Coum and Rise Hill, though it has been identified as occurring at Garsdale, Gawthrop and Sedbergh. The stone that occurred within Artengill was of a varying thickness. However, it could be quarried easily from the surface with levers and wedges, with no records of blasting or drilling being evident. The quarrying without explosives has also been attributed to the need not to jolt or damage the stone, as this would make it unsuitable for polishing. Some seams were exposed in gills (streams) that had been worn down by the action of water.

Dent Marble was originally cut at High Mill, and polished at Low Mill works in the dale prior to being used. Both mills were located on Artengill Beck, with High Mill being nearer to Arten Gill Viaduct, (Note: The beck is known as Artengill, but the railway records the viaduct above it as Arten Gill.) and used water power to enable cutting of the stone, with the mill-wheel at High Mill being 60 feet (18 m) in diameter. Low mill was previously used for carding cotton before being repurposed for the Dent Marble industry, and collectively, the two mills were known as the Stone House Marble Works; Stone House being the hamlet the two mills were located in. The hamlet saw an increase in population, with a special mention in census returns detailing the numbers involved.

In 1835, William George Armstrong was on honeymoon in Dentdale and was interested in the use of water to power the water wheels at the marble works in the dale. Moreover, Armstrong noted the inefficiency of the use of the water, calculating that only 20% of the available water from Artengill Beck was being converted into power. This led to him changing his career and creating hydro-electric power at his estate, Cragside.

Exporting the marble from Dentdale was difficult, and had to be done by pack-horse trains to the Leeds and Liverpool Canal at Gargrave. The opening of the railway from Settle to Carlisle in 1876, allowed for the marble to be transhipped via Dent railway station.

Later, use of imported Italian marble supplanted the use of Dent Marble, as the import tariffs on that stone were relaxed. During its latter years, the works at High Mill in Dentdale actually worked with imported Italian marble, before finally closing in 1906–1907, and the works at Low Mill closed a year later. The remains of the works in the dale have been recognised as important, as only one other marble works in England (Derbyshire), is also extant, all others having been demolished completely. High Mill has been converted into a dwelling, and is now a grade II listed structure.

== Geology ==
The limestone used is particular to the area, and is called a crinoidal limestone, a dark stone with a high carbon content and laced with the white fossils of sea-lilies. Various types of limestone were worked from the local beds; a white stone, a black stone and a grey stone, all of which were usd in the industry. Often, these would be put together for flooring to produce a chequered pattern, with large amounts being exported to Australia. The back and grey flooring was used in the Church of St Andrew in Dent.

== Notable use ==
Several railway stations on the Settle–Carlisle line (including Dent) had a Dent Marble fireplace installed in them. Other notable uses include;

- Arten Gill Viaduct
- A staircase in Cartwright Hall, Bradford
- St Andrew's Church, Dent - the floor of the chancel is made from Dent Marble in a black and white chequer pattern
- Hearth of the Winter Palace, St Petersburg
- Ingleborough Hall, Clapham, North Yorkshire - the staircase, columns, and fireplace are made from Dent Marble
- St Peter's Church, Field Broughton - the font is carved from Dent Marble
- The staircase of Owen's College in Manchester
- The staircases of the Inns of Court in London
- The chancel floor of Church of All Souls, Bolton
