= St John the Evangelist's Church, Cowgill =

Coordinates: 54.27757°N 2.37621°W

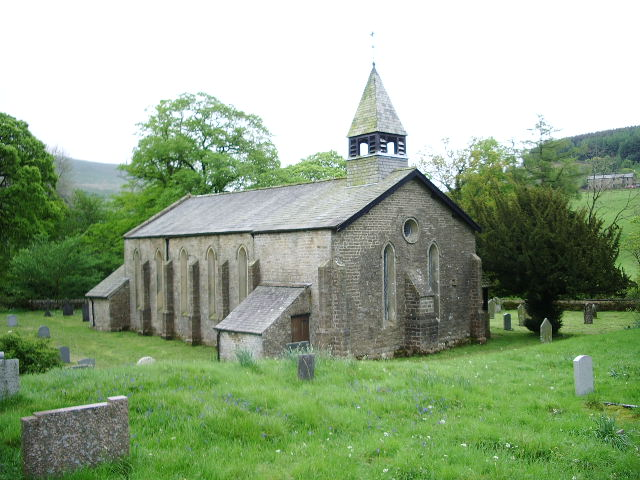
- St John the Evangelist's Church seen from the southeast

- Location in Cumbria
- OS grid reference: SD756869
- Location: Cowgill, Cumbria
- Country: England
- Denomination: Church of England

History
- Status: Parish church
- Founded: 30 June 1837
- Dedication: St John the Evangelist
- Consecrated: 31 October 1838

Architecture
- Functional status: active
- Heritage designation: Grade II
- Designated: 14 June 1984
- Architect: Edmund Sharpe
- Architectural type: Church
- Style: Gothic Revival
- Completed: 1838

Specifications
- Materials: sandstone, slate roofs

Administration
- Province: York
- Diocese: Diocese of Carlisle
- Archdeaconry: Westmorland and Furness
- Deanery: Kendal
- Parish: Dent with Cowgill and Western Dales Mission Community

Clergy
- Vicar: Rev Andrew Burgess (2022 -) Rev Andy McMullon (2020) Revd Peter Boyles (1999 - 2017)

St John the Evangelist's Church is the Church of England parish church of the village of Cowgill, Cumbria, England. It is in the deanery of Kendal, the Archdeaconry of Westmorland and Furness, and the Diocese of Carlisle. Its benefice is united with that of St Andrew, Dent.

The church is a Grade II listed building.

== History ==
The church was built in 1837–38, and has previously been known as Kirkthwaite Chapel, and Cowgill Chapel. It was designed by the Lancaster architect Edmund Sharpe. Its design is similar to that of Holy Trinity Church, Howgill, which dates from the same period. The foundation stone was laid on 30 June 1837 by Adam Sedgwick, Professor of Geology at Cambridge University. The church was consecrated on 31 October 1838 by the Bishop of Ripon. It provided seating for 250 people. The Church of England Commissioners transferred the parish to the Diocese of Carlisle in 2012.

== Architecture ==
St John's is built of coursed sandstone rubble with slate roofs. Its architectural style is Early English. It has a six-bay nave, a single-bay chancel with a vestry to the north, a south porch, and a bellcote at the west end. Each bay has a lancet window, and there are buttresses between the bays. On the south side of the church is a wooden gabled porch. The bellcote has wooden louvres, and a steep pyramidal roof surmounted by a weathervane. At the gabled west end of the church is a central buttress flanked by lancets, above which is an oculus. The east window is a stepped triple-lancet. Inside the church are wall memorials to members of the Elam family and others. The single-manual organ was built by T Hopkins and Son.

== External features ==
The wrought iron gates and the sandstone gate piers to the churchyard, dating probably from 1838, are also Grade II listed.

== See also ==
- Listed buildings in Dent, Cumbria
- List of architectural works by Edmund Sharpe
