= St Andrew's Church, Dent =

Coordinates: 54.2781°N 2.4542°W

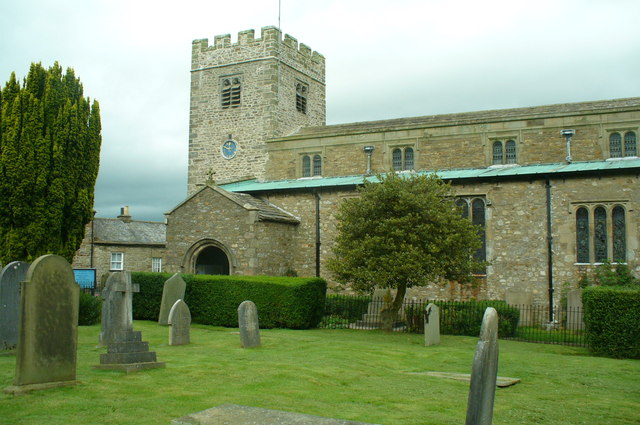
- St Andrew's Church, Dent, from the south

- Location in Cumbria
- OS grid reference: SD 705,870
- Location: Dent
- Country: England
- Denomination: Anglican
- Website: St Andrew, Dent

History
- Status: Parish church
- Dedication: Saint Andrew

Architecture
- Functional status: Active
- Heritage designation: Grade I
- Designated: 16 March 1954
- Architect(s): Paley, Austin and Paley (1889–90 restoration)
- Architectural type: Church
- Style: Norman, Gothic

Specifications
- Materials: Stone, stone slate and copper roofs

Administration
- Province: York
- Diocese: Carlisle
- Archdeaconry: Westmorland and Furness
- Deanery: Kendal
- Parish: Dent with Cowgill

Clergy
- Vicar: Revd Andy Burgess (2022 -) Revd Andy McMullon (2020) Revd Peter John Boyles (1999 - 2017)

St Andrew's Church is in the village of Dent, Cumbria, England. It is an active Anglican parish church in the Western Dales Mission Community in the deanery of Kendal and archdeaconry of Westmorland and Furness and the diocese of Carlisle. Its benefice is united with that of St John the Evangelist, Cowgill. The church is recorded in the National Heritage List for England as a designated Grade I listed building.

== History ==
St Andrew's originated in the 12th century, was rebuilt in 1417, restored in 1590, and again in 1787. A further restoration was carried out in 1889–90 by the Lancaster architects Paley, Austin and Paley at a cost of £2,700 (equivalent to £300,000 in 2025).

== Architecture ==
=== Exterior ===
The church is constructed in rubble stone. The nave has a stone slate roof, and the roofs of the aisles are in copper. Its architectural style is mainly Perpendicular. The plan consists of a nave and chancel in one range with a clerestory, north and south aisles running the whole length of the church, a south porch, and a west tower. The tower has a square-headed south doorway, a small west window, a clock face on the south side, and two-light louvred bell openings. At the top of the tower is an embattled parapet. To the west of the north aisle is a lean-to structure containing a round-headed west doorway. The south porch is gabled with a round-headed doorway, leading to a pointed-arched doorway into the church. Along the sides of the clerestory on each side are four two-light windows in the nave, and two three-light windows in the chancel. The south aisle has a two-light window adjacent to the porch, and four three-light windows to the east of it. Under the fourth window is a round-headed priest's door. On the north side of the church is a blocked round-headed doorway towards the west, then windows similar to those of the south aisle. The east window has five lights, and is flanked by two three-light windows. Norman features have been retained in the blocked north doorway, and in parts of the nave and tower.

=== Interior ===
The six-bay arcades are carried on cylindrical and octagonal piers. The chancel is paved with polished Dent Marble in a black-and-white chequer pattern. The octagonal oak pulpit is dated 1614, and has a sounding board. There are 17th-century box pews and 18th-century benches in the aisles. The octagonal font is made from Barrow limestone. The stained glass in the east window depicts the Te Deum. The memorials include a marble wall tablet to the geologist Adam Sedgwick who died in 1873. Above the entrance are the Royal arms of George III dated 1792. The two-manual organ was built in about 1892 by H. S. Vincent and Company. It was restored in 2009 by Harrison and Harrison. There is a ring of six bells, all cast in 1787 by William Mears at the Whitechapel Bell Foundry. The ring of bells were overhauled in 2011 by the same bell foundry. They were chrismated (named) by the former Archbishop of York, Dr David Hope on 1 March 2011 enabling them to be pealed for the first time since the Armistice in 1918 on Sunday 6 March 2011.

== External features ==
The gateway on the south side of the churchyard is listed at Grade II. It consists of a pair of sandstone piers and a wrought iron gate, and dates from the late 18th or early 19th century. Also listed at Grade II is the former grammar school standing in the churchyard, now converted into flats. It is a sandstone building with stone slate roofs, and dates probably from the early 18th century.

== See also ==
- Grade I listed churches in Cumbria
- Grade I listed buildings in Cumbria
- Listed buildings in Dent, Cumbria
- List of works by Paley, Austin and Paley
