= Deepdale, Cumbria =

Valley in England

Coordinates: 54.264°N 2.432°W

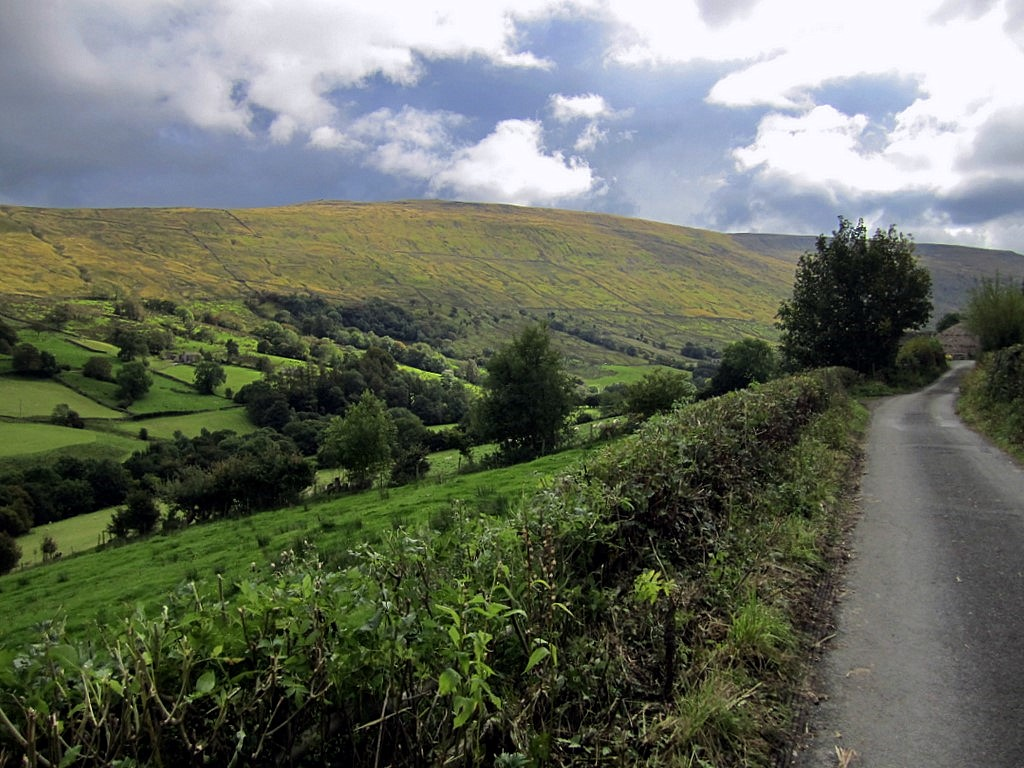
Deepdale

Deepdale is a side valley of Dentdale in the Yorkshire Dales National Park in Cumbria, England. It lies north west of the summit of Whernside.

The dale is accessible by a narrow road which runs from Dent south to Kingsdale and Ingleton.
