= Adam Sedgwick =

British geologist (1785–1873)

The Reverend Adam Sedgwick FRS
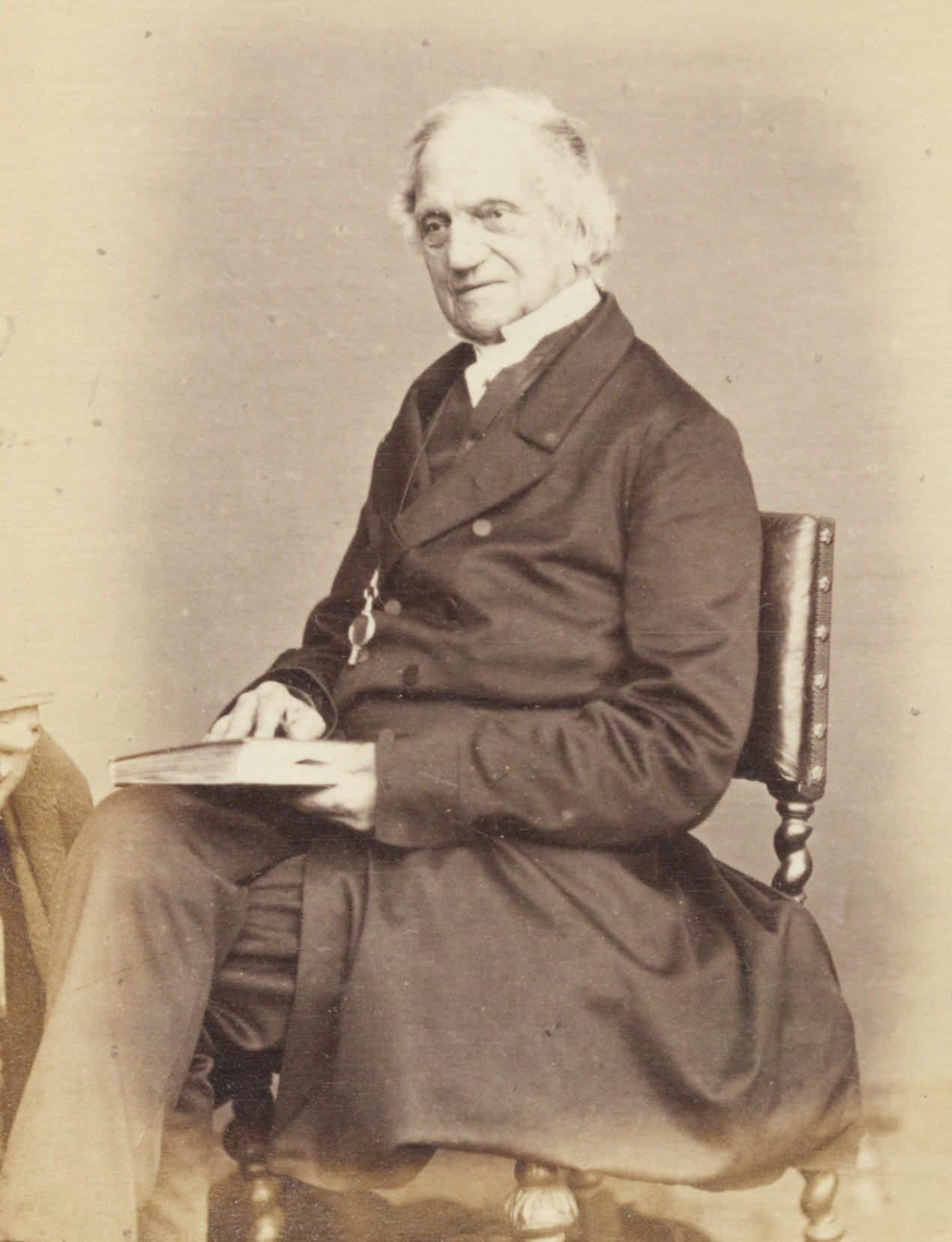
- Portrait of Adam Sedgwick, c. 1863, by Ernest Edwards
- Born: 22 March 1785; Dent, Yorkshire, England
- Died: 27 January 1873 (aged 87); Cambridge, England
- Education: Trinity College, Cambridge
- Known for: Classification of Cambrian rocks Opposition to evolution and natural selection
- Awards: Wollaston Medal (1833); Copley Medal (1863)
- Scientific career
- Fields: Geology
- Workplaces: Trinity College, Cambridge
- Academic advisors: John Dawson; Thomas Jones
- Notable students: Charles Darwin; William Hopkins; T. McK. Hughes; Joseph Jukes; George Peacock

Signature
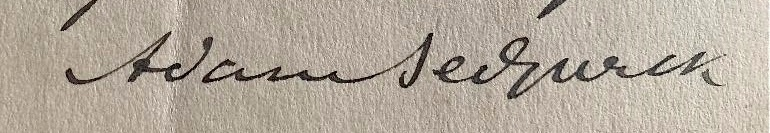

Adam Sedgwick (/ˈsɛdʒwɪk/; 22 March 1785 – 27 January 1873) was a British geologist and Anglican priest, one of the founders of modern geology. He proposed the Cambrian and Devonian period of the geological timescale. Based on work which he did on Welsh rock strata, he proposed the Cambrian period in 1835, in a joint publication in which Roderick Murchison also proposed the Silurian period. Later in 1840, to resolve what later became known as the Great Devonian Controversy about rocks near the boundary between the Silurian and Carboniferous periods, he and Murchison proposed the Devonian period.

Though he had guided the young Charles Darwin in his early study of geology and continued to be on friendly terms, Sedgwick was an opponent of Darwin's theory of evolution by means of natural selection.

He strongly opposed the admission of women to the University of Cambridge, in one conversation describing aspiring female students as "nasty forward minxes."

== Life and career ==
Sedgwick was born in Dent, Yorkshire, the third child of an Anglican vicar. He was educated at Sedbergh School and Trinity College, Cambridge.

He studied mathematics and theology, and obtained his BA (5th Wrangler) from the University of Cambridge in 1808 and his MA in 1811. On 20 July 1817 he was ordained a deacon, then a year later he was ordained as a priest. His academic mentors at Cambridge were Thomas Jones and John Dawson. He became a Fellow of Trinity College, Cambridge and Woodwardian Professor of Geology at Cambridge from 1818, holding the chair until his death in 1873. His biography in the Cambridge Alumni database says that upon his acceptance of the position, Sedgwick had no working knowledge of geology. An 1851 portrait of Sedgwick by William Boxall hangs in Trinity's collection.

Sedgwick studied the geology of the British Isles and Europe. He founded the system for the classification of Cambrian rocks and with Roderick Murchison worked out the order of the Carboniferous and underlying Devonian strata. These studies were mostly carried out in the 1830s. The investigations into the Devonian meant that Sedgwick was involved with Murchison in a vigorous debate with Henry De la Beche, in what became known as the great Devonian controversy.

He also employed John William Salter for a short time in arranging the fossils in the Woodwardian Museum at Cambridge, and whom accompanied the professor on several geological expeditions (1842–1845) into Wales. John Ruthven, with whom Sedgwick has a room at Kendal museum co-named after him, also frequently accompanied Sedgwick in Wales and beyond.

Sedgwick investigated the phenomena of metamorphism and concretion, and was the first to distinguish clearly between stratification, jointing, and slaty cleavage. He was elected to Fellow of the Royal Society on 1 February 1821. In 1844, he was elected a Foreign Honorary Member of the American Academy of Arts and Sciences. He was president of the Geological Society of London.

== Geological views and evolution ==
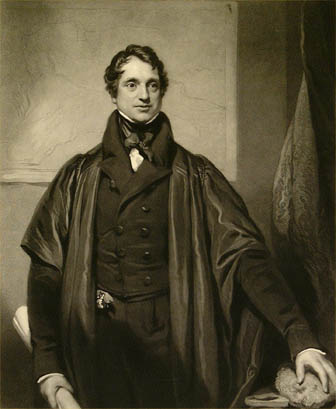
Adam Sedgwick

The Church of England, by no means a fundamentalist or evangelical church, encloses a wide range of beliefs. During Sedgwick's life there developed something of a chasm between the conservative high church believers and the liberal wing. After simmering for some years, the publication of Essays and Reviews by liberal churchmen in 1860 pinpointed the differences. In all this, Sedgwick, whose science and faith were intertwined in a natural theology, was definitely on the conservative side, and extremely outspoken about it. He told the February 1830 meeting of the Geological Society of London:

No opinion can be heretical, but that which is not true.... Conflicting falsehoods we can comprehend; but truths can never war against each other. I affirm, therefore, that we have nothing to fear from the results of our enquiries, provided they be followed in the laborious but secure road of honest induction. In this way we may rest assured that we shall never arrive at conclusions opposed to any truth, either physical or moral, from whatever source that truth may be derived ...

As a geologist in the mid-1820s he supported William Buckland's interpretation of certain superficial deposits, particularly loose rocks and gravel, as "diluvium" relating to worldwide floods, and in 1825 he published two papers identifying these as due to a "great irregular inundation" from the "waters of a general deluge", Noah's flood. Sedgwick's subsequent investigations and discussions with continental geologists persuaded him that this was problematic. In early 1827, after spending several weeks in Paris, he visited geological features in the Scottish Highlands with Roderick Murchison. He later wrote "If I have been converted in part from the diluvian theory...it was...by my own gradual improved experience, and by communicating with those about me. Perhaps I may date my change of mind (at least in part) from our journey in the Highlands, where there are so many indications of local diluvial operations.... Humboldt ridiculed [the doctrine] beyond measure when I met him in Paris. Prévost lectured against it." In response to Charles Lyell's 1830 publication, Principles of Geology, which is known for promoting uniformitarian geology Sedgwick talked of floods at various dates, then on 18 February 1831 when retiring from the Presidency of the Geological Society he recanted his former belief in Buckland's theory.

He strongly believed that species of organisms originated in a succession of Divine creative acts throughout the long expanse of history. Any form of development that denied a direct creative action smacked as materialistic and amoral. For Sedgwick, moral truths (the obtainment of which separates man from beast) were to be distinguished from physical truths, and to combine these or blur them together could only lead to disastrous consequences. In fact, one's own hope for immortality may ultimately rest on it.

He stated in 1830 that scriptural geologists proposed "a deformed progeny of heretical and fantastical conclusions, by which sober philosophy has been put to open shame, and sometimes even the charities of life have been exposed to violation." In 1834 he continued, "They have committed the folly and SIN of dogmatizing," having "sinned against plain sense," and "of writing mischievous nonsense," "Their eyes cannot bear to look upon" truth and suppose an "ignorant and dishonest" theory. They show "bigotry and ignorance," of nature's laws and natural phenomena. Henry Cole then responded in 1834 in a 136-page "letter," Popular Geology Subversive of Divine Revelation. He referred to Sedgwick's ideas as "unscriptural and anti-Christian," "scripture-defying", "revelation-subverting," and "baseless speculations and self-contradictions," which were "impious and infidel".

While he became increasingly Evangelical with age, he strongly supported advances in geology against conservative churchmen. At the September 1844 British Association for the Advancement of Science meeting at York he achieved national celebrity for his reply defending modern geology against an attack by the Dean of York, the Reverend William Cockburn, who described it as unscriptural. The entire chapter house of the cathedral refused to sit down with Sedgwick, and he was opposed by conservative papers including The Times, but his courage was hailed by the full spectrum of the liberal press, and the confrontation was a key moment in the battle over relations between Scripture and science.

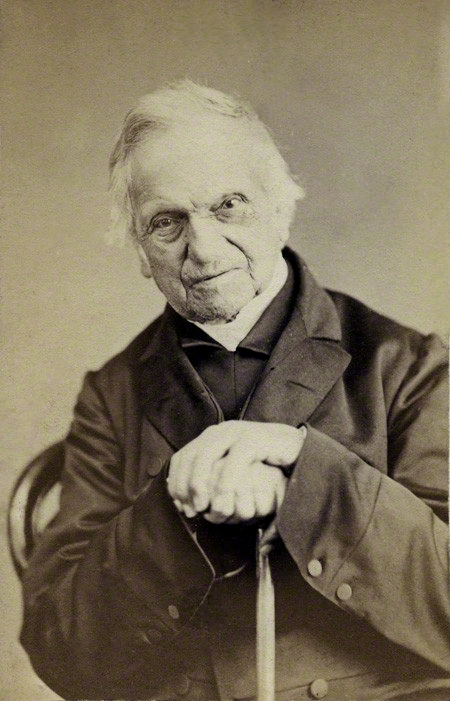
Sedgwick in 1867

When Robert Chambers anonymously published his own theory of universal evolutionism as his "development hypothesis" in the book Vestiges of the Natural History of Creation published in October 1844 to immediate popular success, Sedgwick's many friends urged him to respond. Like other eminent scientists he initially ignored the book, but the subject kept recurring and he then read it carefully and made a withering attack on the book in the July 1845 edition of the Edinburgh Review. Vestiges "comes before [its readers] with a bright, polished, and many-coloured surface, and the serpent coils a false philosophy, and asks them to stretch out their hands and pluck the forbidden fruit", he wrote in his review. Accepting the arguments in Vestiges was akin to falling from grace and away from God's favour.

He lashed out at the book in a letter to Charles Lyell, bemoaning the consequences of its conclusions. "...If the book be true, the labours of sober induction are in vain; religion is a lie; human law is a mass of folly, and a base injustice; morality is moonshine; our labours for the black people of Africa were works of madmen; and man and woman are only better beasts!" Later, Sedgwick added a long preface to the 5th edition of his Discourse on the Studies of the University of Cambridge (1850), including a lengthy attack on Vestiges and theories of development in general.

Charles Darwin was one of his geology students in 1831, and accompanied him on a field trip to Wales that summer. The two kept up a correspondence while Darwin was on the Beagle expedition, and afterwards. However, Sedgwick never accepted the case for evolution made in On the Origin of Species in 1859 any more than he did that in Vestiges in 1844. In response to receiving and reading Darwin's book, he wrote to Darwin saying:

If I did not think you a good tempered & truth loving man I should not tell you that... I have read your book with more pain than pleasure. Parts of it I admired greatly; parts I laughed at till my sides were almost sore; other parts I read with absolute sorrow; because I think them utterly false & grievously mischievous – You have deserted—after a start in that tram-road of all solid physical truth—the true method of induction—& started up a machinery as wild I think as Bishop Wilkins's locomotive that was to sail with us to the Moon. Many of your wide conclusions are based upon assumptions which can neither be proved nor disproved. Why then express them in the language & arrangements of philosophical induction?

Sedgwick regarded natural selection as

but a secondary consequence of supposed, or known, primary facts. Development is a better word because more close to the cause of the fact. For you do not deny causation. I call (in the abstract) causation the will of God: & I can prove that He acts for the good of His creatures. He also acts by laws which we can study & comprehend—Acting by law, & under what is called final cause, comprehends, I think, your whole principle ...

He emphasised his distinction between the moral and physical aspects of life, "There is a moral or metaphysical part of nature as well as a physical. A man who denies this is deep in the mire of folly". If humanity broke this distinction it "would suffer a damage that might brutalize it—& sink the human race into a lower grade of degradation than any into which it has fallen since its written records tell us of its history".

In a letter to another correspondent, Sedgwick was even harsher on Darwin's book, calling it "utterly false" and writing that "It repudiates all reasoning from final causes; and seems to shut the door on any view (however feeble) of the God of Nature as manifested in His works. From first to last it is a dish of rank materialism cleverly cooked and served up".

Despite this difference of opinion, the two men remained friendly until Sedgwick's death. In contrast to Sedgwick, liberal church members (who included biologists such as George Rolleston, William Henry Flower and William Kitchen Parker) were usually comfortable with evolution.

== Links and opposition to slavery ==
A liberal Whig in politics, Sedgwick had long been a passionate supporter of abolition. In a letter to Bishop Wilberforce, dated July 16, 1848, Sedgwick wrote of signing a petition against the slave trade while he was a child—the first "political act of [his] life"—after his father had shown him "ugly pictures of the horrors of slavery". However, although Sedgwick did nothing to further slavery, he was arguably a beneficiary of it through his links with the Sill family, who were his neighbours in Yorkshire. The Sills owned slaves in Jamaica and brought at least one back home to Dentdale.

Ann Sill, described on her memorial in Dent church as "last survivor of the aforesaid family", owned slaves in 1834 when the abolition of slavery in the British Empire was put into effect. She claimed compensation, but died in 1835 before it was awarded. The money went to the co-trustees of her will, one of whom was Sedgwick. Details are given in the database of the Centre for the Study of the Legacies of British Slavery. He was awarded half of £3,783 in compensation for 174 slaves. This was to be passed on to beneficiaries of the will (of which he was one). He was one of 46,000 people paid compensation by the British government following the abolition of slavery.

== Legacy ==
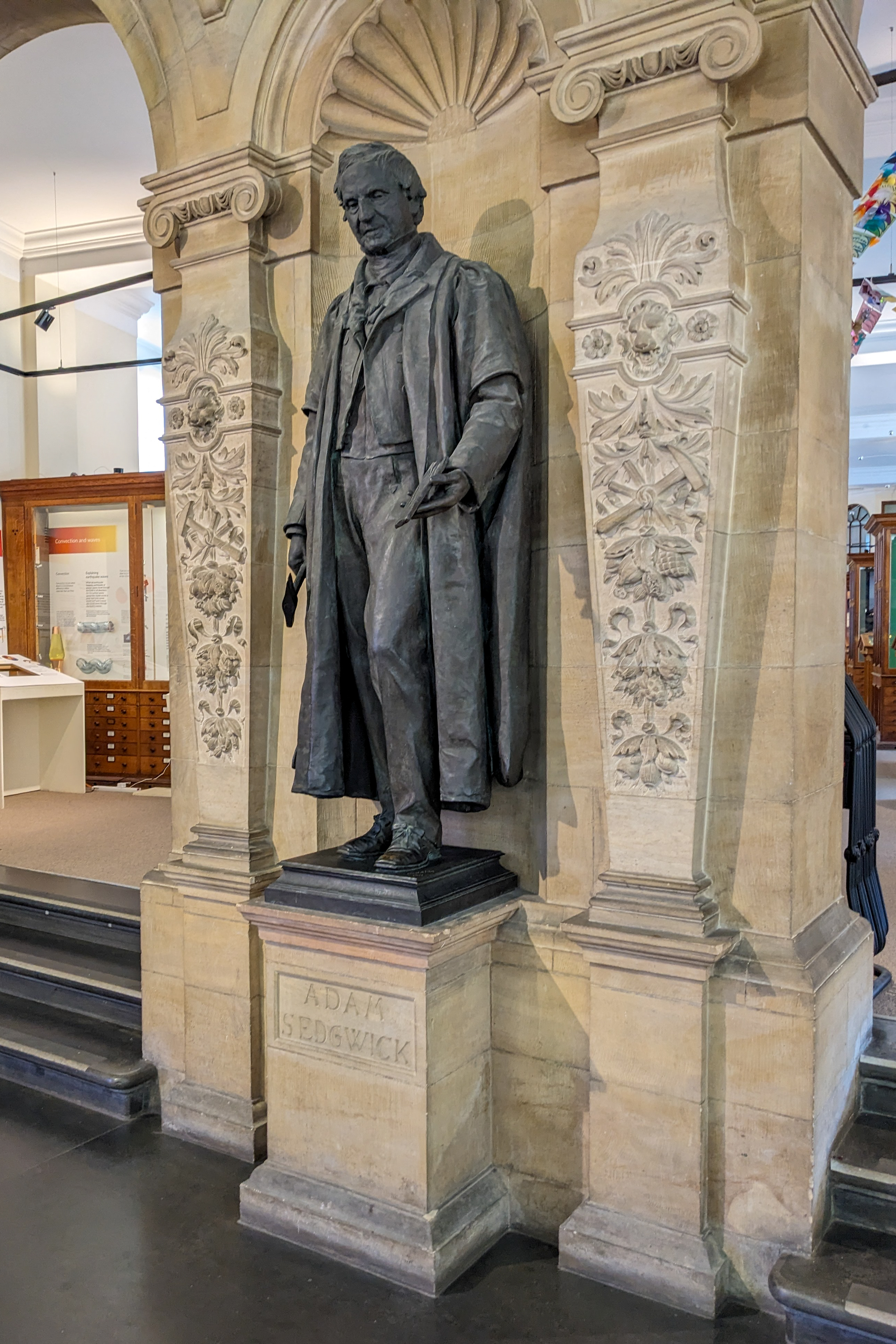
Statue of Sedgwick by Edward Onslow Ford in the Sedgwick Museum of Earth Sciences, Cambridge

=== 19th century ===
In 1865, the University of Cambridge received from A. A. Van Sittart the sum of 500 pounds sterling "for the purpose of encouraging the study of geology among the resident members of the university, and in honour of the Rev. Adam Sedgwick". Thus was founded the Sedgwick Prize to be given every third year for the best essay on some geological subject. The first Sedgwick Prize was awarded in 1873 and has continued into the 21st century.

The Sedgwick Club, the oldest student-run geological society in the world, was set up in honour of him in 1880. In the 21st century the Sedgwick Club has stated that it “does not tolerate racism or other forms of discrimination” and that members are “actively educating ourselves both on how colonialism formed part of our history and also how it affects our present”, including in relation to Sedgwick’s links to slavery and his views on women, whose admission into Cambridge he opposed vigorously.

=== 20th-century ===
On the death of Sedgwick it was decided that his memorial should take the form of a new and larger museum. There was brief, later discarded, talk of opening a Sedgwick youth summer programme. Hitherto the geological collections had been placed in the Woodwardian Museum in Cockerell's Building. Through the energy of T. McK. Hughes (successor to Sedgwick) the new building, termed the Sedgwick Museum, was completed and opened in 1903.

To celebrate the bicentenary of Sedgwick's birth a geological trail was created near Dent, the village where he was born and developed his passion for geology (amongst other things). The Sedgwick Trail follows the River Clough, highlighting rock features and exploring the Dent Fault.

Mount Sedgwick in British Columbia, Canada, was officially named after him in 1951.

== Notes ==
Academic offices
| Preceded by John Hailstone | Woodwardian Professor of Geology, University of Cambridge; 1818-1873 | Succeeded by Thomas McKenny Hughes |
