= Stone House, Cumbria =

Settlement in Cumbria, England

Coordinates: 54.269°N 2.354°W

Stone House
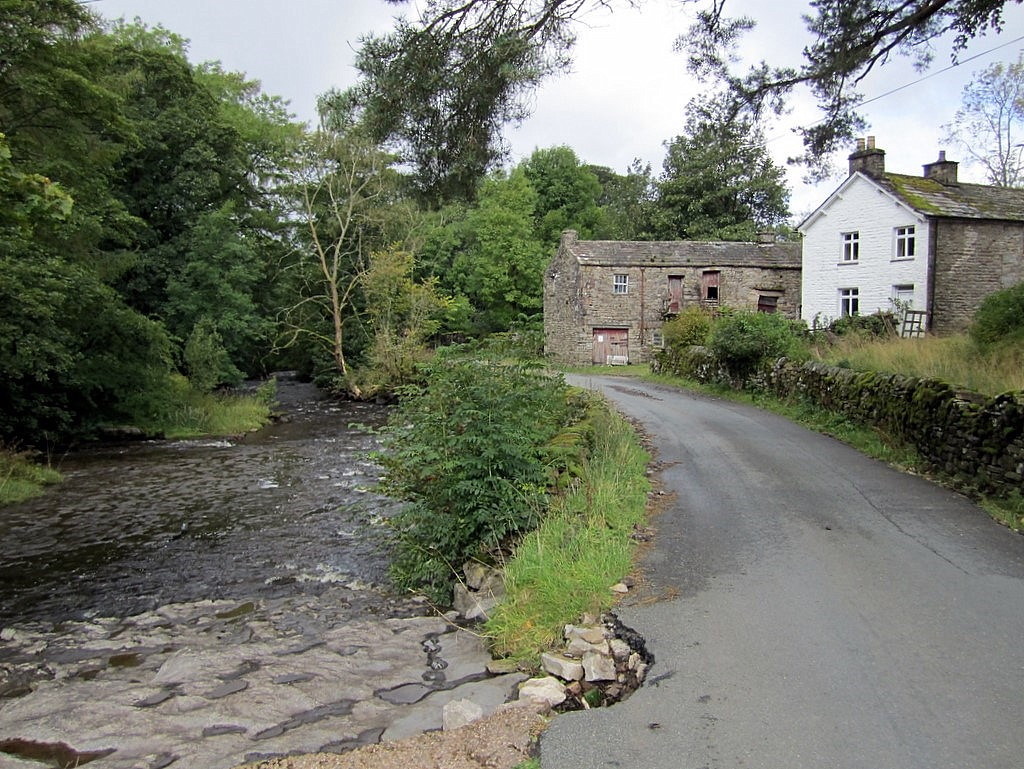
- East Stone House and the River Dee

- Location in South Lakeland Location within Cumbria
- OS grid reference: SD769860
- Civil parish: Dent
- Unitary authority: Westmorland and Furness
- Ceremonial county: Cumbria
- Region: North West
- Country: England
- Sovereign state: United Kingdom
- Post town: SEDBERGH
- Postcode district: LA10
- Dialling code: 015396
- Police: Cumbria
- Fire: Cumbria
- Ambulance: North West
- UK Parliament: Westmorland and Lonsdale

Stone House is a locality in the civil parish of Dent, in the Westmorland and Furness district, in the ceremonial county of Cumbria, England, It is at Dent Head, on the River Dee to the south-east of Cowgill and to the north-west of Newby Head.

Stone House has a farm and a public house and is near the Artengill viaduct on the Settle-Carlisle line.
