= Dent, Cumbria =

Village and civil parish in Cumbria, England

Coordinates: 54.276°N 2.452°W

Dent
- Village and parish
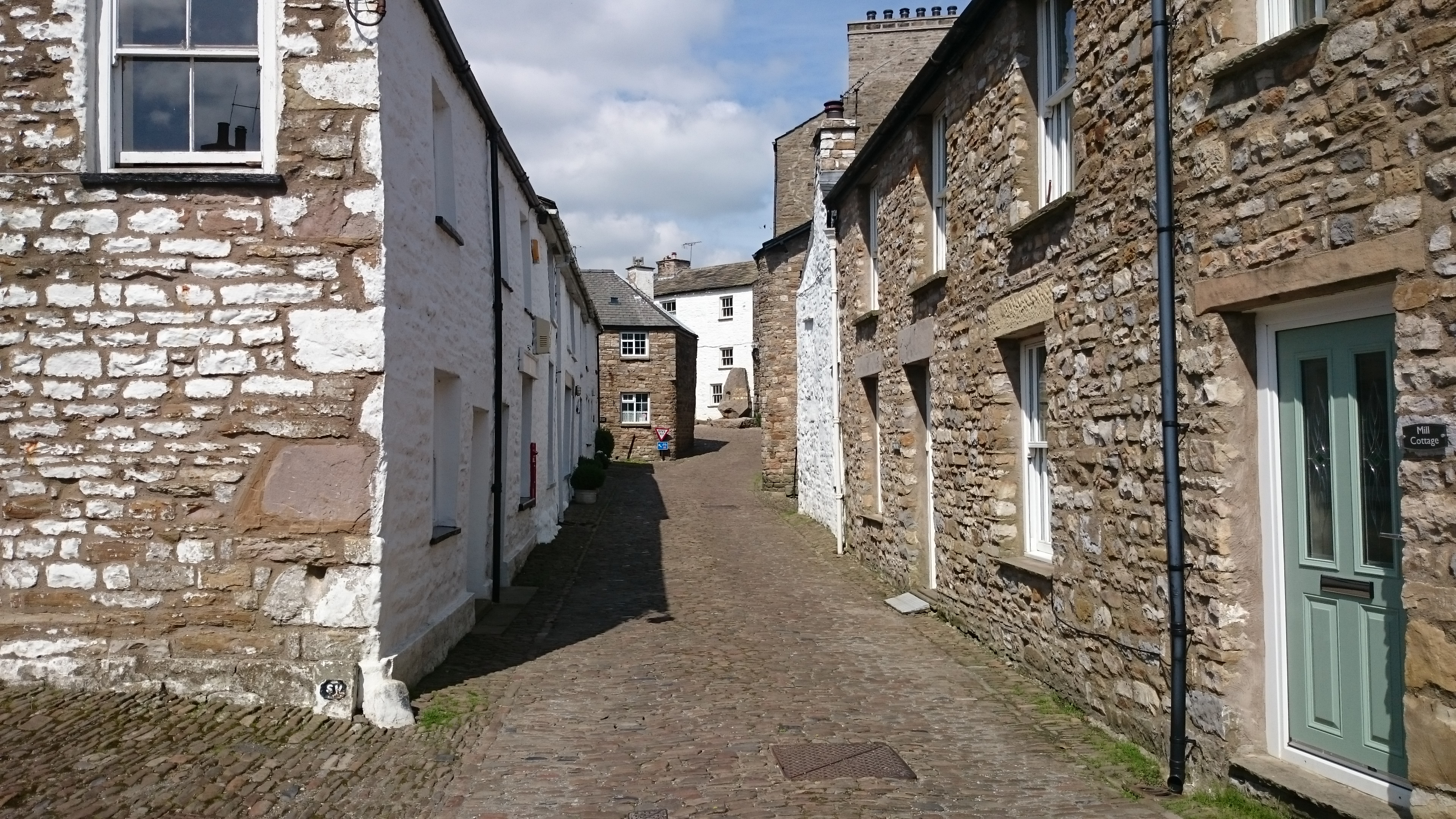
- Main Street, Dent

- Location in the former South Lakeland district Location within Cumbria
- Population: 785 (2011, including Middleton)
- OS grid reference: SD7087
- Civil parish: Dent
- Unitary authority: Westmorland and Furness
- Ceremonial county: Cumbria
- Region: North West
- Country: England
- Sovereign state: United Kingdom
- Post town: SEDBERGH
- Postcode district: LA10
- Dialling code: 015396
- Police: Cumbria
- Fire: Cumbria
- Ambulance: North West
- UK Parliament: Morecambe and Lunesdale

Dent is a village and civil parish in Cumbria, England, within the historic boundaries of the West Riding of Yorkshire. It lies in Dentdale, a narrow valley on the western slopes of the Pennines within the Yorkshire Dales National Park, 4 miles (6 km) south east of Sedbergh and 8 miles (13 km) north east of Kirkby Lonsdale. At the 2011 census, Dent and Middleton had a total population of 785.

== History ==
Dent is part of the Ewecross wapentake in the West Riding of Yorkshire. From 1894 to 1974 it was part of Sedbergh Rural District in the West Riding. From 1974, for administrative purposes, it was treated as part of the South Lakeland District in the new administrative county of Cumbria, which was abolished in April 2023.

The origin of the name is debated. Older forms include Denet (1200). It may have been taken from the hill now known as Dent Crag (2,250 ft), to be compared with another hill named Dent near Cleator in Cumberland, in which case it would derive from a pre-English Celtic term related to Old Irish dinn, dind "a hill". Alternative derivations see the name preserving the memory of the dark age kingdom known in Latin as Regione Dunutinga, founded and named after King Dunot the Great of the North Pennines.

Both place name and dialect evidence indicate that this area was settled by the Norse in the 10th century. Geoffrey Hodgson, in 2008, argued that this invasion accounts for the high frequency of the Hodgson surname in the area.

Dent was the birthplace of Thomas de Dent, Lord Chief Justice of Ireland, in the early 14th century.

Dent was the birthplace of the geologist Adam Sedgwick in 1785.

Dentdale was one of the last Yorkshire Dales to be enclosed, Dent's Enclosure Award being made in 1859.

Whilst fishing on the Dee at Dentdale in the 1840s, William Armstrong saw a waterwheel in action, supplying power to a marble quarry. It struck Armstrong that much of the available power was being wasted and it inspired him to design a successful hydraulic engine which began the accumulation of his wealth and industrial empire.

Dent, then in Yorkshire, was one of the sites for the Survey of English Dialects in the 1950s. A recording of the broadest local speech is available on the British Library's website.

== Governance ==
Dent is part of the Westmorland and Lonsdale parliamentary constituency, of which Tim Farron is the current MP representing the Liberal Democrats.

It is in the Westmorland and Furness unitary authority.

Before Brexit for the European Parliament its residents voted to elect MEP's for the North West England constituency.

== The village today ==
The Dent Brewery is an independent microbrewery in Cowgill, just above Dent.

Dent was the original site of the Dent Folk Festival and is now the site of the Dent Music and Beer Festival at the end of June. The first event was held in 2009 and was hailed as a great success.

Dent railway station on the Settle and Carlisle Railway is about 4 miles (6 km) above the village at Denthead. Despite its name, it is actually in Cowgill. Nearby, the railway goes over a viaduct. It is the highest mainline station in England at 1150 feet above sea level.

The long distance footpath the Dales Way passes through Dent, with various types of accommodation available to walkers.

== The parish ==
The parish of Dent includes the whole of Dentdale and the side valley of Deepdale. In addition to the village of Dent settlements in the parish includes the hamlets of Lenacre, Gawthrop, Cowgill and Stone House.

== See also ==
- Listed buildings in Dent, Cumbria
