= Henry Cole (minister) =

English Anglican priest & translator (1792–1858)

Henry Cole (1792 – 28 June 1858 in Islington) was an Anglican curate at Woolwich, Kent, Islington, and Sunday evening Lecturer at St Mary Somerset in the City of London. His writings included a translation of two works by Calvin as well as a translation of Martin Luther's "On the Bondage of the Will". A reviewer of his wrote, "The translator of these works (Mr. Henry Cole) is well known to many friends of God's new covenant truth, as a minister of a deep and living experience of the work of faith with power. But great bodily and heavy mental afflictions have, at times, been endured by him. During such seasons, he says— 'It has pleased God to give me strength to translate (these) two works of the beloved and immortal Calvin.'"

== Works ==
- Popular Geology Subversive of Divine Revelation (1834)
- Cole, Henry (1858). Luther Still Speaking: The Creation, a Commentary on Genesis 1-5. p. vi.
