= Gawthrop =

Hamlet in Cumbria, England

Coordinates: 54.281°N 2.473°W

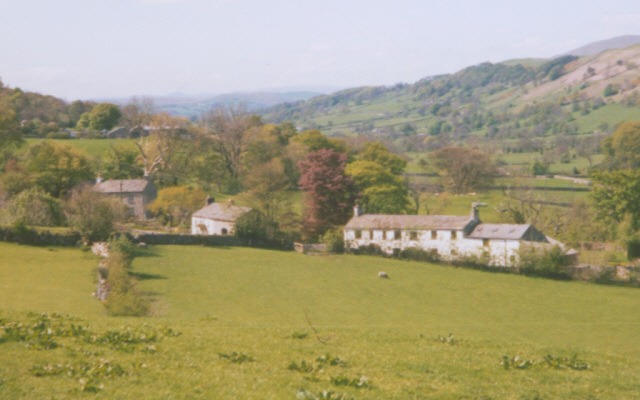
- Gawthrop village, Dentdale

- Location in South Lakeland Location within Cumbria
- OS grid reference: SD692873
- Civil parish: Dent
- Unitary authority: Westmorland and Furness
- Ceremonial county: Cumbria
- Region: North West
- Country: England
- Sovereign state: United Kingdom
- Post town: SEDBERGH
- Postcode district: LA10
- Dialling code: 015396
- Police: Cumbria
- Fire: Cumbria
- Ambulance: North West
- UK Parliament: Westmorland and Lonsdale

Gawthrop is a hamlet in the civil parish of Dent, in the Westmorland and Furness district, in the ceremonial county of Cumbria, England. Historically part of the West Riding of Yorkshire, it lies within the Yorkshire Dales National Park. From 1974 to 2023 it was in South Lakeland district. It is near the River Dee and the village of Dent.

== See also ==
- Listed buildings in Dent, Cumbria
