= Dent railway station =

Railway station in Cumbria, England

Dent
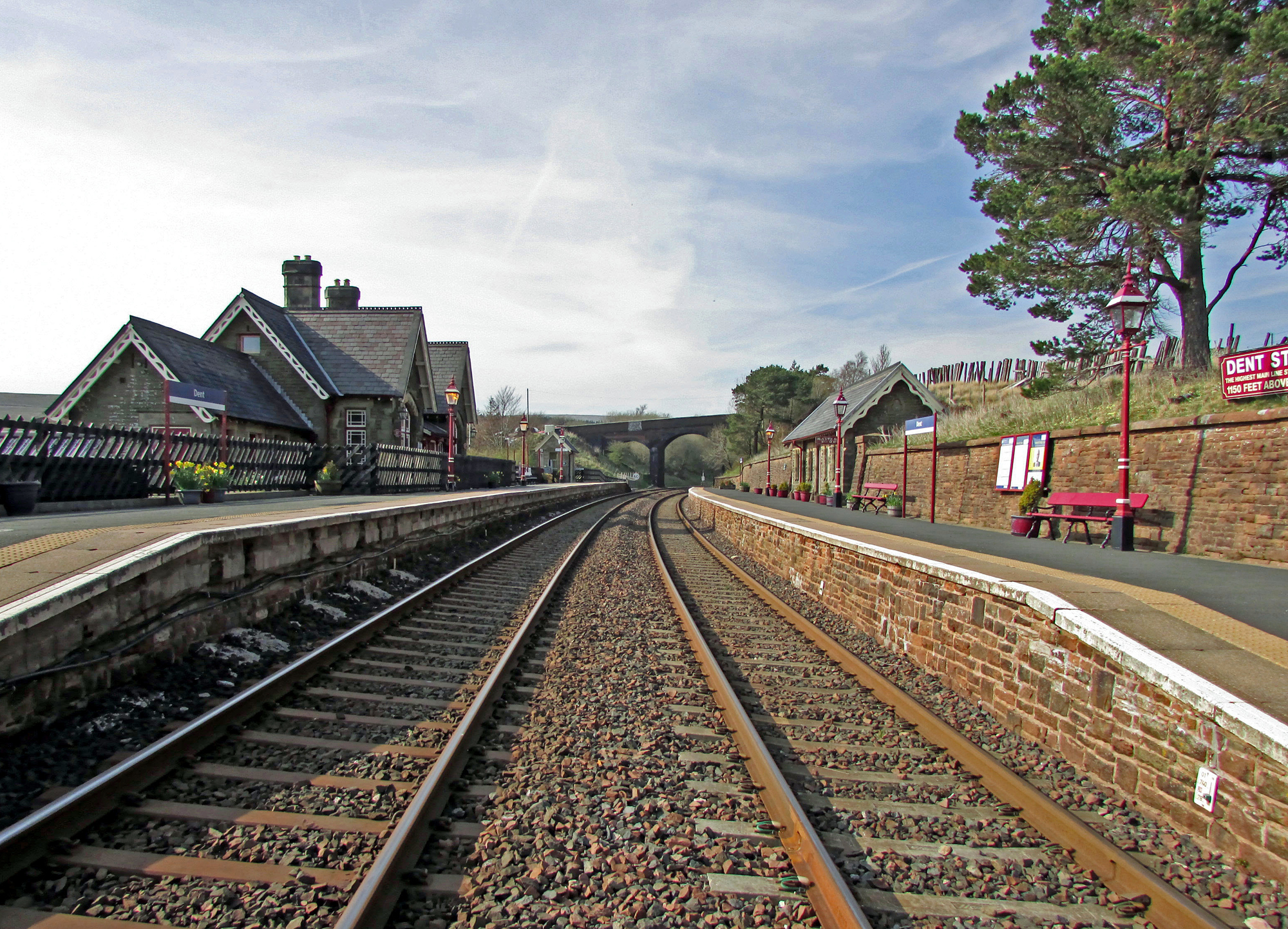
- The station seen in 2016, looking north from the Barrow crossing

General information
- Location: Cowgill, Westmorland and Furness; England
- Coordinates: 54°16′57″N 2°21′49″W
- Owner: Network Rail
- Manager: Northern Trains
- Platforms: 2
- Tracks: 2

Other information
- Station code: DNT
- Classification: DfT category F2

History
- Original company: Midland Railway
- Pre-grouping: Midland Railway
- Post-grouping: London, Midland and Scottish Railway; British Rail (London Midland Region)

Key dates
- 6 August 1877: Opened
- 4 May 1970: Closed
- 14 July 1986: Reopened

Passengers
- 2021/22: ▲8,902
- 2022/23: ▲9,236
- 2023/24: ▼9,152
- 2024/25: ▲9,598
- 2025/26: ▲10,722

Listed Building – Grade II
- Feature: Original Midland Railway station building
- Designated: 18 October 1999
- Reference no.: 1383851
Location
Notes
- Passenger statistics from the Office of Rail and Road

Dent railway station serves the villages of Cowgill and Dent, in Cumbria, England and is on the Settle and Carlisle Line, which runs between Carlisle and Leeds via Settle. The station is sited 253 miles 32 chains (408 km) from St Pancras, measured via Keighley and the former line through Cudworth. It is owned by Network Rail and managed by Northern Trains, who operate all services. It is the highest operational main line station in England.

== History ==
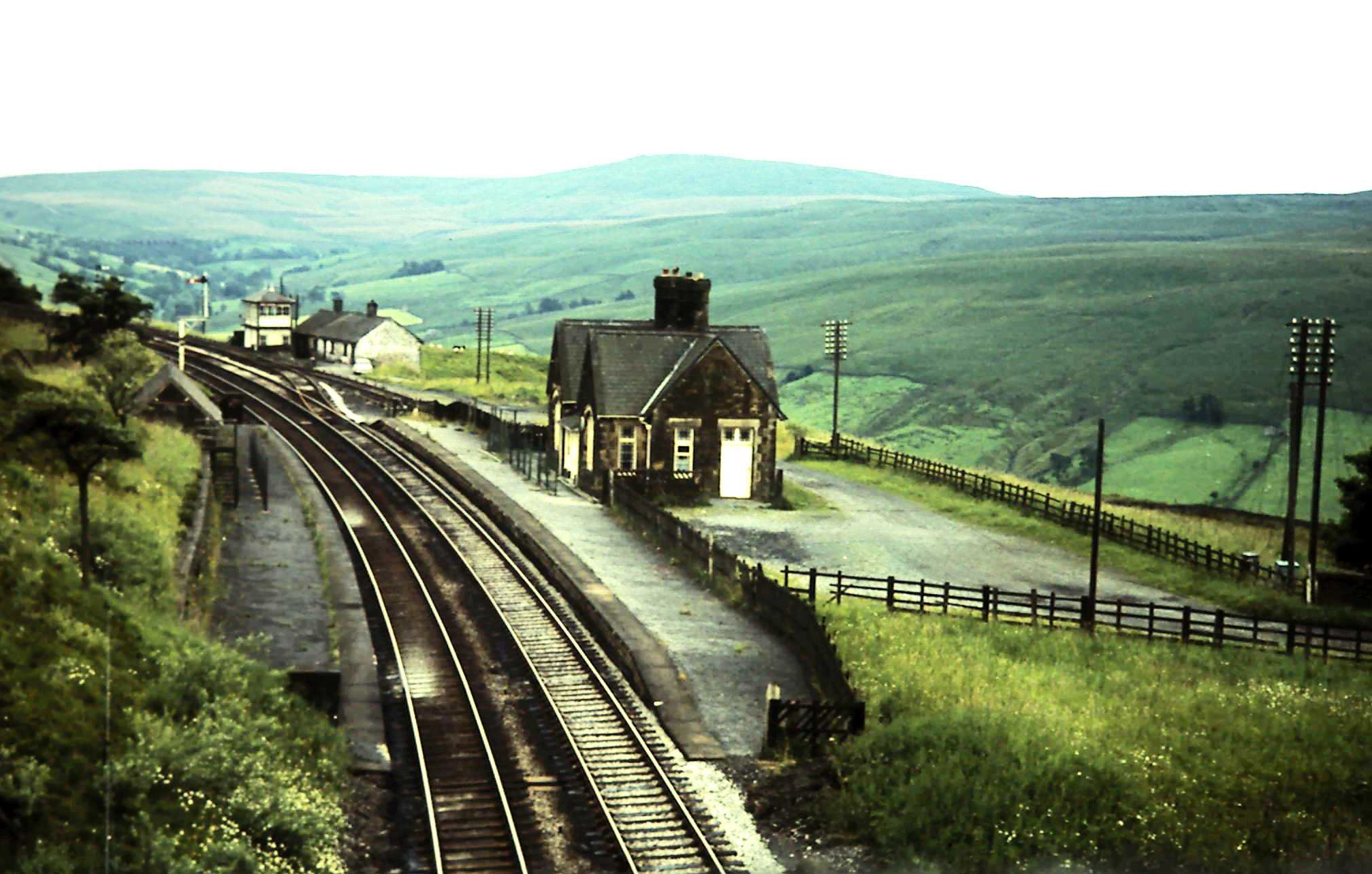
The station after closure in 1972

The station was designed by the Midland Railway's company architect John Holloway Sanders and opened in 1877. It was closed in May 1970, but was reopened by British Rail in 1986 following a campaign to maintain regular stopping services along the line.

During the 1970s, the station was rented out to Barden School in Burnley as an outdoor pursuits centre, providing accommodation for pupils whilst they participated in courses including pot holing, caving, geology and map reading.

== Location ==
Dent village lies approximately 4.8 miles (8 km) by road to the west and 400 ft (120 m) below the height of the station. Cowgill is the nearest small village, located around half a mile away but at the foot of a steep (maximum 20% or 1 in 5) spiral access road.

At an altitude of 1,150 ft (350 m) and situated between Blea Moor Tunnel and Rise Hill Tunnel immediately to its north, Dent is the highest operational railway station on the National Rail network in England.

== Facilities ==
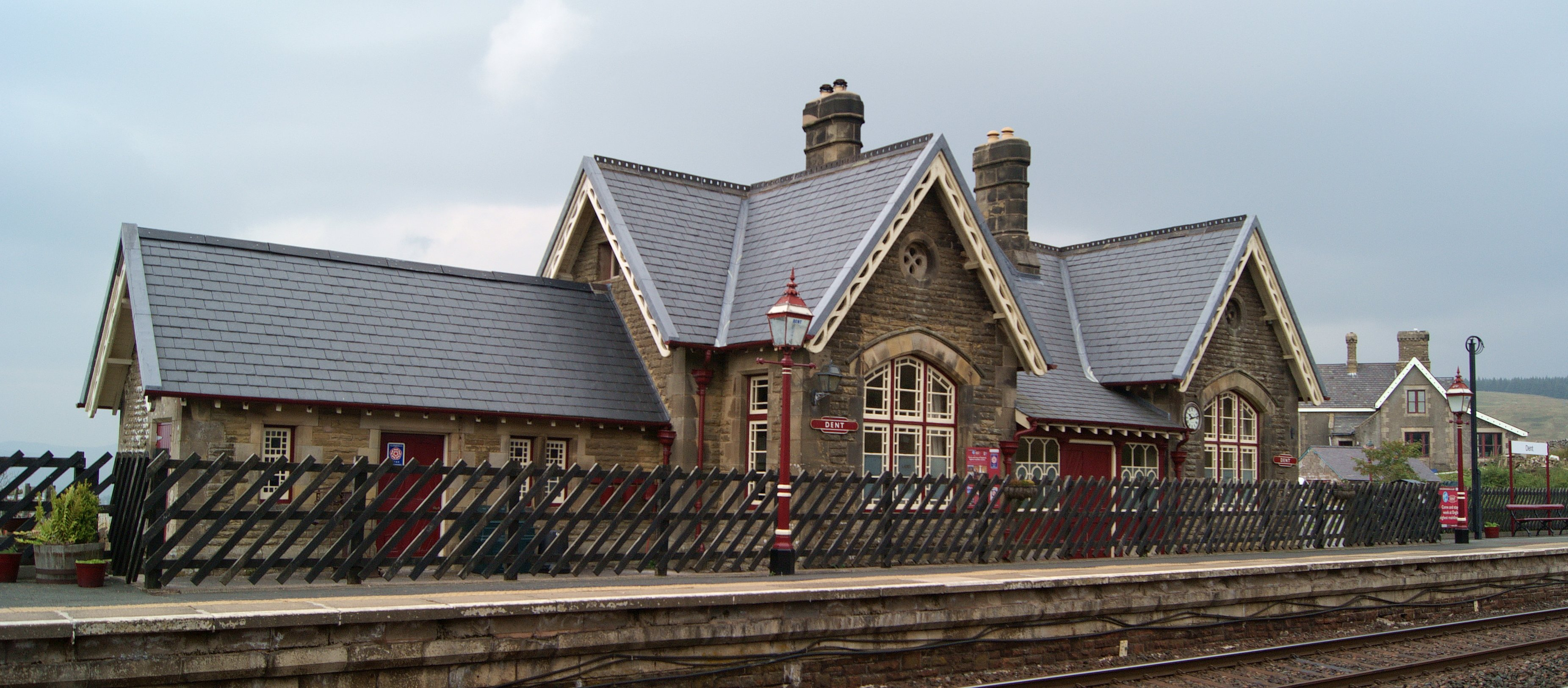
The station building, which is now a holiday cottage

There are stone-built passenger waiting rooms provided on both the northbound and southbound platforms. Access to the southbound platform is by an unguarded barrow crossing at the south end of the station for foot passengers to use; a 30 mph permanent speed restriction for non-stop trains through the station is enforced for this reason. National Rail recommends that disabled passengers should not use the southbound platform without assistance. Like most stations on the line, there are no ticket machines available as yet; travellers must buy one on the train or in advance. Train running information can be obtained by telephone on the platforms, from timetable posters or the customer information screens installed on either platform.

Old wooden snow fences are still in place on the eastern side of the station. The station buildings are now privately owned and are available to rent as holiday cottage accommodation.

== Passenger volume ==
Passenger volume at Dent
	2004–05	2005–06	2006–07	2007–08	2008–09	2009–10	2010–11	2011–12	2012–13	2013–14	2014–15	2015–16	2016–17	2017–18	2018–19	2019–20	2020–21	2021–22	2022–23	2023–24	2024–25
Entries and exits	8,181	7,171	7,328	7,087	8,218	8,724	10,558	10,852	10,440	9,742	9,054	8,484	7,248	7,988	7,894	8,126	1,786	8,902	9,236	9,152	9,598

The statistics cover twelve month periods that start in April.

== Services ==
As of the May 2026 timetable, the service consists of eight northbound trains and five or six southbound trains on weekdays and Saturdays (the other southbound trains do not stop), with six northbound and five southbound on Sundays.

Between February 2016 and March 2017, northbound trains terminated at Appleby or Armathwaite (with a bus link to Carlisle) due to repair works on the damaged embankment at Eden Brows. Services through to Carlisle resumed on 31 March 2017 upon reopening of the affected section to traffic.

Preceding station	National Rail	Following station
Ribblehead	Northern Trains; Settle and Carlisle Line	Garsdale
	Historical railways	
Ribblehead	Midland Railway; Settle and Carlisle Line	Garsdale

== Community rail ==
The station, as with all others along the Settle-Carlisle line, is part of the Settle & Carlisle Railway Trust, a Community Rail scheme.

== Bibliography ==
- Caton, Peter (2018). Remote Stations. Leicestershire: Matador. ISBN 978-1-78901-408-2.
