= Cowgill, Cumbria =

Coordinates: 54.277°N 02.368°W

Cowgill
- Village
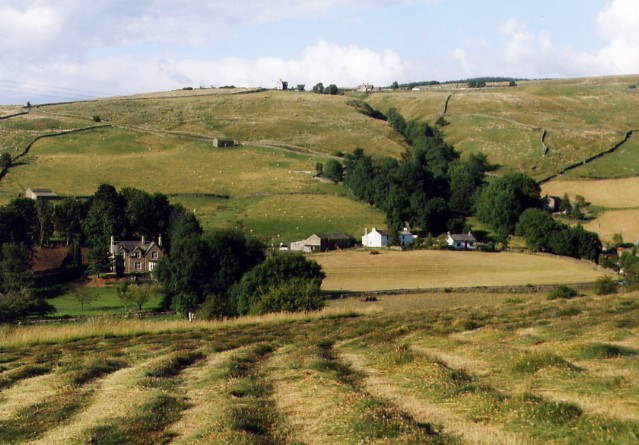
- Cowgill with Dent Station on the horizon

- Location in the former South Lakeland district Location within Cumbria
- OS grid reference: SD755875
- Civil parish: Dent
- Unitary authority: Westmorland and Furness
- Ceremonial county: Cumbria
- Region: North West
- Country: England
- Sovereign state: United Kingdom
- Post town: SEDBERGH
- Postcode district: LA10
- Dialling code: 01539
- Police: Cumbria
- Fire: Cumbria
- Ambulance: North West
- UK Parliament: Westmorland and Lonsdale

Cowgill is a village in Westmorland and Furness, Cumbria, England. It is within the historic boundaries of the West Riding of Yorkshire, and is located 9 miles (14 km) south east of Sedbergh. The village is served by Dent railway station on the Settle-Carlisle Line with services north towards Appleby-in-Westmorland and Carlisle and south towards Skipton and Leeds. The village has one church, the Anglican Church of St John the Evangelist, Cowgill.

== Governance ==
Cowgill is part of the Westmorland and Lonsdale parliamentary constituency, of which Tim Farron is the current MP representing the Liberal Democrats.

For the European Parliament its residents voted to elect MEP's for the North West England constituency.

== See also ==
- Listed buildings in Dent, Cumbria
