= Ainderby railway station =

Disused railway station in North Yorkshire, England

Ainderby
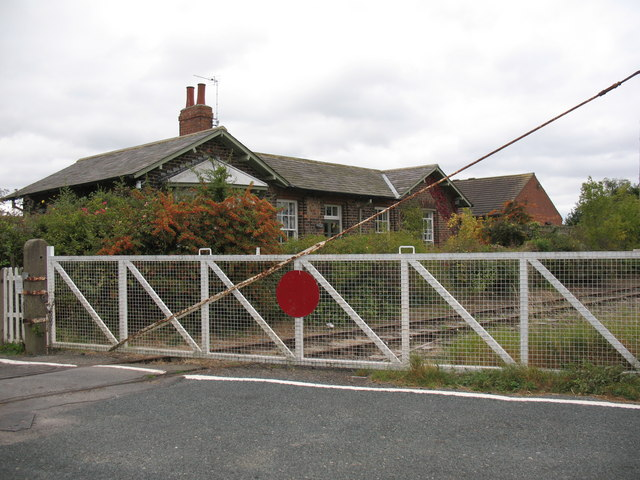
- The old station at Morton-on-Swale in September 2007

General information
- Location: Morton-on-Swale, North Yorkshire; England
- Coordinates: 54.324499°N 1.498900°W
- Grid reference: SE326922

Other information
- Status: Disused

History
- Original company: York, Newcastle and Berwick Railway
- Pre-grouping: North Eastern Railway
- Post-grouping: London and North Eastern Railway

Key dates
- 6 March 1848: Station opened
- 26 April 1954: Station closed
Location

Ainderby railway station was a railway station serving the villages of Ainderby Steeple and Morton-on-Swale in North Yorkshire, England.

== History ==
Opened by the York, Newcastle and Berwick Railway, it became part of the London and North Eastern Railway during the Grouping of 1923. The line then passed on to the Eastern Region of British Railways on nationalisation in 1948. It was then closed by British Railways when the Northallerton to Hawes service was withdrawn in April 1954.

== The site today ==
Track still passes through the station site, providing rail access for the Wensleydale Railway which operates west from Leeming Bar. The line also sees occasional train loads of military equipment heading to or from Catterick Garrison via Redmire - these are operated by freight company DB Cargo UK on behalf of the Ministry of Defence.

Ainderby has been closed since 1954 however the Wensleydale Railway plans to reopen this station (as part of the extension to Northallerton). The former station house (like several others along the route) has survived demolition and is used as a private residence.

Disused railways
Scruton; Line & station closed	North Eastern Railway; York, Newcastle and Berwick Railway	Northallerton; Line closed, station open
Preceding station	Heritage railways	Following station
Proposed extension
Scruton towards Leyburn	Wensleydale Railway	Northallerton Terminus
