= Newton-le-Willows, North Yorkshire =

Village and civil parish in North Yorkshire, England

Coordinates: 54.30189°N 1.67078°W

Newton-le-Willows
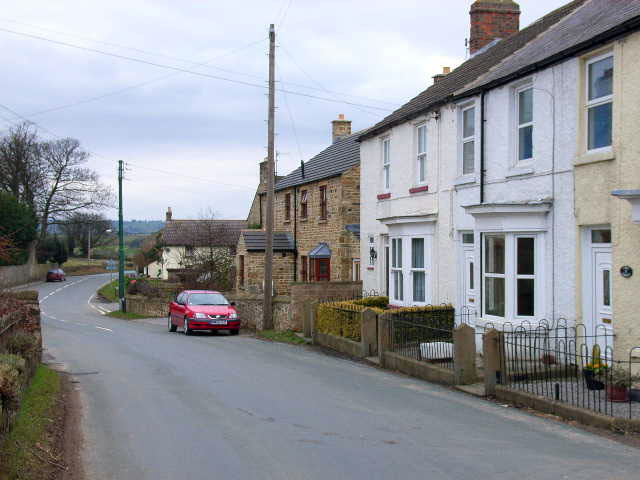
- Newton-le-Willows

- Location within North Yorkshire
- Population: 454 (2011)
- OS grid reference: SE215905
  - London: 200 mi (320 km) SSE
- Civil parish: Newton-le-Willows
- Unitary authority: North Yorkshire
- Ceremonial county: North Yorkshire
- Region: Yorkshire and the Humber
- Country: England
- Sovereign state: United Kingdom
- Post town: Bedale
- Postcode district: DL8
- Police: North Yorkshire
- Fire: North Yorkshire
- Ambulance: Yorkshire

Newton-le-Willows is a village and civil parish in the county of North Yorkshire, England, 3 miles (4.8 km) west of Bedale. Historically, it is part of the North Riding of Yorkshire and the Wapentake of Hang East. From 1974 to 2023 it was part of the district of Richmondshire, it is now administered by the unitary North Yorkshire Council.

Newton-le-Willows used to have a railway station on the Wensleydale Railway. The station opened with the Bedale to Leyburn extension of the line in 1856. In 1877 the station was renamed as Jervaulx to avoid confusion with the other Newton-le-Willows railway station near to St Helens. The stations on the line were all closed in 1954, but the one at Jervaulx was used beyond the closure date to transport pupils to and from Aysgarth School on excursions. Whilst the Wensleydale Railway has reopened as a heritage railway, the station has remained closed.

== Education ==
Aysgarth School is a boarding Preparatory school located 0.5 miles (0.8 km) to the south–west of the village. It was founded in 1877 and was originally based near Aysgarth but moved to its current site in 1890.

== See also ==
- Listed buildings in Newton-le-Willows, North Yorkshire
