= Bedale railway station =

Railway station in North Yorkshire, England

Bedale
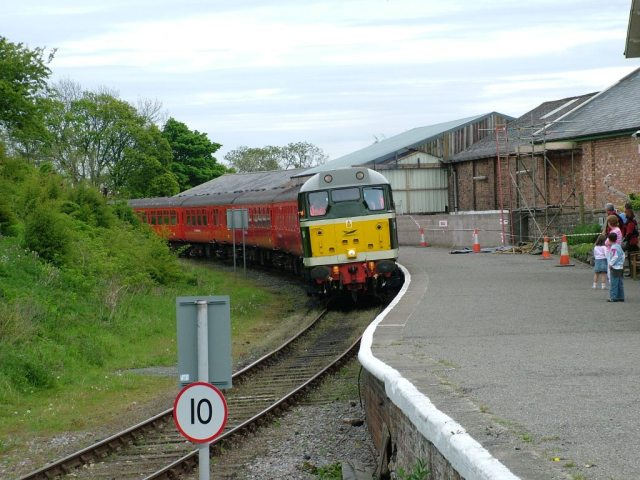

General information
- Location: Bedale, North Yorkshire; England
- Coordinates: 54.289°N 1.588°W
- Grid reference: SE269882
- System: Station on heritage railway
- Manager: Wensleydale Railway
- Platforms: 1

History
- Original company: York, Newcastle and Berwick Railway
- Pre-grouping: North Eastern Railway
- Post-grouping: London and North Eastern Railway

Key dates
- 1 February 1855: Opened
- 26 April 1954: Closed
- 2004: Reopened
Location

Bedale railway station is on the Wensleydale Railway and serves the town of Bedale in North Yorkshire, England. The station was opened in 1855, and closed by British Railways in 1954. It was re-opened as part of the heritage Wensleydale Railway in 2004.

== History ==
First opened by the Bedale and Leyburn Railway in November 1855, the station very nearly did not get built at all as the initial plans for the Leeming to Leyburn route would have completely bypassed the town. Following a major outcry in the locality, this plan was changed, and by May 1856, passenger services had started running between Northallerton and Leyburn. These were subsequently extended to Hawes and Hawes Junction (later Garsdale) by the North Eastern Railway in October 1878.

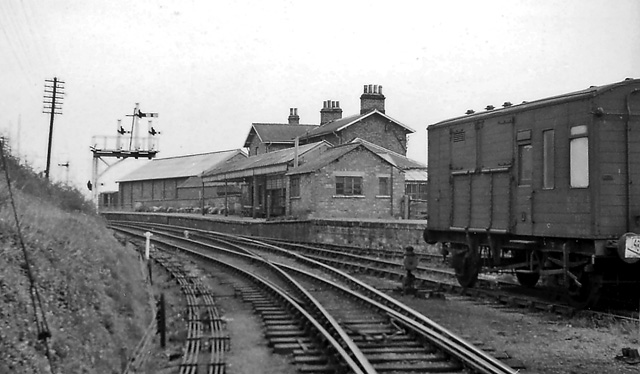
Bedale Station in April 1961

Although the service between Bedale and Leeming was doubled by the turn of the century, the station never received a second platform, and the line became single again before passing through the adjacent level crossing. However, goods trains could be left on the line without a platform to allow passenger services to take priority on the line. Services were always modest at best, with a basic timetable of between five and seven trains each way operating right up until the closure of the line to passengers in April 1954.

The platform was given a moderate facelift in 1970 when the Royal Train was stabled overnight in the station. The Queen was on a ceremonial visit to the nearby Catterick military complex. In the 1980s, the station buildings were used as a cosmetic oils factory.

The station remained open for goods traffic for many years after the cessation of passenger trains (until 1982) and even then the platform and signal box survived (the latter to supervise the crossing and the last remaining passing loop on the otherwise single track route). Limestone trains from Redmire to the steelworks at Redcar ended in December 1992, but the line was subsequently retained for use by the Ministry of Defence to move military hardware to and from Catterick Garrison via a new transshipment facility at Redmire.

== Preservation ==
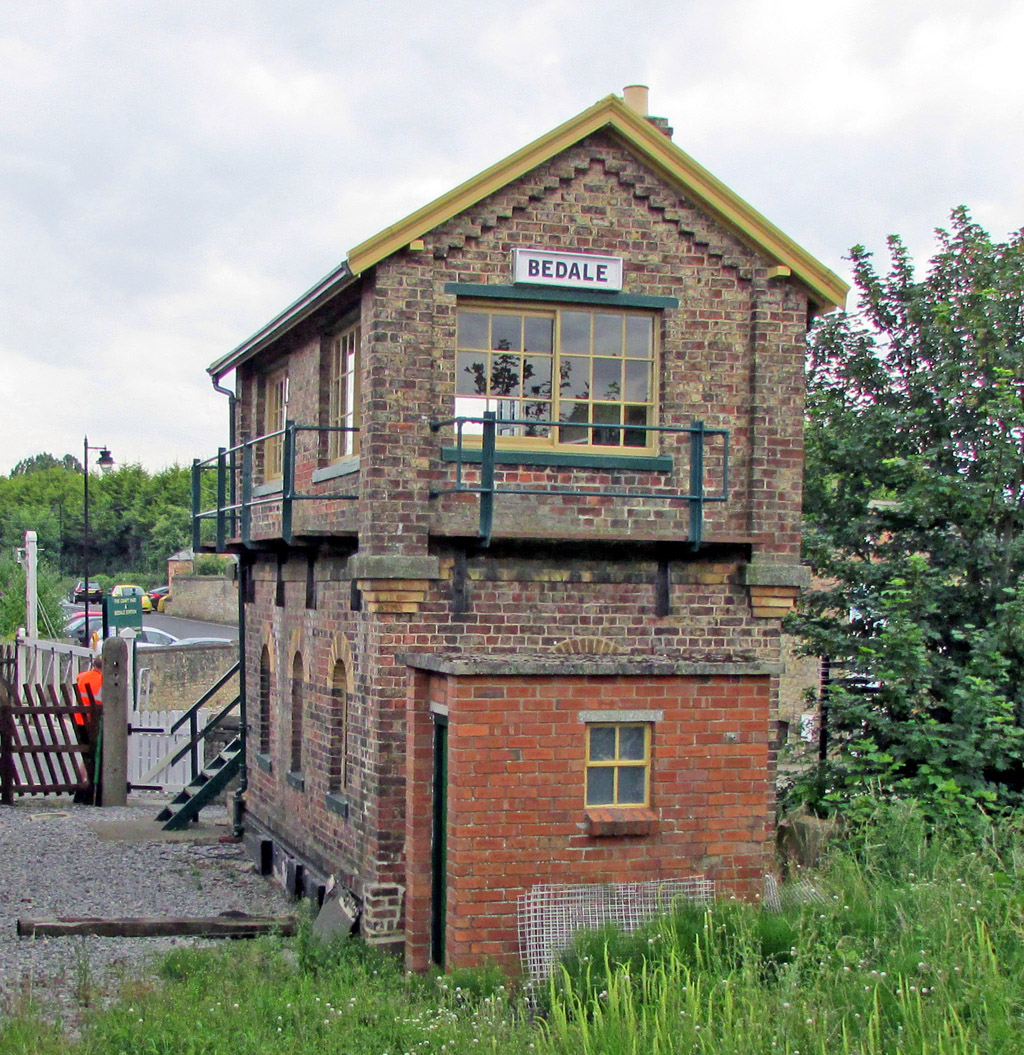
Bedale signal box in service during July 2014

The Wensleydale Railway Company took over the station after leasing the branch from Railtrack in the spring of 2003, with passenger services returning to Bedale in 2004. The WRC use the surviving station building and the adjacent brick-built signal box. The station is 7 miles 37 chains (12 km) west of the boundary with the Network Rail lines at Northallerton.

Trains currently operate between Scruton and Leyburn, as the sections from Scruton to Northallerton and Leyburn to Redmire are currently out of passenger use. Most eastbound trains terminate at Leeming Bar. The company hopes to eventually rebuild the currently derelict section of the line west of Redmire and run services all the way from Northallerton to Garsdale.

== The signal box ==
The signal box and the station are actually in Aiskew by parish boundary definitions (the traditional parish boundary was Bedale Beck). However, the signal box was given Grade II Listed Status in February 1993 and as such, it is now in the Bedale Conservation area. The box is believed to have been designed by G. T. Andrews.

Preceding station	Heritage railways	Following station
Finghall towards Leyburn	Wensleydale Railway	Leeming Bar Terminus
Historical railways
Crakehall; Line open, station closed	North Eastern Railway; York, Newcastle and Berwick Railway	Leeming Bar; Line and station open
