= Jervaulx railway station =

Disused railway station in North Yorkshire, England

Jervaulx

General information
- Location: Newton-le-Willows, North Yorkshire; England
- Coordinates: 54.299803°N 1.675314°W
- Grid reference: SE212894
- Platforms: 1

Other information
- Status: Disused

History
- Original company: Bedale and Leyburn Railway
- Pre-grouping: North Eastern Railway
- Post-grouping: London and North Eastern Railway

Key dates
- 19 May 1856: Opened as Newton-le-Willows
- 1 December 1877: Renamed Jervaulx
- 26 April 1954: Closed
Location

Jervaulx railway station was a railway station in Newton-le-Willows, North Yorkshire, England. Originally named after this place, it was renamed after Jervaulx, about 4 mi (6 km) to the southwest and known for its former abbey, to distinguish it from Newton-le-Willows in Merseyside. Reputedly the Marquess of Aylesbury was upset by many of his guests arriving at the wrong destination.

== History ==
Opened by the Bedale and Leyburn Railway, the station was initially directly south of the crossroads in the village, but was moved further west on its main site in 1862 at a cost of £38,000. The Wensleydale railway was taken over by the North Eastern Railway, which became part of the London and North Eastern Railway during the Grouping of 1923. The line then passed on to the Eastern Region of British Railways on nationalisation in 1948. It was then closed by the British Transport Commission in April 1954 (along with all of the other stations on the route) when the Northallerton to Hawes passenger service was withdrawn. However, as the line remained open for freight, the station was used after official closure by pupils from the nearby Aysgarth School.

== The site today ==
Track still passes through the station site, providing rail access for the Wensleydale Railway which operates west from Leeming Bar. The station site is 1 mile 1,300 yards (2.798 km) west of Crakehall railway station site, and 1 mile 1,350 yards (2.844 km) east of Finghall. The station building still stands and is used as a private dwelling; trains on the Wensleydale Railway do not stop here.

Preceding station	Historical railways	Following station
Finghall; Line and station open	North Eastern Railway; Bedale and Leyburn Railway	Crakehall; Line open, station closed
