= Basil Guy =

Basil Guy may refer to:

- Basil Guy (Royal Navy officer) (1882–1956), English recipient of the Victoria Cross
- Basil Guy (bishop) (1910–1975), English bishop
