= Spennithorne railway station =

Disused railway station in North Yorkshire, England

Spennithorne
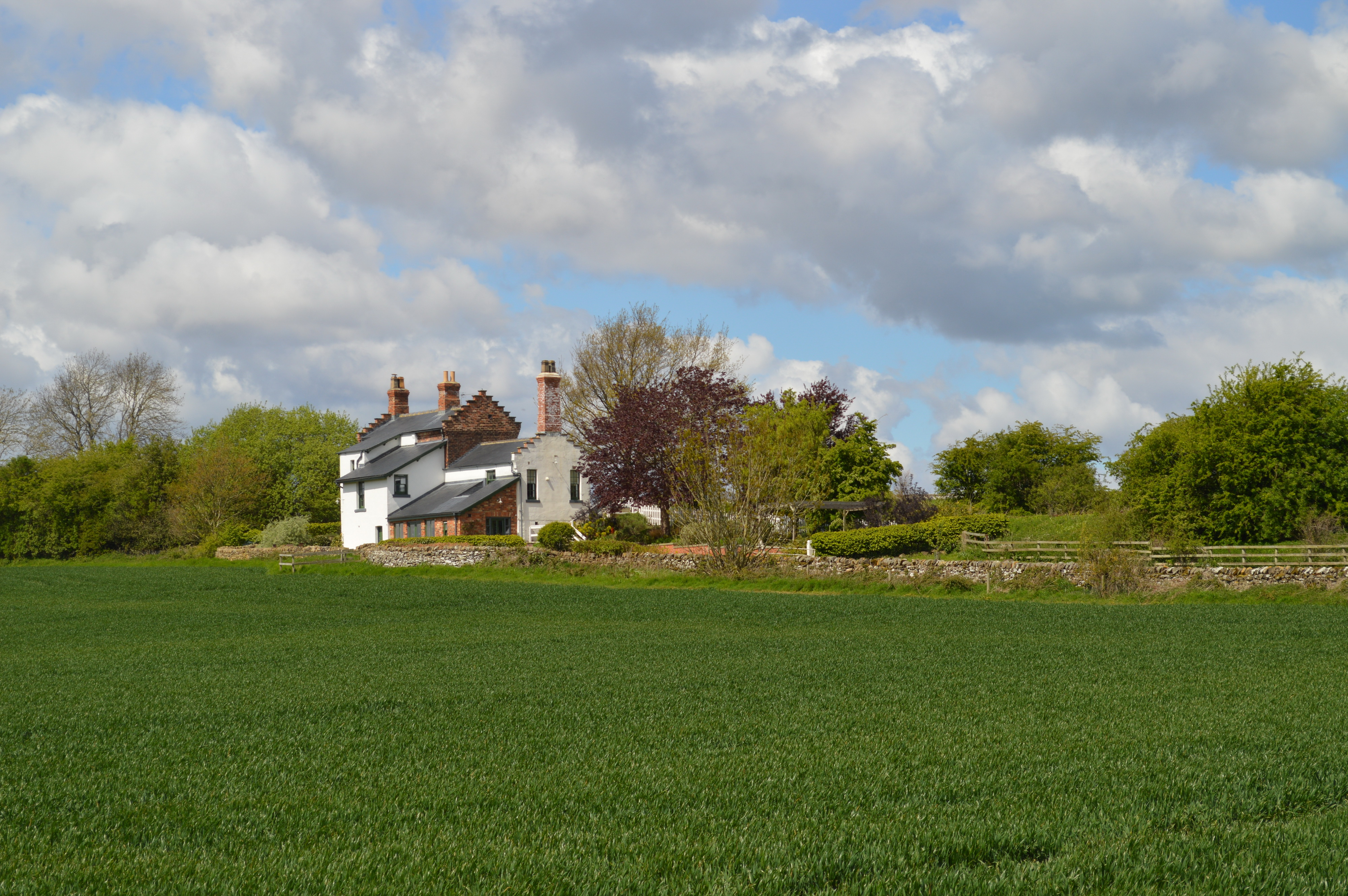
- Site of the former station in May 2015

General information
- Location: Spennithorne, North Yorkshire; England
- Coordinates: 54.306050°N 1.780200°W
- Grid reference: SE144900
- Platforms: 1

Other information
- Status: Disused

History
- Original company: Bedale and Leyburn Railway
- Pre-grouping: North Eastern Railway
- Post-grouping: London and North Eastern Railway

Key dates
- 19 May 1856: Opened
- 1 March 1917: Closed
- 18 September 1920: Reopened
- 26 April 1954: Closed
Location

Spennithorne railway station was on the Wensleydale Railway, in North Yorkshire, England.

The station was opened by the Bedale and Leyburn Railway on 19 May 1856, and served the village of Spennithorne. It closed temporarily on 1 March 1917, before reopening on 18 September 1920. It closed permanently on 26 April 1954.

The station consisted of a two-storey station master's house and a single-storey building for the station office and waiting room. There were no sidings or goods facilities. Mr Francis Johnson was the station master for three years prior to 1908 after which he moved to Scruton railway station. He had a reputation for beautifying the stations under his charge.

The station was 1 mile (1.6 km) northeast of Spennithorne, just within the civil parish of Constable Burton. Business was always likely to be small at this remote location, and in the 30 years to 1914 the station averaged 2,616 passengers a year, with receipts of £289.

Preceding station	Historical railways	Following station
Leyburn; Line and station open	North Eastern Railway; Bedale and Leyburn Railway	Constable Burton; Line open, station closed
