= Langlands Farm =

Farm in Morton-on-Swale, North Yorkshire, England

Coordinates: 54°18′47″N 1°29′46″W

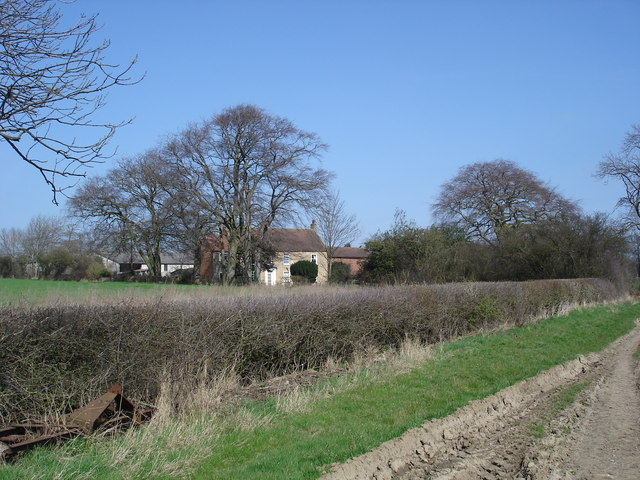
The farm, in 2007

Langlands Farm is a farm with a historic farmhouse, in Morton-on-Swale, a village in North Yorkshire, in England.

The farm lies south of the village. It is named after a former owner with the surname Langland. The farmhouse was built in the mid or late 18th century, for John Wright. It was extended to the left in the 20th century. The building was grade II* listed in 1986.

The farmhouse is built of rendered brick, with an eaves band, and a machine tile roof with stone coping and shaped kneelers. It has two storeys, four bays, and a single-bay extension to the left. On the front is a doorway with pilasters, Ionic capitals, a fanlight, a frieze and a dentilled cornice. The windows are a mix of sashes and casements, and at the rear is an arched stair window. Inside, there is an early staircase.

== See also ==
- Grade II* listed buildings in North Yorkshire (district)
- Listed buildings in Morton-on-Swale
