= Morton-on-Swale =

Village and civil parish in North Yorkshire, England

Coordinates: 54°19′21″N 1°29′57″W

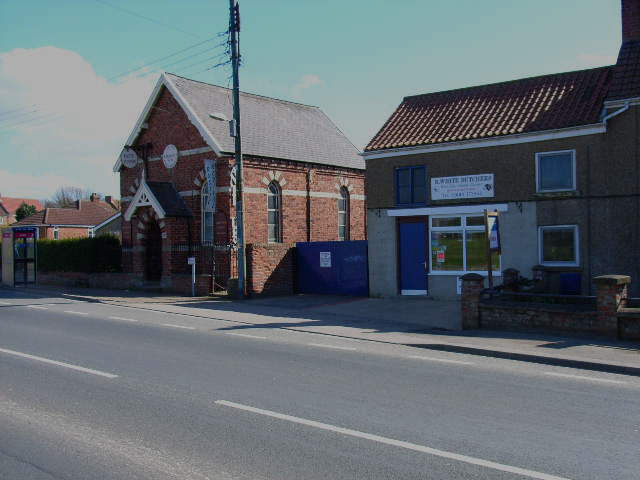
- Morton-on-Swale

- Location within North Yorkshire
- Population: 536 (2011 census)
- OS grid reference: SE327920
- Unitary authority: North Yorkshire
- Ceremonial county: North Yorkshire
- Region: Yorkshire and the Humber
- Country: England
- Sovereign state: United Kingdom
- Post town: NORTHALLERTON
- Postcode district: DL7
- Police: North Yorkshire
- Fire: North Yorkshire
- Ambulance: Yorkshire
- UK Parliament: Richmond and Northallerton

Morton-on-Swale is a village and civil parish in North Yorkshire, England. It lies on the A684 road about 4 miles (6.4 km) west of the county town of Northallerton. It is less than 1 mile (1.6 km) to the village of Ainderby Steeple. As the name suggests it lies on the River Swale.

== History ==
The toponymy of the village is derived from the Old English word mōr for Moor and the word tun for farm, with the addition of the geographical reference to the nearby river, giving Moor farm on the River Swale.

The village is mentioned twice in the Domesday Book as Moretun. At the time of the Norman invasion, the lands were part of the manor of Kirkby Fleetham held by Gospatric, son of Arnketil, with some lands held by Grim. Afterwards the descent of the manor followed that of Ainderby Steeple.

== Governance ==
The village is in the Richmond and Northallerton UK Parliament constituency. Morton-on-Swale electoral ward stretches north to Danby Wiske and had a population at the 2011 Census of 1,761. From 1974 to 2023 Morton-on-Swale was part of the Hambleton District of North Yorkshire, it is now administered by the unitary North Yorkshire Council.

== Geography ==
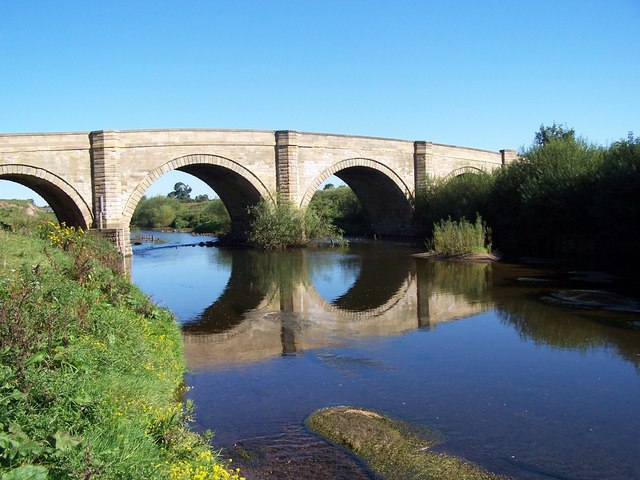
Morton Bridge and the River Swale

The parish boundary is formed by the River Swale on the west and River Wiske on the east and south. The northern boundary runs just south of Thrintoft. The neighbouring parishes are Ainderby Steeple, Thrintoft, Scruton, Leeming, Gatenby, Maunby, Newby Wiske and Warlaby. The village straddles the A684 road between Northallerton and the A1M motorway. The villages of Ainderby Steeple and Thrintoft are within. The highest point in the village is 131 feet (40 m) at the recreation ground.

In September 2000, the Environment Agency installed a river level monitoring station to measure the water levels in the Swale. The range is between 0.13 metres (0.43 ft) and 5.8 metres (19 ft). The highest recorded level at this point was 6.47 metres (21.2 ft) on 6 September 2008.

The Wensleydale Railway Association extended its line, that runs from Redmire and Leeming Bar, to run just to the north of the village with a temporary station at Northallerton West and plans to go as far as the East Coast Main Line. This has meant the construction of two level crossings in the village.

== Demography ==
Population
Year	1881	1891	1901	1911	1921	1931	1951	1961	2001	2011
Total	273	225	186	188	213	184	224	230	529	536

The 2001 UK census showed that the population was split 48.6% male to 51.4% female. The religious constituency was made of 86.4% Christian and the rest stating no religion or not stating at all. The ethnic make-up was 98.1% White British, 1.13% White other and 0.75% Mixed Asian. There were 242 dwellings.

The 2011 UK census showed that the population was split 46.6% male to 53.4% female. The religious constituency was made of 71.3% Christian, 0.4% Buddhist and the rest stating no religion or not stating at all. The ethnic make-up was 95.5% White British with the rest consisting of 4.3% each White Other and 0.2% Asian British. There were 250 dwellings.

== Community and culture ==
There is no church in the village, though the Methodists erected a chapel in 1815 which is now a Grade II listed private dwelling. The United Methodist Free Church also built a chapel in 1879, which is also private dwellings. The village is served by three bus routes running from Northallerton to RAF Leeming, Bedale and Hawes. There is one public house, a butchers shop and a village store that includes the local post office.

== Education ==
Ainderby Steeple Church of England Primary School is on Station Lane, Morton-on-Swale which is within the catchment area of Northallerton School, which provides secondary education and sixth form facilities. Near the primary school is The Dales School, a special co-educational school for those with severe and complex learning requirements. It provides some post 16 years old education.

== See also ==
- Listed buildings in Morton-on-Swale
