= Morton-on-Swale Village Hall =

Building in Morton-on-Swale, North Yorkshire, England

Coordinates: 54°19′23″N 1°29′49″W

Morton-on-Swale Village Hall is a historic building in Morton-on-Swale, a village in North Yorkshire, in England.

The building was constructed in 1815 as a Wesleyan Methodist Church. In 1927, it was closed, due to low attendance, and sold to the owner of Ainderby Hall. In 1936, it was sold to four local people, who converted it into a parish hall, with the entrance moved to the side of the building. It was used for a variety of recreational purposes until 1957, when it was leased to North Yorkshire County Council and used for the education of children and adults with additional needs, although it remained used by the local community in the evenings. The council constructed an extension with a kitchen and toilet, and added a false ceiling in the main hall, converting the balcony into a loft. In the 2000s and 2010s the building was renovated, the work including a new roof, replacement windows, and the removal of the false ceiling. The building has been Grade II listed since 1986.

The hall is constructed of red brick, and has a hipped Welsh slate roof with cast iron cresting and finials. It has two storeys and three bays, the central bay with a recessed arch, and the windows have round-arched heads. The ground floor window in the centre has a stuccoed rusticated surround and a dated double keystone, and above it is a stone panel.

== See also ==
- Listed buildings in Morton-on-Swale
