= Finghall railway station =

Railway station in North Yorkshire, England

Finghall
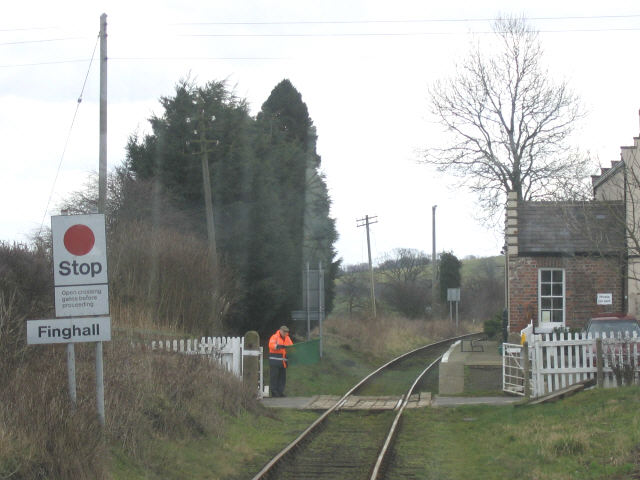

General information
- Location: Finghall, North Yorkshire; England
- Coordinates: 54.305860°N 1.718200°W
- Grid reference: SE183900
- System: Station on heritage railway
- Manager: Wensleydale Railway
- Platforms: 1

History
- Original company: Bedale and Leyburn Railway
- Pre-grouping: North Eastern Railway
- Post-grouping: London and North Eastern Railway

Key dates
- 19 May 1856: Opened as Finghall Lane
- 26 April 1954: Closed
- 23 December 2004: Reopened as Finghall
Location

Finghall railway station is on the Wensleydale Railway and serves the village of Finghall in North Yorkshire, England. Adjacent to the station is a manually operated gated crossing on the single-track Wensleydale Railway.

The station was opened as Finghall Lane by the Bedale and Leyburn Railway on 19 May 1856. It was closed in April 1954, but was used sporadically between 1984 and 1988 for detraining passengers on DalesRail services. The station was used in the 1970s and 1980s by the BBC Television series All Creatures Great and Small, renamed as "Rainby Halt" for the show, with the signboard advising passengers bound for Darrowby to "alight here"; no passenger trains called at the station during that time.

The station was reopened by the Wensleydale Railway on 23 December 2004 after being closed for half a century.

Trains operate on a request-stop basis, whereby if passengers on the platform signal to the driver, then the train will halt, but if there are no passengers the train will continue through without stopping. Passengers wishing to alight at Finghall must inform a member of the train crew and they will take action to ensure the train stops at the station. Only two or three out of the ten trains a day actually halt at Finghall, and often this is just to ensure good timekeeping.

Preceding station	Heritage railways	Following station
Leyburn Terminus	Wensleydale Railway	Bedale towards Leeming Bar
Historical railways
Constable Burton; Line open, station closed	North Eastern Railway; Bedale and Leyburn Railway	Jervaulx; Line open, station closed
