= Crakehall railway station =

Disused railway station in North Yorkshire, England

Crakehall
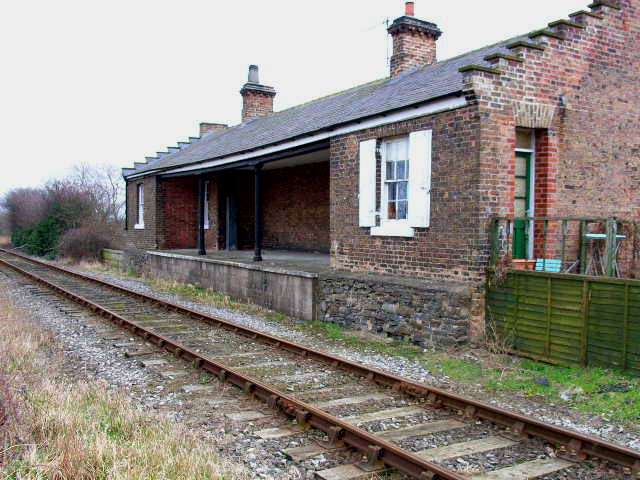

General information
- Location: Crakehall, North Yorkshire; England
- Coordinates: 54.297927°N 1.633494°W
- Grid reference: SE239892
- Platforms: 1

Other information
- Status: Disused

History
- Original company: Bedale and Leyburn Railway
- Pre-grouping: North Eastern Railway
- Post-grouping: London and North Eastern Railway

Key dates
- 19 May 1856: Opened
- 1 March 1917: Closed
- 24 October 1921: Reopened
- 26 April 1954: Closed
Location

Crakehall railway station was a railway station that served the village of Crakehall, North Yorkshire, England.

== History ==
Opened by the Bedale and Leyburn Railway, it became part of the London and North Eastern Railway during the Grouping of 1923. The line then passed on to the North Eastern Region of British Railways on nationalisation in 1948. It was then closed by British Railways in April 1954.

== The site today ==
Track still passes through the station site, providing rail access for the Wensleydale Railway which operates west from Leeming Bar. The crossing is now manually operated by a crossing keeper when the heritage line is operating. The station building remains intact and is used as a private house.

Preceding station	Historical railways	Following station
Jervaulx; Line open, station closed	North Eastern Railway; Bedale and Leyburn Railway	Bedale; Line and station open
