= Listed buildings in Morton-on-Swale =

Morton-on-Swale is a civil parish in the county of North Yorkshire, England. It contains five listed buildings that are recorded in the National Heritage List for England. Of these, one is listed at Grade II*, the middle of the three grades, and the others are at Grade II, the lowest grade. The parish contains the village of Morton-on-Swale and the surrounding countryside, and the listed buildings consist of three farmhouses, a bridge and a former chapel.

== Key ==
Grade	Criteria
II*	Particularly important buildings of more than special interest
II	Buildings of national importance and special interest

== Buildings ==
Name and location	Photograph	Date	Notes	Grade
Morton Hall Farm; 54.32192°N 1.50739°W	—	16th century	Most of the farmhouse dates from the 18th century. The earlier part, in the left return and rear, is in stone, and the rest is in red brick, with stone quoins. The roof is in Welsh slate roof with stone coping. There are two storeys and three bays. In the centre is a porch and doorway, to its right is a small arched window, and the outer bays contain bay windows. On the upper floor are sash windows.	II
Manor House Farm; 54.32152°N 1.50819°W	—	Late 17th century	The farmhouse is in red brick, with a floor band, and a pantile roof with kneelers and brick coping. There are two storeys and four bays. On the front is a full-height gabled porch containing a doorway. The windows are a mix of casements and horizontally-sliding sashes.	II
Langlands; 54.31308°N 1.49598°W		Mid to late 18th century	A farmhouse in rendered brick, with an eaves band, and a machine tile roof with stone coping and shaped kneelers. There are two storeys, four bays, and a single-bay extension to the left. On the front is a doorway with pilasters, Ionic capitals, a fanlight, a frieze and a dentilled cornice. The windows are a mix of sashes and casements, and at the rear is an arched stair window.	II*
Morton Bridge; 54.32072°N 1.51153°W		1800–03	The bridge, designed by John Carr, carries the A684 road over the River Swale. It is in stone, and consists of four segmental arches with voussoirs and hood moulds. There are three polygonal rusticated cutwaters rising to canted pedestrian refuges. The bridge has a band and a parapet, flanking the end arches are pilasters, and at the ends are round piers with hemispherical caps.	II
Wesleyan Chapel; 54.32316°N 1.49694°W	—	1815	The chapel, later the village hall, is in red brick, and has a hipped Welsh slate roof with cast iron cresting and finials. There are two storeys and three bays, the central bay with a recessed arch, and the windows have round-arched heads. The ground floor window in the centre has a stuccoed rusticated surround and a dated double keystone, and above it is a stone panel.	II
