= Morton Bridge =

Bridge in North Yorkshire, England

Coordinates: 54.3207°N 1.5114°W

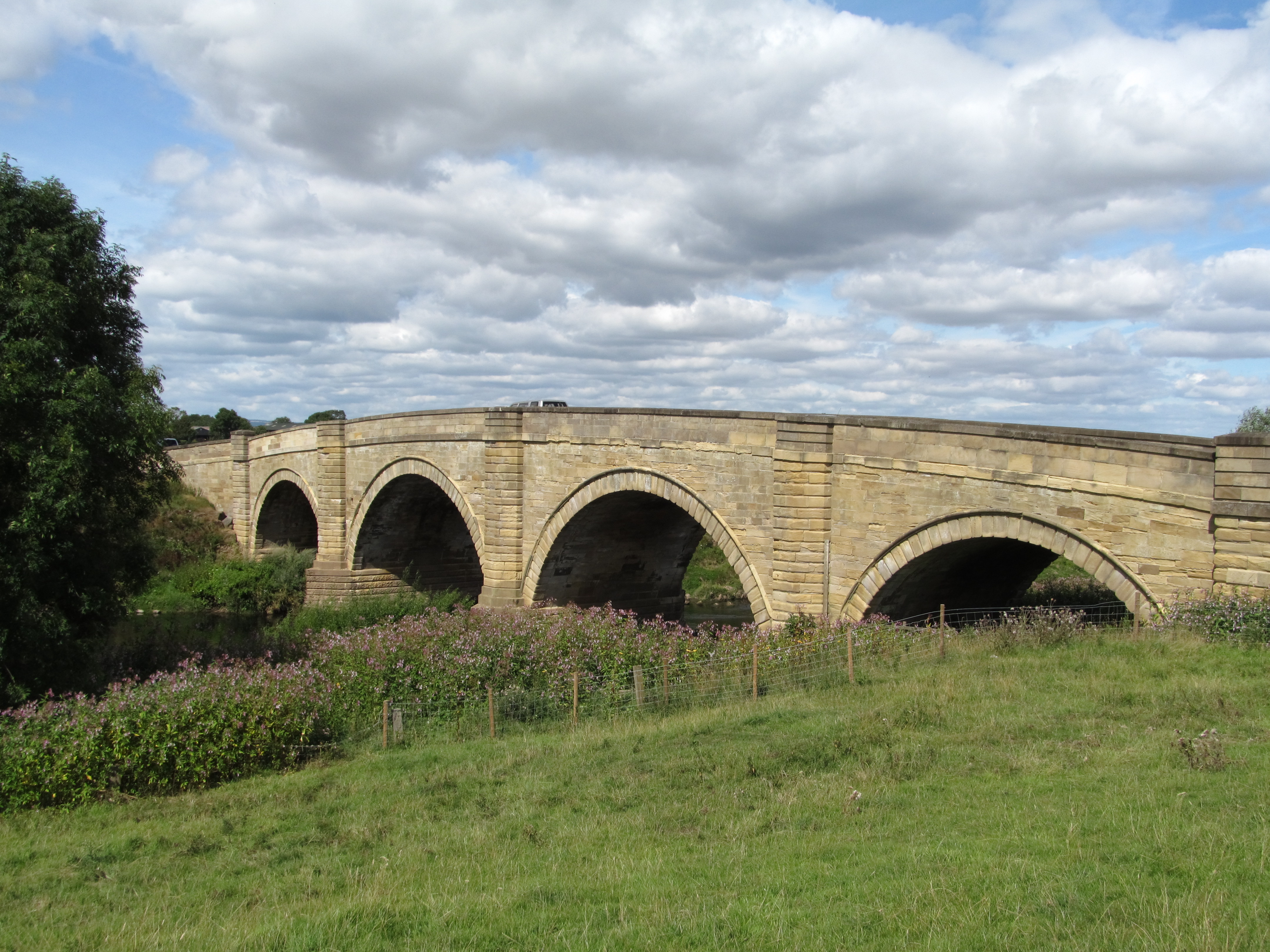
The bridge, in 2023

Morton Bridge is a historic structure connecting Morton-on-Swale and Scruton, two villages in North Yorkshire, in England.

A ferry across the River Swale at the location was first recorded in 1317. By the 16th century, John Leland recorded a wooden bridge in the village. The current bridge was constructed between 1800 and 1803, by John Carr, at a cost of £8,240 10s. It was grade II listed in 1986. Brian Wragg and Giles Worsley describe it as "a very architectural conception" with "ashlar and rustication in profusion". It carries what is now the A684 road.

The bridge is built of stone, and consists of four segmental arches with voussoirs and hood moulds. There are three polygonal rusticated cutwaters rising to canted pedestrian refuges. The bridge has a band and a parapet, flanking the end arches are pilasters, and at the ends are round piers with hemispherical caps.

== See also ==
- Listed buildings in Morton-on-Swale
- List of crossings of the River Swale
