= Listed buildings in Warlaby =

Warlaby is a civil parish in the county of North Yorkshire, England. It contains three listed buildings that are recorded in the National Heritage List for England. All the listed buildings are designated at Grade II, the lowest of the three grades, which is applied to "buildings of national importance and special interest". The parish contains the village of Warlaby and the surrounding countryside, and the listed buildings consist of a house and two farmhouses.

== Buildings ==
Name and location	Photograph	Date	Notes
Warlaby Nook Farm; 54.30782°N 1.45854°W		Early to mid-18th century	The farmhouse is in red brick, with a double floor band, stepped eaves, and a pantile roof with stone coping. There are two storeys and five bays. Steps lead up to the central doorway that has a flat brick arch, and the windows are sashes with flat brick arches.
Low Sober Farm; 54.30492°N 1.47562°W	—	Late 18th to early 19th century	The farmhouse is in red brick, with dentilled eaves, and a pantile roof with stone coping and shaped kneelers. There are two storeys and three bays, and a lower wing at right angles on the left. On the front is a double door, above which is a dated wooden sundial, and the windows are sashes with stuccoed flat arches and incised voussoirs.
Warlaby Lodge; 54.31731°N 1.46333°W	—	Early to mid-19th century	The house is in brick on a stone plinth, with stone dressings, a floor band, and a hipped Welsh slate roof. There are two storeys and three bays. In the centre is a doorway with Doric pilasters, a fanlight, a frieze and a cornice, in front of which is a later brick and glass porch. The windows are sashes with flat brick arches.
