= Wensley railway station =

Disused railway station in North Yorkshire, England

Wensley
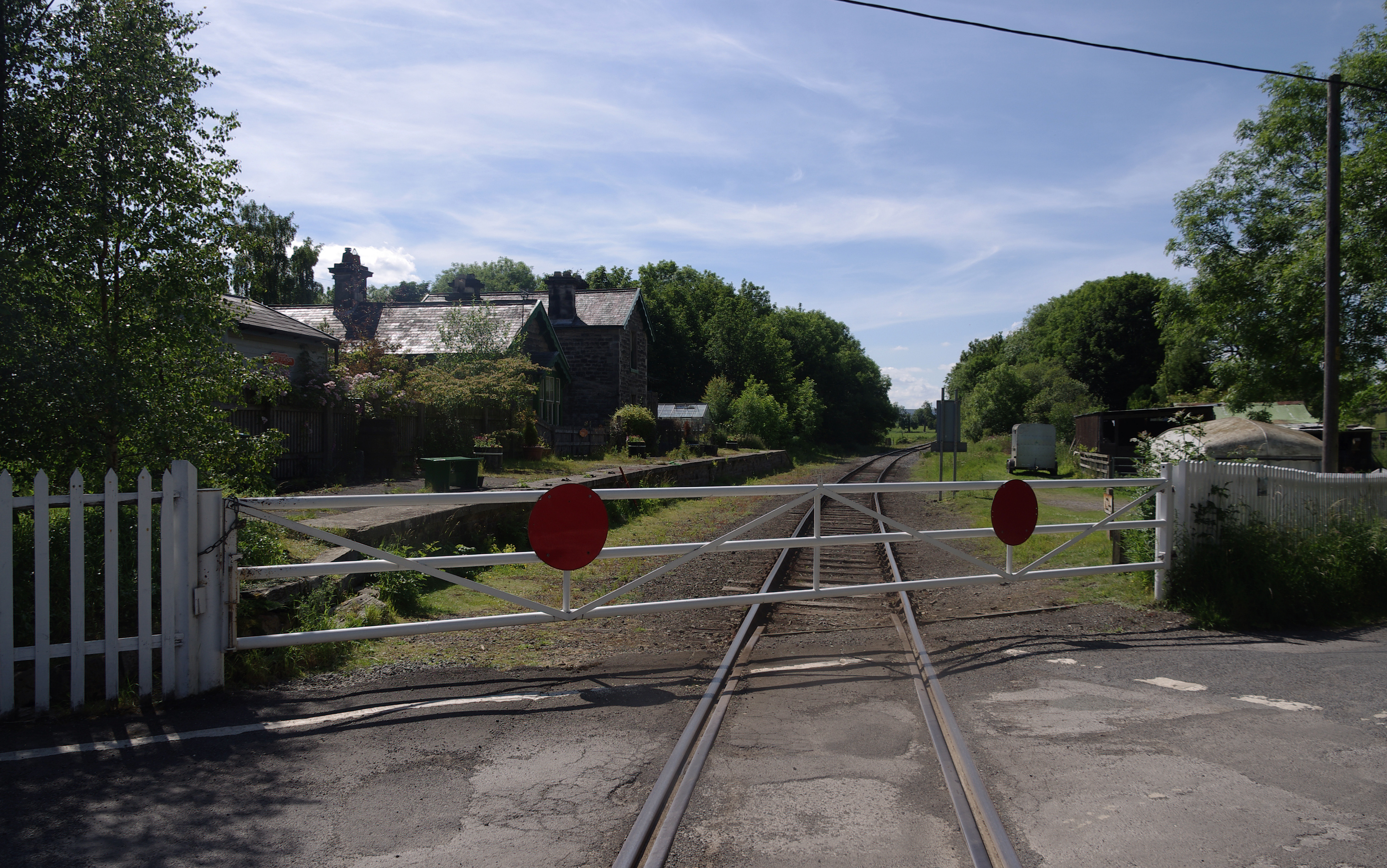

General information
- Location: Wensley, North Yorkshire; England
- Coordinates: 54.310777°N 1.879074°W
- Grid reference: SE079905
- Platforms: 2

Other information
- Status: Disused

History
- Original company: North Eastern Railway
- Post-grouping: London and North Eastern Railway

Key dates
- 1 February 1877: Opened
- 26 April 1954: Closed
Location

Wensley railway station is a disused railway station on the Wensleydale Railway, in North Yorkshire, England.

It was opened by the North Eastern Railway on 1 February 1877, and served the village of Wensley.

The station was host to camping coach from 1936 to 1939 and may have had a coach visiting in 1934 and 1935.

The station closed on 26 April 1954. The station buildings and platforms survive as a private residence. The railway through the station was reopened as the Wensleydale Railway.

Preceding station	Historical railways	Following station
Redmire; Line and station open	North Eastern Railway; Hawes Branch	Leyburn; Line and station open
