= Constable Burton railway station =

Disused railway station in North Yorkshire, England

Constable Burton
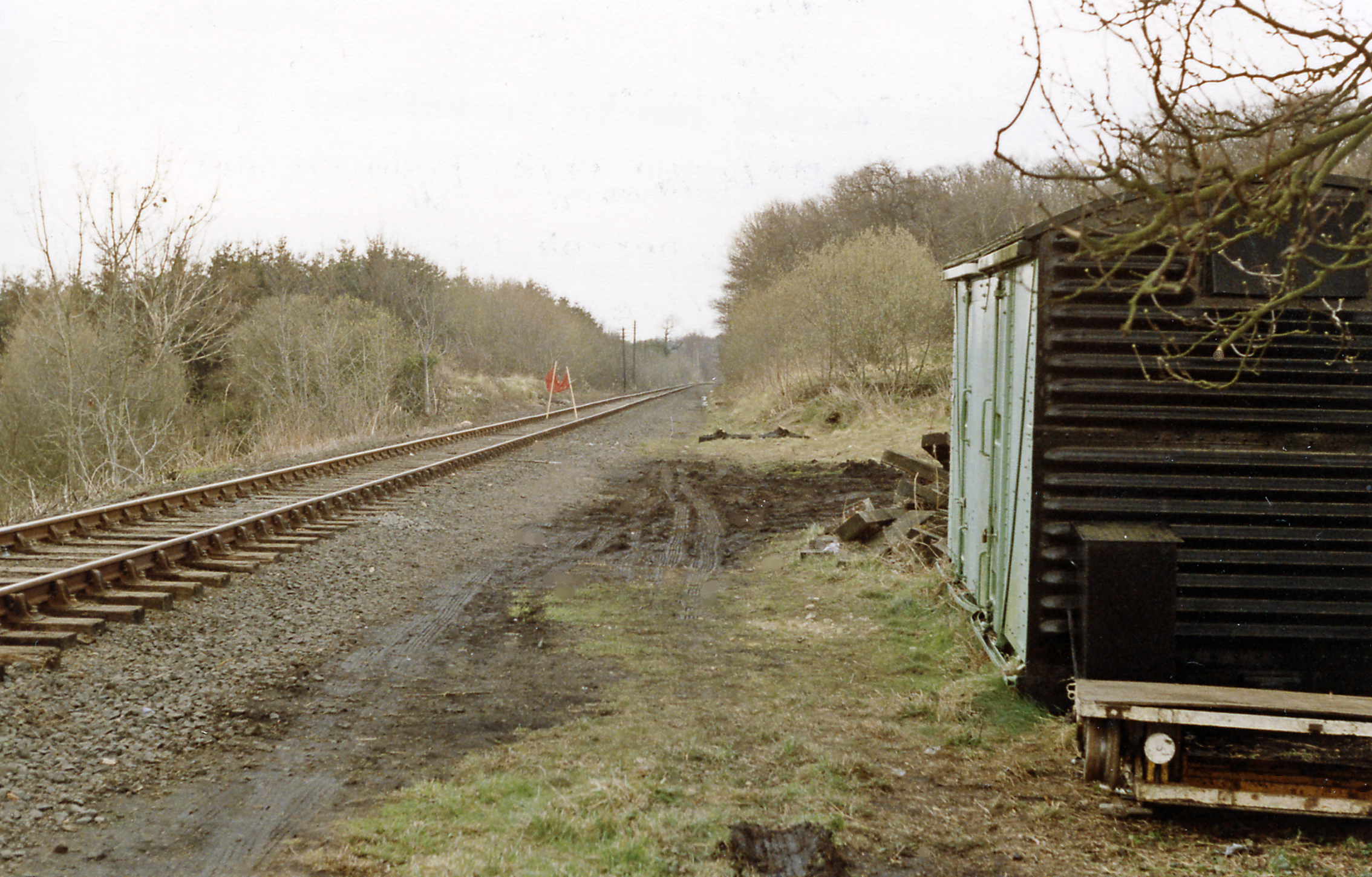
- Site of the station in March 1989

General information
- Location: Constable Burton, North Yorkshire; England
- Coordinates: 54.306554°N 1.745544°W
- Grid reference: SE166901

Other information
- Status: Disused

History
- Original company: Bedale and Leyburn Railway
- Pre-grouping: North Eastern Railway
- Post-grouping: London and North Eastern Railway

Key dates
- 19 May 1856: Opened
- 26 April 1954: Closed to passengers
- 14 October 1957: Closed to freight traffic
Location

Constable Burton railway station is a disused railway station on the Wensleydale Railway, in North Yorkshire, England. It was built to serve Constable Burton Hall, the village and the farms in this rural area.

== History ==
It was opened by the Bedale and Leyburn Railway on 19 May 1856, and served the village of Constable Burton. The station closed to passengers on 26 April 1954. The North Eastern Railway operated the Northallerton to Hawes and Garsdale railway station on the Settle & Carlisle line until the Midland Railway operated it prior to grouping in 1923, subsequently it was part of the London, Midland and Scottish Railway until nationalisation in 1948. The station was closed to freight on 14 October 1957 but stone traffic continued using the line until 1992. The line as far as Redmire was occasionally used for conveying Army tanks etc. for Catterick Garrison and is now operated as the Wensleydale Railway which is a heritage line.

== Infrastructure ==
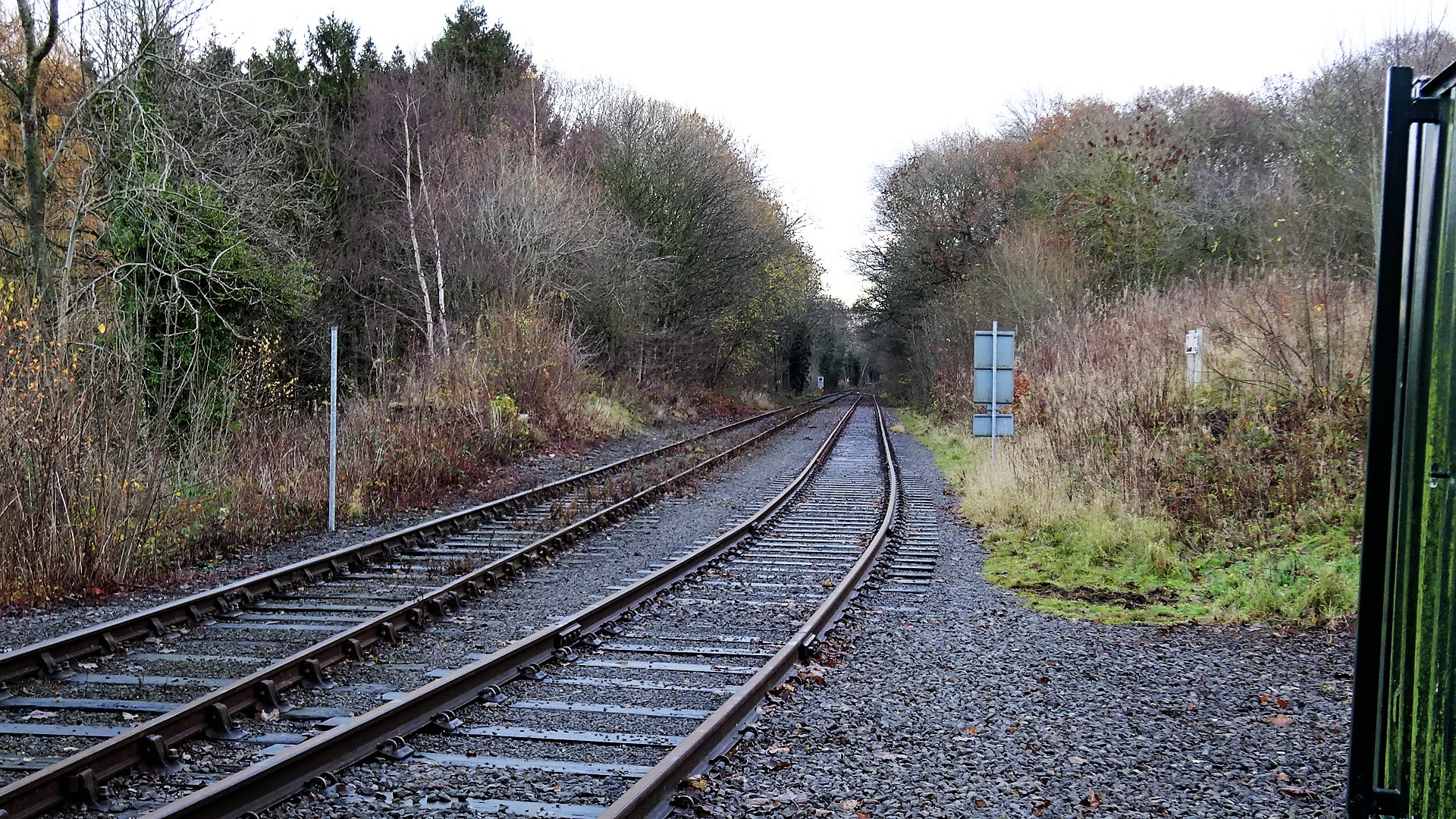
The passing loop and station site on the left.

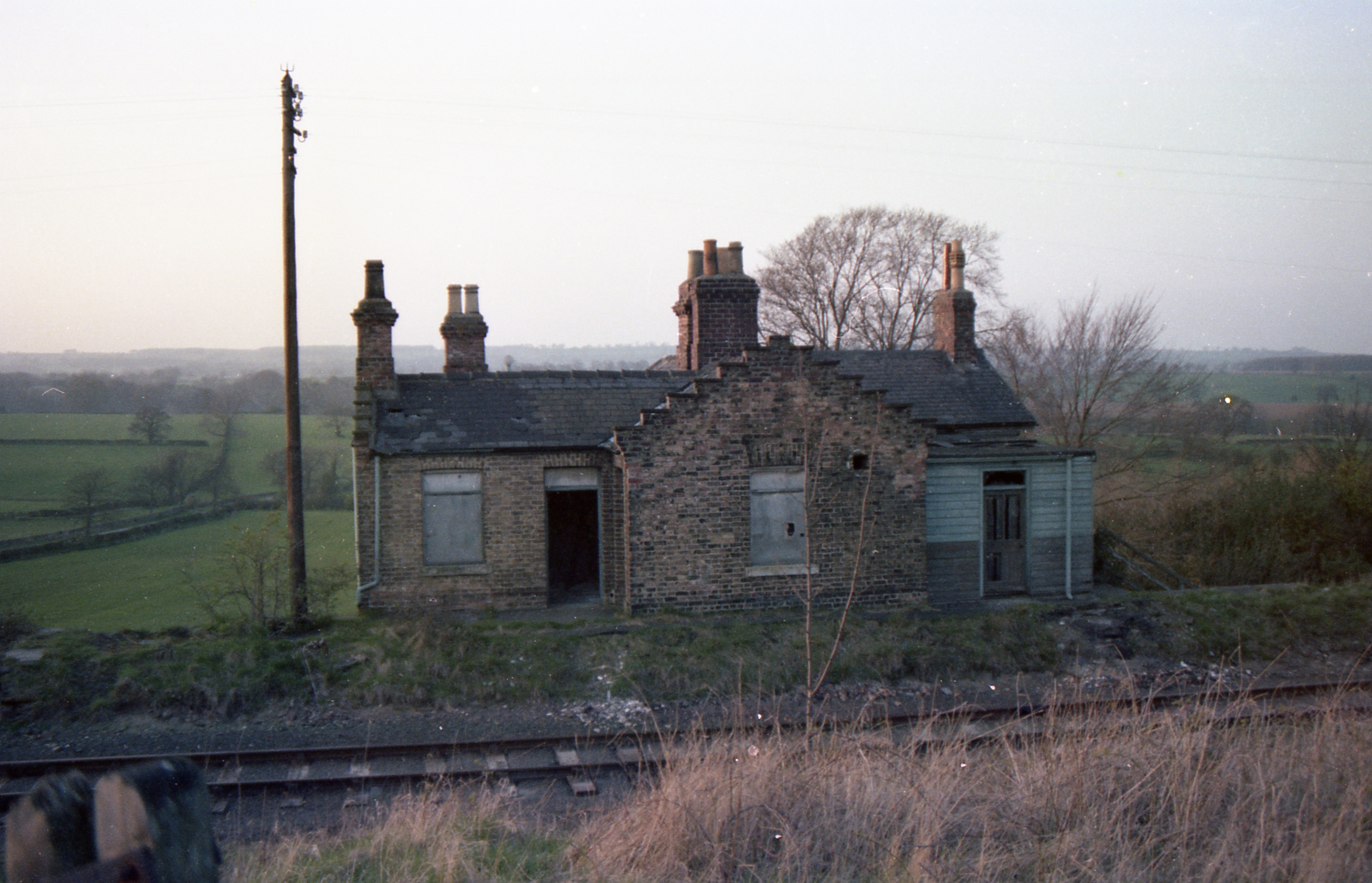
Constable Burton railway station before demolition in approx. 1980

The OS map of 1856 shows only a short platform and a small building with a signal post on the opposite side of the lane to the later station. By 1893 the OS map shows a station on the same northern side of the line but approached by a lane running off the lane and going to the east. A weighing machine is shown near the junction with the lane, several buildings and two signals. On the southern side are two fairly lengthy sidings, a loading dock and a small building set at the back of a sizeable goods yard that is accessed of the lane at the present day entry point.

== The site today ==
No signs of the passenger station survive however the loading dock survives and a railway access point leads to a yard with a small permanent way maintenance building and a passing loop is present, partly built on the site of the old goods sidings by the Wensleydale Railway in 2010 to allow two train operations on the line as required.

The former Great Eastern Railway signal box at Hertford East has been donated by Network Rail to the railway so that they can install it to control the signals and points in Constable Burton Loop. As the box has a grade II listed status, Network Rail have applied for special licence to dismantle and remove the box. Network Rail will cover dismantling, transportation and rebuilding costs helped by a grant from the Railway Heritage Trust. The Wensleydale Railway aims to have the box operational by 2021.

Preceding station	Historical railways	Following station
Spennithorne; Line open, station closed	North Eastern Railway; Bedale and Leyburn Railway	Finghall; Line and station open
