= David Ince =

Royal Air Force pilot

David Henry Gason Ince DFC
- Born: 23 March 1921; Glasgow, Scotland
- Died: 2 August 2017 (aged 96) Winchester, England
- Allegiance: United Kingdom
- Branch: Army; Royal Air Force
- Conflicts: Second World War

David Henry Gason Ince DFC (23 March 1921 – 2 August 2017) was a Royal Air Force pilot of the Second World War in Hawker Typhoons who flew nearly 150 sorties and was awarded the Distinguished Flying Cross. He flew the only raid in Europe to use napalm, near Arnhem in April 1945.

He was an experienced glider pilot and in 1958 he flew an Olympia 419 glider from Lavenham, Suffolk, to Land's End, a distance of 315 miles and a UK glider distance record at that time.

== Early life ==
Ince was born on 23 March 1921 in Glasgow to Douglas Ince, who was the director of an armaments firm which supplied Explosives for civil engineering, and his mother Isobel. He was educated at Kelvinside Academy, Aysgarth School and Cheltenham College.

== Military career ==
=== Enlistment and training ===
Ince first experienced flying when he was taken up over the River Clyde by a member of the Renfrew Flying Club in a Gypsy Moth. After school he applied to join the Royal Air Force but failed the eye test. However, he was able to join No. 602 Auxiliary Squadron and found that 18 months' commissioned service with the Royal Artillery he could be seconded to the air force. He found a shop that could make up sun-glasses to his prescription with frames that looked like the standard service issue, and so he solved the problem of flying in spectacles, successfully passed the eye test for the secondment and went to Canada for his flight training.

=== Second World War ===
During the Allied Invasion of Europe, Ince's reconnaissance aircraft was hit while he photographed the Gestapo Headquarters at Rotterdam in the Netherlands. In this period he also assisted in the destruction of a bridge that collapsed into the river in one piece. Ince also claimed one-eleventh of a kill in the shooting down of a Blohm and Voss Flying boat.

==== Napalm ====
Ince participated in what is thought to be the only operational use of napalm in the European campaign. On 12 April 1945, napalm was used against a German strongpoint near Arnhem in the Netherlands. The eight-foot canister of napalm missed the target but is believed to have damaged the morale of the German troops. Of the attack, Ince noted, "The fiery mass sprayed forward and upwards, in a cascade of incandescent reds and yellows which threatened to engulf my tail."

=== Typhoon ===
Ince was enthusiastic to fly the Hawker Typhoon and told a wing-commander who was recruiting pilots to fly them that a shortened right index finger made flying British aircraft easier than American models. This was due to British aircraft employing a spade grip control stick with thumb activated firing button while American aircraft required the pilot to pull levers and press to fire with a finger. The wing commander readily accepted, with an attrition rate of one in three (150 of the 450 Typhoon pilots would be lost by the war's end) he was wondering how to persuade pilots to volunteer.

The shortened index finger, which he dubbed 'Stumpy', was the result of placing it in the Spokes of a bicycle to see what would happen at the age of around seven.

Flying with 193 Squadron and 257 Squadron, Ince flew almost 150 Sorties. When flying reconnaissance he modified the front gun mouldings to take an F24 camera, an exercise which yielded unprecedented close up images.

In the closing stages of the war in 1945 as acting Squadron Leader, he was leading No. 193 Squadron on shipping strikes in the Baltic. He was one of the pilots ordered to sink a group of four ships near Lubeck, including the Cap Arcona, unaware that they were laden with 10,000 prisoners from concentration camps. When David was interviewed in 2000, he said: "If you are in war, then these things happen. You try yourself to stop them happening. But it is the penalty of going to war, part of the downside, and part of the evil. Try as you will, you cannot stop it." He was assessed as exceptional as a fighter-bomber pilot when his squadron was disbanded in August 1945.

== Post-war ==
=== Empire Test Pilots' School and gliding ===
After the war Ince joined the Empire Test Pilots' School. However, chronic sinusitis prevented his working with high altitude jet aircraft. Ince then turned his attention to gliding He was soon the Chief Flying Instructor of the Midland Gliding Club. He became a regular member of the squad for the British Gliding Team between 1952 and 1960 and flew in the National Championships over 27 years. He became National Aerobatic Champion in 1958 and did many displays including one at the Farnborough Air Show. He helped develop and test the gliders produced by Elliotts of Newbury from 1949 to 1968. He broke several UK records and was the first to fly over 500km in a straight line in the UK (from Lavenham in Suffolk to Land's End in Cornwall. He was a council member of the British Gliding Association for 21 years.

=== Civilian work ===
Ince worked as an aviation expert for Elliotts, a company specialising in flight systems used in the Lightning, Buccaneer, Blue Steel, BAC 1-11 and subsequently Concorde.

He became managing director of Bryans Ltd transforming it into a specialist scientific instrument maker, and finally for eleven years he was a director of the Gascoigne Group, marketing livestock equipment internationally.

=== Author ===
Ince penned two books, Combat and Competition in 1992 and Brotherhood of the Skies in 2010.

== Personal life ==
He married Joanne "Anne" Burton, a PR and advertising executive in 1954 with whom he had two daughters. Ince enjoyed fly-fishing for trout and painting. He was in demand as an after-dinner speaker. He bought a farm near Old Basing in Hampshire where his wife and daughters, all keen equestrians, could train their horses. After his wife died in 1993, he became a lay pastor.

David died on 2 August 2017 at Winchester in Hampshire. He was survived by his two daughters.

== Publications ==
- Combat and competition. Newton Publishers, 1992. ISBN 1872308325
- Brotherhood of the skies: Wartime experiences of a gunnery officer and Typhoon pilot. Grub Street, 2010. ISBN 978-1906502645
