= Listed buildings in Newton-le-Willows, North Yorkshire =

Newton-le-Willows is a civil parish in the county of North Yorkshire, England. It contains three listed buildings that are recorded in the National Heritage List for England. All the listed buildings are designated at Grade II, the lowest of the three grades, which is applied to "buildings of national importance and special interest". The parish contains the village of Newton-le-Willows and the surrounding area, and the listed buildings consist of a bridge, a house and a school chapel.

== Buildings ==
Name and location	Photograph	Date	Notes
Newton Bridge; 54.30508°N 1.67132°W		Late 18th to early 19th century	The bridge carries Brompton Road over Burton Beck. It is in sandstone, and consists of a single segmental arch, with tapering abutments, and pilasters at the ends. The bridge has a band, and parapets with saddleback coping.
The Hall; 54.30167°N 1.67192°W	—	Early to mid-19th century	The house is roughcast, with sandstone dressings and Westmorland slate roofs, and has two storeys. The south front has two bays and a stone plinth, quoin strips, a moulded cornice, a parapet and a hipped roof. To the left is a doorway with Roman Doric engaged columns, an architrave, a fanlight, a frieze and a cornice. To the right is a single-storey bay window, and the upper floor contains sash windows. At the rear is a lower service range.
Chapel, Aysgarth School; 54.29647°N 1.68075°W	—	1890	The school chapel is in red brick with stone dressings and a tile roof, and consists of a two-bay nave and a one-bay chancel in one unit. At the northwest is an octagonal stair tower with a recessed spire and a knob finial. The windows are in Perpendicular style, the east window with five lights under a basket arch. The stained glass and interior decoration is by Henry Holiday, and the woodwork is by Robert Thompson.
