= Northallerton West railway station =

Railway station in North Yorkshire, England

Northallerton West
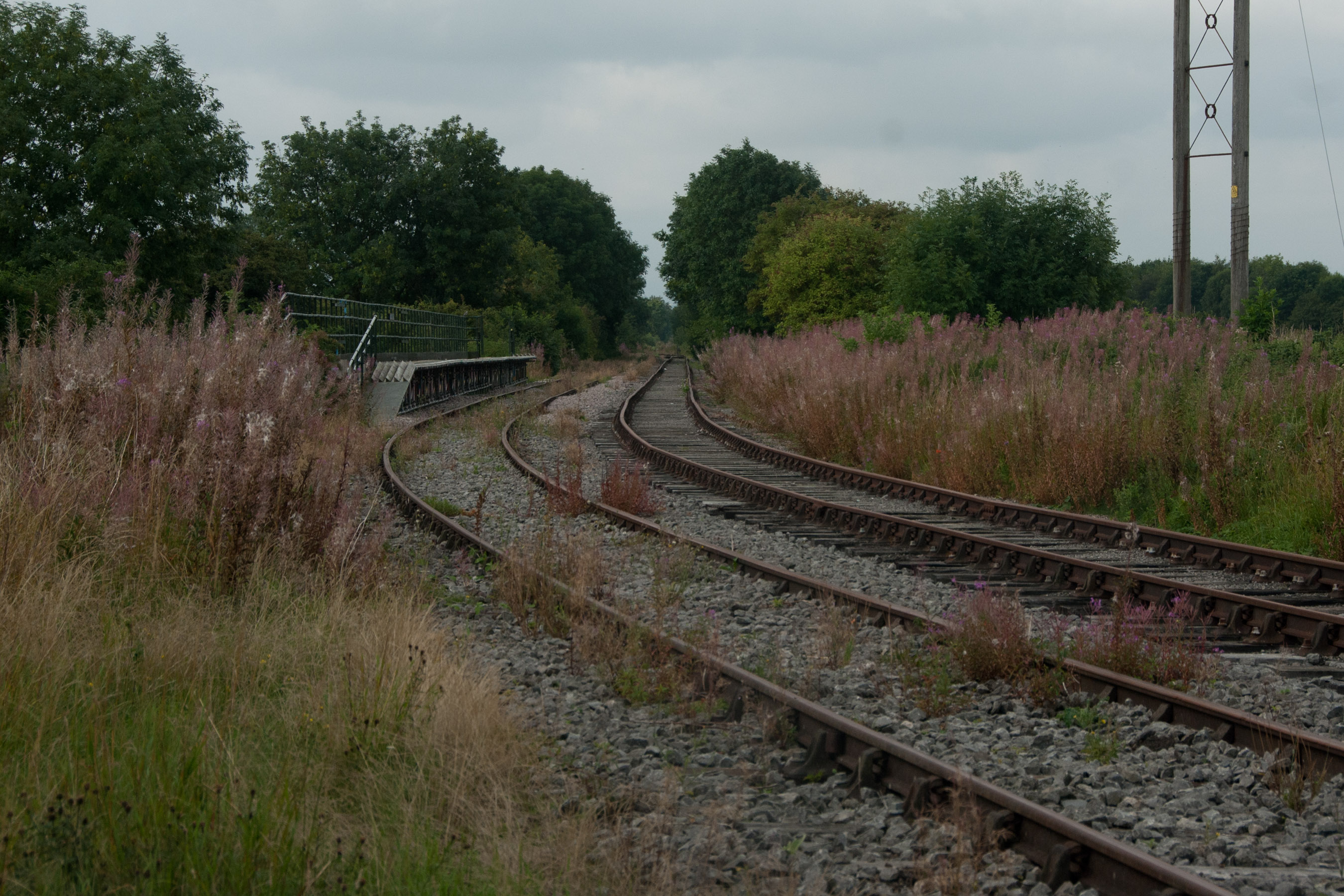
- Northallerton West railway station on the loop at the eastern end of the Wensleydale Railway in August 2018.

General information
- Location: Northallerton, North Yorkshire; England
- Coordinates: 54.3400°N 1.4482°W
- Grid reference: SE359939
- System: Station on heritage railway
- Operator: Wensleydale Railway
- Platforms: 1

History
- Opened: 22 November 2014
- Closed: August 2016
Location

Northallerton West is a temporary station built by the Wensleydale Railway as part of plans to link the railway with Northallerton, North Yorkshire, England.

== History ==
In May 2014, Hambleton District Council agreed to provide £40,000 towards the estimated £51,000 cost of providing a temporary platform on land on the south-east side of Springwell Lane, Castle Hills, Northallerton, to establish a link between the Wensleydale Railway and the North Yorkshire town. A sum of £28,000 had already been spent by the heritage railway on upgrading the track from Leeming Bar.

Work started on the station's construction in October 2014, with the official opening taking place on 22 November 2014. The date also coincided with the restart of services from Scruton. The first train to arrive at the new station was a four-coach service hauled by Harry Needle Railroad Company's 47715 in Fragonset livery.

The station, along with that at Scruton, was closed in August 2016 following a collision between a train and a car at a level crossing near Yafforth. It is hoped to re-open the line and station at a future date once work to upgrade the level crossing equipment is complete, although there are no current plans as the railway focuses on the core section from Scruton to Leyburn.

Preceding station	Heritage railways	Following station
Scruton towards Leyburn	Wensleydale Railway Service suspended	Terminus

== Future ==
The aim of the Wensleydale Railway in the long-term is to extend the line to Northallerton station and allow passengers to interchange with National Rail services. As this will require an agreement with Network Rail, the provision of the platform is an interim solution which will allow the track to be brought into more regular use whilst also bringing in extra income for the heritage railway.

== See also ==
- Railways in Northallerton
