= Scruton railway station =

Railway station in North Yorkshire, England

Scruton
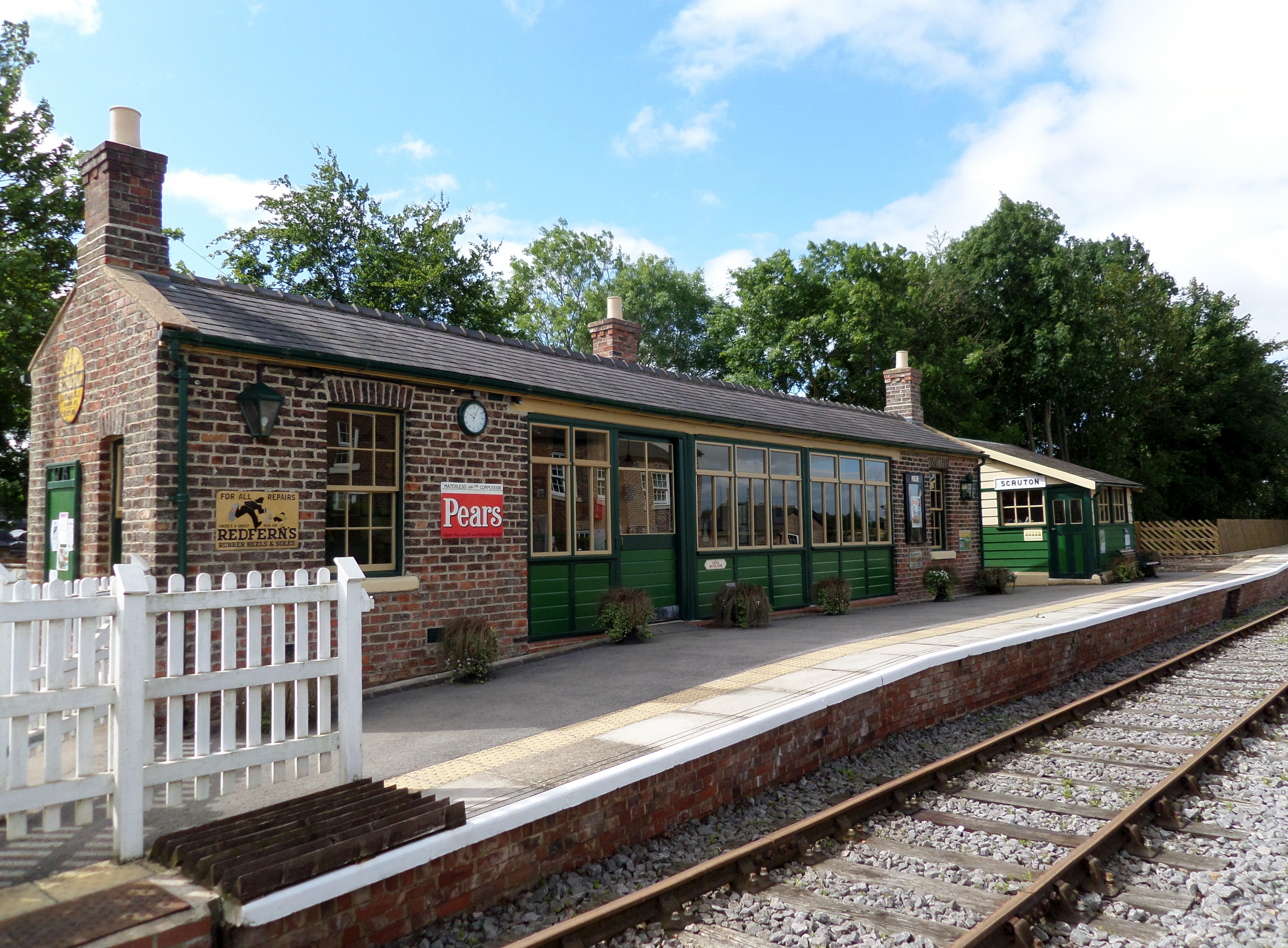
- Scruton railway station in 2017

General information
- Location: Scruton, North Yorkshire; England
- Coordinates: 54.319604°N 1.533628°W
- Grid reference: SE304916
- System: Station on heritage railway
- Operator: Wensleydale Railway
- Platforms: 1

History
- Original company: York, Newcastle and Berwick Railway
- Pre-grouping: North Eastern Railway
- Post-grouping: London and North Eastern Railway

Key dates
- 6 March 1848: Opened as Scruton Lane
- Unknown: Renamed Scruton
- 26 April 1954: Closed to passengers
- 7 May 1956: Closed to goods
- 26 April 2014: Reopened
Location

Scruton railway station is a restored railway station on the Wensleydale Railway that serves the village of Scruton, in North Yorkshire, England.

== History ==
Opened by the York, Newcastle and Berwick Railway on 6 March 1848 as "Scruton Lane", it was renamed "Scruton" not long afterwards. The station became part of the London and North Eastern Railway upon the railway grouping of 1923 before being taken over by British Railways on nationalisation in 1948. It was closed to passenger traffic by British Railways on 26 April 1954, with goods traffic continuing until 7 May 1956.

== Present day ==
Despite the station's closure, the line remained open for limestone traffic until 1992 after which it was taken over by the Wensleydale Railway which obtained a lease of the 22 miles (35 km) from Northallerton to Redmire.

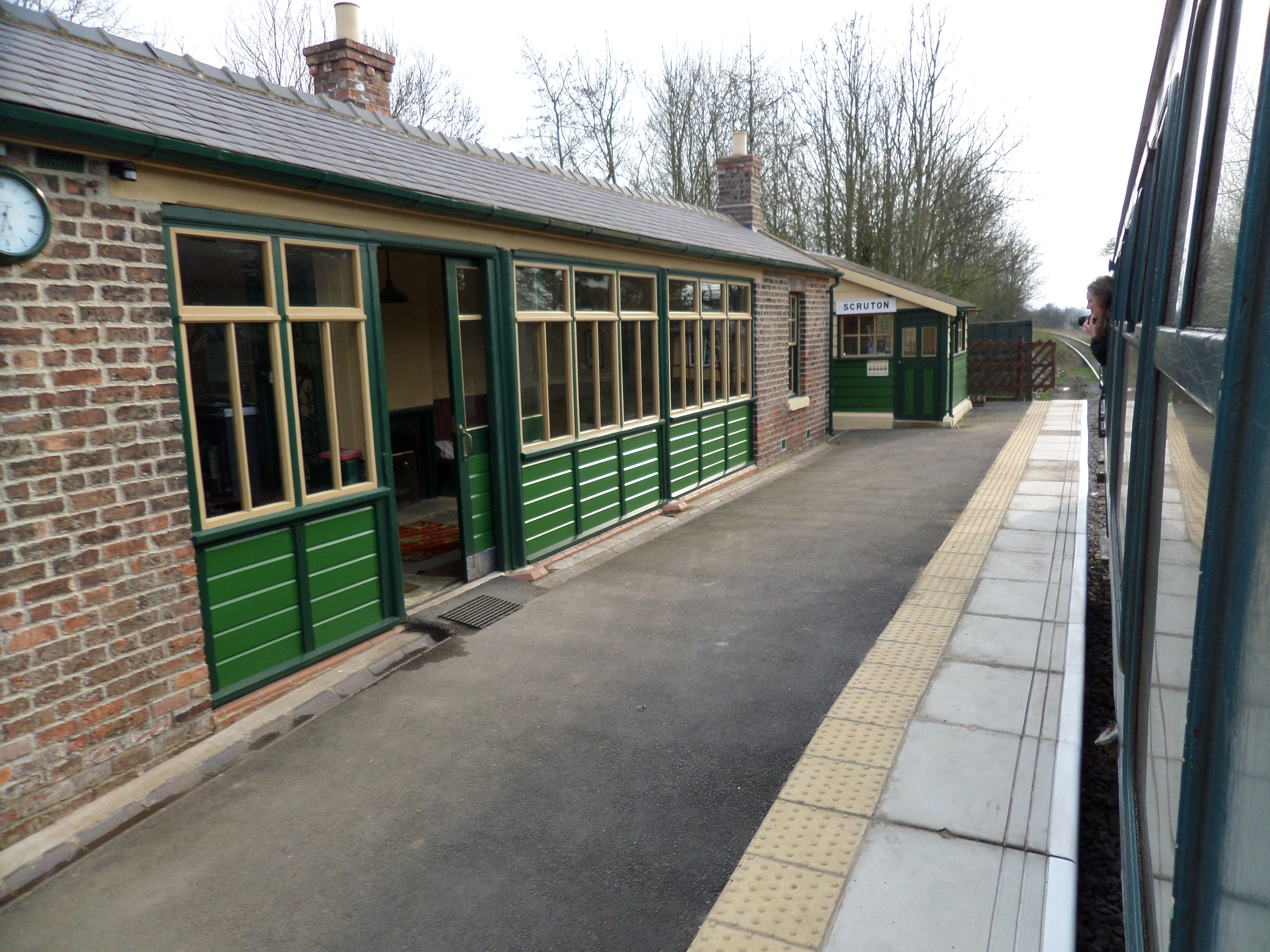
Scruton railway station in 2015

By the time the Wensleydale Railway opened in 2003, Scruton station was a dilapidated and overgrown state. Restoration works were undertaken with the support of Scruton Parish Council and a grant from the Railway Heritage Trust. After completion of the restoration of the structure of the buildings and re-roofing, the Wensleydale Railway signed a sublease with Scruton Parish Council on 27 April 2011 which passed the responsibility for maintaining and restoring the building to the Wensleydale Railway Trust.

On 26 April 2014, Scruton station reopened to coincide with the 60th anniversary of the line's closure to passenger services. A special reopening service was run with Leyland railbus LEV1. By November 2014, although restoration of the building was virtually complete a short length of platform was required for construction to bring it into compliance with modern regulations which require platforms to be at least 60 metres (200 ft). The station did not operate until the Wensleydale's eastern terminus at Northallerton West was completed and opened to the public on 22 November 2014.

The station, along with that at Northallerton West, was closed in August 2016 following a collision between a train and a car at a level crossing near Yafforth. Scruton station has since reopened and is currently the eastern terminus of the Wensleydale Railway. The station is only served on select operating days and is home to the railway's "Living History Experience".

== Sources ==
- Butt, R. V. J. (October 1995). The Directory of Railway Stations: details every public and private passenger station, halt, platform and stopping place, past and present (1st ed.). Sparkford: Patrick Stephens Ltd. ISBN 978-1-85260-508-7. OCLC 60251199. OL 11956311M.
- Clinker, C. R. (1988) [1978]. Clinker's Register of Closed Passenger Stations and Goods Depots in England, Scotland and Wales 1830–1980 (2nd ed.). Bristol: Avon-Anglia Publications & Services. ISBN 978-0-905466-91-0. OCLC 655703233.
- Quick, Michael (2009) [2001]. Railway passenger stations in Great Britain: a chronology (4th ed.). Oxford: Railway & Canal Historical Society. ISBN 978-0-901461-57-5. OCLC 612226077.

| Preceding station | Heritage railways | Following station |
|---|---|---|
| Leeming Bar Terminus | Wensleydale Railway Shuttle service | Terminus |
| Leeming Bar towards Leyburn | Wensleydale Railway Service suspended | Northallerton West Terminus |
Proposed extension
| Leeming Bar towards Leyburn | Wensleydale Railway | Ainderby towards Northallerton |
Historical railways
| Leeming Bar; Line and station open | North Eastern Railway; York, Newcastle and Berwick Railway | Ainderby; Line and station closed |
