= Warlaby =

Village and civil parish in North Yorkshire, England

Coordinates: 54.31771°N 1.46451°W

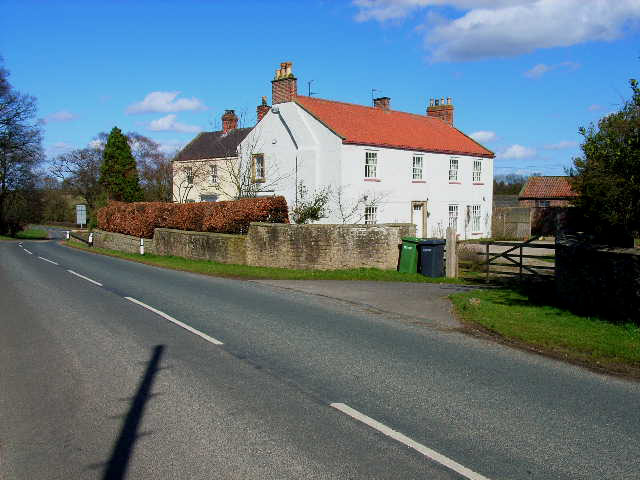
- Warlaby

- Location within North Yorkshire
- Population: 50 (2015)
- OS grid reference: SE349914
- Unitary authority: North Yorkshire
- Ceremonial county: North Yorkshire
- Region: Yorkshire and the Humber
- Country: England
- Sovereign state: United Kingdom
- Post town: NORTHALLERTON
- Postcode district: DL7
- Police: North Yorkshire
- Fire: North Yorkshire
- Ambulance: Yorkshire

Warlaby is a small village and civil parish in the county of North Yorkshire, England. The population of the civil parish taken at the 2011 Census was less than 100. Details are included in the civil parish of Ainderby Steeple. In 2015, North Yorkshire County Council estimated the population to be around 50 people. It is south of the A684 road and Morton-on-Swale. It is 1.6 miles (2.5 km) west of Northallerton.

From 1974 to 2023, Warlaby was part of the Hambleton District district, it is now administered by the unitary North Yorkshire Council.

The village is mentioned in the Domesday Book as having 75 ploughlands. Its name derives from Old English and is believed to be from Wærlaf's By, a personal name.

== See also ==
- Listed buildings in Warlaby
