= Aysgarth School =

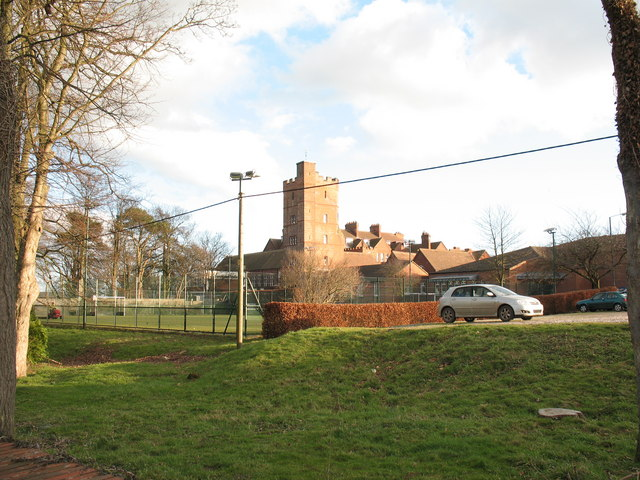

Location
- Newton-le-Willows; Bedale; North Yorkshire, DL8 1TF; England; 54.296281°N 1.681760°W

Information
- Type: Preparatory private day and boarding school
- Motto: Ex quercu non ex salice Latin: Of oak, not of willow
- Religious affiliation: Church of England
- Established: 1877
- Founder: Reverend Clement Hales
- Sister school: Rugby School
- School district: Richmondshire
- Department for Education URN: 121738 Tables
- Head teacher: Jonathon Anderson
- Gender: Co-educational
- Age: 3 to 13
- Enrolment: 230 (over 80% boarders)
- Capacity: 230
- Former pupils: Aysgarthians
- Admissions policy: Non Selective
- Website: www.aysgarthschool.com

Aysgarth School is a private co-educational day and boarding preparatory school in the village of Newton-le-Willows, North Yorkshire, England. As the name suggests, it was originally opened in the village of Aysgarth but was moved to Newton-le-Willows in 1890.

== History ==
The school was opened in 1877 by the Reverend Clement Hales to prepare boys for a secondary school education. In 1890, the school moved to newly built premises costing £20,000 in the village of Newton-le-Willows but retained the name of Aysgarth School. The chapel was a new building too, but contained items from elsewhere, such as the pulpit which was originally from Easby Abbey near Richmond. Whilst the chapel on site is a listed building, the rest of the buildings remain unlisted due to a significant fire on site in 1933 which destroyed much of the school.

The school is a preparatory school for selection to a range of private and independent schools across the United Kingdom and offers places to boys and girls between the ages of 3 and 13. Its independent status means that it is assessed by the Independent Schools Inspectorate for reporting purposes rather than Ofsted.

The school has been described as one of the leading prep schools for boys and girls. Its admissions policy is non-selective. The school is one of many who allow pets into the class and Aysgarth School encourages Housemasters to allow their dogs into class. The school's ethos is based on Christian values and principles, and as such, boarders are expected to attend services in the chapel on site for church services.

The school's motto is Ex quercu non ex salice (Latin for of oak, not of willow), and former pupils are known as Aysgarthians.

Aysgarth School joined the Rugby School Group on 1 July 2025.

Aysgarth will be celebrating its 150th anniversary in 2027.

== Notable Aysgarthians ==
- John Cracroft-Amcotts, former High Sheriff of Lincolnshire
- Sir (Henry) Grattan Bushe, Lawyer and colonial governor
- George Butterworth, Composer and folk-dancer
- Basil Guy, Victoria Cross recipient
- David Ince, RAF pilot who flew 150 missions over Germany during the Second World War and who was awarded the DFC
- James John Joicey, amateur entomologist who made significant contributions to the Natural History Museum's collection of Lepidoptera
- Richard Meinertzhagen, Soldier and ornithologist
- Matthew Pinsent, Olympic rower
- David Rogers, Anglican priest
- Jonathan Ruffer, Philanthropist
- Robert Swan, Polar explorer

== See also ==
- Listed buildings in Newton-le-Willows, North Yorkshire
