= Basil Guy (Royal Navy officer) =

- Born: 9 May 1882; Bishop Auckland, County Durham, England
- Died: 29 December 1956 (aged 74); Lambeth, London, England
- Burial place: St Michael's and All Angels Churchyard, Pirbright
- Military career
- Allegiance: United Kingdom
- Branch: Royal Navy
- Service years: 1898–1923
- Rank: Commander
- Units: HMS Barfleur
- Conflicts: Boxer Rebellion; First World War
- Awards: Victoria Cross; Distinguished Service Order

Commander Basil John Douglas Guy, VC, DSO (9 May 1882 – 29 December 1956) was a Royal Navy officer and recipient of the Victoria Cross, the highest award for gallantry in the face of the enemy that can be awarded to British and Commonwealth forces.

== Early life ==
Guy was born on 9 May 1882, the son of Sherwood Guy, the Vicar of Christ Church, High Harrogate. Guy was educated at Aysgarth School, followed by The Cathedral School, Llandaff, and finally the Britannia Royal Naval College at Dartmouth, Devon.

== Naval career ==
Guy was 18 years old, and a midshipman in the Royal Navy serving at HMS Barfleur during the Boxer Rebellion in China, when the following deed took place for which he was awarded the Victoria Cross:

On 13th July 1900, during the attack on Tientsin City, a very heavy cross-fire was brought to bear on the Naval Brigade, and there were several casualties. Among those who fell was an able seaman (name not quoted here), shot about 50 yards short of cover. Mr. Guy stopped with him, and, after seeing what the injury was, attempted to lift him up and carry him in, but was not strong enough, so after binding up the wound Mr. Guy ran to get assistance. In the meantime, the remainder of the company had passed in under cover, and the entire fire from the city wall was concentrated on Mr. Guy and the other man. Shortly after Mr. Guy had got in under cover the stretchers came up, and again Mr. Guy dashed out and assisted in placing the wounded man on the stretcher and carrying him in. The wounded man was however shot dead just as he was being carried into safety. During the whole time, a very heavy fire had been brought to bear upon Mr. Guy, and the ground around him was absolutely ploughed up.

Guy was invested with the Victoria Cross by King Edward VII on 8 March 1902, during a royal visit to Devonport Royal Dockyard.

After returning from China, he served on HMS Hannibal in the Channel Fleet. He was appointed action sub-lieutenant on 15 January 1902, and confirmed in this rank after a year. On 31 December 1902 was posted to the destroyer HMS Zephyr, serving in home waters.

== Further information ==
Guy later achieved the rank of commander, having fought in the First World War. He served as commander as the Q-ship Thornhill (which operated under a number of names, including Werribee, Wellhome and Wonganella) and clashed several times with enemy submarines. In June 1918, Guy was awarded the Distinguished Service Order for an engagement with a submarine in March 1917. His VC is on display at the Lord Ashcroft Gallery in the Imperial War Museum, London.

== Bibliography ==
- Chatterton, E. Keble (1922). Q-Ships and their Story. London: Sidgwick and Jackson, Ltd.
- Whitworth, Alan (2015). VCs of the North: Cumbria, Durham & Northumberland. Pen and Sword Books. ISBN 978-1473848221.
