= Wensleydale Railway =

Heritage railway in North Yorkshire, England

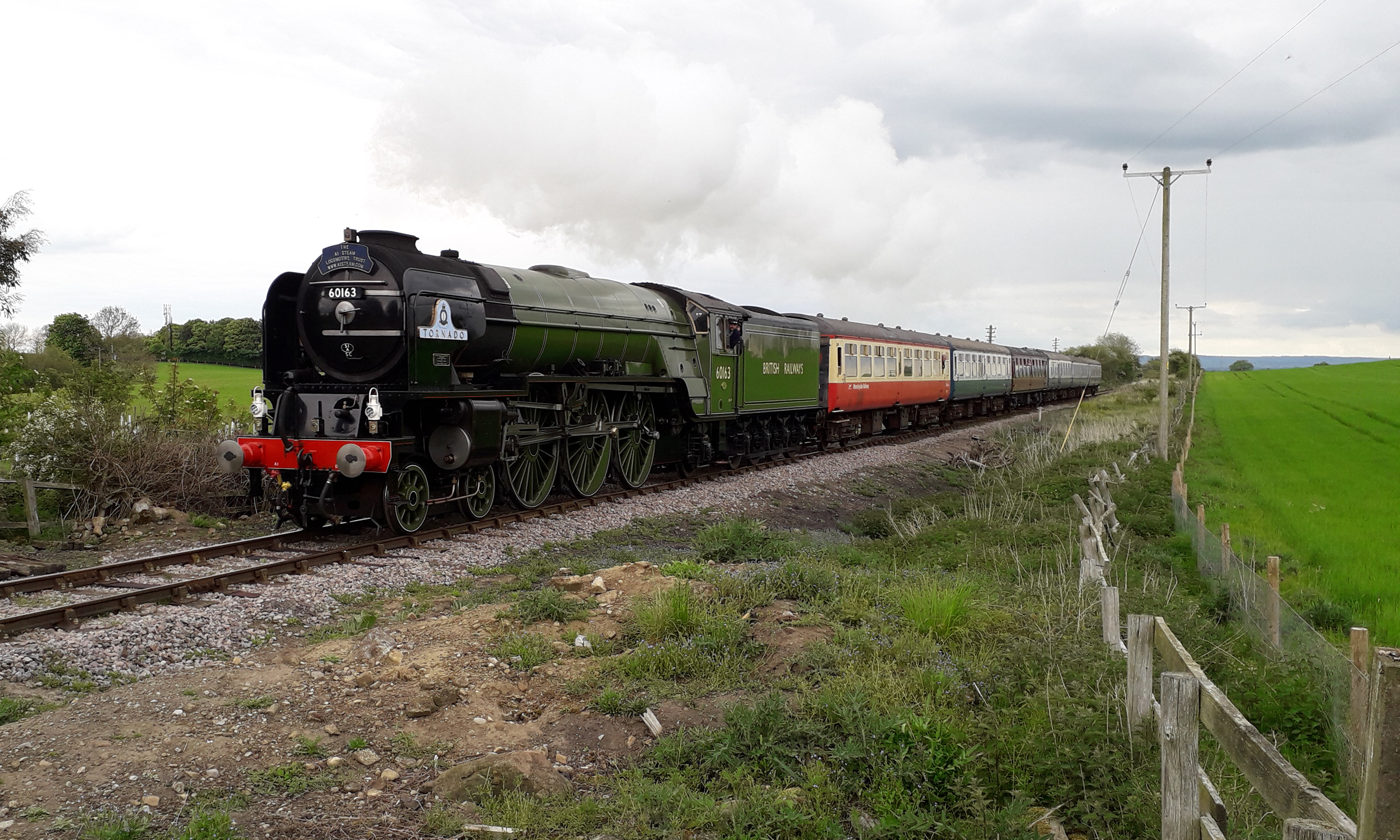
- Tornado at Newton-le-Willows in May 2019
- Locale: North Yorkshire

Commercial operations
- Name: Wensleydale Railway
- Original gauge: 4 ft 8 1/2 in (1,435 mm) standard gauge

Preserved operations
- Operated by: Wensleydale Railway plc
- Stations: 7
- Length: 22 miles (35 km)
- Preserved gauge: 4 ft 8 1/2 in (1,435 mm) standard gauge

Commercial history
- Opened: between 1848 & 1878
- Closed to passengers: 26 April 1954
- Closed: 1992

Preservation history
- Headquarters: Leeming Bar

The Wensleydale Railway is a heritage railway in Wensleydale and Lower Swaledale in North Yorkshire, England. It was built in stages by different railway companies and originally extended to Garsdale railway station on the Settle-Carlisle line. Since 2003, the remaining line has been run as a heritage railway. The line runs 22 miles (35 km) between Northallerton West station, about a fifteen-minute walk from Northallerton station on the East Coast Main Line, and Redmire.

Regular passenger services operate between Leeming Bar and Redmire, with a shuttle to Scruton, occasional freight services and excursions travel the full length of the line.

The line formerly ran from Northallerton to Garsdale on the Settle-Carlisle Railway but the track between Redmire and Garsdale has been lifted and several bridges have been demolished, although one of the stated aims of the Wensleydale Railway is to reinstate the line from Redmire to Garsdale. Additionally, a separate proposal exists to link Hawes to Garsdale with a view to providing commuter and tourist services rather than heritage services.

== History ==
On 26 June 1846, an act of Parliament, the Great North of England and Bedale Branch Railway Act 1846 (9 & 10 Vict. c. xcvi), authorised the Newcastle & Darlington Junction Railway, and its successor the York, Newcastle and Berwick Railway, to build a line between Northallerton and Bedale. The 5 1/2-mile (8.9 km) section between Northallerton and Leeming Lane opened on 6 March 1848. The section between Leeming Bar and Bedale that was authorised by the act was not built, due to the collapse of George Hudson's railway interests. This left the railway to terminate just west of the Great North Road in Leeming Bar, with passengers for Bedale being conveyed on the last section by horse and cart.

Bedale and Leyburn Railway Act 1853
- Act of Parliament
- Parliament of the United Kingdom
- Long title: An Act for making a Railway from Bedale to Leyburn in the North Riding of the County of York, to be called "The Bedale and Leyburn Railway," and for other Purposes, and of which the Short Title is "The Bedale and Leyburn Railway Act, 1853."
- Citation: 16 & 17 Vict. c. cxxxvii

Dates
- Royal assent: 4 August 1853

Text of statute as originally enacted

The Bedale and Leyburn Railway, financed by local landowners, was an 11 1/2-mile (18.5 km) extension between Leeming Bar and Leyburn that was authorised by the Bedale and Leyburn Railway Act 1853 (16 & 17 Vict. c. cxxxvii) on 4 August 1853; the section between Leeming Bar and Bedale station opened on 1 February 1855 and the remainder on 28 November 1855 for goods and minerals and 19 May 1856 for passengers. The York, Newcastle and Berwick had become a founder member of the North Eastern Railway (NER) on 31 July 1854, and the Bedale and Leyburn was absorbed into this larger company by the North Eastern Railway (Bedale and Leyburn and Rosedale Railways Amalgamation) Act 1859 (22 & 23 Vict. c. xci).

Liverpool, Manchester and Newcastle-upon-Tyne Junction Railway Act 1846
- Act of Parliament
- Parliament of the United Kingdom
- Long title: An Act for making a Railway, to be called "The Liverpool, Manchester, and Newcastle-upon-Tyne Junction Railway," with a Branch to the Town of Hawes.
- Citation: 9 & 10 Vict. c. xc

Dates
- Royal assent: 26 June 1846

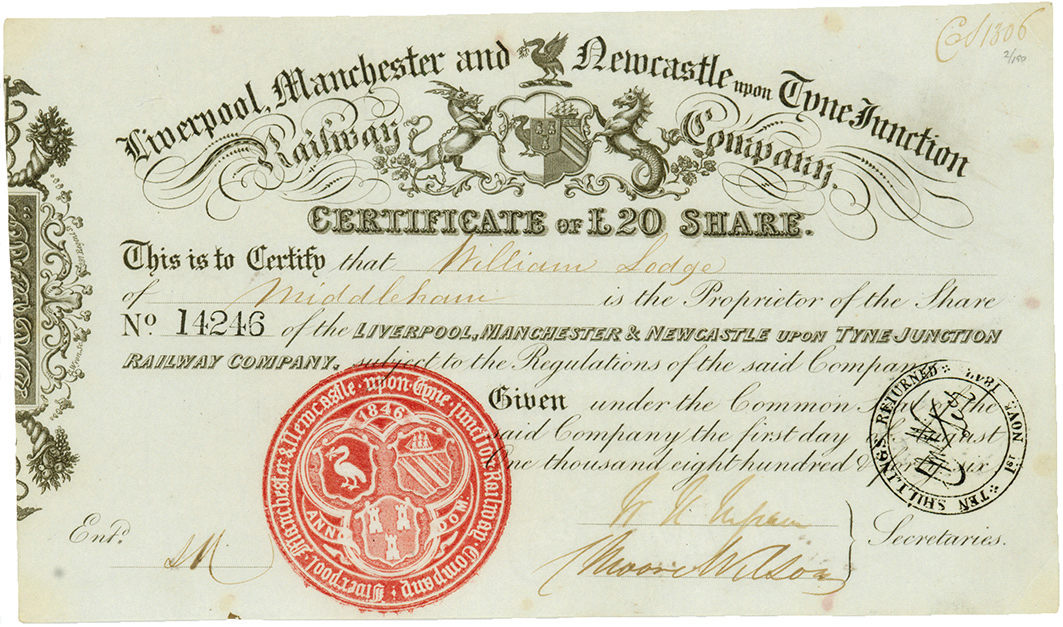
Share of the Liverpool, Manchester and Newcastle upon Tyne Junction Railway Company, issued 1. August 1846

The Liverpool, Manchester and Newcastle-upon-Tyne Junction Railway had been proposed in the mid-1840s railway mania to link Settle, Hawes and Askrigg, and the Liverpool, Manchester and Newcastle-upon-Tyne Junction Railway Act 1846 (9 & 10 Vict. c. xc) gave permission for a main line from Elslack, on the Leeds and Bradford Railway, to Scorton on the Richmond branch of the Great North of England Railway, and a branch line to Hawes, but this scheme failed.

North-eastern Railway Company's (Leyburn and Hawes Branch, &c.) Act 1870
- Act of Parliament
- Parliament of the United Kingdom
- Long title: An Act for enabling the North-eastern Railway Company to construct a railway from Leyburn to Hawes, and other works, and acquire additional lands; for the abandonment of the authorised Hawes and Melmerby Railway; and for vesting in the Company the undertaking of the West Durham Railway Company; and for other purposes.
- Citation: 33 & 34 Vict. c. cv

Dates
- Royal assent: 4 July 1870

Text of statute as originally enacted

In the late 1860s, several competing railways proposed to serve the agricultural land around Hawes. Eventually, the Midland Railway (Settle to Carlisle) Act 1866 (29 & 30 Vict. c. ccxxiii) was raised by the Midland Railway and authorised on 16 July 1866; it was mostly related to the Settle and Carlisle line but included a branch off this line between Garsdale and Hawes. The North-eastern Railway Company's (Leyburn and Hawes Branch, &c.) Act 1870 (33 & 34 Vict. c. cv), an act of Parliament raised by the North Eastern Railway for a railway between Leyburn and Hawes was authorised on 4 July 1870, though work did not start until 1874. The section of this railway between Leyburn and Askrigg opened on 1 February 1877; the section between Askrigg and Hawes was opened for goods on 1 June 1878. The Hawes branch of the Settle and Carlisle line was opened for goods on 1 August 1878; the sections between Askrigg and Hawes and between Hawes and Garsdale were both opened for passengers on 1 October 1878. The delays in the section between Hawes Junction and Hawes was down to the heavier engineering required on this section (one tunnel and two viaducts) with steeper gradients. In the months before the section opened, a landslip at Mossdale required extra work to excavate from the line.

The railway herein-before referred to and authorised by this Act is—

A railway (sixteen miles two furlongs and five chains or thereabouts in length) commencing in the township of Leyburn and parish of Wensley, in the north riding of the county of York, by a junction with the Bedale and Leyburn branch of the North-eastern Railway, and terminating in the township of Hawes and parish of Aysgarth, in the said north riding, by a junction with the authorised line of the railway first described in and sanctioned by "The Midland Railway (Settle to Carlisle) Act, 1866." — Section 5, North-eastern Railway Company's (Leyburn and Hawes Branch, &c.) Act 1870 (33 & 34 Vict. c. cv)

At this point, there was a through route between Northallerton and Garsdale. Both companies had running powers over each others' lines; the NER ran passenger trains westwards from Hawes (but no freight) and the Midland only exercised their right to run trains eastwards to Leyburn with occasional excursion traffic.

=== Rationalisation ===
The line remained a single track branch line, except for the double track section between Leeming Bar and Bedale. Chief commodities transported on the line were coal, milk, and stone. One passenger train each way was operated between Garsdale and Hawes until 14 March 1959 at which point this part of the line closed to all traffic, however, freight continued from Northallerton to Hawes until 1964. On 27 April 1964, the line between Redmire and Hawes closed completely. The track west of Redmire was lifted and many bridges on this section of the line were demolished in 1965. Most freight traffic on the line ceased in 1982, with the exception of the limestone traffic from Redmire to Teesside for steel-making, though this freight flow ceased in December 1992 when British Steel switched its limestone source to Hardendale in Cumbria. As a result of the removal of all but the one daily train, Leyburn loop and signal box were closed. Some excursion tours ran to Redmire in the 1970s, 1980s and early 1990s particularly the DalesRail services in 1977 which prompted interest in a renewed passenger service on the line.

== Services ==
At the opening of the railway to Leyburn in 1856, services consisted of either five or six return journeys. With the eventual opening of the line by 1878, the NER rans five trains per day between Northallerton and Garsdale, with the Midland Railway running an additional daily return train from Hellifield to Hawes, known colloquially as Bonnyface. In the 1880s, the Midland Railway ran two stopping passengers trains on the Settle-Carlisle Line, which would connect with the NER local trains to Northallerton from Hawes Junction (Garsdale). The Midland (and later the LMS) ran a second early morning train to Hawes on a Tuesday only, this was the day of the cattle market in Hawes. The 1896 timetable shows five workings from Northallerton to Hawes, four of which continued on to Hawes Junction. The return number down the valley towards Northallerton was the same; five in total, with four originating at Hawes Junction.

In 1914, services amounted to five daily return trips on the full length of the line. A further two trains went part way; Northallerton to Bedale arriving at 10:07 am, and Northallerton to Leyburn, arriving at 11:47 pm. In the other direction, the two extra trains were Leyburn to Northallerton leaving at 6:10 am and Hawes to Northallerton leaving at 9:05 am. By 1939, three trains ran the full length of the line in both directions, with two extra services either terminating, or starting from Leyburn and Hawes. By 1942, only two trains ran the whole length of the line, but the third service was reinstated by 1950.

After services ceased running eastwards from Hawes in 1954, the Bonnyface became a once-daily train connecting Hawes with Hellifield.

== Restoration ==
Point	Coordinates (Links to map resources)	OS Grid Ref	Notes
Northallerton West	54.3400°N 1.4482°W	SE35979396	
Ainderby	54.3245°N 1.4989°W	SE32689221	Closed
Scruton	54.3196°N 1.5336°W	SE30439165	
Leeming Bar	54.3053°N 1.5607°W	SE28689005	
Bedale	54.289°N 1.588°W	SE26918823	
Crakehall	54.2979°N 1.6335°W	SE23958920	Closed
Jervaulx	54.2998°N 1.6753°W	SE21228940	Closed
Finghall	54.3059°N 1.7182°W	SE18439006	
Constable Burton	54.3066°N 1.7455°W	SE16659014	Closed
Spennithorne	54.3060°N 1.7802°W	SE14409006	Closed
Leyburn	54.3080°N 1.8220°W	SE11679028	
Wensley	54.3108°N 1.8791°W	SE07969058	Closed
Redmire	54.3192°N 1.9286°W	SE04749151	

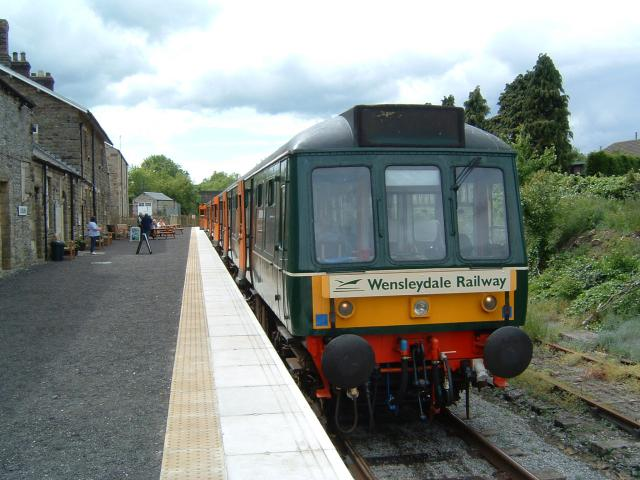
Diesel multiple unit at Leyburn railway station in 2005

The Wensleydale Railway Association (WRA) was formed in 1990 with the main aim of restoring passenger services. When British Rail decided to try to sell the line between Northallerton and Redmire following cessation of the quarry trains to Redmire, the WRA decided to take a more proactive role and aimed to operate passenger services itself. The Ministry of Defence (MoD) had an interest in using the line between Northallerton and Redmire to transport armoured vehicles to/from Catterick Garrison. The MoD paid for repairs and restoration of the line and the installation of loading facilities at Redmire, and did not object to WRC taking over the line. A trial train ran in November 1993 and full MoD operations started in July 1996. These military transport trains continue to this day.

In 2000, WRA formed a separate operating company, the Wensleydale Railway plc (WRC), and issued a share offer to raise funds. £1.2 million was raised through this method. Railtrack agreed to lease the line between Northallerton and Redmire to WRC and a 99-year lease was signed in 2003. Passenger services restarted on 4 July 2003 with the stations at Leeming Bar and Leyburn being reopened. In 2004, the stations at Bedale, Finghall and Redmire were reopened. A passing loop was opened at the site of the former Constable Burton station, which enabled the railway to introduce a 2-train service when required.

In 2014, Scruton station was reopened and a new station built at Northallerton West, enabling passenger services to be extended east of Leeming Bar, but this section was closed to passengers again in August 2016 following a collision between a train and a car at a level crossing near Yafforth. It is hoped to recommence services at a future date once work to upgrade level crossing equipment is complete.

In 2016, it was reported that the railway carries over 50,000 people a year and that for every £1 spent on the railway, £4 is spent at one of the towns or villages on the route.

The company's longer-term aim is to reopen the 18 miles (29 km) of line west from Redmire via Castle Bolton, Aysgarth, Askrigg, Bainbridge, Hawes and Mossdale to join up with the Settle-Carlisle Railway Route at Garsdale. A study commissioned by the railway indicated that an initial extension to Aysgarth from Redmire (3 miles (4.8 km)), would generate an extra income of £3.1 million per year into the local economy with an additional £500,000 in annual ticket sales for the railway. The sale of Aysgarth Station and trackbed to a private individual in 2017 allowed the release of funds and the short term plan is to extend some 3/4 mile (1.2 km) to a brand new station serving Castle Bolton. This has been costed at £2 million and is listed in a five-year plan. In order to achieve this, the missing bridge that used to span Apedale Beck to the west of Redmire station will need to be replaced. There was a plan to do so utilising a redundant bridge from the Catterick branch line that was removed during the A1 to A1(M) upgrade in 2015 and stored in Redmire Station car park. However the bridge was subsequently found to be unsuitable and it has been cut up and removed.

In January 2019, Campaign for Better Transport released a report identifying the line which was listed as Priority 2 for reopening. Priority 2 is for those lines which require further development or a change in circumstances (such as housing developments).

In 2019, services were suspended between Leyburn and Redmire due to the deterioration of the track infrastructure. As of 2024, services are still to resume between the two stations with trains still terminating at Leyburn. A fundraising appeal is currently taking place to fund the replacement of the life-expired track with a view to re-opening by September 2025.

=== Upper Wensleydale Railway ===
In late 2019/early 2020, a separate organisation, the Upper Wensleydale Railway, was formed to campaign to reinstate the line between Hawes and Garsdale. The group's objective is to have a timetabled year-round service run by a train operating company, rather than a heritage service. This scheme was shortlisted for funding in the second round of the government's Reverse Beeching Fund, in June 2020.

== Company structure ==
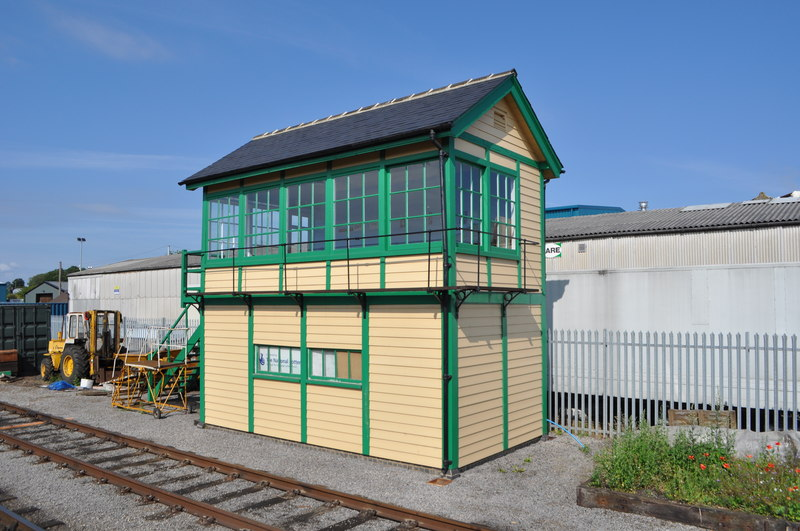
The ex Great Eastern Railway signal box at Leeming Bar. This was formerly the signal box at North Wootton

The Wensleydale Railway plc is responsible for the operation, maintenance and development of the railway line and passenger services. The company has a mixture of employed and volunteer staff.

The Wensleydale Railway Association (Trust) Ltd is a membership organisation and a registered charity that supports the development of the railway through fund raising, volunteer working, providing training and supporting work on heritage structures such as Scruton station and Bedale signal box.

== Locomotives ==
Diesel locomotives
Number & Name	Description	Current Status	Livery	Owner	Date Built	Photograph
37250	Class 37	Operational	EWS	Private Owner.	1964	
33035	Class 33	Operational	BR Blue	Pioneer Diesels	1961	
D9523	Class 14	Operational	BR Maroon		1964	
D9513	Class 14	Operational	NCB Blue	Private Owner	1964	
03144	Class 03	Operational	BR Blue		1960	
47714	Class 47	Operational	Rail Express Systems	Wensleydale Railway	1965	47714 in RES livery at Leeming Bar

The railway also has an 0-6-0 Sentinel Shunter and a Tyne and Wear Metro Shunter WL4.

Both 20169 and 37674, were moved from the Wensleydale Railway in December 2020.

Previously stored or unused locomotives, numbers No. 25313 (D7663), No. 31454, No. 37503 (D6717), No. 60086, and No. 60050 were all cleared from the railway in spring 2021. Class 9F No. 92219 was removed from the railway in December 2020 to a private site in Tebay, subsequently moving to the Strathspey Railway in 2023. Other locos were also moved from the Wensleydale Railway at the same time due to the railway being overcrowded and needing space to operate.

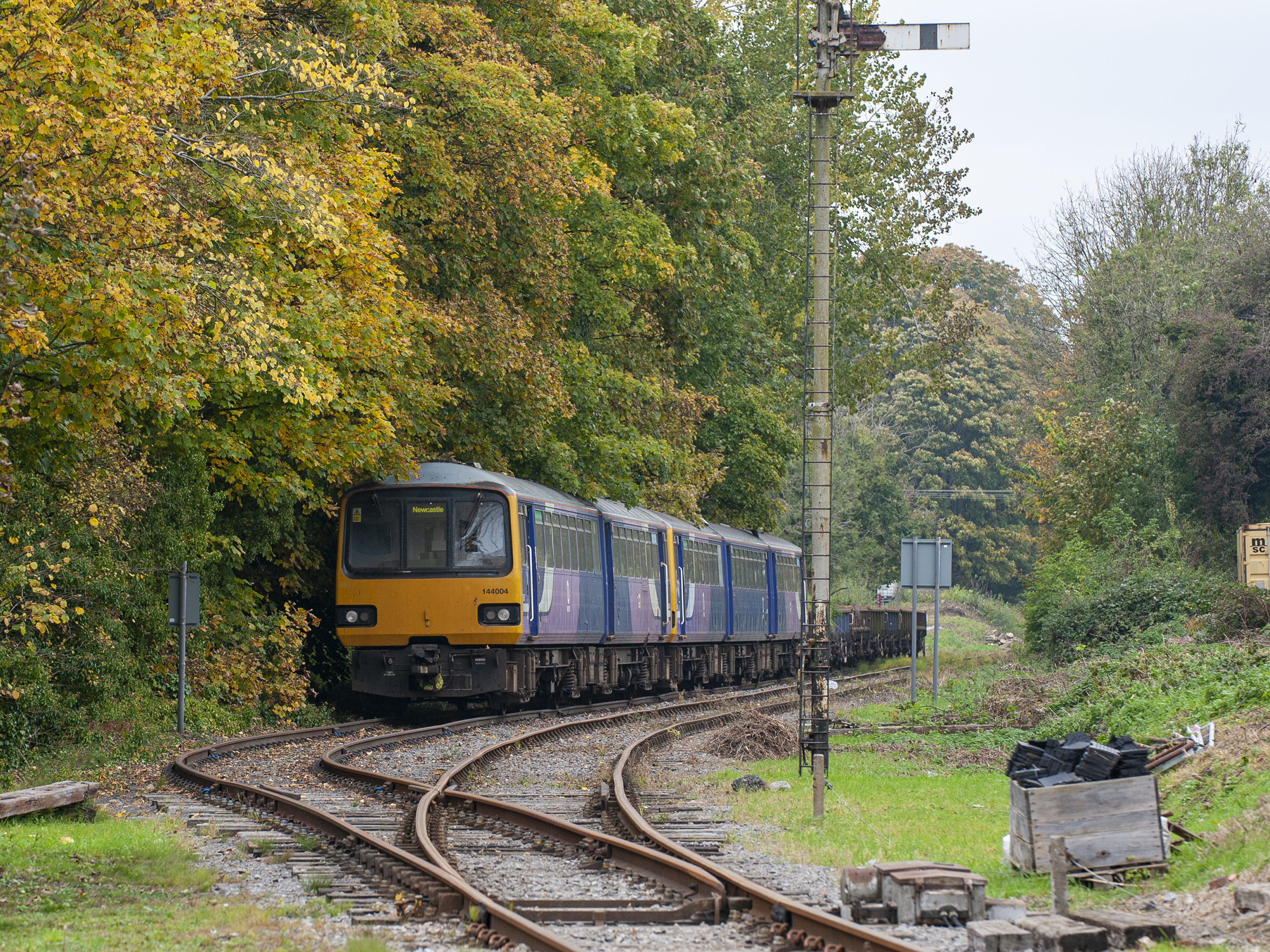
144004 and 144016 at Bedale

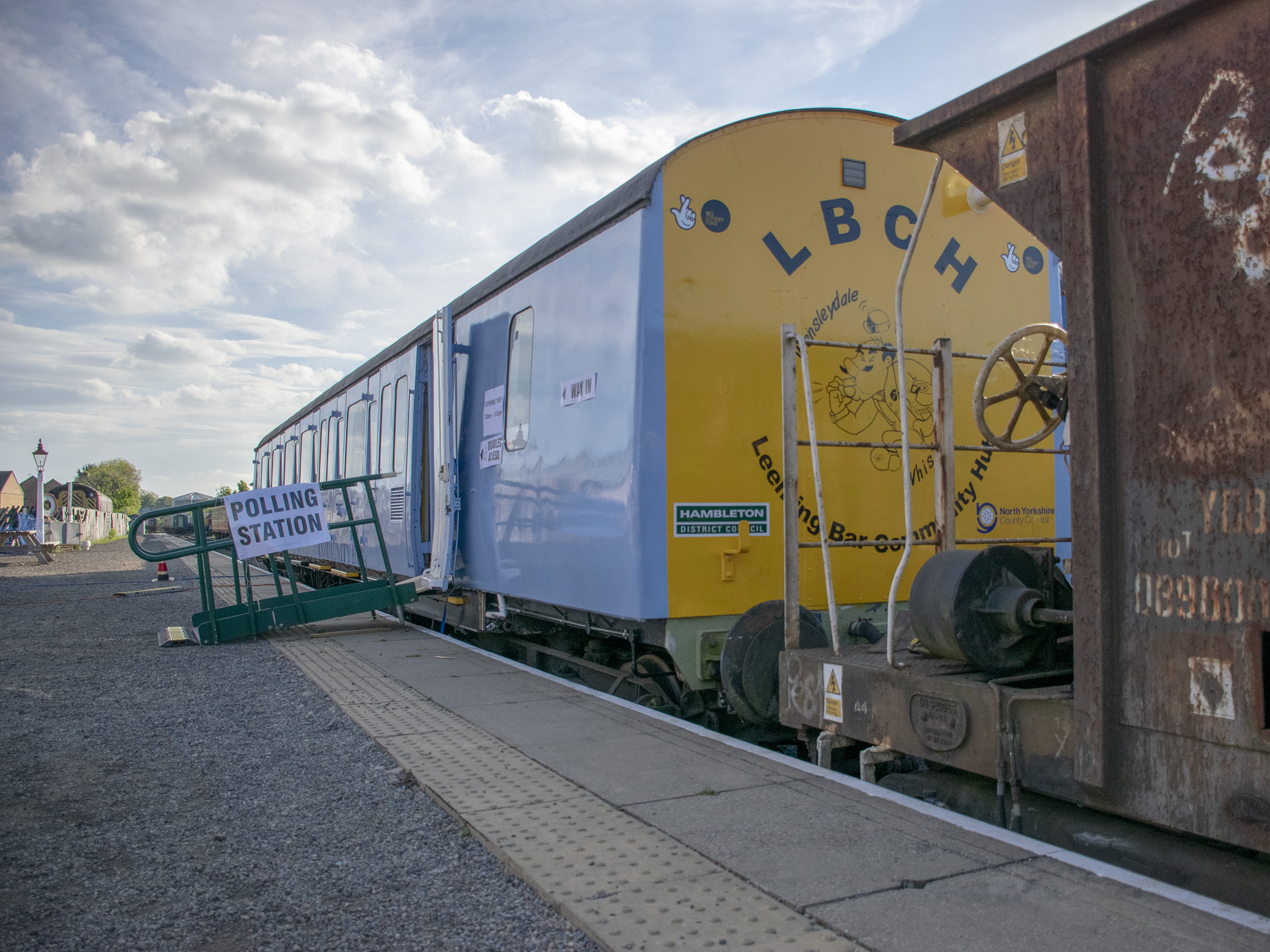
Leeming Bar Community hub

Diesel Multiple Units
Number & Name	Description	Current Status	Livery	Owner	Date Built	Photograph
55032	Class 121	Operational	BR Green		1960	
142018	Class 142	Stored	Northern Rail			
142028	Class 142	Stored	Northern Rail			
142041	Class 142	Stored	Northern Rail			
142060	Class 142	Operational	Northern Spirit	Private Owner		
142087	Class 142		Black with Orange Stripe	Sheffield University		
142090	Class 142	Operational	Black with Orange Stripe	Sheffield University		
143623	Class 143	Operational	Regional Railways			
144020	Class 144	Stored	Northern Rail			

- In the autumn of 2020, BR Class 144 Nos. 144004 and 144016, were temporarily stored at the railway, awaiting onward transport by road to the Aln Valley Railway. They departed the Wensleydale Railway in December 2020.

== Incidents ==
- 15 February 1867 – two trains collided on a single line section west of Newton-le-Willows station. The westbound train was in the process of moving forward to reverse shunt into the siding to allow the eastbound train to enter the station. Both trains were signalled onto the single line section at the same time and so collided head-on. Injuries were only to passengers in the eastbound train. (Note: Most sources, and modern mapping, list the westbound direction as the Down line, and the eastbound as the Up line. However, in the accident report for this crash, the Up and Down lines are reversed.) An inquiry recommended that a passing loop and a second platform be installed.
- 24 December 1894 – the ex-Hawes goods train was shunting the yard at Bedale when a heavy goods train arriving from Darlington collided with it. One of the wagons went down an embankment, but there were no injuries. However, passengers had to detrain and walk through the station to rejoin trains on either side of the accident to continue their journeys.
- 6 December 1900, a landslip north of Bedale Signal Box derailed a train so that it ended up in Bedale Beck. The fireman was scalded badly and taken to Northallerton Cottage Hospital, where he later died.
- 1988 – a limestone train from Redmire derailed on the level crossing outside Bedale railway station, damaging the track and station. Rotten wooden sleepers were attributed as the cause, with the resultant accident taking over 48 hours to clear-up and causing chaos on the local road network.
- 30 June 2011 – a tractor was hit by a train on Flood Bridge user-worked crossing (UWC).
- 1 August 2011 – a car was hit by a train on Fox Park level crossing between Jervaulx and Crakehall stations. No injuries were reported.

The above two accidents required the heritage railway to update and improve its safety management practices.

- 20 October 2012 – a car was hit by a locomotive on Fox Park level crossing.
- 30 January 2013 – a car was struck by a train at Aiskew level crossing, which took the A684 road over the railway (the A684 has bypassed this road since 2014).
- 3 August 2016 – a heritage train heading west from Northallerton West railway station struck a car on the level crossing near to the village of Yafforth. The lights and audible alarms were determined to have been in good working order. The car driver and two passengers on the train were injured.
