= Redmire railway station =

Railway station in North Yorkshire, England

Redmire
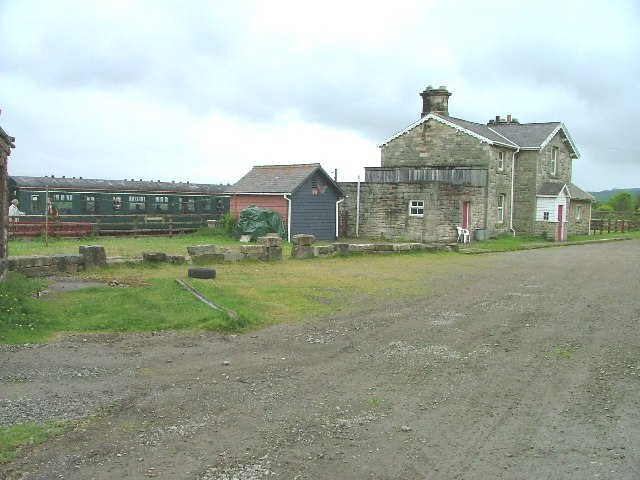

General information
- Location: Redmire, North Yorkshire; England
- Coordinates: 54.319190°N 1.928600°W
- Grid reference: SE047915
- System: Station on heritage railway
- Manager: Wensleydale Railway
- Platforms: 1

History
- Original company: North Eastern Railway
- Post-grouping: London and North Eastern Railway

Key dates
- 1 February 1878: Opened
- 26 April 1954: Closed
- August 2004: Reopened
- 2019: Services suspended
Location

Redmire railway station is the current western terminus of the Wensleydale Railway, although it is not currently served by passenger services, and serves the village of Redmire in North Yorkshire, England. Before temporary closure in 2019, it was the second busiest station on the Wensleydale Railway in terms of passenger numbers owing to its status as the western terminus of the line.

== History ==
The station was opened by the North Eastern Railway in 1878 as part of the Hawes extension of their route from Northallerton via Leyburn but it lost its passenger service in April 1954.

The site was redeveloped in the early 1990s by the Ministry of Defence to allow movement of military equipment by rail to and from Catterick Garrison, an operation that continues periodically to this day. Previously, the site was used as a quarry loading terminal for daily limestone trains to the now closed steelworks at Redcar. This traffic kept the 22 mile (35.6 km) branch from Northallerton open after the Beeching cuts of the 1960s claimed the remainder of the line towards Hawes but its end in December 1992 left the line's future in doubt until the MoD stepped in. The Wensleydale Railway subsequently leased the line from Railtrack and began operating passenger trains to Redmire in 2004. Passenger services were halted in 2019 due to the track being life expired with some sections dating from before the First World War. The Wensleydale Railway is currently fundraising to replace the track and allow services to reach Redmire once again.

Redmire Station House is now a Scout-owned activity centre giving children and other charities a base for a week or weekend visit to the area. Redmire Station House is owned by 2nd Acomb Scout Group, York and run on their behalf under a Declaration of Trust with four trustees. Redmire is primarily available for Scouts, youth groups and other charities. Other connected parties can also use the facilities away from peak times. Over its 50 years as a Scout Activity Centre, it has been visited by tens of thousands of children of varying abilities and backgrounds and other charitable organisations.

It is the long-term aim of the Wensleydale Railway to re-lay the line from Redmire to Garsdale on the Settle-Carlisle Railway.

== Notes ==
Preceding station	Heritage railways	Following station
Terminus	Wensleydale Railway Service suspended	Leyburn towards Leeming Bar
Proposed extension
Aysgarth towards Garsdale	Wensleydale Railway	Leyburn towards Leeming Bar
Historical railways
Aysgarth; Line and station closed	North Eastern Railway; Hawes Branch	Wensley; Line open, station closed
