= Leyburn railway station =

Railway station in North Yorkshire, England

Leyburn
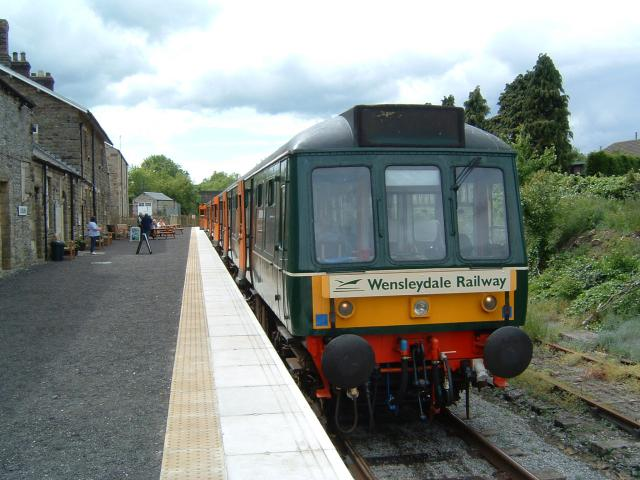

General information
- Location: Leyburn, North Yorkshire; England
- Coordinates: 54.3080°N 1.8220°W
- Grid reference: SE116902
- System: Station on heritage railway
- Manager: Wensleydale Railway
- Platforms: 1

History
- Original company: Bedale and Leyburn Railway
- Pre-grouping: North Eastern Railway
- Post-grouping: London and North Eastern Railway

Key dates
- 19 May 1856: Opened
- 26 April 1954: Closed
- May 2003: Reopened
Location

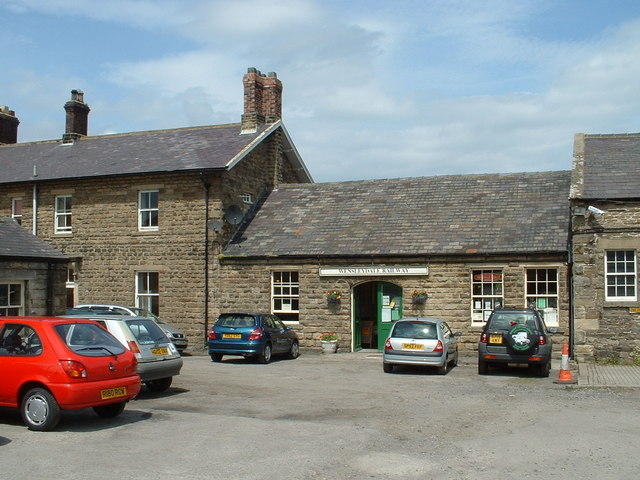
Leyburn station entrance in July 2003

Leyburn railway station is on the Wensleydale Railway, a seasonal, heritage service and serves the town of Leyburn in North Yorkshire, England. During the summer months it is served by at least three trains per day; at other times of the year the service is mainly at weekends and public holidays.

The Leyburn branch of the Wensleydale Railway Association (which incorporates the Friends of Leyburn Station-FOLS) meets monthly at the station.

The station postal address is Leyburn Station, Harmby Road, Leyburn, North Yorkshire, DL8 5ET.

== History ==
The railway first reached Leyburn in November 1855, when the Bedale & Leyburn Railway opened its line from Leeming (where it made an end-on junction with the York, Newcastle and Berwick Railway branch from Northallerton). Passenger services commenced six months later, with a further extension westwards to Hawes being built by the North Eastern Railway in 1877/8 (the NER having also absorbed the B&L in 1857). At Hawes, another end-on junction was made with the Midland Railway branch from Hawes Junction that gave the NER access to the Settle-Carlisle Railway by means of running powers (which it made use of for passenger trains).

The branch became part of the LNER under the terms of the 1923 Grouping. For most of its life, the route had a basic service of five passenger trains each day along its entire length with one or two extras reaching Leyburn from Northallerton, along with a small number of parcels, milk and goods trains. Nationalisation followed at the end of 1947, but less than a decade later the station was closed when the Northallerton to Hawes route fell victim to road competition, services being withdrawn on 26 April 1954.

The line beyond Redmire closed completely in April 1964, but aggregate traffic from the quarry there kept the rest of the line open. The steam-age equipment at the station, crane, water pump, were demolished in September 1966, however, Leyburn retained its status as a goods depot until 1982 (and a passing loop and signal box), but latterly the entire route operated as a 'one train' single line. The limestone traffic to and from Teesside ended in December 1992 but after a spell of disuse, traffic resumed in the form of Ministry of Defence military equipment trains to Redmire (where they were transferred for onward movement to/from Catterick Garrison).

Occasional passenger specials ran along the line, such as the "Three Dales Tour" on 20 May 1967.

== Preservation ==
The Wensleydale Railway reopened the station at Leyburn in May 2003 after leasing the line from Railtrack. The station buildings had survived after closure, which made the re-instatement of passenger facilities there straightforward.

Passenger trains initially ran eastwards from Leyburn to Leeming Bar, but these were extended on to Redmire in August 2004. As of 2024, trains currently terminate here as the line to Redmire is out of use. Since the preservation company had been in operation, they had planned to relay/re-instate a run-round loop trackbed (for heritage locos to run-round). They finally achieved this in Spring 2019 with a new line on the northern side of the station. The company hopes to one day eventually rebuild and reopen the abandoned line westwards to Hawes and eventually to Garsdale and run trains along the full length of the entire Yorkshire dale from Northallerton to Garsdale — a trip of almost 40 miles (64 km) in length (which would nearly make the railway itself the longest heritage line in the UK).

In July 2017, it was announced that the station was benefitting from a grant of £72,000, which would allow the installation of a passing loop, a water tower with water cranes, a footbridge and a signal box with working levers. The footbridge and signal box have been donated by Network Rail from redundant areas when upgrades have been carried out. In 2019, the passing loop was opened and the footbridge donated from Brigg Station in Lincolnshire, was refurbished by Cleveland Bridge & Engineering Company in a not-for-profit scheme. The signal box is from the Furness Railway and was previously located on the Cumbrian Coast Line.

Preceding station	Heritage railways	Following station
Terminus	Wensleydale Railway	Finghall towards Leeming Bar
Redmire Terminus	Wensleydale Railway Service suspended	Finghall towards Leeming Bar
Historical railways
Wensley; Line open, station closed	North Eastern Railway; Bedale and Leyburn Railway	Spennithorne; Line open, station closed
