= Leeming Bar railway station =

Railway station in North Yorkshire, England

Leeming Bar
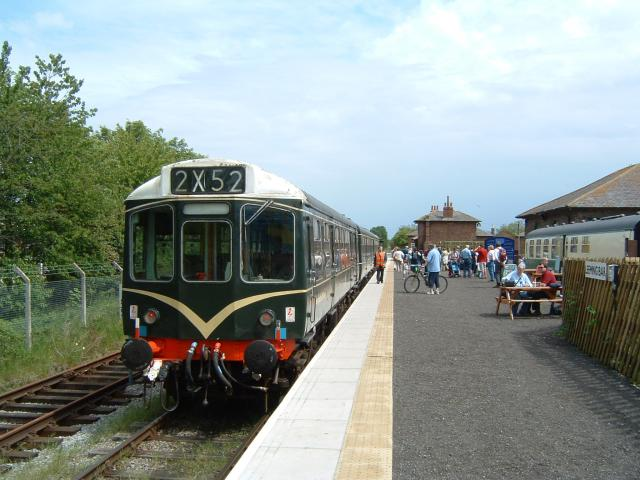

General information
- Location: Leeming Bar, North Yorkshire; England
- Coordinates: 54.305326°N 1.560705°W
- Grid reference: SE285900
- System: Station on heritage railway
- Manager: Wensleydale Railway
- Platforms: 1

History
- Original company: York, Newcastle and Berwick Railway
- Pre-grouping: North Eastern Railway
- Post-grouping: London and North Eastern Railway

Key dates
- 6 March 1848: Opened as Leeming Lane
- 1 July 1902: Renamed Leeming Bar
- 26 April 1954: Closed
- Spring 2003: Reopened

Listed Building – Grade II
- Feature: Leeming Bar Station
- Designated: 29 January 1988
- Reference no.: 1150916
Location

Leeming Bar railway station is a railway station in Leeming Bar, North Yorkshire, England. It is the penultimate eastern rail passenger station of the Wensleydale Railway, though the line continues towards Northallerton. Trains are timed to link in with Dales and District service buses to Northallerton to connect with the National Rail network.

== History ==
The locomotive shed of ca. 1848

The station was opened by the York, Newcastle and Berwick Railway (a constituent company of the North Eastern Railway) in 1848 as the terminus of their branch from Northallerton. The station building was probably designed by George Townsend Andrews who may also have designed the Grade II listed locomotive shed.

The line was then extended westwards to Leyburn by the Bedale and Leyburn Railway seven years later. A single-road locomotive shed was built at the west end of the station when the station opened up in 1848. The shed was still in use for the first and last trains of the day which terminated and started in Bedale. A shed had been proposed at Bedale as the intended terminus of the line, but with the extension to Leyburn, the shed at Leeming was retained.

The station was located on the start of a two-track section to Bedale, with two platforms and a 36-lever signal box. The station was originally called Leeming Lane due to being sited on a level crossing on the Great North Road. However, in July 1902, it was renamed Leeming Bar.

It closed to passengers in April 1954 when the Northallerton to Hawes service fell victim to road competition, but reopened under Wensleydale Railway ownership in the summer of 2003.

== Preservation ==
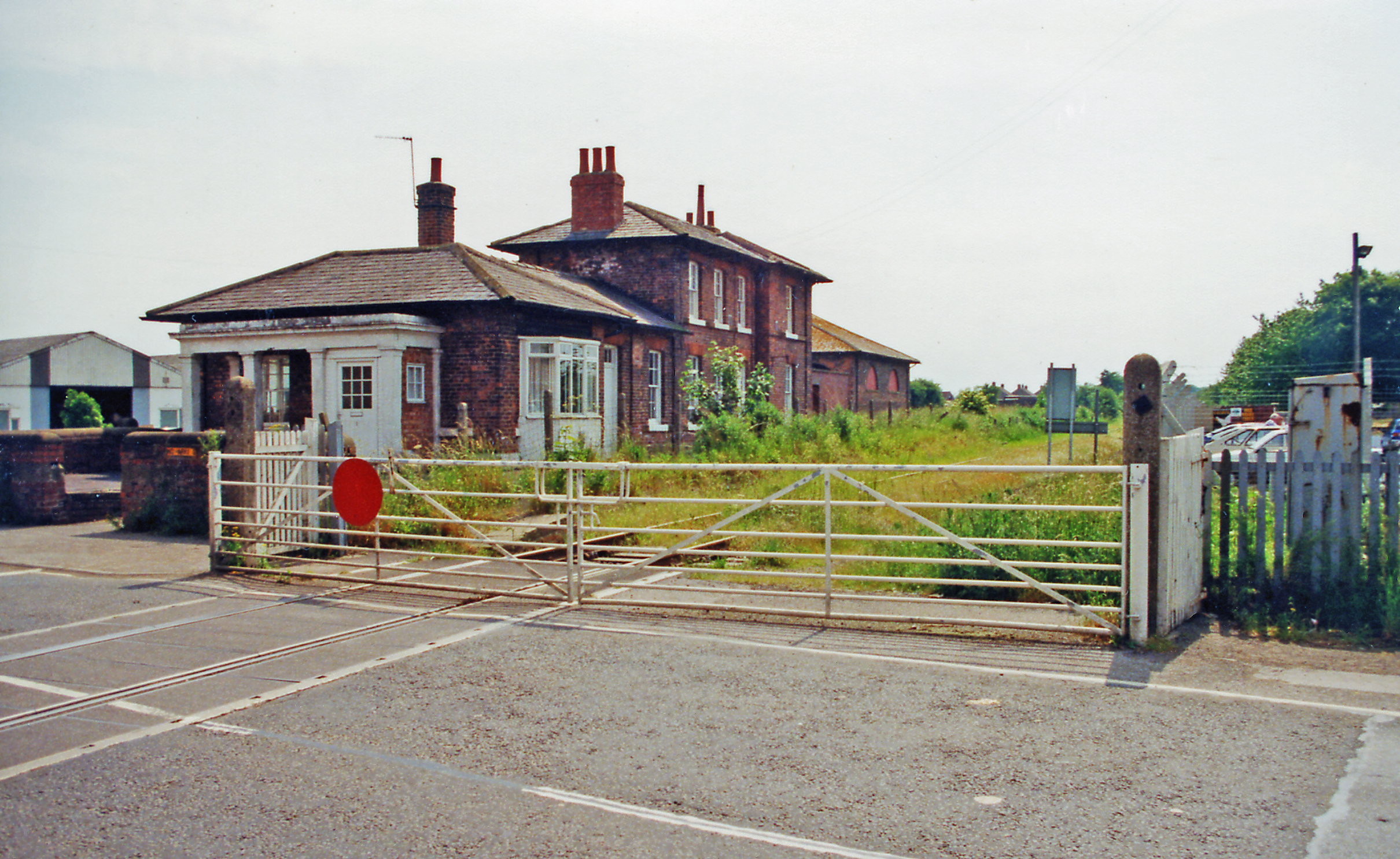
The station in June 2000

As well as the scheduled passenger service, the station also sees periodic train loads of military hardware travelling between Catterick Garrison and various destinations in the south of England via Northallerton and the East Coast Main Line. Most trains on the line terminate at Leeming Bar.

Plans are for passenger trains to eventually continue through Leeming Bar and run into Northallerton railway station. The first phase of this involved re-opening Scruton station and commissioning a temporary structure at Northallerton West in 2014, but this section was closed again in August 2016 following a collision between a train and a car at a level crossing near Yafforth. It is hoped to recommence services to Northallerton West at a future date once work to upgrade level crossing equipment is complete, although there are no current plans to do so. Scruton station later reopened and is currently the eastern terminus of the line, served by shuttles from Leeming Bar.

Leeming Bar is also the location of the Wensleydale Railway's head office and main workshop, where its rolling stock is stored and is visible from the A1.

The station building, on the south side of the railway station, is grade II listed with a classic portico entrance, which faces out onto the road over the level crossing which used to be the Great North Road. The station building was renovated in 2021. The former engine shed, which is now used by the heritage railway, is also grade II listed.

== See also ==
- Listed buildings in Aiskew and Leeming Bar

Preceding station	Heritage railways	Following station
Bedale towards Leyburn	Wensleydale Railway	Terminus
Terminus	Wensleydale Railway Shuttle service	Scruton Terminus
Historical railways
Bedale; Line and station open	North Eastern Railway; York, Newcastle and Berwick Railway	Scruton; Line and station open
