= Listed buildings in Sedbergh =

Sedbergh is a civil parish in Westmorland and Furness, Cumbria, England. It contains 165 listed buildings that are recorded in the National Heritage List for England. Of these, two are listed at Grade I, the highest of the three grades, 13 are at Grade II*, the middle grade, and the others are at Grade II, the lowest grade. The parish is in the Yorkshire Dales National Park. The major settlement is the small town of Sedbergh, and there are smaller settlements including Millthrop, Catholes, Marthwaite, Brigflatts, High Oaks, Howgill, Lowgill and Cautley. The parish contains a large area of countryside, and many of the listed buildings are farmhouses and farm buildings. In the town is Sedbergh School and a number of the school buildings are listed. Elsewhere in the town, most of the listed buildings are houses and associated structures, and shops. Other listed buildings in the parish include churches and associated structures, bridges, milestones, a hotel, a viaduct, a drinking fountain, memorials, and two telephone kiosks.

== Key ==
Grade	Criteria
I	Buildings of exceptional interest, sometimes considered to be internationally important
II*	Particularly important buildings of more than special interest
II	Buildings of national importance and special interest

== Buildings ==
Name and location	Photograph	Date	Notes	Grade
St Andrew's Church; 54.32309°N 2.52847°W		c. 1500	The church incorporates material from earlier periods, and was restored in 1886 by Paley and Austin. It is built in stone with sandstone quoins and dressings, and has a green slate roof. The church consists of a nave and chancel with a clerestory, continuous aisles incorporating a south chapel and a north vestry, and a south porch. At the west end is a three-stage tower with buttresses, a belfry stage corbelled out, and an embattled parapet with corner pinnacles. In the wall of the chapel is a sundial.	I
Crook of Lune Bridge; 54.36090°N 2.58578°W		16th century or earlier	The bridge carries a road over the River Lune. It is in stone, and consists of two asymmetrical segmental arches. The central pier has cutwaters, and rises to form triangular buttresses. The bridge has thin voussoirs, stone-slate bands, a narrow humped deck about 2 metres (6 ft 7 in) wide, parapets, and splayed abutments.	II*
Ingmire Hall, Stables and Cottage; 54.32080°N 2.55897°W		16th century or earlier	Originally a mansion with a pele tower, it was enlarged in the early 19th century by George Webster, partly destroyed by fire in the 1920s, and remodelled and extended in 1989. It is built in stone with quoins and slate roofs. The pele tower at the north is ruinous, and has a three-stage cylindrical stair turret with slit windows and a corbelled-out stepped parapet. From the pele tower extends an embattled curtain wall linking to the south wing, which is now the main part of the house. There are two storeys, with an attic in the wing, cross-windows and mullioned windows. Other features include more turrets and a mock turret. To the north are a stable block with turrets, a cottage and a cart shed.	II
The Old House at the Hill; 54.32644°N 2.52271°W	—	16th century (probable)	A small farmhouse, later a private house, in stone with a steeply pitched slate roof. There are three bays, 1.5 storeys at the front and two at the rear. In the south front are varied windows, one with a mullion, and on the north front is a gabled porch, a band, and windows including a stair window. Inside the house are two full cruck trusses.	II
Hebblethwaite Hall; 54.33434°N 2.47439°W	—	16th or early 17th century (probable)	Originally a farmhouse, it has been altered, and later a private house. It is in sandstone with quoins, and has a roof of stone-slate with some blue slate. The house has two storeys and an L-shaped plan. The windows are of varying types, and include mullioned windows, a mullioned and transomed window, and sash windows.	II
Thorns Hall and stable wing 54.32387°N 2.51840°W	—	Early to mid 17th century	The house and stable wing are in stone with quoins. The house has a roof of blue and green slate, two storeys and an attic, five bays, and an outshut and a wing with a pyramidal roof at the rear. On the front is a two-storey gabled porch with a round-headed doorway. Above it is a gabled dormer with a mullioned window and a ball finial; the other windows are sashes. The stable wing has a stone-slate roof, two storeys, a wagon doorway and three stable doorways, all with segmental heads and voussoirs, and ventilation slits.	II*
41 Main Street; 54.32362°N 2.52746°W	—	17th century (probable)	Originally a house, later a shop, it is in rendered stone, with the gable end facing the street. There are two storeys with an attic, and three bays. In the ground floor is a shop front with a central doorway flanked by pilasters, and with a frieze canted over the doorway. In the middle floor is a canted oriel window flanked by sash windows, in the attic are two cross-windows, and the gable has plain bargeboards.	II
Abbot Holme Bridge; 54.31182°N 2.54114°W		17th century (probable)	The bridge carries a road over the River Rawthey. It is in stone, straight and narrow, and consists of a single high segmental arch. The bridge has stone-slate bands, long voussoirs, four corbels on the north side, and a slightly humped deck with parapets and copings of large stone blocks.	II*
Catholes Farmhouse; 54.31129°N 2.53536°W	—	17th century	Originally a farmhouse, later extended, remodelled, and used for other purposes. It is built in stone and boulders, on a plinth of boulders, with quoins and a slate roof. There are two storeys, six bays, and coupled outshuts at the rear. On the front is a 20th-century brick porch and a 20th-century bay window. Most of the other windows are mullioned.	II
Garsdale Bridge; 54.32263°N 2.49872°W		17th century (probable)	The bridge carries a road over Clough River, and was altered in the 19th century. It is in sandstone, and consists of a single arch with a Tudor-style head. The bridge has double rows of voussoirs flanked by buttresses, and the parapets continue as boundary walls.	II
Lincoln's Inn Bridge; 54.32468°N 2.56770°W		17th century (probable)	The bridge carries the A684 road over the River Lune. It is built in stone and consists of two unequal segmental arches with voussoirs. The central pier has triangular cutwaters rising as triangular buttresses.	II
Middleton Bridge; 54.30203°N 2.56990°W		17th century (probable)	The bridge carries the A683 road over the River Rawthey. It is in stone and consists of a single wide segmental arch with two layers of voussoirs and a stone-slate arch band. The parapets have been rebuilt and have rounded coping and splayed ends. In the centre are square corbelled-out refuges.	II
Milestone at junction with Frostrow Lane; 54.32022°N 2.50727°W		17th century (probable)	The milestone is on the south side of the A684 road. It is in sandstone, and consists of a square shaft about 1 metre (3 ft 3 in) high with a partly obliterated inscription.	II
Millthrop Bridge; 54.31685°N 2.52207°W		17th century (probable)	The bridge carries a road over the River Rawthey. It is in stone and consists of two segmental arches of unequal span, with voussoirs and rebuilt parapets. In the centre, the pier has triangular cutwaters, the one on the west side rising to form a triangular refuge.	II
Mire House; 54.34308°N 2.47609°W	—	17th century	The house was later extended, including the addition of a cottage in the 18th century, and was later combined into one dwelling. It is in stone with quoins and a roof of stone-slate with some blue slate. There are two storeys, a central block of two bays, two service bays with an outshut to the left, a rear outshut, and the cottage to the right. In the main block is a segmental-headed doorway over which is a nearly semicircular canopy, and the windows on the front are sashes. The cottage has through-stones, a fixed window, and mullioned windows, and there is a similar window in the rear outshut.	II*
Pedge Croft Farmhouse; 54.32391°N 2.51423°W	—	17th century (probable)	The farmhouse is in stone, including boulder stones, the south front is roughcast, and the farmhouse has quoins and a green slate roof. There are two storeys, five bays, and a rear outshut. On the front is a wooden gabled trellised porch with bargeboards and a finial, and the windows are sashes. There is another porch at the rear, and in the outshut are three flat-roofed dormers.	II
Taythes Bridge; 54.35732°N 2.45439°W		17th century (probable)	A small footbridge crossing Taythes Gill, it is in stone and consists of a single segmental arch. There are voussoirs on the north side, and no parapets.	II
The Old Vicarage; 54.32168°N 2.52168°W	—	17th century (probable)	The vicarage, later a private house, has been altered and enlarged. It is in stone with a stone-slate roof. There are two storeys, and a central range of five bays flanked by single-bay extensions. Some of the windows are casements, and others are sashes. At the rear is full-height gabled turret with a bowed extension.	II
Browside Cottage; 54.31500°N 2.52167°W	—	Mid to late 17th century (probable)	A stone house with a stone-slate roof, two storeys, three bays, and a later rear outshut. The windows are mullioned, and above the ground floor windows is a stone-slate hood mould.	II
Fell Yeat Farmhouse; 54.31549°N 2.49777°W	—	Mid to late 17th century (probable)	Originally a small farmhouse, later restored as a private house, it is in stone with quoins and a stone-slate roof. There are two storeys, two bays, and an almost continuous rear outshut. Most of the windows are restored with mullions. In the left gable wall is a square-headed doorway.	II
Friends' Meeting House and cottage 54.31470°N 2.55354°W		1675	The Friends' meeting house was partly converted into a cottage in 1900. It is in stone, partly on a plinth, with a slate roof. The cottage has two storeys, the meeting house has one, and both are the same height. On the front is a two-storey gabled porch that has a round-headed outer doorway with a chamfered surround, above which is a replica of the original datestone, and inside is a square-headed internal doorway. The windows on the front have three lights and are mullioned.	I
1 Back Lane; 54.32288°N 2.52780°W	—	Late 17th century (probable)	A stuccoed house on a plinth with quoins and a stone-slate roof. There are two storeys and three bays. The doorway has a moulded surround, and the windows are sashes, those in the ground floor having moulded surrounds.	II
Birks Farmhouse and attached barn 54.34661°N 2.47196°W	—	Late 17th century (probable)	The farmhouse and barn are in stone with quoins, and a roof partly of slate and partly of stone-slate. The house has two storeys, three bays, a rear outshut forming an L-shaped plan, and a small barn attached to the west. On the front is a lean-to porch, and the windows are casements.	II
Cross Haw Farmhouse and outbuildings 54.34015°N 2.48334°W	—	Late 17th century (probable)	The farmhouse and outbuildings are in stone with quoins and a slate roof. The house has two storeys and three bays with a lean-to porch. All the windows are 20th-century replacements. To the left is a two-storey outbuilding with a single-storey extension, and to the right is a barn with an extension to the front.	II
High Birks Farmhouse; 54.31744°N 2.53761°W	—	Late 17th century (probable)	The former farmhouse is in stone with quoins, through-stones, and a stone-slate roof. There are two storeys and two bays. In the centre is a gabled porch, and the windows on the front consist of a fixed window with altered glazing, two sash windows, and a casement window. At the rear are the remains of mullioned windows and a blocked stair window.	II
Low Beckside Farmhouse, peat-house and barn 54.35474°N 2.47410°W	—	Late 17th century (probable)	The farmhouse and outbuildings were extended in the 19th century. They are in stone with quoins, and have a blue slate roof with stone ridge and copings. The house has two storeys, two bays, and a rear extension. On the front is a gabled porch with a square-headed outer opening, stone benches, and a Tudor arched inner doorway. Most of the windows are sashes. The peat-house and barn are attached to the south.	II
Low Brigflatts; 54.31406°N 2.55369°W	—	1677	A farmhouse and an attached private house in stone, the north face roughcast, with a roof of slate and stone-slate, and a stone ridge and gable copings. There are three unequal storeys and three bays. The building has various doorways and windows, some of which are blocked, and some of the windows are mullioned with hood moulds.	II
Archer's Hall; 54.31444°N 2.52627°W	—	1681	A stone farmhouse with a slate roof, it has two storeys, three bays, and a rear service bay giving a T-shaped plan. On the front is a two-storey gabled porch that has a slightly arched outed doorway with a moulded surround and a lintel with a hood mould. Most of the windows are casements, and there are two mullioned windows.	II*
Stone Hall; 54.32956°N 2.50620°W	—	1692	A farmhouse, later a private house, in stone with sandstone dressings and a green slate roof. There are two storeys with an attic, four bays, and a rear service wing, giving a modified L-shaped plan. On the front is a three-storey porch with a Tudor arched lintel, a hood mould, a fixed window in the ground floor, mullioned windows in the upper floors, a datestone panel, and a coped gable. Elsewhere, some of the windows are mullioned and others are sashes. Inside the house are upper cruck trusses.	II*
Thorns Cottage; 54.32457°N 2.51829°W	—	c. 1700	A house that was much altered in 1896–97 in picturesque style, it is in stone with a roof of stone slabs. There are two storeys and a symmetrical front of three bays. In the centre is a porch in variously coloured stones, with curved angles, a doorway with a shaped canopy, a Venetian window above, and a stepped parapet with coping and a cornice band. The windows are mullioned and contain casements. At the rear is an embattled wing with a corner turret, and a small round tower in the angle.	II
Abbot Holme House (west), barn and stable 54.31183°N 2.54244°W	—	Late 17th or early 18th century	The farmhouse and attached outbuildings are in stone with quoins and roofs of slate and some stone-slate. The house has two storeys, three bays, and a rear outshut. On the front is a simple porch, and the windows are sashes. To the left is the stable, with through-stones, a small square window, a segmental-headed doorway with voussoirs, and steps leading to a loft doorway at the rear. To the right is a two-bay barn that has a shallow segmental-headed doorway with voussoirs.	II
Beck Farmhouse and barn 54.36437°N 2.56482°W	—	Late 17th or early 18th century (probable)	The farmhouse and barn are in stone with slate roofs. The house has two storeys with an attic, four bays, and a rear outshut. On the front is a 20th-century gabled porch with a square-headed doorway, and the windows have altered glazing. At right angles to the left is the barn with a doorway and three windows, all with voussoirs.	II
Draw Well Farmhouse; 54.33592°N 2.56311°W	—	Late 17th or early 18th century (probable)	A stone farmhouse on a plinth, with quoins, through-stones, and a roof of blue and green slate with a stone ridge. It has two storeys, two bays, a rendered outshut at the rear, and a lean-to at the left. On the front is a porch with a tiled roof, and a continuous hood mould above the ground floor windows. Most of the windows are casements, and there is one sash window.	II
Bank barn, Draw Well Farm; 54.33598°N 2.56299°W	—	Late 17th or early 18th century (probable)	The bank barn is in stone with a green slate roof, and has a rectangular plan with four bays. In the east front are three shippon doors, one higher and approached by a ramp, and at the rear is a wagon entrance.	II
Gate Farmhouse; 54.36402°N 2.56880°W	—	Late 17th or early 18th century (probable)	A stone farmhouse with quoins, some through-stones, and a Cumbrian slate roof. It has two storeys and three bays. On the front is a gabled porch with a square-headed doorway and containing side benches. To the right of the porch is a stair window, and the windows contain 20th-century glazing.	II
High Fawes; 54.31840°N 2.46617°W	—	Late 17th or early 18th century	Originally a farmhouse, later much modernised and a private house. It is in stone with quoins and a stone-slate roof. There are two storeys, five bays, and a short rear wing, giving an L-shaped plan. On the front is a gabled porch with a square-headed doorway and a monolith lintel. The windows are replacements of the original mullioned windows.	II
Mackereth Hill and barn 54.33241°N 2.48740°W		Late 17th or early 18th century	The former farmhouse and attached barn are in stone with a stone-slate roof. The house has two low storeys, two bays, a lean-to porch, and square windows. The barn to the left has two doorways and a loading door.	II
Straight Bridge; 54.32567°N 2.49737°W		Late 17th or early 18th century (probable)	The bridge carries the A683 road over the River Rawthey, and was widened in the 19th century. It is in sandstone and consists of a single high segmental arch. The bridge has a double course of voussoirs on the southwest side, rebuilt parapets, and sloping abutments.	II
Thursgill; 54.33473°N 2.49229°W	—	Late 17th or early 18th century	Originally a farmhouse, later a private house, it was extended in 1883 and a porch was added in 1899. The house is in stone with sandstone quoins and a stone-slate roof. There are two storeys and five bays. On the front is a doorway with a datestone and another doorway. In the angle is a curved porch in Gothic style with a round-headed doorway, a datestone, and a quarter-conical blue slate roof. The windows are of varying types. Inside the original part of the house is a large inglenook bressumer.	II
Castlehaw Farmhouse; 54.32664°N 2.52077°W	—	1701	Originally a farmhouse, later a private house, it is in stone with sandstone quoins, stone-slate bands, and a stone-slate roof. There are two storeys and an attic, six bays, and a rear wing, forming an L-shaped plan. On the front is a gabled porch with a moulded Tudor arched opening, and an initialled and dated lintel, above which are pigeon holes, and inside the porch are stone benches. The windows are mullioned.	II
High Oaks; 54.31391°N 2.57473°W	—	1706	A stone house, partly rendered, with a slate roof. There are three storeys, a five-bay main block, a broad rear wing, and a lean-to. On the front is a gabled porch with a datestone, side benches, and a square-headed internal doorway. The windows are casements replacing mullioned windows. In the rear wing is a round-headed cellar window, a stair window, a mullioned window, and a small attic window.	II*
Rue Crofts and barn 54.33111°N 2.56125°W	—	1711	Originally a farmhouse, later a private house, in stone with quoins and a roof of slate with some stone-slate. There are two storeys, two bays, and a south wing. On the front is a small gabled porch, and the windows are of varied types. The barn to the north also has a rear wing.	II
Hollin Hill Farmhouse; 54.33044°N 2.50187°W	—	1712	A stone farmhouse with sandstone dressings and quoins, stone-slate bands, and a green slate roof. There are two storeys, three bays, and an added lean-to peat-house with a through-passage to the southwest. On the front is a gabled porch with a datestone over the opening, and the windows are sashes. At the rear are a lean-to porch and outhouse and a stair window.	II*
The Hill; 54.30911°N 2.57646°W	—	1712	The house is in stone with a stuccoed front, and has a stone-slate roof. There are three storeys, four bays, and a large rear wing. In the centre is a plain doorway and a moulded dated and initialled panel, and the windows are sashes.	II*
Old Grammar School; 54.32270°N 2.52766°W		1716	Originally a grammar school, later the library of Sedbergh School, it is in stone with freestone quoins and dressings, and a stone-slate roof. It has a rectangular plan, two storeys, and seven bays. The round-headed doorway in the gabled west front has pilaster jambs, moulded imposts, and a moulded head with a keystone, and above the door is a fanlight. Framing the doorway is an architrave with entablatures, a triglyph frieze, and a segmental pediment, over which is a tablet containing a carved shield. Along the sides are two tiers of round-headed windows with mullions and transoms, and moulded surrounds.	II*
Stable and School Room, Friends' Meeting House; 54.31498°N 2.55391°W	—	c. 1720	The building is in stone with a green slate roof and a rectangular plan. It consists of a single-storey stable, with a two-storey part to the left containing the schoolroom in the upper floor. In the stable is a large entrance doorway and windows, and the other part has a doorway in the ground floor and external steps leading to a doorway in the upper floor.	II
6 and 7 Settlebeck; 54.32287°N 2.51929°W	—	Early 18th century (probable)	Originally a farmhouse, later converted into two cottages, and then into one dwelling. It is in stone with quoins and a stone-slate roof. There are two storeys and four bays. On the front is a gabled porch with a doorway on the side, and the windows are sashes.	II
Barn north of Archer's Hall; 54.31471°N 2.52601°W		Early 18th century (probable)	The barn is in stone with quoins, some through-stones, a roof mainly of stone-slate with some blue slate, and four bays. It contains a segmental-headed wagon entrance with voussoirs, doorways, and square ventilation holes.	II
Beckside Farmhouse and barn 54.34876°N 2.56972°W	—	Early 18th century (probable)	The farmhouse and bank barn are in stone with roofs partly in slate and partly in stone-slate. The house has two storeys, three bays, a gabled porch, and sash windows. The barn to the left has a shippon under the left half and a three-bay lean-to on the front at the right with a wagon entrance. In the left part are through-stones, a doorway, and external steps leading up to a loading door.	II
Bluecaster; 54.36145°N 2.46206°W	—	Early 18th century (probable)	A former farmhouse with outbuildings in stone that have a roof partly in blue slate and partly in stone-slate. The house has two storeys, and an L-shaped plan formed by a two-bay main range and a short cross-wing at the south. On the front is a gabled porch, and the windows are of varying types. At the north end are outbuildings, one with a single bay, and beyond that a lower one of two bays at a lower level.	II
Barn, Fell Yeat Farm; 54.31522°N 2.49779°W	—	Early 18th century (probable)	A bank barn in stone with irregular quoins and a roof mainly in stone-slate. It has two unequal storeys and four bays, and a shippon under the northwest end. The barn contains a wagon entrance approached by a ramp and a mullioned window. Elsewhere there is a square-headed doorway to the shippon, and square ventilation holes.	II
Barn, Garth's Farm; 54.32602°N 2.56429°W	—	Early 18th century	The barn is in stone with sandstone quoins, and a roof partly of stone-slate and partly of blue slate. It has an L-shaped plan with a 19th-century extension at right angles. The earlier part has a ramp leading to a wagon doorway, and a shippon doorway. In the newer part are three shippon doors, two windows, and a loading door. At the rear is a wagon doorway with a gabled porch, and a lean-to extension.	II
High Beckside Farmhouse and former barn 54.35506°N 2.47332°W	—	Early 18th century (probable)	The farmhouse and the barn, which has been incorporated into the house, are in sandstone with quoins and a stone-slate roof. The house has two storeys and five bays. On the front is a gabled porch with a square-headed opening and pigeon holes above, and the windows are mullioned. The former barn to the right contains a segmental-headed wagon entrance and ventilation slits.	II
High Branthwaite Farmhouse; 54.33471°N 2.56082°W	—	Early 18th century (probable)	A stone farmhouse with quoins and a roof mainly of stone-slate with some blue slate. There are two storeys and three bays. On the front is a gabled porch with a segmental-headed doorway and stone benches. The windows on the front are sashes, and at the rear are two stair windows and mullioned windows.	II
Barn, Low Haygarth Farm; 54.36520°N 2.46843°W	—	Early 18th century (probable)	The barn is in stone and boulders with quoins and a stone-slate roof. It has three bays, and contains two wagon doorways, one with a porch, and the other with voussoirs and a keystone, and ventilation slits. Attached to the west gable is a lean-to stable.	II
Low Ridding and former barn 54.33371°N 2.48808°W	—	Early 18th century (probable)	Originally a farmhouse with an attached barn, converted into a private house and a separate dwelling. It is in stone with quoins and a slate roof with a stone ridge. The house has two storeys with attics and five bays, with the former barn converted into a rear wing. On the front is a gabled porch that has a Tudor arched inner doorway with a chamfered surround and a hood mould. The windows are mullioned.	II
Milestone near Fairmile Beck; 54.37413°N 2.57215°W	—	Early 18th century	The milestone is in sandstone and consists of a square post about 40 centimetres (16 in) high. There are inscriptions on all four sides giving the distances in miles to Kendal and to Sedbergh, the other inscriptions being illegible.	II
Mill Cottage; 54.34850°N 2.56743°W		Early 18th century (probable)	The cottage is in stone with sandstone quoins and a composition tile roof. There are three storeys, a main range of two bays, and a one-bay extension recessed to the left. On the front of the main range is a shallow gabled porch and a doorway with voussoirs. Most of the windows are casements.	II
Moss Farm and Moss Cottage; 54.32143°N 2.50863°W	—	Early 18th century (probable)	A farmhouse later divided into two dwellings, in stone, partly roughcast, with quoins and a roof partly of slate and partly of stone-slate. It has two storeys, five bays, and a rear wing giving an L-shaped plan. On the front is a lean-to porch, and the windows on the front are sashes. In the rear wing are mullioned windows and a casement window.	II
Spedding House and barn 54.31503°N 2.52128°W	—	Early 18th century (probable)	The house and barn are in stone with quoins. The house has a roof partly of slate and partly of stone-slate, two storeys, five bays, and a rear extension. On the front is a gabled porch, above which is a blind window, the other windows being sashes. The barn, higher and to the right, has a slate roof, and contains through-stones, a doorway and a window, both with segmental heads, a loading door, and ventilation slits, and at the rear is a wagon doorway.	II
Taythes Farmhouse; 54.35752°N 2.45562°W	—	Early 18th century (probable)	The former farmhouse is in stone, partly roughcast, with quoins, some through-stones, and a roof of green slate with an eaves course of stone-slate and a stone ridge. There are two storeys, two bays, and a lean-to peat-house at the right. On the front is a gabled porch with a square-headed doorway, a projecting lintel, and a ball finial. Most of the windows are sashes.	II
Thwaite Farmhouse; 54.34726°N 2.57218°W	—	Early 18th century (probable)	The farmhouse is in roughcast stone with a roof partly of green slate and partly of stone-slate. There are two storeys, a centre block of three bays, an earlier bay at the north, and a peat-house at the south end. On the front of the centre block is a gabled porch and sash windows. The bay to the north has a doorway with a plain surround, a tilting casement window and a fixed window above, and in the peat-house is a doorway and a window. At the rear are mixed windows, including a mullioned stair window.	II
Low Haygarth Farmhouse; 54.36537°N 2.46836°W	—	1728	The former farmhouse is in stone with quoins, through-stones, and a composition tile roof. There are two storeys, five bays, and a rear wing with an integral outshut. In the centre of the front is a two-storey porch with a square-headed outer opening, stone benches, and an inner doorway with a lintel inscribed with initials and the date. Most of the windows are casements. The rear wing also has a gabled porch containing stone benches, a fixed window and sash windows.	II
Cross Keys Hotel; 54.36650°N 2.46649°W		1732	Originally a farmhouse or an inn, later altered and extended and used as a hotel. It is in stone with quoins and a slate roof. The hotel has two storeys and a front of five irregular bays. Above the doorway is a dated and initialled lintel. The windows are of varying types, some are mullioned and some are sashes, and there are three half-dormers.	II
48 and 50 Main Street; 54.32375°N 2.52717°W	—	Early to mid 18th century	A shop with living accommodation above, in stone with a stuccoed front, and a slate roof. There are three storeys, three bays, and a long rear wing, giving an L-shaped plan. In the left part of the ground floor is a shop front with decorative pilasters, a frieze, and a cornice. To the right is a doorway with a moulded surround, a fanlight, and a cornice on consoles, and to the right of this is a fixed window. The middle floor contains sash windows with segmental heads, and in the top floor are casement windows.	II
Barn, Castlehaw Farm; 54.32650°N 2.52045°W	—	Early to mid 18th century	A barn and shippon in stone with quoins, through-stones, and a roof partly of slate and partly of stone-slate. It has an L-shaped plan, with a main range and a shippon forming a south wing. The openings include a wagon entrance with a porch, doorways, windows, and ventilation openings.	II
Bank barn, Catholes Farm; 54.31174°N 2.53611°W	—	Early to mid 18th century (probable)	The barn is in stone with quoins, through-stones, and a stone-slate roof. It has a rectangular plan with five bays, and a shippon under the south end. There are wagon entrances and outshuts on both north and south fronts, and a shippon doorway in the west gable end.	II
Gateside House; 54.32436°N 2.48471°W	—	Early to mid 18th century (probable)	Originally a small farmhouse, later a private house, it is in stone with quoins and a slate roof. There are two storeys, two bays, and a large lean-to extension to the right. On the front is a gabled porch with a square doorway and side benches. The windows are top-hung casements, and above the ground floor windows is a hood mould.	II
Hallbank; 54.32034°N 2.49164°W	—	Early to mid 18th century	A stone house with a stone-slate roof, two storeys, three bays, and a 20th-century flat-roofed extension to the rear. On the front is a lean-to porch with side benches and a square-headed inner doorway. The windows are casements, with a stone-slate hood mould above the ground floor windows.	II
Bank barn, High Branthwaite Farm; 54.33454°N 2.56019°W	—	Early to mid 18th century (probable)	The barn is in stone with quoins, through-stones, and a stone-slate roof. It contains two square-headed wagon doorways, a shippon at the north end, ventilation slits, and other doorways.	II
Barn adjoining Hollin Hill Farmhouse; 54.33055°N 2.50170°W	—	Early to mid 18th century	A bank barn in stone with sandstone quoins, through-stones, and a stone-slate roof. It has an L-shaped plan, with a seven-bay main range and a three-bay wing at right angles linking to the farmhouse. On the south front is a small porch. The openings include shippon doorways, a loading doorway, windows, a segmental-headed wagon entrance, ventilation slits and square holes, and dove holes.	II
Kilnbeck Farmhouse and barn 54.32548°N 2.48676°W	—	Early to mid 18th century (probable)	The farmhouse and attached bank barn are in sandstone with quoins. The farmhouse has a roof of blue slate with a stone ridge. There are two storeys, three bays, a square-headed doorway, and sash windows. The barn to the left dates from the 19th century, it has a corrugated sheet roof, through-stones, a square-headed wagon doorway, and a small window.	II
Low Branthwaites; 54.31518°N 2.48705°W	—	Early to mid 18th century (probable)	A former farmhouse with barns, it is in sandstone with some through-stones, and a roof partly in blue slate and partly in slate-stone. The house has two storeys and two bays, a barn attached at both ends, and a rear wing. On the front is a gabled porch, and the windows are casements. The former barn to the left has been incorporated into the house. The barn to the right has a segmental-headed doorway with voussoirs, a square-headed doorway, and two windows. In the rear wing are a mullioned stair window, an altered windows, and a casement window.	II
Low Hollins Farmhouse and garden wall 54.31562°N 2.50293°W	—	Early to mid 18th century (probable)	The farmhouse is in stone with irregular quoins and a slate roof. There are two storeys with an attic and four bays. On the front is a gabled porch that has a square-headed doorway with a moulded surround and a side bench. The windows are top-hung casements imitating sashes. Enclosing the garden is a drystone wall about 1 metre (3 ft 3 in) high.	II
Nether Bainbridge Farmhouse; 54.34202°N 2.56736°W	—	Early to mid 18th century (probable)	The farmhouse, later a private house, is in stone with quoins and a roof partly of slate and partly of stone-slate. There are two storeys with an attic, three bays, and a short stair outshut and a wing at the rear, giving a T-shaped plan. In the front is a central square-headed doorway, casement windows in the ground floor, and sash windows in the upper floor. In the left gable end is a mullioned window and in the attic is a pigeon hole.	II
18 and 19 Back Lane; 54.32336°N 2.52521°W	—	18th century (probable)	Originally an agricultural building, it was converted into two houses in the 19th century. The houses are in stone with quoins. Behind No. 19 is a wing, giving the building an L-shaped plan. There are three storeys and most of the windows are sashes, irregularly placed. The entry to No. 17 is from an alley on the left. No. 19 has a simple porch with a pitched roof of two green slates.	II
9 and 11 Howgill Lane; 54.32390°N 2.52949°W	—	Mid 18th century (probable)	A small house (No. 9. Winder Cottage) and a cottage in stone with quoins on the right and a roof in blue slate. There are two storeys, No. 9 has two bays, and No. 11 has one. Both have square-headed doorways and sash windows.	II
4 Main Street; 54.32353°N 2.53000°W	—	18th century	A stone house with large irregular quoins and a slate roof with stone ridge slates. There are two storeys with an attic, and two bays. The doorway has a square head, and the windows in the lower two floors are sashes. The windows in the upper floor have segmental heads and voussoirs. In the attic is a fixed window.	II
35 Main Street; 54.32361°N 2.52783°W	—	18th century (probable)	Originally two shops with accommodation above, later combined into one shop, it is in stone with a stone-slate roof. There are two storeys, the upper storey jettied and roughcast, and three structural bays. In the centre of the ground floor are three doors, and these are flanked by shop windows. The upper floor contains two widely separated casement windows. There is a set-back part at the left containing a garage door with a two-light window above.	II
Abbot Holme House (east) and barn 54.31194°N 2.54205°W		Mid 18th century (probable)	The farmhouse and barn are in stone with quoins, and roofs partly of slate and partly of stone-slate. The house has two storeys and two bays, with a square-headed doorway, and windows, those in the upper floor being sashes. At the rear are through-stones, a doorway, and windows that include a stair window and a mullioned window. To the right is an attached cart shed linking to the barn that is canted back. The cart shed contains a wagon doorway, and the barn has ventilation slits, a blocked doorway with a massive lintel, and a lean-to porch. At the rear is an outshut.	II
Barn northwest of Archer's Hall; 54.31470°N 2.52655°W	—	18th century (probable)	A bank barn in stone with some quoins, and a roof mainly of stone-slate with some blue slate. In the south side is a wagon doorway with a lean-to porch, and on the north side are five shippon doorways with massive lintels, and a loading door. On both sides are square ventilation holes.	II
Banty Gill Bridge; 54.34945°N 2.56407°W		18th century (probable)	The bridge carries Howgill Lane over Chapel Beck. It is in stone and consists of a single almost semicircular arch, with voussoirs, a thin stone-slate band, and straight parapets with flat coping.	II
Birks Cottage; 54.31730°N 2.53760°W	—	18th century (probable)	A stone cottage, partly pebbledashed, with quoins and a stone-slate roof. There are two storeys and two bays. The windows are sashes, and on the right return is a porch.	II
Former barn, Catholes Farm; 54.31141°N 2.53565°W	—	18th century (probable)	Originally a bank barn, later converted for other uses, it is in stone with quoins and a stone-slate roof. It has a rectangular plan, with a former shippon under the south end, and an outshut at the north. On both sides are wagon doorways with shallow segmental heads and voussoirs, and there are also ventilation slits, now glazed.	II
Barn, Cautley Thwaite Farm; 54.36239°N 2.47149°W	—	18th century	The barn is built in stone and boulders with through-stones, quoins, a stone-slate roof, and a long rectangular plan. It contains doorways, windows and loading doorways.	II
Danny Bridge; 54.31619°N 2.46534°W		18th century (probable}	The bridge carries a road over Clough River. It is in sandstone and consists of a single low segmental arch springing from natural rock. The bridge has voussoirs, a flat deck, and parapets with flat coping stones.	II
Garden wall with bee-boles, Draw Well Farm; 54.33583°N 2.56305°W	—	18th century (probable)	The drystone wall encloses the garden and is about 1.5 metres (4 ft 11 in) high. It contains two rectangular bee boles in the outer face.	II
Garth's Farmhouse; 54.32622°N 2.56470°W	—	18th century	The farmhouse was extended in the 19th century. It is in stone on a plinth, and has a stone-slate roof with some blue slate. There are two storeys and four bays. On the front is a gabled porch with a square-headed opening and containing side benches. The windows on the front are casements, and at the rear they include a fixed window and a stair window.	II
Green Farmhouse; 54.32029°N 2.51030°W	—	Mid 18th century (probable)	The former farmhouse is in stone with quoins and a slate roof. There are two storeys with an attic, two bays, a lean-to dairy at the rear, and a lean-to peat-house to the right. On the front is a gabled porch with a square-headed doorway and side benches. The windows on the front are sashes, at the rear there are altered windows, a stair window, and two casement windows. In the left gable wall are through-stones and a 20th-century porch.	II
Marshall House and railings 54.32363°N 2.52696°W	—	Mid 18th century	A roughcast stone house with a slate roof. There are three storeys and five bays. The doorway has a moulded surround and a segmental pediment, and to its left is a two-storey canted bay window. The windows are sash windows. Enclosing the front area are cast iron railings with anthemion heads, and to the right of the doorway is a lantern on a bracket.	II
Millers Cottage; 54.34868°N 2.56731°W	—	18th century (probable)	A stone cottage with a slate roof, two storeys, and a symmetrical front of two bays. On the front is a shallow gabled porch, and the windows are sashes.	II
New Bridge; 54.32199°N 2.51624°W		18th century	The bridge carries the A684 road over the River Rawthey. It is in stone and consists of two segmental arches, and has a central pier with triangular cutwaters surmounted by pediments. The bridge has squinches, and parapets with grooved coping stones, curved outwards at the corners.	II
Barn, Taythes Farm; 54.35745°N 2.45603°W	—	18th century (probable)	The barn has an attached stable and privy, and is in sandstone with quoins, and a roof partly of blue slate and partly of stone-slate. The barn has a square-headed doorway reduced in size, another doorway with a lintel, and a buttress at the rear. The stable has a loading door, a doorway with a massive lintel, and though-stones.	II
High Wardses Bridge; 54.35854°N 2.47063°W	—	18th century (probable)	The bridge carries a road over the River Rawthey. It is in stone, and consists of a single almost semicircular arch. The bridge has voussoirs and parapets with flat sandstone copings.	II
Evans House and railings 54.32341°N 2.52924°W	—	1750–59	A house, later extended and used by Sedbergh School, it is in roughcast stone with rusticated quoins and a slate roof, and is in Georgian style. The main block has three storeys and a symmetrical five-bay front, and there is an extension to the east. In the centre is a doorway with an Ionic architrave with engaged columns, a pulvinated frieze and a modillioned cornice. The windows are sashes, the window above the doorway with a round head, and the others with segmental heads. In the roof is a flat-topped dormer. Enclosing the area at the front are railings on a low stone plinth.	II
Low Birks; 54.31733°N 2.53716°W	—	1762	Originally mill workers' cottages and stables, later converted into a house and a cottage. They are in stone with quoins with a stone-slate roof, and have two storeys and five bays. On the front of the cottage is a gabled porch, there is a re-set datestone, and most of the windows are casements.	II
49 and 51 Main Street; 54.32362°N 2.52710°W	—	Mid to late 18th century (probable)	Two shops combined into one with living accommodation above, it is stuccoed with a slate roof. There are three storeys and a symmetrical front of three bays. In the ground floor is a shop front, flanked by panelled and fluted pilasters surmounted by fluted consoles with triangular pediments. Between is a sloping frieze with a modillioned cornice, and in the centre is a cast iron column with a composite cap. Behind the column is a pair of recessed doorways with moulded pilaster jambs and fanlights. In the upper floors are sash windows.	II
Blands Gill Farmhouse and barn 54.34998°N 2.56064°W	—	1766	The farmhouse and bank barn are in stone with quoins and a green slate roof. The house has two storeys and two bays. On the front is a wide gabled porch with a stone-slate roof, a square-headed outer opening, side benches, and above it is a datestone. The windows have large wedge lintels and contain altered glazing, and at the rear is a stair window. The barn to the left has shippon doorways, a hay store, and a lean-to porch.	II
15, 16 and 17 Back Lane; 54.32334°N 2.52551°W	—	Late 18th century	Originally a wheelwright's cottage and workshop, later used for other purposes, it is in stone with quoins on the left, and a slate roof. Behind the cottage is a wing, giving the building an L-shaped plan. The cottage has three storeys, a sash window in each floor, and a doorway with a moulded architrave and a cornice on consoles. The workshop to the right is the same height with two storeys. In the ground floor is a segmental-headed doorway with voussoirs, above which is a sash window.	II
20 Back Lane; 54.32339°N 2.52506°W	—	Late 18th century (probable)	A stone house with quoins, a slate roof, three storeys and two bays. In the ground floor is a central doorway that has an architrave with panelled pilasters and a cornice on brackets; this is flanked by sash windows. The middle floor contains two flat-roofed canted oriel windows with panelled aprons, and in the top floor are tall half-dormers.	II
7 Folly Yard; 54.32353°N 2.52538°W	—	Late 18th century (probable)	A stone cottage with quoins and a slate roof. There are two storeys, two bays, a doorway, and windows, all with segmental heads and voussoirs.	II
9 and 11 Folly Yard; 54.32346°N 2.52536°W	—	Late 18th century (probable)	A pair of stone cottages with a slate roof, three storeys and three bays. There are two fixed windows, and the other windows are sashes. Most of the openings in No. 11 have massive stone lintels.	II
3 Main Street; 54.32341°N 2.53042°W	—	Late 18th century (probable)	A sandstone house with quoins and a stone-slate roof. There are two storeys, four bays, and a rear wing, giving an L-shaped plan. The windows are sashes.	II
33 Main Street; 54.32359°N 2.52794°W	—	Late 18th century (probable)	A stone house with a slate roof, three low storeys and two bays. The right bay has a double door in the ground floor and above is a tall round-headed window with voussoirs and Y-tracery. In the left bay are mullioned and transomed windows in the lower floors and a casement window in the top floor.	II
Walled garden, Evans House; 54.32279°N 2.52951°W	—	Late 18th century (probable)	The walls are mainly in stone, and partly in brick, with stone coping, and enclose a garden of trapezoid shape. They are between 2 metres (6 ft 7 in) and 3 metres (9.8 ft) high. In the centre of the north wall is a segmental-headed doorway.	II
57 Main Street; 54.32367°N 2.52676°W	—	c. 1800	A house, later a shop, in roughcast stone with a slate roof. There are three low storeys with cellars, and a symmetrical front of two bays. In the ground floor is a shop front with pilasters, a frieze, a cornice, and a central recessed doorway. In the upper floors are sash windows, and at the rear is a canted oriel window jettied over the cellar entrance.	II
2 and 3 Weavers Yard; 54.32344°N 2.52753°W	—	c. 1800 (probable)	Originally a pair of weavers' cottages, later combined into one unit. The building is in stone with quoins and a stone-slate roof. There are three storeys and four bays. The doorway is in the upper floor and is approached by a flight of external steps, and there is another doorway in the ground floor. All the openings have sandstone lintels.	II
5 and 7 Weavers Yard; 54.32345°N 2.52736°W	—	c. 1800 (probable)	A pair of stone cottages with quoins and a slate roof. They have two low storeys and each cottage has one bay. The windows are sashes.	II
33 Loftus Hill; 54.32026°N 2.52615°W	—	Late 18th or early 19th century (probable)	A stone cottage with quoins and a slate roof. There are two storeys, two bays, and a lean-to extension to the right. The windows are sashes.	II
34 and 35 Loftus Hill; 54.32011°N 2.52632°W	—	Late 18th or early 19th century (probable)	A stone house with quoins and a slate roof. There are two storeys and a symmetrical front of two bays. In the centre is a square-headed doorway with a rendered surround, and the windows are sashes.	II
1, 2 and 3 Settlebeck; 54.32303°N 2.51937°W	—	Late 18th or early 19th century (probable)	A row of three stone houses with quoins and a stone-slate roof. There are three storeys, and each house has one bay. Nos. 1 and 2 have paired doorways with large stone lintels, and the doorway of No. 3 has a segmental head with voussoirs. Most of the windows are sashes, and there is one top-hung casement window.	II
Hebblethwaite Cottage and barn 54.33462°N 2.47455°W	—	Late 18th or early 19th century (probable)	Originally a pair of back-to-back cottages, later combined into a single cottage, with a barn attached to the west, and partly incorporated into the house. The building is in sandstone with roofs mainly of blue slate and with some stone-slate. The cottage has two storeys and two bays with a plain doorway. In the ground floor are inserted casement windows, and above the windows are sashes. In the barn are square and slit ventilators.	II
Barn, Low Hollins Farm; 54.31564°N 2.50314°W	—	Late 18th or early 19th century (probable)	A bank barn with a stable or store, it is in stone with a stone-slate roof. The barn has an L-shaped plan, with a main range, and a two-bay two-storey link at right angles to the farmhouse. The link contains a segmental-headed arch with voussoirs and a keystone, and a square-headed doorway with a loading door above. In the north gable a flight of steps leads up to a doorway.	II
Railton Yard; 54.32345°N 2.52709°W	—	Late 18th or early 19th century (probable)	A row of four cottages, one of which has retained a first-floor spinning gallery, and which have otherwise been restored and altered. They are in brick with quoins and a stone-slate roof. There are two storeys and six bays, and most of the windows are renewed sashes.	II
Rawthey Bridge (road); 54.37550°N 2.44278°W		1812	The bridge carries the A683 road over the River Rawthey. It is in sandstone, and consists of a high semicircular arch with voussoirs, a keystone, curved abutments, and straight parapets with sandstone copings. The bridge has a flat deck.	II
36 and 37 Loftus Hill; 54.32004°N 2.52625°W		Early 19th century (probable)	A pair of stone cottages, No. 36 is roughcast, with a slate roof. There are two storeys, and each cottage has one bay. Above the doors are fanlights, and the windows are sashes.	II
Former smithy, Farfield Mills; 54.32207°N 2.49822°W		Early 19th century (probable)	Originally a smithy, later a private house, it is in stone with quoins and a stone-late roof. There are two storeys, two bays, and a large lean-to at the right. In the centre is a gabled porch, and the windows are casements.	II
Barn and cottage, High Birks Farmhouse; 54.31746°N 2.53777°W	—	Early 19th century (probable)	The cottage and barn are attached to the left of the farmhouse. They are in stone with quoins and stone-slate roofs, and both have two storeys. The cottage to the right has one bay, a doorway, and one sash window in each floor. The barn is higher, and has four bays. On the front of the barn are doorways, windows and a loading door, and at the rear is a wagon doorway in the upper level.	II
Farm buildings, Ingmire Hall; 54.32057°N 2.56112°W	—	Early 19th century (probable)	The farm buildings are in stone with quoins and slate roofs, and include re-used 17th-century material. They form an irregular plan, and consist of a bank barn, a shippon at right angles, a parallel store, and a curved stable range ending in a barn.	II
Ingmire Gardens and associated walled garden 54.32124°N 2.55813°W		Early 19th century (probable)	This consists of a gardener's cottage, an attached tower, a screen wall, and a walled garden. The cottage, which is probably later, is in stone with quoins and a slate roof. It has two storeys, three bays, and sash windows. The tower to the north is higher, with two storeys, sash windows, a projecting stepped parapet, and a stair tower. The screen wall is gabled, and the wall surrounding the kitchen garden has a stone-slate coping, and is about 3 metres (9.8 ft) high. There is also a range of outbuildings, and a gateway with metal gates.	II
Milestone near Archer's Hall; 54.31416°N 2.52908°W		Early 19th century	The milestone is in sandstone, and has a square plinth with chamfered corners and a semicircular shaft. It is inscribed with a letter and a number.	II
Milestone near Sunny Bank; 54.32124°N 2.55139°W	—	Early 19th century (probable)	The milestone is in sandstone, and has a square plinth with chamfered corners and a semicircular shaft. It is inscribed with letters and numbers.	II
Barn, Mire House; 54.34331°N 2.47579°W	—	Early 19th century (probable)	A bank barn in stone with quoins, through stones, and a roof of blue slate and stone-slate. It has a rectangular plan, and contains a segmental-headed wagon entrance in the upper level and four lower doorways.	II
Uldale House; 54.36427°N 2.41556°W	—	1828	A farmhouse with a cottage that was extended in 1879. It is in stone with quoins and a slate roof. There are two storeys, a central block of three bays, a single-bay extension to the left, and a single-bay cottage to the right. In the centre is a square-headed doorway with a datestone above, and the windows in the central block are sashes. The extension contains a casement window, and in the cottage is an altered window in the ground floor and a sash window above.	II
79 and 81 Main Street; 54.32370°N 2.52580°W	—	Early to mid 19th century (probable)	A pair of stone houses with a hipped slate roof. There are three storeys, three bays, and a central through-passage containing the entrances. The passage has a semi-elliptical head with voussoirs and an arch band. Attached to the jambs of the archway are stone walls about 2 metres (6 ft 7 in) high enclosing service yards. In the upper floors are sash windows.	II
4 and 5 Settlebeck; 54.32295°N 2.51930°W	—	Early to mid 19th century (probable)	Two stone cottages with quoins at the junction, and roofs of slate at the front and stone-slate at the rear. Each cottage has two storeys and two bays, a central doorway and sash windows. Above the doors, and the windows on the ground floor, are large stone lintels.	II
Milestone near Killington New Bridge; 54.31110°N 2.58052°W		Early to mid 19th century	The milestone is on the south side of the B6256 road. It is in sandstone with a square plinth with chamfered corners, and has a semicircular shaft with a rounded top inscribed with initials and numbers.	II
Mill House; 54.34857°N 2.56736°W		Early to mid 19th century (probable)	The house is in stone with sandstone quoins and a slate roof. There are two storeys, a symmetrical front of three bays, and a rear service wing, giving a T-shaped plan. The house has a central doorway with a plain surround, and the windows are sashes.	II
Holy Trinity Church; 54.34953°N 2.56503°W		1838	The church, designed by Edmund Sharpe in Early English style, is in stone with sandstone dressings and a slate roof. It consists of a nave and a short chancel, with a bellcote on the west gable. The windows are lancets, with a triple stepped lancets at the east end. Inside the church is a west gallery.	II
Wesleyan Methodist Chapel; 54.34205°N 2.47935°W		1845	The chapel is in sandstone, on a plinth, with quoins, a moulded gutter cornice, and a green slate roof. It has a rectangular plan and consists of a single cell with one storey and a symmetrical front of two bays. In the centre is a round-headed window with monolithic pilasters, moulded imposts and a keystone. Above the door is a fanlight, and over the doorway is an inscribed plaque. The windows are round-headed with fanlights.	II
St Mark's Church; 54.34579°N 2.47667°W		1845–47	The church was designed by William Butterfield in Decorated style, and the vestry was added in 1858–60. It is in stone with freestone dressings, and has a green slate roof. The church consists of a nave with a south porch, and a chancel with a north vestry. On the west gable is a double bellcote with ogee-headed openings.	II
Palmers Hill; 54.32370°N 2.53021°W	—	1848	Originally a row of six almshouses, in Jacobean style, later converted into three dwellings. They are in s stone with sandstone quoins and a blue slate roof. The building has a single storey and nine bays. All the openings have lintels and hood moulds, and all the windows are casements.	II
St Gregory's Church; 54.32402°N 2.56381°W		1850	The church was built as an Anglican mission chapel for railway workers on the Ingleton branch line, it was enlarged in 1907, and is now redundant. It is in stone with sandstone dressings and quoins, and has a slate roof with a wooden lantern. The church consists of a nave, a south porch, and a chancel as a cross-wing. The doorway is on the right side of the porch and has a gablet containing a cross. On the north gable is a bellcote, and the windows are rectangular. On the roof is a long lantern containing lights with segmental heads, overhanging eaves, and a swept hip roof.	II
37 and 39 Main Street; 54.32360°N 2.52762°W	—	Mid 19th century (probable)	A pair of shops with rendered upper floors and a slate roof. There are three storeys and five bays, channelled pilasters at the corners and a plain frieze and a moulded string course between the top floors. In the ground floor is a wooden shop front with fluted pilasters, diamond capitals, panelled aprons, an entablature with a plain frieze and diamond panels, and a moulded cornice, and containing three doorways with fanlights. In the upper floors are sash windows.	II
95 Main Street; 54.32366°N 2.52499°W	—	Mid 19th century (probable)	A house at the end of a row, in stone with quoins and a slate roof. It has two storeys and two bays. The doorway has a lintel with foliage decoration and a cornice on consoles. To the right is a canted bay window with a panelled frieze and a moulded cornice. The windows are sashes with corniced architraves.	II
Cautley Thwaite Farmhouse; 54.36227°N 2.47156°W	—	Mid 19th century	A stone farmhouse with a slate roof, two storeys, a range with a symmetrical front of three bays, and a rear service wing. On the front is a porch with a canopy, and a square-headed doorway. The windows are sashes.	II
Cross Hall Cottage; 54.33988°N 2.48182°W	—	Mid 19th century (probable)	A stone house with quoins and a slate roof. There are two storeys and a symmetrical front of two bays. The doorway has a square head and a fanlight, and the windows are sashes.	II
Barn north of Cross Keys Hotel; 54.36684°N 2.46623°W	—	Mid 19th century (probable)	The barn is in stone with quoins and a stone-slate roof. It has a rectangular plan with lean-to extensions at each end. The barn contains a segmental-headed doorway with voussoirs, and a plain doorway, and to the right is an integral stable with a square-headed doorway and a loading door.	II
Rawthey Bridge (railway); 54.31233°N 2.55007°W		1857–61	The bridge was built by the Lancaster and Carlisle Railway Company to carry the railway over the River Rawthey, and is now disused. It consists of a single segmental-arched span in cast iron with arcades in the spandrels. The parapet is in wrought iron. The abutments are in rusticated sandstone with chamfered angles and Doric entablatures.	II
Lune Viaduct; 54.33170°N 2.56952°W		1857–61	The viaduct was built to carry the Ingleton branch of the London and North Western Railway over the River Lune, and is now disused. The central span is in cast iron and consists of a segmental arch that has spandrels filled with two tiers of round-headed arches, and ornamental parapets. This is flanked by three sandstone round-headed arches. The central piers and the abutment piers taper and have modillioned cornices and parapets with triangular upstands. The intermediate piers are rectangular, with impost bands, plain friezes, cornices, and parapets.	II*
80, 82 and 84 Main Street; 54.32377°N 2.52483°W	—	Mid to late 19th century	A row of three stone houses with quoins and a slate roof. There are three storeys, and each house has one bay. Every house has a doorway to the left and a sash window in each floor to the right. Above the ground floor openings is a continuous hood mould rising above each opening, and in the middle floor the windows have separate hood moulds.	II
86 Main Street and 1 New Street; 54.32375°N 2.52462°W	—	Mid to late 19th century (probable)	A shop and a house, the shop on a corner site, they are in stone with quoins, a canted corner, and a slate roof. There are three storeys, two bays on Main Street, a corner bay, and three bays on New Street. In the ground floor of No. 86 Main Street is a shop front including a doorway. No. 1 New Street has a doorway with a cornice and a sash window in the ground floor. The upper floors contain sash windows.	II
3 and 5 New Street; 54.32384°N 2.52457°W	—	Mid to late 19th century (probable)	A pair of stone houses in a terrace with a slate roof. There are three storeys, No. 3 has three bays, and No. 5 has one. The doorways, in the outer bays, have panelled pilasters, plain friezes, and moulded cornices, and the windows are sashes.	II
7 and 9 New Street; 54.32392°N 2.52455°W	—	Mid to late 19th century (probable)	A pair of stone houses in a terrace, with quoins on the left, and a slate roof. There are three storeys with cellars, and each house has one bay. The doorways are paired in the centre and have a double architrave, panelled pilasters on the sides, a plain frieze, and a prominent moulded cornice on consoles with a shallow hipped roof. There is one sash window in each floor.	II
Killington New Bridge; 54.31144°N 2.58184°W		Mid to late 19th century	The bridge carries the B6256 road over the River Lune. It is stone and consists of a single segmental arch. The bridge has voussoirs, piers, and plain parapets that project over the piers.	II
Milestone near Low Ridding; 54.33311°N 2.48718°W		Late 19th century	The milestone is on the west side of the A683 road. It is in cast iron, and consists of a short triangular shaft with a semicircular head. The head is inscribed with "SEDBERGH & KIRKBY STEPHEN ROAD CAUTLEY", and on the sides of the shaft are the distances in miles to Sedbergh and to Kirkby Stephen.	II
Milestone near Steps End; 54.34736°N 2.47572°W	—	Late 19th century	The milestone is on the west side of the A683 road. It is in cast iron, and consists of a short triangular shaft with a semicircular head. The head is inscribed with "SEDBERGH & KIRKBY STEPHEN ROAD CAUTLEY", and on the sides of the shaft are the distances in miles to Sedbergh and to Kirkby Stephen.	II
Milestone by High Wardses; 54.35918°N 2.46885°W		Late 19th century	The milestone is on the west side of the A683 road. It is in cast iron, and consists of a short triangular shaft with a semicircular head. The head is inscribed with "SEDBERGH & KIRKBY STEPHEN ROAD CAUTLEY", and on the sides of the shaft are the distances in miles to Sedbergh and to Kirkby Stephen.	II
Milestone at NGR 7045 9731; 54.37038°N 2.45654°W	—	Late 19th century	The milestone is by a wall on the east side of the A683 road. It is in cast iron, and consists of a short triangular shaft with a semicircular head. The head is inscribed with "SEDBERGH & KIRKBY STEPHEN ROAD CAUTLEY", and on the sides of the shaft are the distances in miles to Sedbergh and to Kirkby Stephen.	II
Milestone near Low Branthwaites; 54.31671°N 2.48285°W		Late 19th century	The milestone is on the north side of the A684 road. It is in cast iron, and consists of a short triangular shaft with a semicircular head. The head is inscribed with "SEDBERGH & HAWES ROAD FROSTOW & SOOLBANK", and on the sides of the shaft are the distances in miles to Sedbergh and to Hawes.	II
Milestone near junction with Frostrow Lane; 54.32023°N 2.50572°W		Late 19th century	The milestone is on the south side of the A684 road. It is in cast iron, and consists of a short triangular shaft with a semicircular head. The head is inscribed with "SEDBERGH & HAWES ROAD FROSTOW & SOOLBANK", and on the sides of the shaft are the distances in miles to Sedbergh and to Hawes.	II
School House, Sedbergh School; 54.31955°N 2.52679°W	—	1878	Designed by Paley and Austin in Jacobean style, the building is in sandstone with a slate roof. It has an H-shaped plan, with a main range, wings at the ends, and a cross-wing to the west wing. There are two storeys with attics, the main range has six bays, and there are gabled dormers in the roof. The windows are mixed, some are cross-windows, some are mullioned, and others are mullioned and transomed. At the northeast corner is a tower with a coped parapet and a pyramidal roof with a weathervane.	II
Barn, Uldale House; 54.36429°N 2.41580°W	—	1879	A bank barn in stone with quoins, some through-stones, a slate roof, and a shippon under the west end. The barn has a segmental-headed wagon entrance with voussoirs approached by a ramp with side walls, Flanking the ramp are oculi with rusticated surrounds. In the west gable wall are three shippon doors and square windows.	II
Classroom block, Sedbergh School; 54.32182°N 2.53153°W	—	1879–89	The block, designed by Austin and Paley in Jacobean style, is in sandstone on a chamfered plinth with a green slate roof. It has an irregular H-shaped plan, with a main range and cross-wings of different lengths. There are two storeys with attics, and a main range of six bays, with a string course and a parapet with ridged coping. In the main range are transomed windows, mullioned windows, and gabled dormers, and elsewhere are cross-windows.	II
Sedbergh School Chapel; 54.32037°N 2.52722°W		1895–97	The chapel was designed by Austin and Paley in Perpendicular style, and is built in sandstone with stone-slate roofs. The chapel has a cruciform plan, consisting of a nave and chancel in one vessel, low north and south aisles, full-height transepts, and a north porch. At the crossing is an octagonal flèche.	II*
Boundary wall, Sedbergh School Chapel; 54.32012°N 2.52701°W	—	c. 1897	The wall runs along the east and south boundaries of the chapel grounds. It is a low sandstone wall with flat coping, stepped up a slope, with low wrought iron railings. At each end are gateways with octagonal piers and ornamental wrought iron gates, and at the south end is a lamp standard with a barley-sugar twisted shaft and a cruciform top.	II
Drinking fountain 54.32345°N 2.52821°W		1897	The drinking fountain is built into the churchyard wall of St Andrew's Church, and was built to commemorate the diamond jubilee of Queen Victoria. It is in sandstone and has a recessed centre flanked by fluted pilasters, above which is an inscribed pulvinated frieze and a semicircular pediment. In the centre of the recess is a convex bowl with a brass cup on a chain, and a black marble inscribed plaque. In the tympanum of the pediment is a relief sculpture, and the fountain is flanked by stone side benches.	II
Queen Victoria Memorial Cross; 54.32058°N 2.53971°W	—	1902	The cross to the memory of Queen Victoria stands in a garden designed by Thomas Mawson. It is in sandstone, and consists of an Anglo-Celtic cross about 5 metres (16 ft) high. The cross has a tapering rectangular shaft on a shaped plinth. There is decorative carving on the cross-head, and there are inscriptions on both faces.	II
Boer War Memorial, Sedbergh School; 54.32077°N 2.52745°W	—	c. 1902–05	The memorial commemorates the former pupils of the school who died in the Second Boer War. It is in sandstone, and consists of a plinth of four steps, a square base, a square tapering shaft with chamfered corners, a chamfered cornice, and a wheel-cross. On the sides of the base are panels inscribed with the names and details of those lost.	II
Powell Hall, Sedbergh School; 54.32187°N 2.53223°W	—	1904–06	The school assembly hall was designed by Paley and Austin in Perpendicular style. It is in sandstone with freestone quoins and dressings, and a green slate roof. The hall consists of a tall single-storey hall with three two-storey gabled classroom wings to the west, a narthex at the south, and a canted apse at the north. Some windows are mullioned, one is transomed, and there are three full-height canted oriel windows. There are two doorways on the front, one with a Tudor arched head.	II
Howgill war memorial 54.34940°N 2.56534°W	—	1920	The war memorial is in the churchyard of Holy Trinity Church. It is in stone, and consists of a wheel-head cross on a plinth on a single-step base. The wheel-head is in the form of a laurel wreath, and in the centre is a carved boss. There is an inscription on the shaft, and on the plinth are the names of those lost in the First World War.	II
Sedbergh war memorial 54.32277°N 2.52807°W		1920	The war memorial, designed by Hubert Worthington, is in sandstone, and a consists of a simple cross. The cross has a tapered shaft with stop-chamfered corners, on a square base and a square plinth. There is an inscription on the east face of the base, and on the other faces are limestone tablets inscribed with the names of those lost in the two world wars.	II
War Memorial Cloister, Sedbergh School; 54.32154°N 2.53148°W		1924	The war memorial was designed by Hubert Worthington, and was extended in about 1945–50. It is in sandstone and has a U-shaped plan, consisting of a five bay arcade flanked by short and wide three-bay arcaded wings. All the arches have round heads. The main arcade has moulded imposts, moulded heads with keystones, a continuous inscribed frieze and a plain parapet. Steps lead down to the memorial, and there are panels inscribed with the names of former pupils.	II*
Telephone kiosk near Holy Trinity Church; 54.34942°N 2.56471°W	—	1935	A K6 type telephone kiosk, designed by Giles Gilbert Scott. Constructed in cast iron with a square plan and a dome, it has three unperforated crowns in the top panels.	II
Telephone kiosk near St Andrew's Church; 54.32347°N 2.52846°W	—	1935	A K6 type telephone kiosk, designed by Giles Gilbert Scott. Constructed in cast iron with a square plan and a dome, it has three unperforated crowns in the top panels.	II
