= Holy Trinity Church, Howgill =

Coordinates: 54.3495°N 2.5650°W

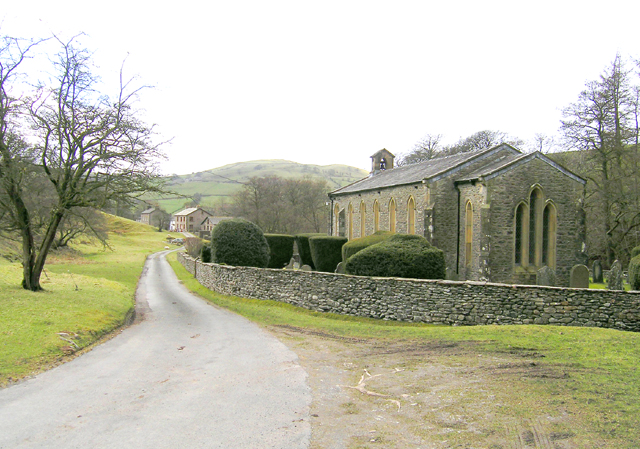

- Location in Cumbria
- OS grid reference: SD 633 950
- Location: Howgill, Cumbria
- Country: England
- Denomination: Anglican
- Website: www.achurchnearyou.com/howgill-holy-trinity

History
- Consecrated: 29 October 1838

Architecture
- Functional status: Active
- Heritage designation: Grade II
- Designated: 14 June 1984
- Architect: Edmund Sharpe
- Architectural type: Church
- Style: Gothic Revival
- Completed: 1838

Specifications
- Materials: Rubble with sandstone dressings and a slate roof

Administration
- Province: York
- Diocese: Anglican Diocese of Carlisle
- Archdeaconry: Westmorland and Furness
- Deanery: Kendal
- Parish: Howgill

Clergy
- Vicar: Revd Andy Burgess (2022–) Revd Andy McMullon (2020)

Holy Trinity Church stands in a country lane near the hamlet of Howgill, between Sedbergh and Tebay, Cumbria, England. It is an active Anglican church in the deanery of Kendal, the archdeaconry of Westmorland and the Anglican Diocese of Carlisle. The church is recorded in the National Heritage List for England as a designated Grade II listed building.

== History ==
The church was built in 1838 to a design by the Lancaster architect Edmund Sharpe. It replaced a small chapel on the other side of Chapel Back that dated back to about 1685. The main person responsible for its creation was Revd Isaac Green, the second master at Sedbergh School, and incumbent of the parish. The land was given by Stephen Sedgwick. The new church was consecrated on 29 October 1838 by the Rt Revd Charles Longley, Bishop of Ripon.

== Architecture ==
Holy Trinity Church has a simple design in Early English style; it is built in rubble with sandstone dressings and has a slate roof. Its plan consists of a nave with a short chancel. The west front is gabled with buttresses at the corners; it contains three windows and a doorway, and above it is a bellcote. On both the north and south sides are six lancet windows, with a buttress between the first and second windows from the west on each side. The chancel is slightly lower than the nave. It has one window on each side, and a triple lancet window at the east end. Internally there is a west gallery, box pews and a panelled font.

== See also ==
- Listed buildings in Sedbergh
- List of architectural works by Edmund Sharpe
