= Charles Woodmason =

18th-century poet and Anglican clergyman

- Church: Church of England
- In office: 1766–1789
- Predecessor: Rev.
- Successor: Rev.

Orders
- Ordination: 1766

Personal details
- Born: before 23 October 1720 probably Gosport, Hampshire, England
- Died: March 1789 Sedbergh Parish, West Riding of Yorkshire, now Cumbria, England buried from St Andrew's Church, Sedbergh on 30 March 1789
- Buried: Unmarked grave in the churchyard of St Andrew's Church, Sedbergh, West Riding of Yorkshire, now Cumbria, England
- Residence: England; South Carolina; Virginia; Maryland
- Spouse: Hannah Page (died 1766)
- Children: Hannah Woodmason (1747–1747); James Woodmason (1748–1831)
- Profession: Planter; Anglican Clergyman; Mercer; Storekeeper

Charles Woodmason (c. 1720 – March 1789) was an author, poet, Anglican clergyman, American loyalist, and west gallery psalmodist. He is best remembered for his journal documenting life on the South Carolina frontier in the late 1760s, and for his role as a leader of the South Carolina Regulator movement.

== Background and early life ==
The son of Benjamin Woodmason, a ship's carpenter, and his second wife, Susanna Pittard, Charles Woodmason was baptized on November 3, 1720 [O.S. 23 October 1720] at Holy Trinity Church of England Chapel, Gosport, Hampshire, England and was evidently a native of that town. Benjamin was from an old Devon family and apparently settled in Gosport after marrying the first time to a local girl. Charles Woodmason's mother died in August 1722 and his father remarried in October 1725. In June 1735, Woodmason completed the seven-year apprenticeship to a Gosport mercer named Thomas Levet. He married Hannah Page in 1745 and they had two children, a daughter and a son. Only his son James Woodmason survived to adulthood. In 1747, he was responsible for the removal of the organ used by George Frederick Handel from the deceased Duke of Chandos' private chapel at Canongate to Holy Trinity, where it still remains in use today. His tune book, A Collection of Psalm Tunes with Basses Fitted for the Voice and Figured for the Organ, for the Use of Gosport in Hampshire, saw its second edition in 1748. Hannah Page Woodmason was buried from St. Mary's Church, Alverstoke in 1766.

== Planter and poet ==
In September 1750, Benjamin Woodmason died. Sometime in 1752, his son left England for America and settled in the colony of South Carolina where he initially prospered as a planter and store proprietor. The South Carolina Gazette issue of 10 August 1752 contains a long list of books "to be sold by Charles Woodmason." This is the earliest mention of his presence in South Carolina. Both his wife and son remained in England. Initially, he prospered as both a merchant and planter. In addition to his mercantile and agricultural pursuits, Woodmason published several poems in The Gentleman's Magazine, One authority on colonial life described him as "South Carolina's brightest literary light".

== Scientific and related research and writings ==
In addition to his mercantile and agricultural pursuits, Woodmason had a scientific bent and is numbered among the parson-naturalists who explored the surrounding world. He wrote a detailed account on the production of indigo in South Carolina, accompanied by drawings of necessary equipment and a prospective budget for starting such an operation, which appeared in May June 1755 issues of The Gentleman's Magazine and then appeared as a book, and composed a poem lauding Benjamin Franklin's recent electricity experiment, which was widely reprinted. Along with the likes of Franklin and Benjamin West as "principal correspondents" (and members) of the Royal Society of Arts, London, writings directed to the Society from these men (and others) were included in a microfilm edition Selected Materials Relating to America, 1754-1806 that the Society published on microfilm in the 1960s. This work continued in the South Carolina backcountry. At one point in his Journal, Woodmason noted

I had last Week Experience of the Velocity and force of the Air—By smelling a Barbicu dressing in the Woods upwards of six Miles—I have made many Remarks and Experiments here both on the State of the Air, and Percussion of Sounds. I can hear a Cannon fir’d from this place, 10 Miles further than any Thunder in the Horizon.

== Missionary in South Carolina ==
After a series of reverses, including a failed attempt to become a distributor under the hated Stamp Act, Woodmason returned to England and was ordained a Church of England minister. On Friday, 25 April 1766, Charles Woodmason was ordained a deacon by John Green, the Bishop of Lincoln, at the Chapel Royal, Whitehall, Westminster. On the following Sunday, Edmund Keene, the Bishop of Chester ordained him as a priest.

Woodmason was assigned to St. Mark's Parish on the South Carolina frontier, assuming his duties in September 1766. The parish had a dispersed and growing population, yet had few roads and even fewer amenities. Woodmason had 26 regular, periodic stops in the parish which he visited anywhere from every other Sunday to once yearly. He also had the option of preaching whenever and wherever he could gather a congregation. In two years, he traveled 6,000 miles. He found very little in backcountry life to his liking. The people lived in open cabins "with hardly a Blanket to cover them, or Cloathing to cover their Nakedness". Their diet consisted of "what in England is given to Hogs and Dogs" and he was forced to live likewise. Most cabins lacked even basic cutlery. At worship, the people used "the barbarous Scotch Version" of the Psalms instead of Isaac Watts'. And that was just the start of his long litany of complaints and criticism.

Woodmason's ministry was most unwelcome by some non-Anglicans in the backcountry. He faced especially great opposition from Presbyterians and Baptists. Both received savage condemnation from him and he did all he could to preserve the privileged position of South Carolina's established Church of England. However, historians have overlooked (or ignored) the fact that in their battle for souls with Woodmason, they gave as good as they got and the abuse may well have reached the epic proportions Woodmason reported. He was especially virulent when it came to the Presbyterians. Not yet published research by Joseph R. Gainey indicates that the only Benjamin Woodmason of the right age to be his father was baptized as an infant by a Presbyterian minister ejected from his Devon parish by the 1662 Act of Uniformity. A 1790 grant of an arms to James Woodmason stated that the family originated not in Gosport but in Devon! This raises the unanswered, and possibly unanswerable, question: Was this due to Benjamin Woodmason's rejection of Presbyterianism and conformity to the Church of England? Benjamin served as the parish clerk for Holy Trinity for nearly thirty years. A case could be made that such service, which required almost daily attendance at baptisms, marriages, and burials, was an exercise in over-conformity.

During this period, Woodmason started his journal which vividly depicted the primitive conditions. It and his related writings (only a fraction of which have been published) constitute the most complete, if highly biased, account of the primitive conditions on the colonial American frontier known to exist. Some of his writings, including the complete text of his journal, were published in 1953 as The Carolina Backcountry on the Eve of the Revolution: The Journal and Other Writings of Charles Woodmason, Anglican Itinerant, edited by Richard J. Hooker. In tone, Woodmason's writing has been compared to that of Jonathan Swift and Laurence Sterne. He authored the Remonstrance for South Carolina's Regulator Movement.

As an Englishman, Woodmason was offended by the growing Revolutionary movement. In the South Carolina Gazette and Country-Journal on 28 March 1769, much to the displeasure of many, an article by him (published under the pseudonym "Sylvanus") chided the Patriot leadership for hypocrisy and asked pointedly how the local political leadership could justly complain of "No taxation without representation!" regarding acts of Parliament, while these very same powerful men denied the Backcountry representation in South Carolina's Assembly, yet, expected them to pay taxes passed by that body. Patriot Christopher Gadsden published a response in a later issue filled with pro-Patriot rhetoric but leaving Woodmason's question unanswered. Woodmason's repose, which was even more sarcastic and biting than even the heavily edited published version of his initial offering, was not published until 1953.

In 1772, Woodmason accepted a parish in Virginia only to find upon his arrival that the vestry in their patriotic zeal had resolved to hire only native-born Americans. Had they read his Sylvanus article, they would have been even less desirous of employing Woodmason. His name appeared on a list of early (pre-1786) Fredericksburg, Virginia Free Masons. Woodmason served as a curate for a parish near Baltimore, Maryland in 1772 and 1773. On 29 May 1774 (the day that the 1662 Book of Common Prayer set aside to commemorate the restoration of the monarchy under Charles II), Rev. Charles Woodmason angered the local Patriots by performing the special liturgy authorized for that occasion, which stresses that those in authority—especially the King—must be obeyed, and read the homily on obedience (the traditional reading for this day), all as the 1662 prayer book's rubrics directed. That act, coupled with his refusal to publish at that service the "Brief for collecting Money for relief of the poor of Boston, (but in fact to purchase Ammunition)" according to Woodmason's 1776 memorial to the Bishop of London, led a local Patriot committee to advise him to "consult his safety". He did so by returning to England.

== Return to England and later life ==
As an American Loyalist refugee, Woodmason faced an uncertain future. From at least February 1776 through December 1777, he served as the curate of St. Michael and All Angels Parish, Dinder, Somerset (less than three miles southeast of Wells). He also preached at nearby churches, Watford (which Watford is unstated), and the parishes of Dedham and Chingford in Essex. Ongoing research will, hopefully, fill in the many unaccounted for time periods of Woodmason's English years.

On 18 January 1782, tragedy struck the Woodmason family. While James Woodmason was at a royal ball at St. James' Palace, he suffered a disastrous fire that destroyed his home and business on Leadenhall Street, City of London, killing all seven of his children. The oldest child was only eight and home from boarding school for a visit. Mary Gavelle Woodmason, James' wife, alone survived. (The children are memorialized by a Francesco Bartolozzi plaque in St Peter upon Cornhill church, Leadenhall Street, City of London. The monument pictures each child individually.) Although two additional sons were born to the couple, the marriage eventually disintegrated. Fortunately, Charles Woodmason did not live long enough to see it end in a messy and very public Doctors' Commons lawsuit against the wife for abandoning her husband and family by returning to live with her father in France, obtaining a French divorce (which the British courts firmly refused to recognize) "on the ground of non-performance of conjugal rights", and committing bigamy by marrying a Parisian named Joseph Antoine Guibert (who, according to press accounts, was very much younger than Mary). Parliament granted James Woodmason a divorce in early 1798. Being, in the eyes of the law, the "innocent" party in this affair, he was free to remarry, which he quickly did. From the early 1790s, James Woodmason spent more time in Dublin, Ireland and settled there by 1794, when the architect James Gandon designed "Emsworth" for him. With his son Mathias, he became involved with banking there. However, he continued to operate his stationery and printing business.

In late March 1789, Woodmason died. Evidently, he was in the parish of Sedbergh (West Riding of Yorkshire, now Cumbria) for he was buried from St. Andrew's Church, in Sedbergh, on Monday, 30 March 1789. His grave in the churchyard is unmarked.

== Descendants ==
A great-grandson, also named Charles Woodmason, along with several other family members, followed their friend John Henry Newman into the Roman Catholic Church. This Charles' brother, James Mathias Woodmason died in Cumbria in 1873. A graduate of St. Bees Theological College, he had served a church near Cockermouth as an Anglican curate for about 25 years. There is no record that either man ever married.

== Works by Woodmason ==
- L. H. Butterfield, ed. A Poetical Epistle to Benjamin Franklin, Esq., of Philadelphia on His Experiments and Discoveries in Electricity. Written at Cooper River, South Carolina, in 1753. Richmond, VA, USA: William Byrd Press, 1954.
- Richard J. Hooker, ed. The Carolina Backcountry on the Eve of the Revolution: The Journal and Other Writings of Charles Woodmason, Anglican Itinerant, 1953. ISBN 978-0-8078-4035-1
- A Collection of Psalm Tunes with Basses fitted for the Voice and Figured for the Organ for the Use of Gosport in Hampshire. London: J. Simpson, [ca. 1748]. OCLC 32832458
- A Letter from a Gentleman of South-Carolina, on the Cultivation of Indico. Charles Town, SC, 1754. OCLC 62080562

== See also ==
- American Loyalists
- St Andrew's Church, Sedbergh
- John Dooly (1740-1780)
- Little Fork Church, a Culpeper County, Virginia parish served by Woodmason

== Sources ==
- Anonymous article. "Woodmason, Charles (c. 1720–post 1774)" in John Mack Faragher (editor). The Encyclopedia of Colonial and Revolutionary America. Da Cappo Press, 1996, p. 462, col. 2. ISBN 978-0-306-80687-2
- Alan Axelrod. "Charles Woodmason" in Dictionary of Literary Biography. Vol. 31: American Colonial Writers, 1735–1781, Emory Elliott (editor). Gale Research Company, 1984. pp. 272–73 ISBN 978-0-8103-1709-3
- Richard Maxwell Brown. The South Carolina Regulators. Belknap Press of Harvard University, 1963.
- Henning Cohen. "Charles Woodmason (c. 1720–c. 1776)" in James A. Levernier and Douglas R. Wilmes (editors). American Writers Before 1800: A Biographical and Critical Dictionary. Greenwood Press, 1983. Vol. 3, pp. 1658–1660 ISBN 978-0-313-23477-4
- John Mack Faragher, ed. see Anonymous article. "Woodmason, Charles (c. 1720-post 1774)" above.
- Joseph R. Gainey. "Rev. Charles Woodmason (c. 1720-1789): Author, Loyalist, Missionary, and Psalmodist." West Gallery: The Newsletter of the West Gallery Music Association (ISSN 0960-4227), Issue No. 59 (Autumn 2011), pp. 18–25. This undocumented article is the first publication to identify Woodmason's parents, background, baptism, marriage, and burial dates and places and contains much previously unavailable information.
- Richard J. Hooker, ed. The Carolina Backcountry on the Eve of the Revolution: The Journal and Other Writings of Charles Woodmason, Anglican Itinerant. 1953. ISBN 978-0-8078-4035-1 The most complete collection of Woodmason's writings available and Hooker's interpretative framework has held up well.
- Claude E. Jones. "Charles Woodmason as a Poet". The South Carolina Historical Magazine, Vol. 59, No. 4 (October 1958), pp. 189–194.
- Whitt Jones. "Charles Woodmason (ca. 1720–ca. 1776)" in Joseph M. Flora, Amber Vogels, and Bryan Giemza (editors). Southern Writers: A New Biographical Dictionary. Louisiana State University Press, 2006. p. 451 ISBN 978-0-8071-3123-7
- John J. Lanier. Washington: The Great American Mason. New York, NY: Macoy Publishing & Masonic Supply Company, 1922.
- W. P. W. Phillimore and A. T. Everitt, eds. Hampshire Parish Registers. Marriages. Vol. X. St. Thomas a(sic.) Becket, Portsmouth, 1653-1700. London: Phillimore & Co., 1907.
- Nicholas Temperley. The Music of the English Parish Church. 2 vols. Cambridge: Cambridge University Press, 1979. 2 vols.
- Nicholas Temperley assisted by Charles G. Manns and Joseph Herl. The Hymn Tune Index: A Census of English Language Hymn Tunes in Printed Sources from 1535 to 1820. 4 vols. Oxford: Clarendon Press, 1998.
- Richard Walsh, ed. The Writings of Christopher Gadsden, 1746-1805. University of South Carolina Press, 1966.
- Arthur T. Winn, M.A. The Registers of The Parish of Sedbergh, Co. York, 1594-1800, Part III.: Burials. Sedbergh, Eng.: Jackson & Son, 1912.
- William Woodfall and assistants. An Impartial Report of the Debates That Occur in the Two Houses of Parliament, In(sic.) the Course of the Second Session of the Eighteenth Parliament of Great Britain, called to meet at Westminster, on Tuesday[,] the 27th of September 1796, London: for the Reporter, 1798.
