= Millthrop =

Hamlet in Cumbria, England

Coordinates: 54.316°N 2.522°W

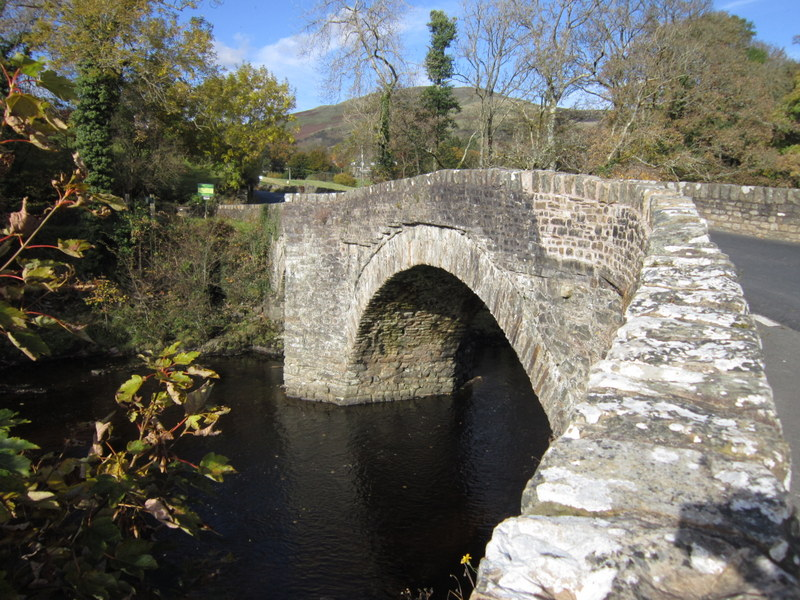
- Millthrop Bridge

- Location in South Lakeland Location within Cumbria
- OS grid reference: SD660912
- Civil parish: Sedbergh
- Unitary authority: Westmorland and Furness
- Ceremonial county: Cumbria
- Region: North West
- Country: England
- Sovereign state: United Kingdom
- Post town: SEDBERGH
- Postcode district: LA10
- Dialling code: 015396
- Police: Cumbria
- Fire: Cumbria
- Ambulance: North West
- UK Parliament: Westmorland and Lonsdale

Millthrop is a hamlet in the Westmorland and Furness district of Cumbria, Northern England and the Yorkshire Dales. Millthrop lies on the south bank of the River Rawthey close to the town of Sedbergh.

== See also ==
- Listed buildings in Sedbergh
