= Baugh Fell =

Large, flat-topped hill in the northern Pennines of England

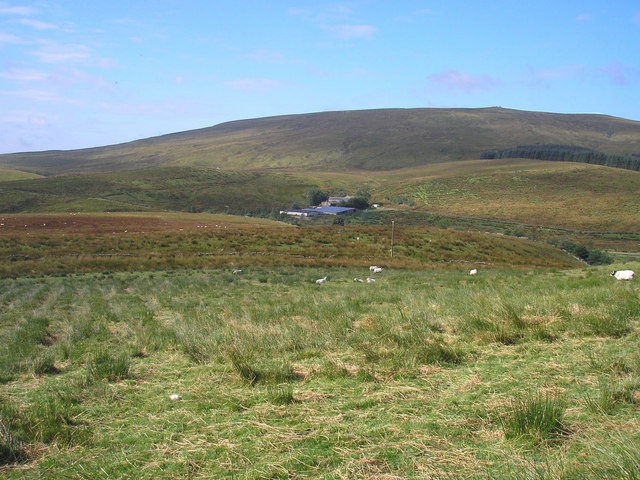
- The slopes of Baugh Fell from Grisedale

Highest point
- Elevation: 678 m (2,224 ft)
- Prominence: c. 260 m
- Parent peak: Wild Boar Fell
- Listing: Marilyn, Hewitt, Nuttall
- Coordinates: 54°19′11″N 2°24′02″W

Geography
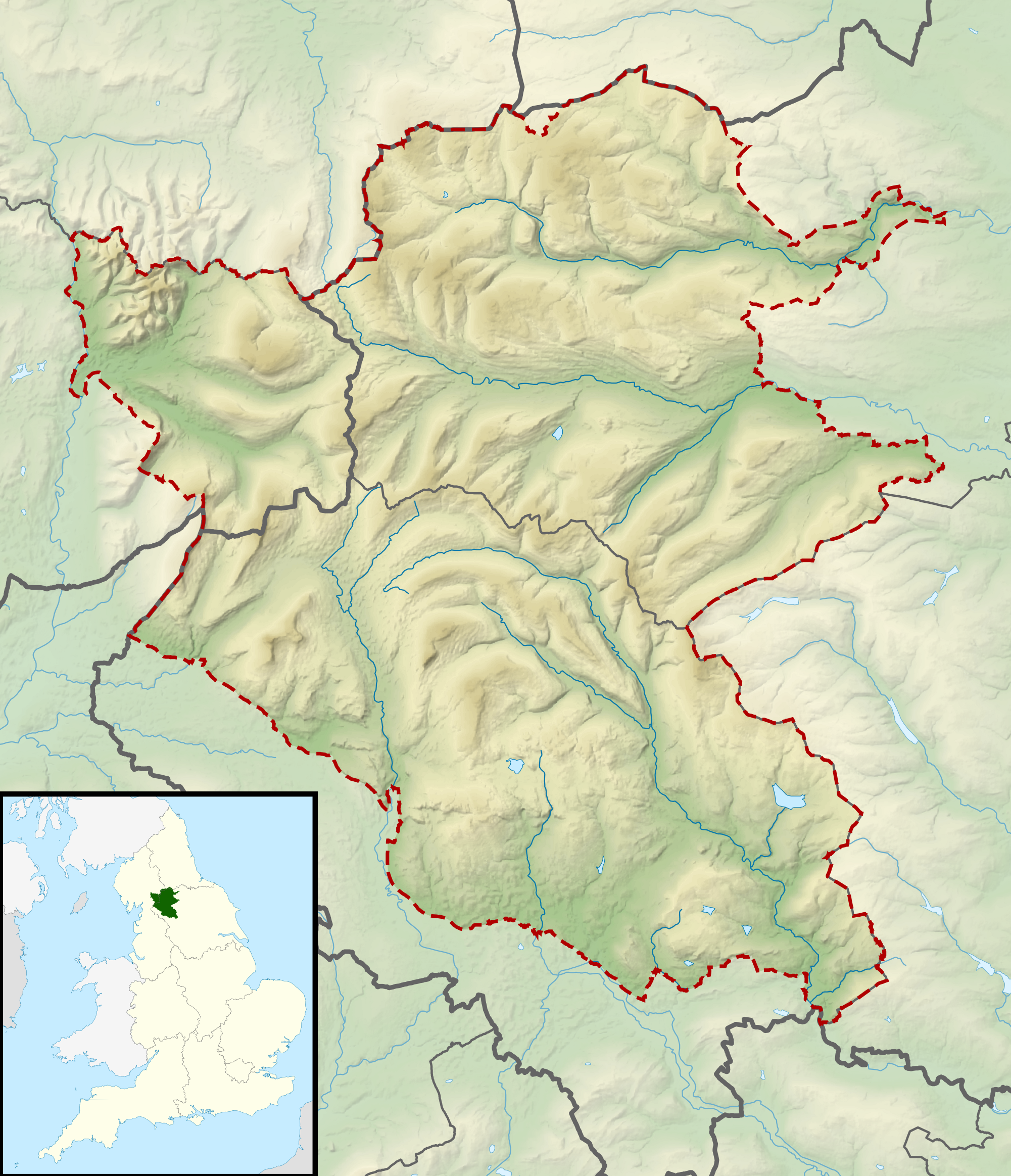
- Location within Yorkshire Dales
- Location: Yorkshire Dales, Cumbria, England
- Parent range: Pennines
- OS grid: SD740916
- Topo map: OS Landranger 98, Explorer OL19

Baugh Fell (/boʊˈfɛl/, /bɔːˈfɛl/ or locally /ˈbɑːfl/) is a large, flat-topped hill in the northern Pennines of England. It lies in the north-western corner of the Yorkshire Dales National Park, immediately to the east of the Howgill Fells and to the north of Whernside, the highest of the Yorkshire Three Peaks. Formerly in the West Riding of Yorkshire, since 1974 it has been part of the county of Cumbria.

== Topography ==
Baugh Fell is bounded by Garsdale to the south and by the valley of the River Rawthey to the west; on the north-eastern side it adjoins Swarth Fell and Wild Boar Fell. The fell sprawls over a wide area, roughly 45 square kilometres (17 sq mi) in size, with generally steep slopes on the Garsdale side and gentler slopes to the west. The Rawthey rises high up on the summit plateau and initially flows north through Rawthey Gill, before turning south to form the hill's western boundary. The eastern limit of the fell is marked by Grisedale Beck, the main tributary of the River Clough which flows through Garsdale.

The summit plateau is L-shaped, incised in the middle by Rawthey Gill, and measures some 4 km (2.5 mi) from end to end. The rock of the plateau is millstone grit, with sandstone and limestone on the flanks, and the Dent Fault ends on the western slope. The highest point at Tarn Rigg Hill (678 m) is in enclosed ground (now with open access), but the trig point on Knoutberry Haw (grid reference SD731919) is only two metres lower and provides excellent views of the Three Peaks, the Howgill Fells, the Lake District and surrounding countryside as far as Blackpool Tower on a clear day. Better views down Wensleydale and the Eden valley may be obtained from Grisedale Pike (SD756925), a slight projection on the eastern flank of Baugh Fell just over a mile from the summit.

There are five small lakes or tarns, called the East Tarns, grouped together on the eastern part of the plateau just to the north of the summit of Tarn Rigg Hill. The West Tarn, meanwhile, lies at the north-western end of the summit plateau at SD730937, and is difficult to find on the almost flat top because it nestles in a slight hollow, even though it can be seen from the trig point. It may be located from the latter by following the western rim of the plateau, overlooking Sedbergh, until two cairns point the way to the tarn.

== Access and routes ==
Although there are no public rights of way to the summit of Baugh Fell, most of the fell is uncultivated moorland and as such is designated as access land under the Countryside and Rights of Way Act 2000, allowing walkers freedom to roam. There are several bridleways giving access to the open fell from the Rawthey valley to the west, while a public footpath from Uldale to Grisedale forms the northern limit of Baugh Fell. There is also open access from Garsdale Foot and West Hind Keld on the south-western slopes, from Grisedale on the north-eastern slopes, and from parts of Fell End on the north-western slopes. There is no public access from Garsdale, though some landowners might allow walkers to pass through cultivated land with permission. From the east the Grisedale road give access to the moor near Riggs giving an easy to follow route up to the trig point by simply following the wall. Once on the open fell there are no established routes to the summit, since the slopes are mostly gentle. Baugh Fell does not share the popularity of the nearby Lake District or the Yorkshire Three Peaks, and even on bank holiday weekends it is mostly unfrequented.
