= Sedbergh School Chapel =

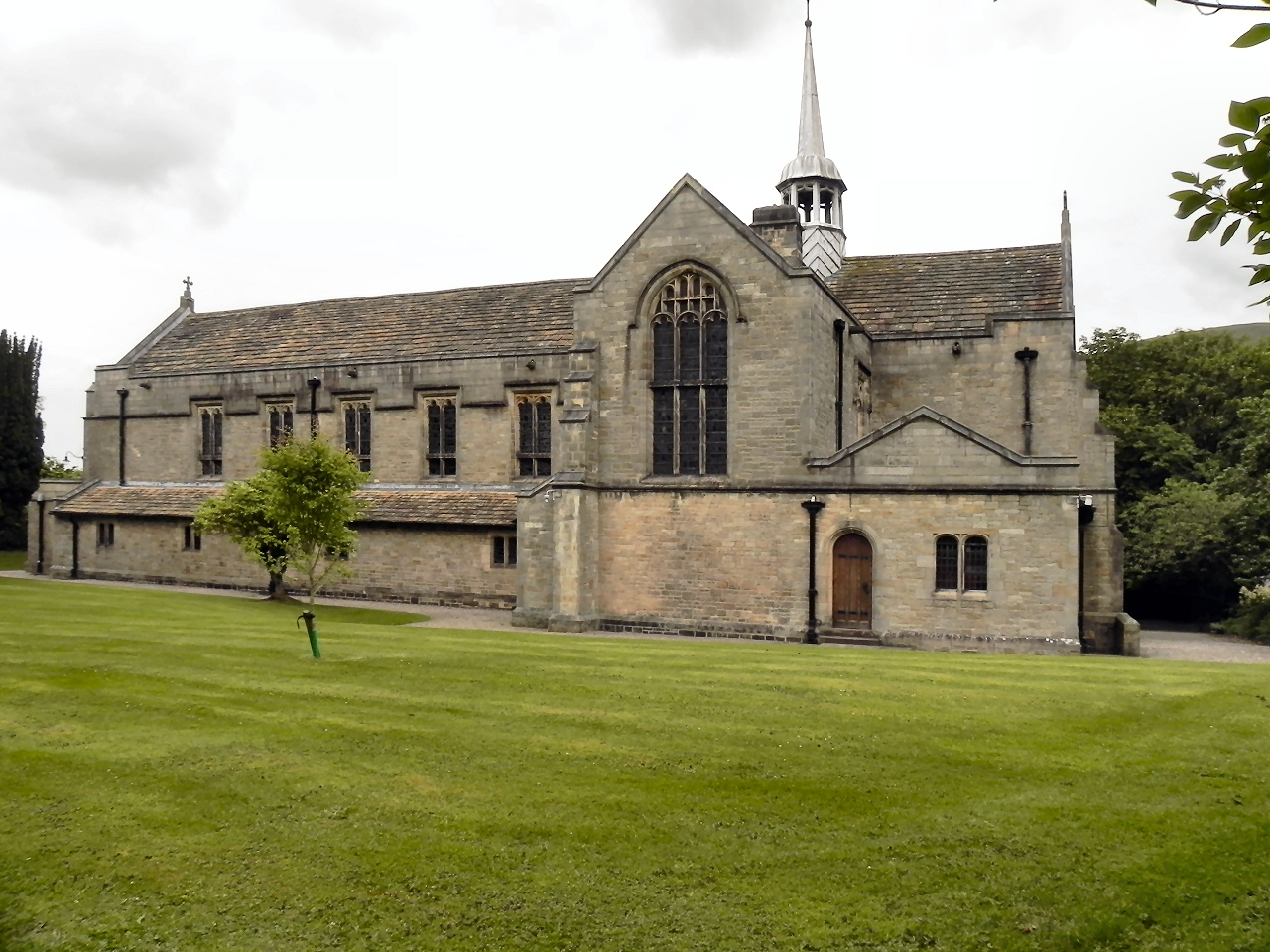

- Location in South Lakeland Location in Cumbria
- 54.3204°N 2.5272°W
- Location: Sedbergh, Cumbria, England
- OS grid reference: SD 658 918

Site notes
- Architect: Austin and Paley
- Architectural style: Gothic Revival
- Governing body: Sedbergh School

Listed Building – Grade II*
- Reference no.: 1384171

Sedbergh School Chapel is located to the southeast of Sedbergh School, Sedbergh, Cumbria, England. It is considered to be of architectural importance and is recorded in the National Heritage List for England as a designated Grade II* listed building. (Note: Grade II* is the middle of the three categories of grading and is applied to buildings that are "particularly important buildings of more than special interest".)

== History ==
In 1890 a temporary wooden chapel was built to replace an earlier chapel serving the school, but this was badly damaged by wind in 1893. The Lancaster architects Austin and Paley were commissioned to design a new chapel. This was built in 1895–97 at a cost of £7,827 (equivalent to £880,000 as of 2025).

== Architecture ==
The chapel is constructed in yellow sandstone with stone slate roofs. Its architectural style is Perpendicular. The church has a cruciform plan, with a nave and chancel under one roof, north and south transepts, and a north porch. There are north and south aisles, which are narrow and low, forming passages down the side of the church, and creating a tall clerestory. At the crossing is a large octagonal flèche. In the chancel are a sedilia, a piscina, and a carved reredos. The windows contain stained glass by Kempe. The two-manual pipe organ was made by Nigel Church, and was previously in St Mary Magdalene's Church, Hucknall, Nottinghamshire, and was installed in the chapel in 1994 by David Wells of Liverpool. It replaced a three-manual organ made in 1897 by Norman Brothers and Beard, which had been rebuilt in about 1954 by Wilkinson and Son of Kendal.

== See also ==
- Grade II* listed buildings in Westmorland and Furness
- Listed buildings in Sedbergh
- List of ecclesiastical works by Austin and Paley (1895–1916)
