= Grisedale =

Dale in Cumbria, England

Coordinates: 54.334°N 2.345°W

- Dale
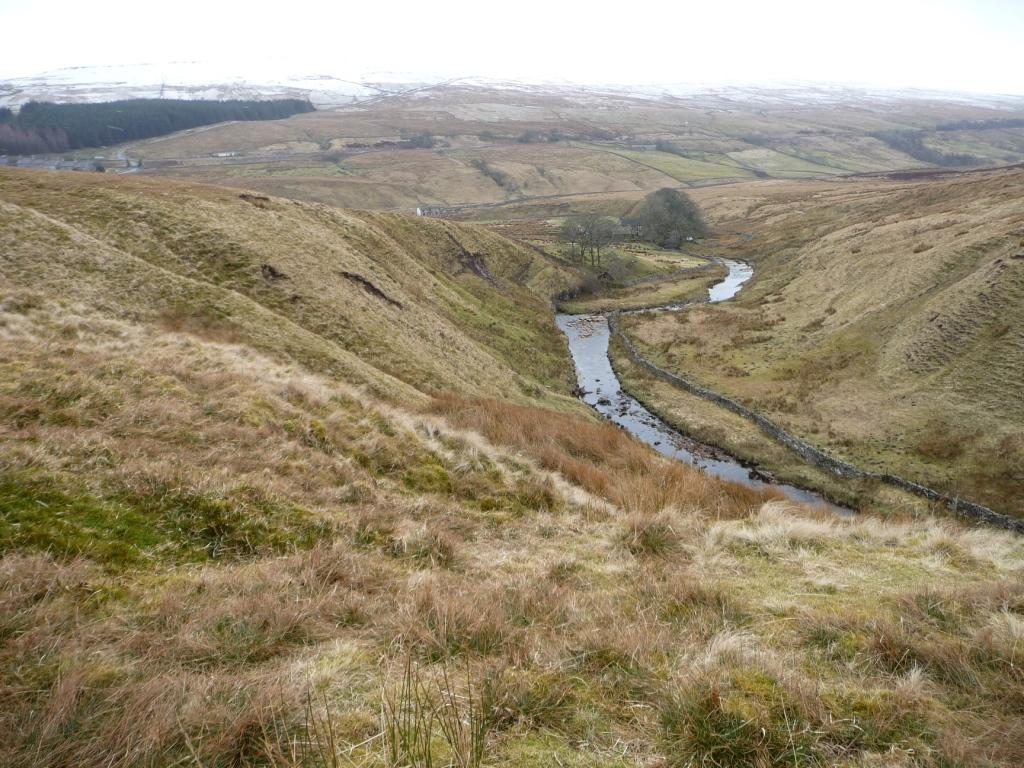
- Grisedale Beck, looking east towards Garsdale

- Location within Cumbria
- OS grid reference: SD776931
- Civil parish: Garsdale; Hawes
- Unitary authority: Westmorland and Furness; North Yorkshire
- Ceremonial county: Cumbria; North Yorkshire
- Region: North West; Yorkshire and the Humber
- Country: England
- Sovereign state: United Kingdom
- Police: Cumbria
- Fire: Cumbria
- Ambulance: North West
- UK Parliament: Westmorland and Lonsdale

Grisedale (sometimes Grisdale, or Grizedale [archaic]) is a south east facing Dale in Cumbria, England, 8 miles (13 km) east of Sedbergh, and 7 miles (11 km) west of Hawes. Grisedale Beck, which drains Baugh Fell, flows down the dale eastwards, and on reaching the valley floor at Garsdale, forms the River Clough before turning westwards towards the Irish Sea. A small part of the north-eastern side of the dale is in North Yorkshire, however, until 1974, all of the area around, and including Grisedale, was part of the West Riding of Yorkshire. The dale was largely depopulated of its working farmers during the 20th century, however, some of the houses have been re-occupied by non-agricultural inhabitants.

The subject of the farm workers moving out prompted Yorkshire Television to commission a film about the last farmer in the dale (The Dale that Died), with its director, Barry Cockcroft, remarking that Grisedale was "the most romantic dale in all of Yorkshire."

== History ==
Grisedale is a south-east facing Dale in Cumbria, but part of the Yorkshire Dales National Park. It is between 2–3 miles (3–5 km) long, sandwiched between Baugh Fell to the south-west, Holmes Moss to the west, Swarth Fell Pike to the north, and White Birks Common to the east. Grisedale Beck rises on the east side of Baugh Fell (2,216 feet (675 m)), and flows south-eastwards through Grisedale, over Clough waterfall, before becoming the River Clough in Garsdale at SD715817, then turning westwards to head to the Irish Sea. In ancient times, the beck joined the valley floor farther west at Hard Ing Bridge (SD781915), but the pre-glacial valley was blocked by boulder clay, so the waters formed a new meander over Clough Waterfall. In its lower reaches before it flows under the A684 road, Grisedale beck cuts through an incised valley created by melting glacial waters. The riverbed also has fossils in its bedrock just upstream of Clough Waterfall. Attempts have been made to mine coal in the north-eastern side of the dale near Grisedale Common. A small seam was worked some 25 feet (7.6 m) below the main limestone beds, but with little success. The bedrock of the dale is composed of the Yoredale Series limestones, with the surrounding hills being Millstone Grit.

Farming in the dale has been known to be challenging due to the wet, waterlogged earth, and the upland nature of the dale (all of its fields are 1,150 feet (350 m) above sea level). Even though 14-16 families lived spread out across Grisedale at the turn of the 20th century, the hardships of the 1930s and severe snow falls in 1947, caused many families to leave, with only two houses in the dale populated by the mid-1960s. By the early 1970s, only one farmer remained living and working in the valley, and he was featured in a Yorkshire Television documentary entitled The Dale that Died. The director of the documentary, Barry Cockcroft, said that Grisedale was "the most romantic dale in all of Yorkshire...complete in its unspoilt beauty, serenity and vivid history." However, in 2019, The Yorkshire Post visited the area and found that most homes had been renovated and had people living in them. Some farms remained desolate, but at least one farmer was living in and working the Dale. It has been noted as one of the least visited dales in the national park.

Historically, the dale was part of the Chapelry of Garsdale, in the Parish of Sedbergh, which was part of Ewecross Wapentake in the West Riding of Yorkshire. Grisedale is 8 miles (13 km) east of Sedbergh, and 7 miles (11 km) west of Hawes. The census returns for the years between 1841 and 1881 show that the dale had 709 people living there in 1841, 87 in 1851, 68 in 1861, 71 in 1871, and 80 in 1881. Whilst the majority of the dale is within Cumbria, a small portion of the north-eastern side is in North Yorkshire, with long-standing descriptions of the dale's location being "sandwiched between Baugh Fell and White Birks Common."

The name of the dale derives from an Old Norse term for pigs; grice and dalr. Dunham and Speight assert that this refers to wild boars, but others state young pigs, perhaps in a farmed sense. (Note: Similarly, the name of Wild Boar Fell, just to the north of Grisedale, is said to be named after wild pigs.) The name of the dale was first documented in the 13th century, and has been recorded variously as Grizedale, Grisdale, and in 1640 as Grysdale. In 1225, most of the land in the dale belonged to Jervaulx Abbey, with the rest apportioned to Easby Abbey. The land of Grisedale and Garsdale is believed to have been gifted to the respective abbeys by Roger de Mowbray, provided that the Abbey of St Agatha (Easby) provided a priest and a Chapel to work out of. A document from the time of the Dissolution states that Jervaulx owned lands at Clough in Sedberglic, Grisendene, Grisedale, Sudeberge, and Ulnedale.

Some of the earliest deeds to cover the valley date from the 1580s when Lord Wharton issued deeds to the tenant farmers in Grisedale. A Methodist chapel was built in the dale in 1889, and despite several of the old farmhouses being derelict, some have been brought back into use as private dwellings whose occupants do not farm in the dale. There are five listed buildings in the dale: the bridge over Grisedale Beck, East Scale Farmhouse, Fea Fow Farmhouse, Reachey Farmhouse and West Scale Farmhouse, all of which are registered as being in Grisdale with Historic England.

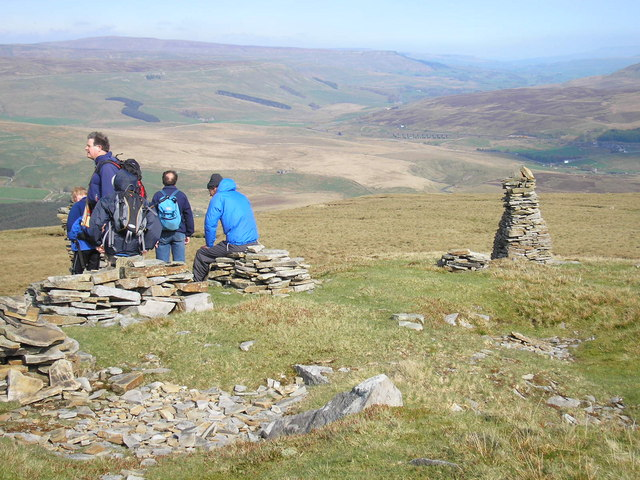
Grisedale Pike looking east. Dandry Mire Viaduct can be seen in the distance

Walking is popular in the dale over Baugh Fell to Sedbergh, north-west to Uldale, and across Swarth Fell to Wild Boar Fell. Prior to the open access laws introduced from 2000 onwards, the dale did not possess any rights of way. There is an unclassified road the penetrates the dale from the A684, but this peters out around the uppermost farmsteads in the valley. However, the track used to go between the ranges to Uldale, where an inn was built in 1828, in anticipation that the track would be improved for travellers. The long-distance footpath Pennine Journey runs across Grisedale, and access can also be found from the North Yorkshire side of the dale at Lunds, via a small bridge over the Settle Carlisle Railway. (Note: The adjacent vehicle crossing is listed on railway mapping as Grisedale user-worked crossing.)

Grisedale, Grisedale Beck, and Grisedale Pike in the Lake District, are spelled exactly the same as the places within Grisedale near Garsdale. All of these places are now in Cumbria, with Grisedale valley next to Garsdale in South Lakeland. Grisedale Pike is 2,030 feet (620 m) high, and has several cairns on its flank, which provide a viewpoint across to Upper Wensleydale. Whilst historically, cairns such as those on Grisedale Pike were markers for shepherds, they are near to the point where sandstone was quarried on Baugh Fell from 1690 to provide roofing materials for the farmhouses in the dale. Previous to this, most of the houses had thatched roofs.

Most of Grisedale is within the civil parish of Garsdale, and is represented at Westminster as part of the Westmorland and Lonsdale Constituency. Parts of the dale, notably Grisedale Common, are just within the civil parish of Hawes.

=== Religious history ===
Many of the families within the dale were Quakers before the arrival of Methodism, and George Fox, the founder of the Religious Society of Friends (Quakers), visited the dale in 1652. Fox's own journal records that

..[I] came to major Bousfield's in Garsdale, where he and several more received me and some were convinced and still stand to this day. And I passed through Grisedale and several of those other dales and some were convinced.

Previous to this, the tenant farmers in the dale were tied to the Anglican church of St John the Baptist in Garsdale, with many donating money from their wills to the vicar at St Johns. Initially, in 1703, a joint meeting house at Raygill (SD767902) was built for the benefit of those from Garsdale and Grisedale. This place was located on the Clough Valley floor between the two settlements, but by 1706, the inhabitants of Grisedale had built their own house in the dale (at SD775934).

West Scale is near to the location of the Quaker burial ground, though its exact spot is unknown. The Quaker meeting house was built near to Reachey Farmhouse in 1706, and was closed as a place of meeting by 1870. It was destroyed by severe flooding in the dale in August 1889, (Note: Grisedale Beck was swollen by very heavy rainfall on either 7, or 8 August 1889. Thompson maintains the flooding occurred on 8 August, the Meteorological Office's own British Rainfall account for 1889 states that 4 inches (100 mm) of rain fell in under three hours at Hawes Junction (Garsdale railway station) on 7 August 1889. Whilst the flooding caused some damage within Grisedale itself, the resultant flood on the valley floor in Garsdale caused £4,000 worth (equivalent to £444,000 in 2025) of damage.) but Quakerism continued in Grisedale until 1900.
