= St Andrew's Church, Sedbergh =

St Andrew's Church
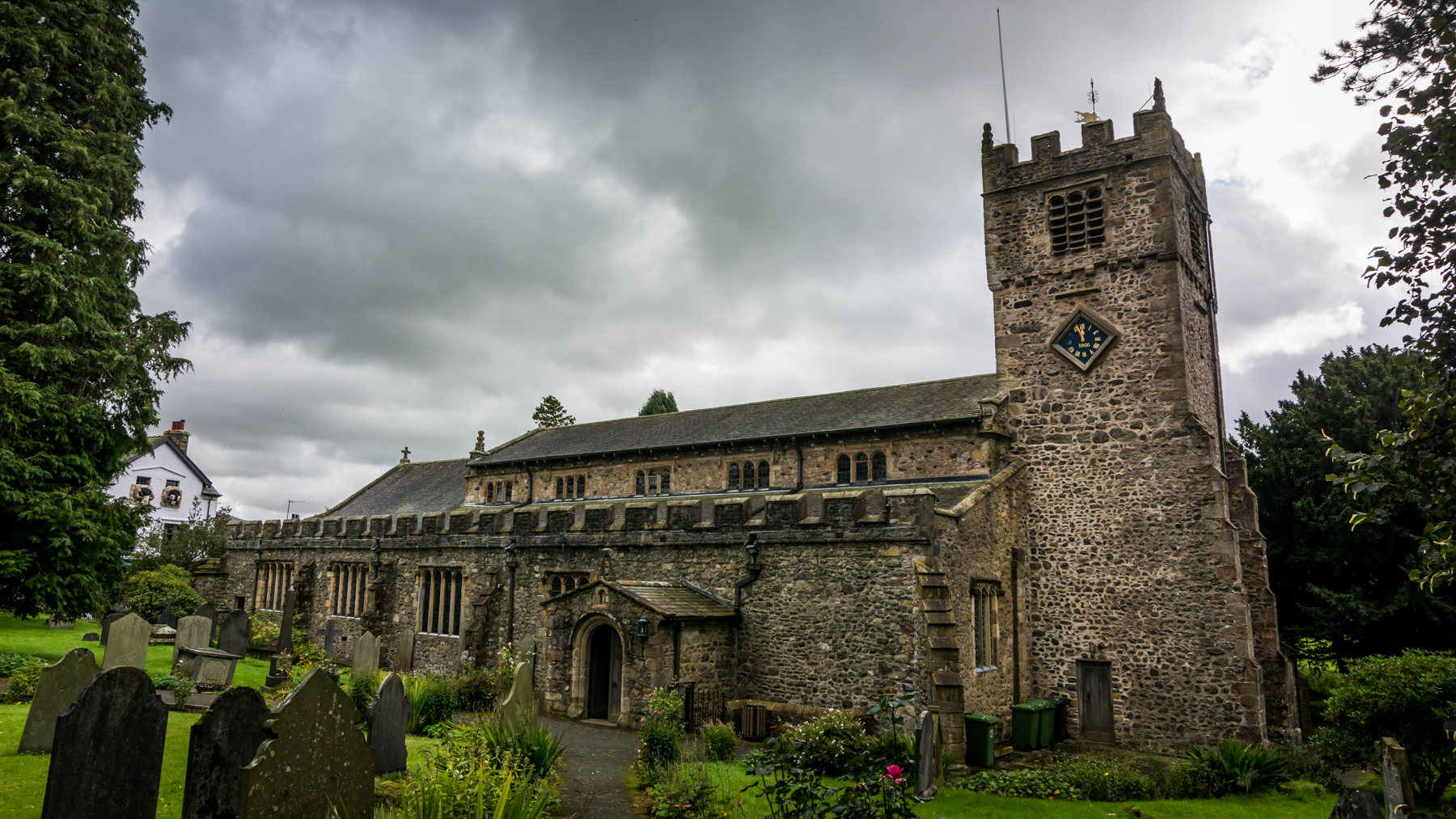
- St Andrew's Church from the north

- Location in South Lakeland Location in Cumbria
- 54.3231°N 2.5285°W
- OS grid reference: SD 657921
- Location: Sedbergh, Cumbria
- Country: England
- Denomination: Anglican
- Website: St Andrew, Sedbergh

History
- Status: Parish church
- Dedication: Saint Andrew

Architecture
- Functional status: Active
- Heritage designation: Grade I
- Designated: 16 March 1964
- Architect: Paley and Austin (restoration)
- Architectural type: Church
- Style: Norman, Gothic

Specifications
- Materials: Rubble with sandstone dressings Green slate roofs

Administration
- Province: York
- Diocese: Carlisle
- Deanery: Kendal
- Parish: Sedbergh, Cautley and Garsdale

Clergy
- Vicar: Revd Andy Burgess (2022 -) Revd Andy McMullon (2013 - 2020)

St Andrew's Church is in Main Street, Sedbergh, Cumbria, England. It is an active Anglican parish church in the deanery of Kendal, and the diocese of Carlisle. Its benefice is united with those of St Mark, Cautley, and St John the Baptist, Garsdale, to form the benefice of Sedbergh, Cautley and Garsdale.The Parish is also part of the Western Dales Mission Community. The church is recorded in the National Heritage List for England as a designated Grade I listed building.

== History ==
The present church dates mainly from about 1500, but fabric from earlier churches has been incorporated. A major restoration was carried out in 1885–86 by the Lancaster architects Paley and Austin. This included rebuilding the south aisle, its arcade and parts of the walling, lowering the floor, and removing the gallery. A new pulpit, altar and altar rails were added, which were made by Gillow. The restoration and the additions cost £4,200.

== Architecture ==
=== Exterior ===
St Andrew's is constructed in rubble stone with sandstone quoins and dressings; it has a green slate roof. Its plan consists of a five-bay nave with a clerestory and a porch, a north aisle with a vestry at the east end, a south aisle with a chapel at the south end and a porch, a chancel, and a west tower. The tower is in three stages, with the top stage slightly corbelled out. At the summit is an embattled parapet with pinnacles at the corners. It has buttresses on the west side, a three-light west window, and three-light louvred bell openings. Along both sides of the clerestory are five three-light windows. The aisles have embattled parapets and four-light windows. The south porch is gabled with a niche above the entrance, and a coped parapet. In the wall of the south chapel is a priest's door with a sundial above it, and a three-light window. The north porch is smaller than the south, and is also gabled. It has a round-headed entrance, above which is a small niche containing a statue, and a large carved stone finial. The inner doorway is also round-headed, and is said to be Norman. At the northeast corner of the north aisle is a flying buttress. The east end contains three windows; the vestry and chancel windows have three lights, and the chapel window has four lights.

=== Interior ===
The two arcades differ, the south arcade having six bays, and the north arcade eight bays. Most of the piers are cylindrical, and most of the arches are round-headed. The church contains wall memorials, and a 19th-century pulpit with a restored 18th-century sounding board. The two-manual organ was built in 1895 by Norman Brothers and Beard, and repaired and overhauled in 1986 by Rushworth and Dreaper of Liverpool. There is a ring of eight bells, all cast in 1897 by John Taylor and Company of Loughborough.

== External features ==
The churchyard is said to contain a yew tree under which George Fox preached and contains the unmarked grave of poet, American loyalist and Anglican missionary to colonial South Carolina, Revd. Charles Woodmason (ca. 1720–1789).

== See also ==
- Grade I listed churches in Cumbria
- Listed buildings in Sedbergh
- List of works by Paley, Austin and Paley
