= Settlebeck School =

Location
- Long Lane; Sedbergh; Cumbria, LA10 5AL; England
- Coordinates: 54.32257°N 2.52012°W

Information
- Type: Academy
- Local authority: Westmorland and Furness
- Department for Education URN: 137269 Tables
- Ofsted: Reports
- Headteacher: Sarah Campbell
- Gender: Coeducational
- Age: 11 to 16
- Website: http://settlebeck.org/

Settlebeck School is a small coeducational secondary school with academy status. It is located in Sedbergh in the English county of Cumbria, drawing pupils from a radius of at least of ten miles, and a total number on roll of about 160.

Previously a community school (Settlebeck High School) administered by Cumbria County Council, Settlebeck School converted to academy status on 1 August 2011. The school continues to coordinate with Cumbria County Council for admissions.

Settlebeck High School offers GCSEs and ASDAN qualifications as programmes of study for pupils. The school also has a provision of vocational courses offered in conjunction with Kendal College.

Settlebeck School is not to be confused with Sedbergh School which is a nearby independent boarding institution.
