= St Gregory's Church, Vale of Lune =

Coordinates: 54.3240°N 2.5638°W

St Gregory's Church
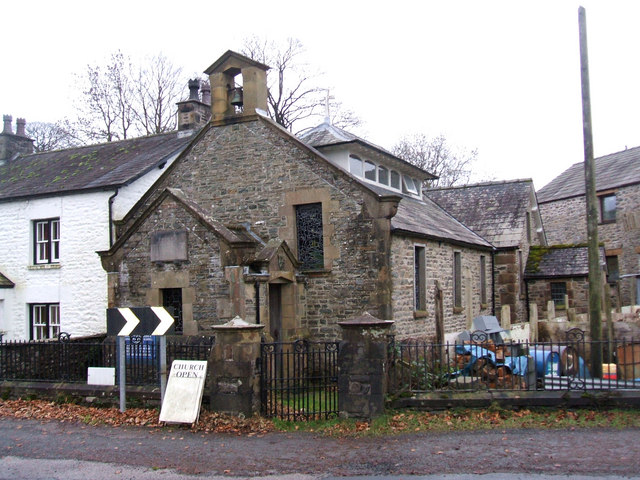
- St Gregory's Church

- Location in South Lakeland Location in Cumbria
- OS grid reference: SD 63425 92194
- Location: Near Sedbergh, Cumbria
- Country: England
- Denomination: Anglican
- Website: Churches Conservation Trust

History
- Founded: 1860s
- Founder: Upton family of Ingmire Hall

Architecture
- Functional status: Redundant
- Heritage designation: Grade II
- Designated: 15 March 1983
- Architectural type: Church
- Completed: 1900s

Specifications
- Materials: Mixed rubble with sandstone dressings, slate roof

St Gregory's Church, Vale of Lune, also known as the Vale of Lune Chapel, is a redundant Anglican church situated on the A684 road about 1.5 miles (2 km) to the west of Sedbergh, Cumbria, England. It is recorded in the National Heritage List for England as a designated Grade II listed building, and is under the care of the Churches Conservation Trust.

== History ==
St Gregory's was built by the Upton family of Ingmire Hall in the 1860s. The London and North Western Railway was at that time constructing the Ingleton Branch Line, and the company sent a scripture reader to minister to the navvies building the railway. The church was altered and enlarged in the 1900s; this included the installation of stained glass windows and the addition of a porch. It continued as the chapel to the Ingmire Estate until 1918. St Gregory's was declared redundant on 1 May 1984, and was vested in the Trust on 16 March 1992.

== Architecture ==
The church is attached to a cottage. It is constructed in random rubble mixed stone with red sandstone quoins and a slate roof. The porch is built in rubble with yellow sandstone dressings and quoins. The roof is in slate, and on it stands a long wooden lantern, glazed with five lights and with a hip roof. The plan of the church consists of a nave on a north–south axis, with a porch on the north, and a chancel acting as a cross-wing on the south. On the north gable is a single bellcote containing a bell. The doorway to the porch is on the west side, over which is a small gable containing the Ingmire Hall cross. On the north side of the porch is a small rectangular window, over which is a memorial plaque. On the west side of the church are three single-light windows. There are no windows on its east side adjoining the cottage.

Inside the church are wooden fittings and furniture by Waring & Gillow of Lancaster. The stained glass in the windows was designed by Frederick George Simon, and depicts images from nature, including river scenes, trees, plants, and birds and animals found in the locality.

== See also ==
- List of churches preserved by the Churches Conservation Trust in Northern England
- Listed buildings in Sedbergh
