= Ingmire Hall =

16th-century house in England

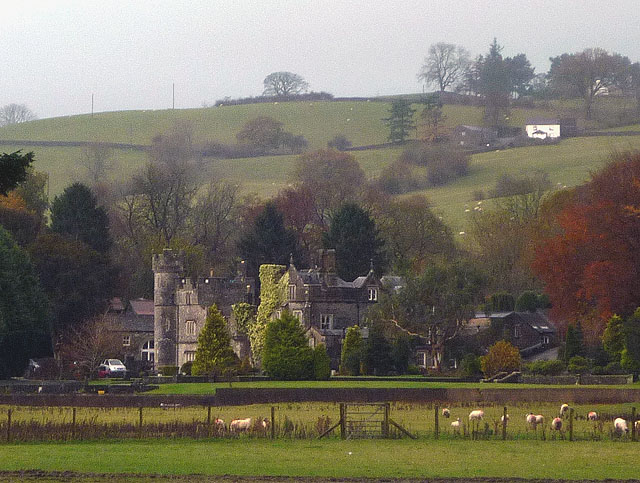
- Ingmire Hall, from the south

- Location in South Lakeland Location in Cumbria

General information
- Location: Sedbergh, Cumbria, England
- Coordinates: 54.320786°N 2.559141°W
- Construction started: 16th century
- Completed: 1989
- Client: Upton Family

Design and construction
- Architect: George Webster 19th century [Extended]

Ingmire Hall is a grade II listed 16th-century country house some 2 miles west of Sedbergh, Cumbria, England. It dates mainly from the 16th century and includes a pele tower. The house was first erected for the Upton family. The house was expanded in the Victorian era, by a local architect, George Webster, and further extended in the 20th century. A fire in the 1920s caused major damage but the 1980s saw restoration work on the house. It is constructed of rubble stone, with a slate roof. The hall is privately owned but a public footpath follows the drive.

The Ingmire estate was acquired by Roger Upton in the late 16th century, who left it to his son John Upton, MP for Preston, 1667–81. The property eventually descended in the female line to John Upton, MP for Westmorland, 1761-68. It then descended further in the Upton family until it was acquired by Sir John Sutherland Harmood-Banner, High Sheriff of Cheshire (1902), Lord Mayor of Liverpool (1912) and MP for Liverpool Everton for 20 years. After his death in 1927 the hall was gutted by fire but was afterwards restored.

== Upton family ==
The Upton family founded St Gregory's Church near Sedbergh which was constructed in the 1860s. The family owned much of the land in Sedbergh and the local area.
