= Clough River =

River in Cumbria, England

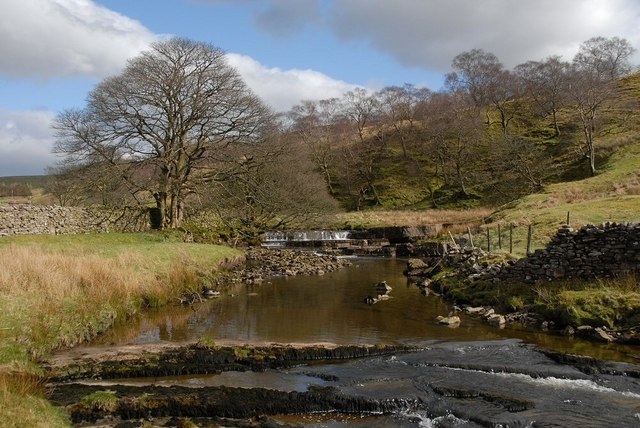
- Waterfalls near Garsdale Head

- Location of the mouth within Cumbria

Location
- Country: England
- Region: North West England
- County: Cumbria

Physical characteristics
- Source: Grisedale Beck
  - location: Clough Farm, Garsdale
  - coordinates: 54°19.492′N 2°20.126′W
- Mouth: Confluence with River Rawthey
  - coordinates: 54.324418°N 2.499167°W
- Length: 21.8 km (13.5 mi)

The Clough River is a river in Cumbria, England. A tributary of the River Rawthey, it flows for 21.8 kilometres (13.5 mi) primarily through the Garsdale valley.

== Course ==
The river rises at Grisedale in south-eastern Cumbria, where a group of smaller streams draining Grisedale Pike converge as Grisedale Beck. The young Clough River then goes through a short valley (Grisedale, "The Dale That Died"), and over a waterfall before being named Clough at Clough Farm, Garsdale Head, where it enters Garsdale, a valley formed by the river between Baugh Fell (to the north) and Rise Hill (to the south).

The Clough is mainly shallow and rocky, with occasional pools large enough for swimming, though the water is always cold. The A684 (Northallerton to Kendal) road follows the river for seven miles with frequent bridges in the upper part of the dale. At Longstone Fell the main (former turnpike) road rises to a well-known view-point looking over the Howgill Fells, and the river descends to Danny Bridge, the site of a seventeenth-century mill on the “old road”, before merging with the River Rawthey at Dowbiggin Foot near Sedbergh, and joining the River Lune at Middleton Bridge. In 1985 a geological walk, the Sedgwick Trail, named after the well-known geologist Adam Sedgwick (1785-1873), was opened. It runs along the Clough from Danny Bridge and highlights rock features along the Dent Fault.

The ancient county through which the Clough River runs is the West Riding of Yorkshire, and it is still part of the Yorkshire Dales National Park, though its entire length is now within the Westmorland and Furness district of Cumbria.

== See also ==
- List of rivers of England
