= River Rawthey =

River in Cumbria, England

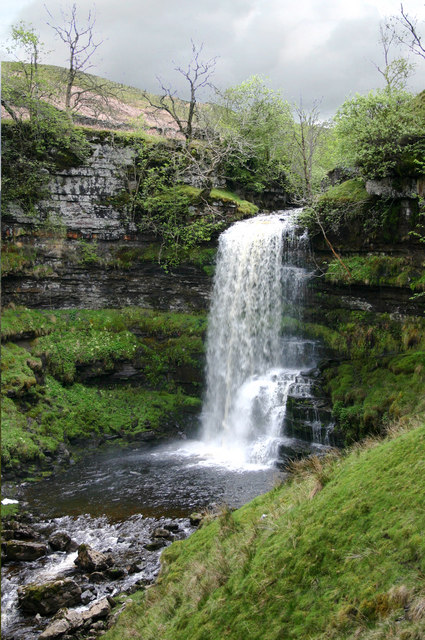
- Uldale Force on the Rawthey

Location
- Country: United Kingdom
- Part: England
- County: Cumbria

Physical characteristics
- Source confluence
  - location: Rawthey Gill Foot
  - coordinates: 54°20.724′N 2°23.483′W
- Mouth: Confluence with River Lune
  - coordinates: 54°18.026′N 2°34.332′W

The River Rawthey is a river in Cumbria in northwest England.

The headwaters of the Rawthey are at Rawthey Gill Foot, where Rawthey Gill meets Haskhaw Gill. The source of Rawthey Gill is unclear, but is either on Knoutberry Haw or near to the East Tarns of Baugh Fell. Moving initially northwards, the Rawthey picks up Whin Stone Gill in Uldale before skirting round Bluecaster, after which the river runs south-southwest through Cautley. The Rawthey is joined by the Clough River, coming from Garsdale, near Dowbiggin, and, having run past Castleshaw Tower, it picks up the River Dee close to Sedbergh. The Rawthey joins the Lune at Stangerthwaite soon afterwards.

Most of the country through which the Rawthey runs is part of the historic West Riding of Yorkshire.

The Environment Agency list the Rawthey and its tributaries as covering a distance of 50 kilometres (31 mi), and having a catchment area of over 78 square kilometres (30 sq mi).

The Rawthey is associated with two waterfalls; Uldale Force, which has a 15 metres (49 ft) drop and is on the river, and Cautley Spout, which has a drop of 198 metres (650 ft), and is on a tributary of the Rawthey.
