= Sedbergh =

Town in Cumbria, England

Coordinates: 54.322°N 2.526°W

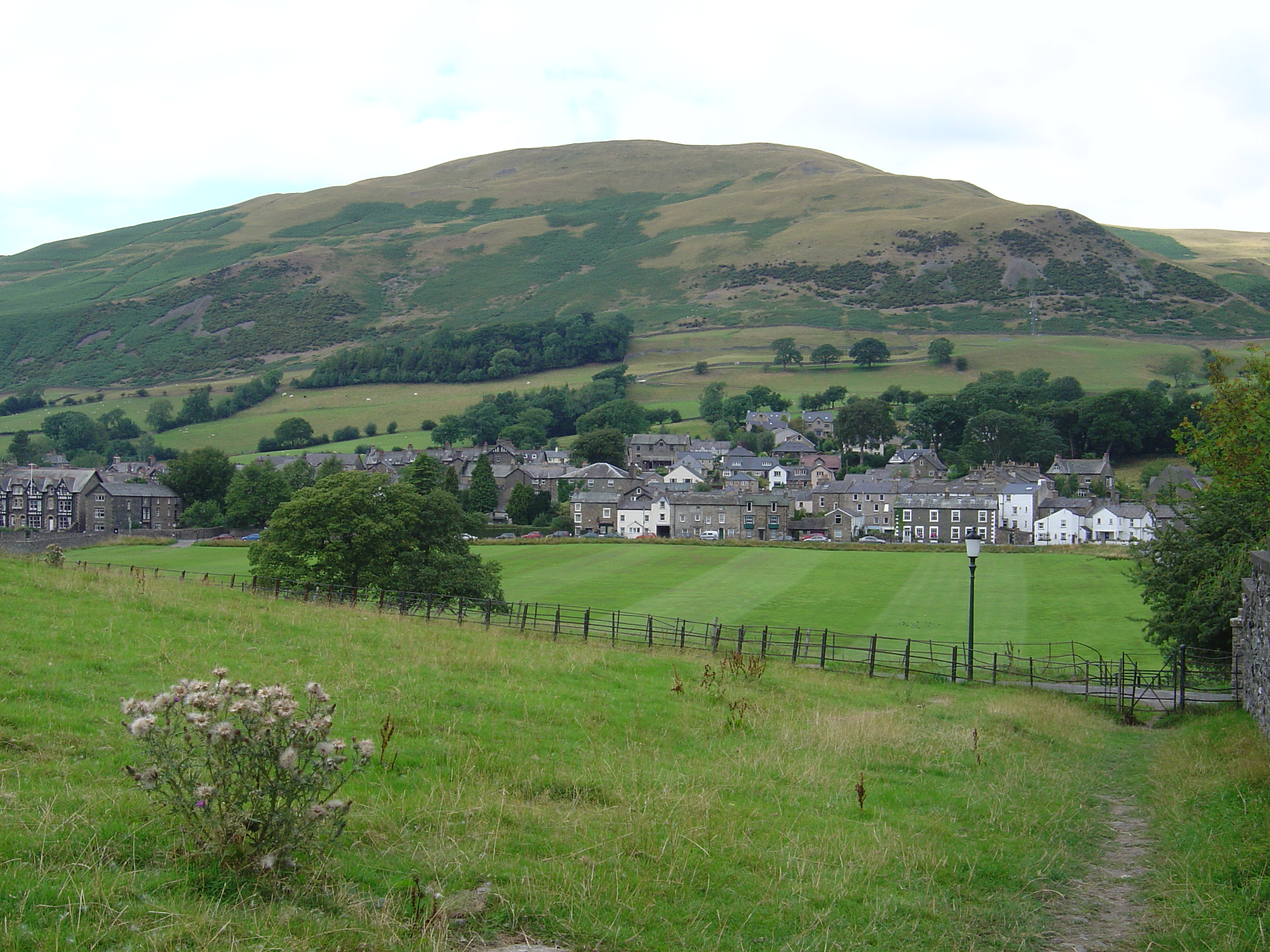

- Location in the former South Lakeland district Location within Cumbria
- Population: 2,765 (2011)
- OS grid reference: SD6592
- Civil parish: Sedbergh
- Unitary authority: Westmorland and Furness
- Ceremonial county: Cumbria
- Region: North West
- Country: England
- Sovereign state: United Kingdom
- Post town: SEDBERGH
- Postcode district: LA10
- Dialling code: 015396
- Police: Cumbria
- Fire: Cumbria
- Ambulance: North West
- UK Parliament: Morecambe and Lunesdale

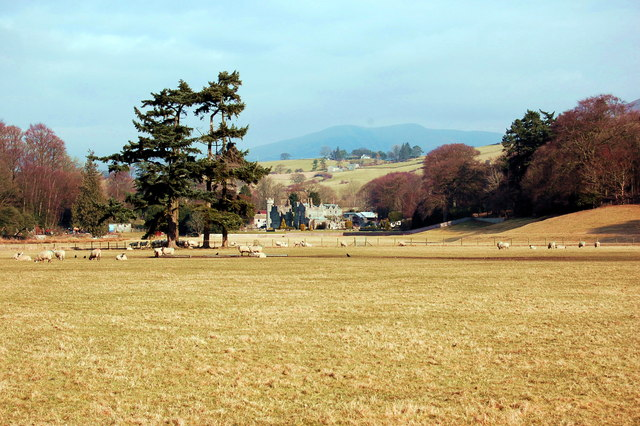
Ingmire Hall, from the south

Sedbergh (/ˈsɛdbər/ SED-bər or locally /ˈsɛbər/ SEB-ər) is a town and civil parish in the Westmorland and Furness area of the ceremonial county of Cumbria, England, about 10 miles (16 km) east of Kendal, 28 miles (45 km) north of Lancaster and about 10 miles (16 km) north of Kirkby Lonsdale. It is part of the West Riding of Yorkshire.

In 2021, the civil parish had a population of 2,765. It lies within the Yorkshire Dales National Park at the foot of Howgill Fells, on the north bank of the River Rawthey, which joins the River Lune 2 miles (3 km) below the town.

== Situation ==
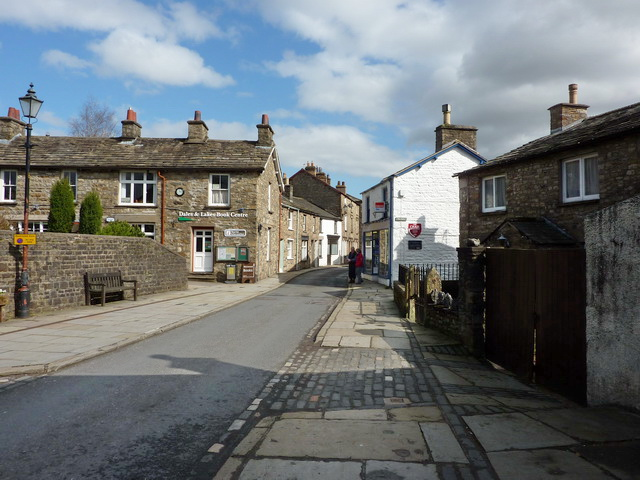
Main Street

Sedbergh has a narrow main street lined with shops. From all angles, the hills rising behind the houses can be seen. Until the coming of the Ingleton branch line in 1861, these remote places were reachable only by walking over some steep hills. Passenger services through Sedbergh railway station ran from 1861 to 1954.

The civil parish covers a large area, including the hamlets of Millthrop, Catholes, Marthwaite, Brigflatts, High Oaks, Howgill, Lowgill and Cautley, the southern part of the Howgill Fells and the western part of Baugh Fell.

George Fox, a founder of the Religious Society of Friends (Quakers), spoke in the churchyard of St Andrew's Church (which Quakers of the day called a "steeple house") and on nearby Firbank Fell during his travels in the North of England in 1652. Briggflatts Meeting House was built in 1675. It is the namesake of Basil Bunting's long poem Briggflatts (1966).

Sedbergh has three schools: Sedbergh Primary School, its main state funded primary school, Settlebeck School, its main state-funded secondary school, and Sedbergh School which is a co-educational public boarding school in the town.

== History ==
The name Sedbergh derives from the Old Norse setberg meaning 'flat topped hill'.

Sedbergh's parish church, dedicated to St Andrew the Apostle, dates from the 12th century, although restored periodically since. There is at least one house in the village dating from the 14th century. The remains of the motte and bailey castle are believed to date from Saxon times.

Sedbergh's longstanding industries were farming and the production of woollen garments. Wool was taken to mills for spinning into yarn, from which people in their homes knitted clothing such as hats and socks. These were sold, for instance, to coal miners of North-East England. This trade of long ago is remembered at Farfield Mill, just outside the town, which has an exhibition of weaving equipment and other periodical exhibitions, and hosts workshops for a number of artists and crafts workers.

Sedbergh was part of the Ewecross wapentake in the West Riding of Yorkshire. From 1894 to 1974 it was part of Sedbergh Rural District in the West Riding. In 1974 it became part of the new county of Cumbria, which ceased to have administrative functions in 2023 but continues as a ceremonial county with a lord lieutenant and high sheriff.

== Governance ==
Sedbergh belongs to the Morecambe and Lunesdale parliamentary constituency, of which Lizzi Collinge is the current Labour Party member. Before Brexit, it was in the North West England European Parliamentary Constituency.

Sedbergh is part of the Sedbergh and Kirkby Lonsdale ward of Westmorland and Furness Council area.

Sedbergh has a parish council.

== Economy and amenities ==
Personal incomes come from a range of sources: the schools are major employers. Sedbergh is also England's official book town (like Hay-on-Wye in Wales and Wigtown in Scotland). Though smaller than these, it has several independent bookshops and dealers. Employment in small to medium manufacturing and wholesale companies may match or exceed that of schools – a growing feature of the economy. Other major sources are farming, retail and tourism. The profile of Sedbergh improved after it got featured in a BBC documentary series, The Town that Wants a Twin, airing for twelve episodes in January and February 2005. One result was for Sedbergh to twin with Zreče in north-eastern Slovenia.

The town suffered an outbreak of foot-and-mouth disease in 2001. As livestock farming declined, it became a destination for walkers and ramblers. In 2015 the town was accepted as a Walkers are Welcome town.

The town golf club is located at Catholes-Abbott Holme.

A monthly booklet "Sedbergh and District Lookaround" gives details of local events and activities, including bus times and religious services.

== Media ==
Local news and television programmes are provided by BBC North West and ITV Border. Television signals are received from one of the two local relay transmitters (Sedbergh and Millthrop).

The town is served by both BBC Radio Lancashire and BBC Radio Cumbria. Other radio stations including Heart North West, Smooth Lake District, Greatest Hits Radio Cumbria & South West Scotland, Greatest Hits Radio Harrogate and the Yorkshire Dales and Dales Radio, a community based station.

The local newspaper that covers the town is The Westmorland Gazette.

== Landmarks ==
Ingmire Hall, about two miles (three kilometres) west of the town, dates mainly from the 16th century and includes a pele tower. The house was expanded in the Victorian era, by a local architect, George Webster, and further extended in the 20th century. A fire in the 1920s caused major damage but the 1980s saw restoration work on the house. It is constructed of rubble stone coursed with quoins, with a slate roof. The hall is privately owned but a public footpath follows the drive.

St Gregory's Church is a redundant Anglican church on the A684 road about 1 1/2 miles (2.5 kilometres) west of Sedbergh. It is designated a Grade II listed building recorded in the National Heritage List for England, maintained by Historic England and under the care of the Churches Conservation Trust.

The Cross Keys Temperance Inn is a 400-year-old pub now run by the National Trust.

== Twin towns ==
Sedbergh has been twinned with Zreče, Slovenia since 2005.

== See also ==
- Listed buildings in Sedbergh
- Sedbergh School
- Settlebeck School
- Slingsby T.21, glider known in RAF service as the Sedbergh
