= Aysgarth railway station =

Disused railway station in North Yorkshire, England

Aysgarth
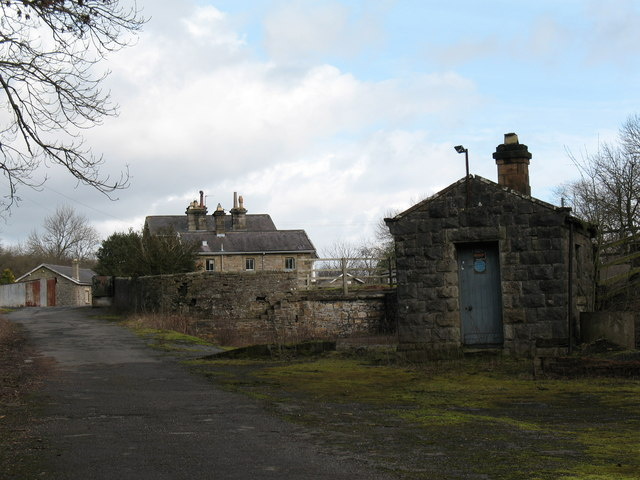

General information
- Location: Aysgarth, North Yorkshire; England
- Coordinates: 54.296256°N 1.981759°W
- Grid reference: SE012889
- Platforms: 2

Other information
- Status: Disused

History
- Original company: North Eastern Railway
- Pre-grouping: North Eastern Railway
- Post-grouping: London and North Eastern Railway

Key dates
- 1 February 1877: Station opened
- 26 April 1954: Station closed
Location

Aysgarth railway station is a disused railway station in North Yorkshire, England, near Aysgarth Falls. It was part of the Hawes Branch of the North Eastern Railway from its opening in 1877 until closure in April 1954.

The Wensleydale Railway Association aims to rebuild the railway from Northallerton (from its current western terminus at Redmire) to Garsdale and plans to re-open the station.

== History ==
The station was opened by the North Eastern Railway on 1 February 1877. The line became part of the London and North Eastern Railway (LNER) during the Grouping of 1923.

The station was host to a camping coach from 1935 to 1939 and could possibly have had a coach in 1933 and/or 1934. The station was also one of those used by the LNER touring camping coach service in 1935.

The line passed to the North Eastern Region of British Railways on nationalisation in 1948. It was closed by the British Transport Commission in April 1954, although goods traffic continued until the Redmire to Hawes section closed to all traffic in 1964.

== Aysgarth site today ==
The track had previously been lifted through the station site. In 2017 the station was sold into private hands after the Wensleydale Railway stated that it was costing too much to keep on their books. The nearest operational part of the railway is the Wensleydale Railway, a heritage line which operates from Redmire to Leeming Bar and Northallerton West. As of June 2022, track at the station has been re-instated after its new owner, David Smith of West Coast Railways, was granted permission by The Yorkshire Dales National Park Authority.

Disused railways
Askrigg; Line and station closed	North Eastern Railway; Hawes Branch	Redmire; Line closed, station open
Preceding station	Heritage railways	Following station
Proposed extension
Askrigg towards Garsdale	Wensleydale Railway	Redmire towards Leeming Bar

== Bibliography ==
- McRae, Andrew (1997). British Railway Camping Coach Holidays: The 1930s & British Railways (London Midland Region). Vol. Scenes from the Past: 30 (Part One). Foxline. ISBN 1-870119-48-7.
- Quick, Michael (2022) [2001]. Railway passenger stations in Great Britain: a chronology (PDF). version 5.04. Railway & Canal Historical Society. Archived from the original (PDF) on 25 November 2022.
