= Garsdale Head =

Landform watershed in Northern England

Coordinates: 54.32306°N 2.32985°W

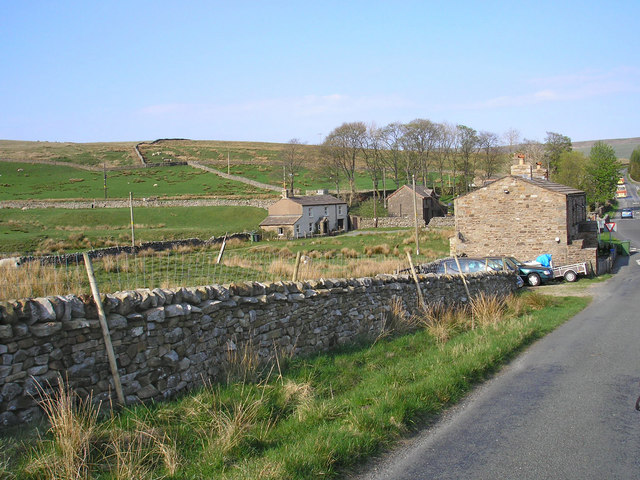
- Garsdale Head

- Location within Cumbria
- OS grid reference: SD786919
  - London: 210 mi (340 km) SE
- Civil parish: Garsdale
- Unitary authority: Westmorland and Furness
- Ceremonial county: Cumbria
- Region: North West
- Country: England
- Sovereign state: United Kingdom
- Post town: Sedbergh
- Postcode district: LA10
- Dialling code: 015396
- Police: Cumbria
- Fire: Cumbria
- Ambulance: North West
- UK Parliament: Morecambe & Lunesdale

Garsdale Head is a hamlet mainly within the Westmorland and Furness unitary authority of Cumbria, England. Historically part of the West Riding of Yorkshire, the hamlet is now on the border with North Yorkshire. It lies within the boundaries of the Yorkshire Dales National Park.

Garsdale Head is mainly within the civil parish and valley of Garsdale, and on the A684 road between Sedbergh, approximately 8 miles (13 km) to the west (ten miles by road), and Hawes, 5 miles (8 km) to the east. The hamlet's chief landmark is Garsdale railway station on the Settle to Carlisle and Wensleydale Railways. Until the branch line to Hawes was closed in 1964 the alternative name for Garsdale Head was Hawes Junction, a name which remains in common use.

Sixteen cottages were built by the Midland Railway Company for its employees soon after the opening of the line in 1876. Another six "Moorcock Cottages" were built in similar Victorian style half a mile away over the border in Richmondshire. Just before the border, in a matching building style (because it was built by Midland Railway contractors), is Mount Zion Chapel, a Primitive Methodist meeting-place which is still used for special events.

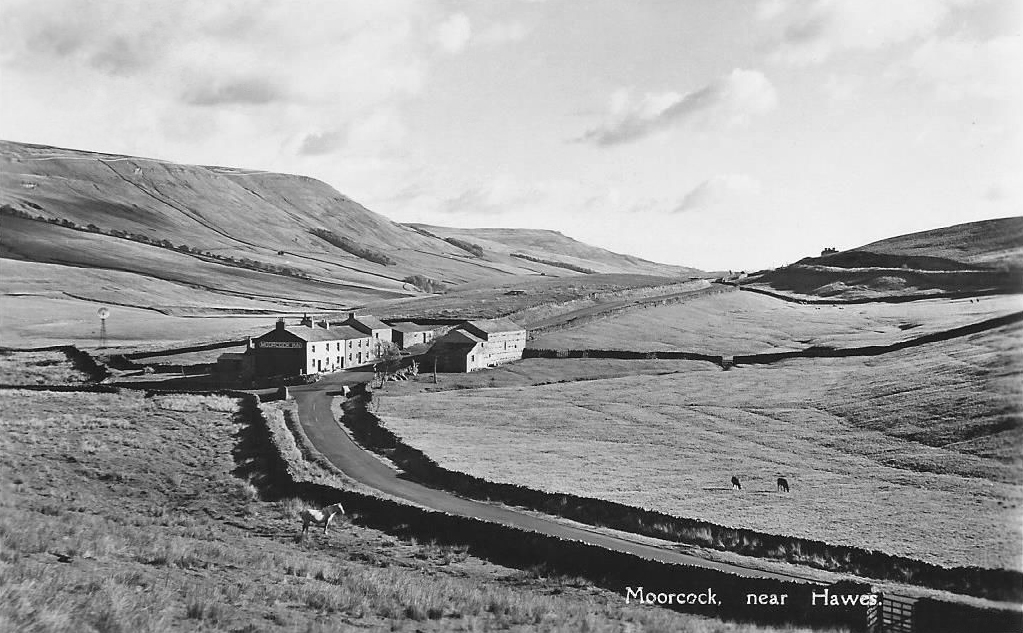
The Moorcock Inn c. 1900–05

Apart from one Edwardian building, Clough View, all buildings in the hamlet are older, or are renovations of older properties. The Moorcock Inn, at the junction of the A684 and the B6259 to Kirkby Stephen via Lunds, Mallerstang and Nateby, is the only public house in the 16-mile journey between Sedbergh and Hawes, and has an adjoining Bed and Breakfast establishment. The inn, in the Hawes civil parish of Richmondshire, is 400 yards (370m) east from the border with Cumbria, and 1,480 yards (1,350m) north-east from Garsdale railway station. According to The Yorkshire Post, the Moorcock Inn dates to the 1740s. West of the inn towards Garsdale station is Dandry Mire Viaduct (alternatively called Moorcock Viaduct) on the Settle–Carlisle line, over which passed, on Christmas Eve 1910, the St Pancras to Glasgow Express which collided into the rear of two engines. The twelve dead from the crash were kept in the Moorcock Inn cellar before burial in Hawes churchyard.

There are toilet facilities at Garsdale station, and an original public red telephone box at the bottom of a steep hill to the station. There was a post office at Garsdale Head between 1881 and June 1963. About 1911 it was located in a shop within a stone-built house, but in 1934 it was described and pictured as being "nothing but a tin hut, nine feet by six". The office was replaced in 1963 by one at Garsdale, which has since closed.

The Coal Road, which joins Garsdale Head to Dent railway station at the north-east of Cowgill, and skirts the north west slopes of Great Knoutberry Hill, is a scenic single-track route, suitable for walkers, cyclists and motor vehicles except when there is snow or ice, when its steep surface becomes treacherous.

== See also ==
- Listed buildings in Garsdale
