= Carperby-cum-Thoresby =

Civil parish in North Yorkshire, England

Coordinates: 54.304649°N 1.98837°W

Carperby-Cum-Thorseby
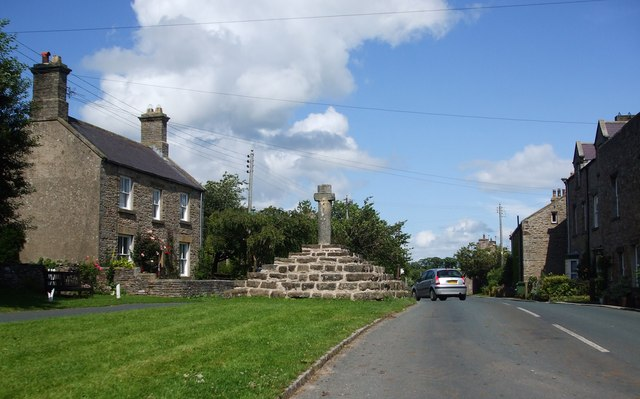
- Village of Caperby showing market cross

- Location within North Yorkshire
- Population: 200 (2011 census)
- OS grid reference: SE008898
- Unitary authority: North Yorkshire
- Ceremonial county: North Yorkshire
- Region: Yorkshire and the Humber
- Country: England
- Sovereign state: United Kingdom
- Post town: LEYBURN
- Postcode district: DL8
- Police: North Yorkshire
- Fire: North Yorkshire
- Ambulance: Yorkshire

Carperby-cum-Thoresby is a civil parish in the county of North Yorkshire, England. The parish contains the village of Carperby and the hamlets of High and Low Thoresby. It is situated north of Aysgarth and the main village of Carperby is 22.8 miles (36.7 km) west of the County Town of Northallerton. The population at the 2011 Census by ONS was 200.

== History ==
The village of Carperby is mentioned in the Domesday Book as Chirprebi. At the time of the Norman invasion the manor was the possession of Thor and afterwards granted to Enisant Musard by Count Alan of Brittany to whom it had been given by the Crown. Thereafter the lands became one of many feudal tenures that belonged to the constables of Richmond. The Lascelles family held the manor here during the 13th century, with the exception of a small area held by the Thoresby family after whom the hamlets in the parish are named. During the 14th century, the manor was tenured to the Wauton family of Masham and by 1421 had passed to the Scrope family of nearby Castle Bolton, whose descent it followed thereafter.

In the centre of Carperby there is a high-stepped cross dated 1674 indicating that Carperby once had a market. The charter for the market was granted in 1305 for weekly markets and fairs on St James' Day in July and St Andrew's Day in November. The Wheatsheaf Hotel was where James Herriot and his bride spent their honeymoon in 1941.

There was a Wesleyan Chapel erected here in 1826. The Friends Meeting House was erected in 1864 and signifies the importance of Quakerism in Wensleydale at that time. Both are now private residences. The village had a school for over 100 years until its closure in 1962.

The toponymy of Carperby is derived from the Old Norse personal name of Cairpe combined with bi to give the meaning of Cairpe's farm. The toponymy of Thoresby is derived from the Old Norse personal name of Thorir combined with bi to give the meaning of Thorir's farm.

== Governance ==
The village lies within the Richmond and Northallerton UK Parliament constituency. It lies within the unitary authority of North Yorkshire Council which was formed in 2023. From 1974 to 2023 it was part of the district of Richmondshire.

The local Parish Council has five Councillors and a Parish Clerk.

== Geography ==
The village of Carpeby is one mile north of Aysgarth. The Parish extends up the valley containing Belden Beck onto Carpeby and West Bolton Moors. Among the slopes can be found the remains of former lead mines and their tips. There are also many springs and shakeholes in the Parish. Near the village were two natural wells named St Matthew's Well and St James' Well, the former running dry in 1975 but the latter still providing water.

== Demography ==
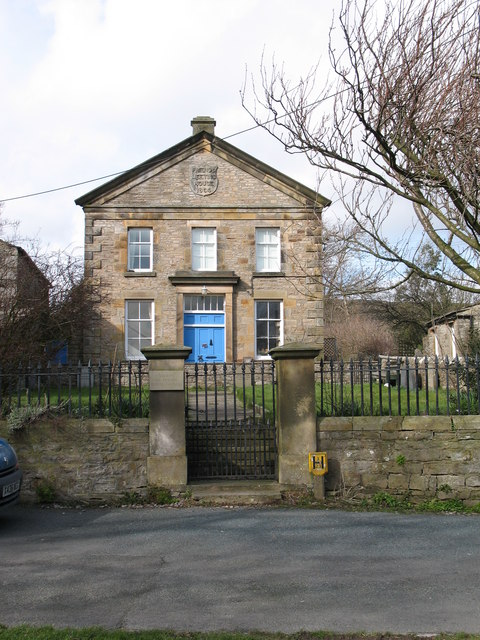
Former Friends Meeting House, Carperby

Population
Year	1881	1891	1901	1911	1921	1931	1951	1961	2001	2011
Total	298	244	232	200	226	242	210	192	221	200

=== 2001 census ===
The 2001 UK census showed that the population was split 46.4% male to 53.6% female. The religious constituency was made of 84.5% Christian and the rest stating no religion or not stating at all. The ethnic make-up was 98.6% White British and 1.5% Black British. There were 112 dwellings.

=== 2011 census ===
The 2011 UK census showed that the population was split 48% male to 52% female. The religious constituency was made of 65% Christian and the rest stating no religion or not stating at all. The ethnic make-up was 99.5% White British and 0.5% each Mixed Ethnic. There were 126 dwellings.

== See also ==
- Listed buildings in Carperby-cum-Thoresby
