= Carperby Market Cross =

Listed building in North Yorkshire, England

Coordinates: 54°18′11″N 1°59′31″W

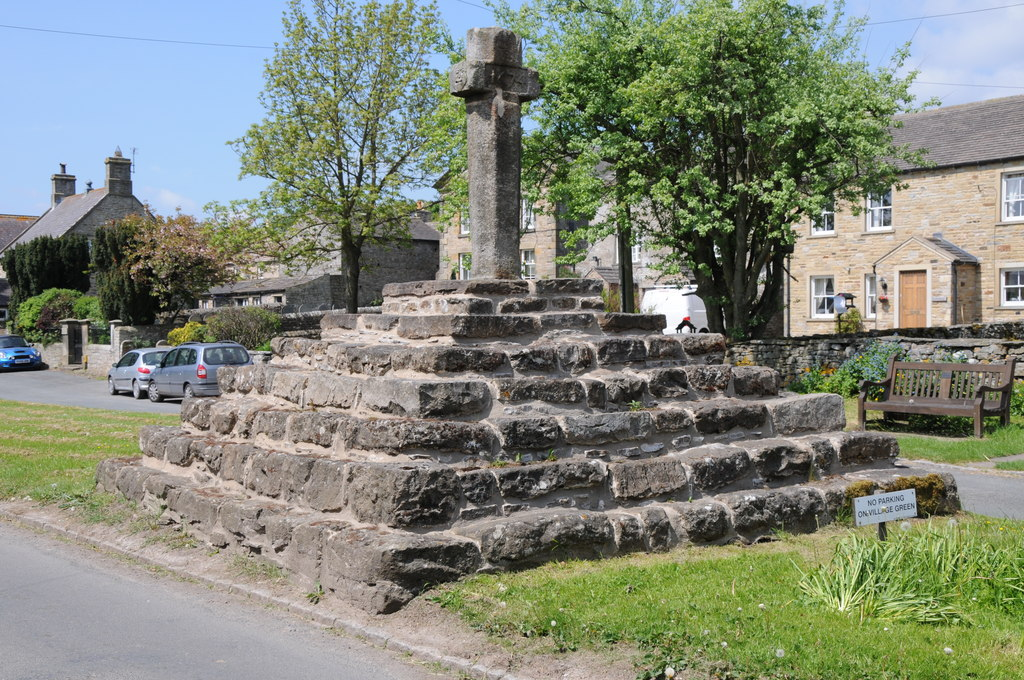
The cross, in 2013

Carperby Market Cross is a historic structure in Carperby, a village in Wensleydale, in England.

Carperby was granted a market charter in 1305, but it is believed that it ceased to hold markets around 1587, when nearby Aysgarth assumed greater importance. A market was restarted in the 17th century, and it is possible that the market cross was erected to commemorate this occasion. The cross was erected in the village centre in 1674, and restored in 1843. The Yorkshire Dales National Park Authority argues that the base may be of this later date. It was Grade II listed in 1952, and made a scheduled monument in 1995.

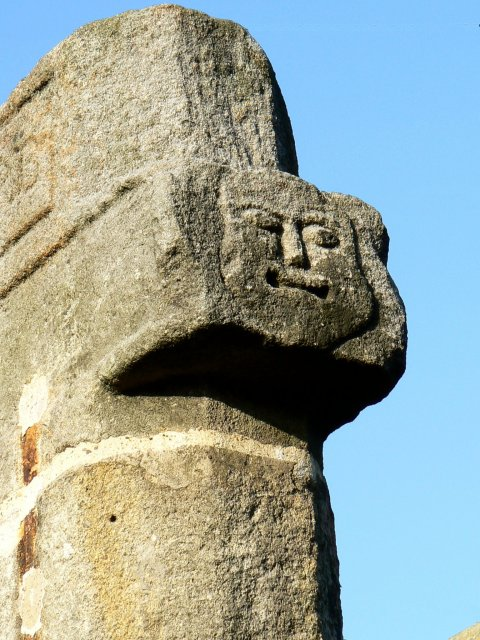
Face on the end of one of the arms

The cross is constructed of sandstone, and has an octagonal tapering shaft on a base of seven square steps. On the arms of the cross are recessed square panels, and on the top is a panel containing initials. The date 1674 is on the east face of the arms, and 1843 on the west face, along with an inscription "RB". On the ends are face masks in bas-relief.

== See also ==
- Listed buildings in Carperby-cum-Thoresby
