= Bear Park =

Bear Park is the name of:

- Bearpark, a village in County Durham, in England
- Bear Park, North Yorkshire, a manor house and estate in England
- Bear Park Township, Norman County, Minnesota, a settlement in the United States

== See also ==
- Michael Bearpark, English scientist and musician
- North Sydney Oval, also known as Bear Park due to being the traditional home of the North Sydney Bears, a Rugby league team based in the area
