= Askrigg railway station =

Disused railway station in North Yorkshire, England

Askrigg
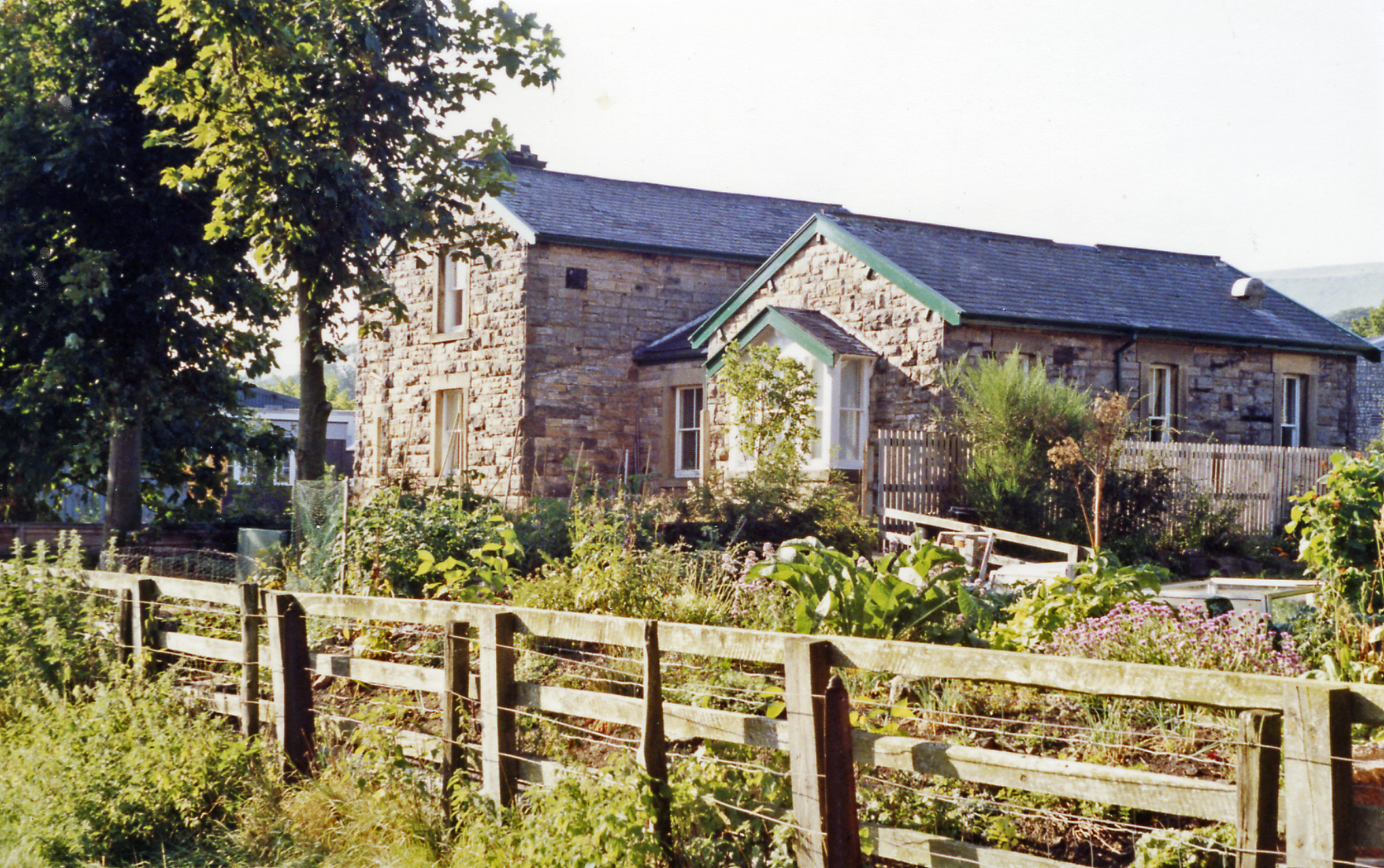
- Station buildings in August 1991

General information
- Location: Askrigg, North Yorkshire; England
- Coordinates: 54.313019°N 2.089808°W
- Grid reference: SD942908
- Platforms: 1

Other information
- Status: Disused

History
- Original company: North Eastern Railway
- Pre-grouping: North Eastern Railway
- Post-grouping: London and North Eastern Railway

Key dates
- 1 February 1877: Station opened
- 26 April 1954: Station closed
Location

Askrigg railway station is a disused railway station in North Yorkshire, England, and served the village of Askrigg. It was located 660 yards (600 m) west of the village, in the neighbouring civil parish of Low Abbotside. It was part of the Wensleydale Railway until it closed. The Wensleydale Railway Association aims to rebuild the railway from Northallerton to Garsdale, with an eventual aim of reopening the intermediate stations.

== History ==
The station was opened by the North Eastern Railway on 1 February 1877, with station buildings designed by Thomas Prosser and a single platform. The main running line was the northernmost track which had the platform adjoining; the southern track was not furnished with a platform, and although two goods trains, or a goods and a passenger train could pass at the station, it was unsuited to two passenger workings passing there. The line became part of the London and North Eastern Railway during the Grouping of 1923.

The station was host to a camping coach from 1936 to 1939 and could possibly have had a coach in 1933 and/or 1934.

The line then passed on to the North Eastern Region of British Railways on nationalisation in 1948. It was subsequently closed by the British Transport Commission on 26 April 1954, although goods traffic continued until the Redmire to Hawes section closed to all traffic in 1964.

== The site today ==
The track has been lifted through the station site. The nearest track on the line runs from Redmire eastward, providing rail access for military traffic to local training areas. The Wensleydale Railway is a heritage line which plans to operate from Redmire to Northallerton West but is currently (2025) only providing passenger services between Leyburn and Leeming Bar with occasional extensions to Scruton.

Askrigg station buildings have been nicely restored and are now used by Bainbridge Vets with the upper floor in use as residential accommodation. Part of the former goods yard now accommodates the Askrigg Brewery (aka The Yorkshire Dales Brewery) and there is parking laid out for both establishments.

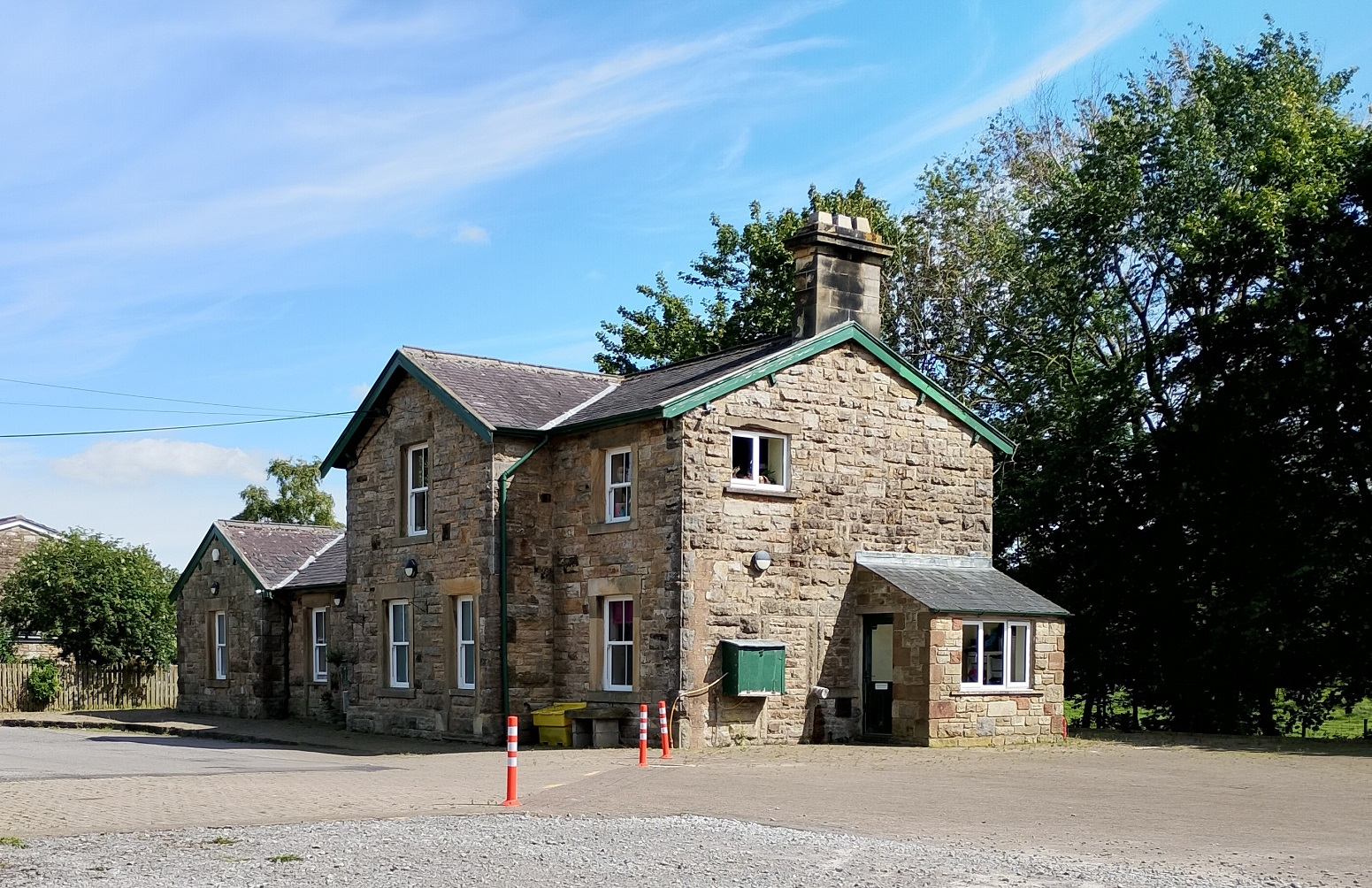
The former station building at Askrigg, now a vet's surgery, seen in July 2025.

Disused railways
Hawes; Line and station closed	North Eastern Railway; Hawes Branch	Aysgarth; Line and station closed
Preceding station	Heritage railways	Following station
Proposed extension
Hawes towards Garsdale	Wensleydale Railway	Aysgarth towards Leeming Bar

== Bibliography ==
- McRae, Andrew (1997). British Railway Camping Coach Holidays: The 1930s & British Railways (London Midland Region). Vol. Scenes from the Past: 30 (Part One). Foxline. ISBN 1-870119-48-7.
- Quick, Michael (2022) [2001]. Railway passenger stations in Great Britain: a chronology (PDF). version 5.04. Railway & Canal Historical Society. Archived from the original (PDF) on 25 November 2022.
