= Carperby Quaker Meeting House =

Quaker meeting house in Carperby, North Yorkshire, England

Coordinates: 54°18′12″N 1°59′34″W

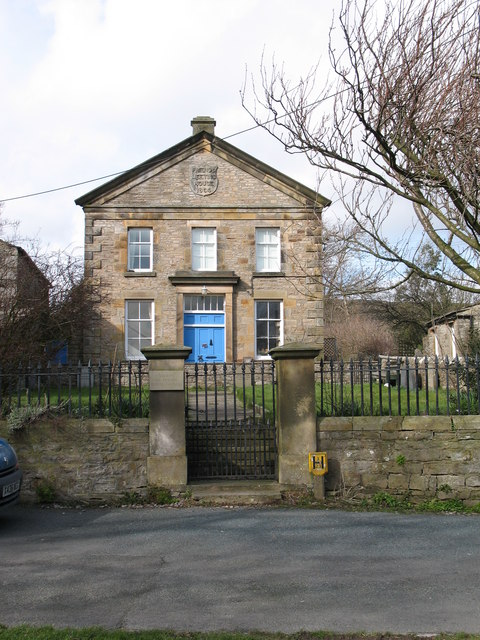
The building, in 2007

Carperby Quaker Meeting House is a former place of worship in Carperby, a village in Wensleydale, in England.

Wensleydale was an early centre of Quaker worship, with Richard Robinson preaching in Carperby in 1658 or 1659, and converting several families when he returned a few years later. A meeting in Carperby was licensed in 1689, immediately following the Toleration Act 1688. This was probably held in a private house, but in 1705, a dedicated building was acquired. The current building was constructed in 1864, becoming the meeting place also for Quakers in Aysgarth. The Yorkshire Dales National Park Authority describes it, in terms of its architecture, as "the most sophisticated building in the village". The meeting moved to Leyburn in 1984, and the building has since been converted into a house.

The building is constructed of stone with a Westmorland slate roof. It has two storeys and fronts of three bays. The entrance front has a pedimented gable on a moulded string course. It contains a central doorway with chamfered rusticated quoins and a divided fanlight, and sash windows. In the tympanum of the pediment is an inscribed and dated panel. It has been Grade II listed since 1986.

== See also ==
- Listed buildings in Carperby-cum-Thoresby
