= Coal Road =

Ancient road in Cumbria, England

Coordinates: 54.297°N 2.330°W

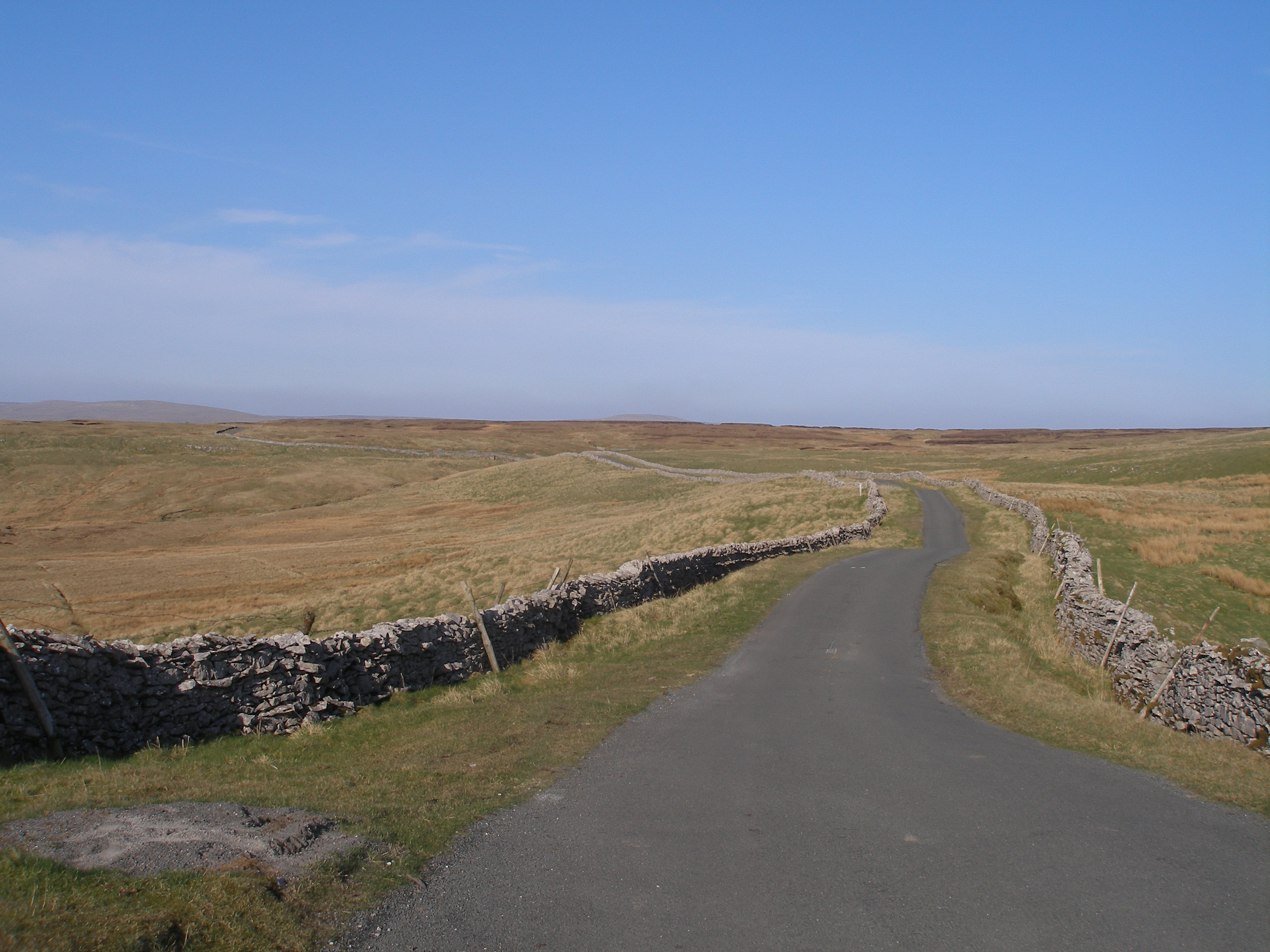
- The Coal Road, looking north

Route information
- Length: 4 mi (6.4 km)
- Existed: 12th century–present

Major junctions
- North end: Garsdale
- South end: Dent

Location
- Country: United Kingdom
- Constituent country: England
- Counties: Cumbria,

Road network
- Roads in the United Kingdom; Motorways; A and B road zones

The Coal Road (also known as the Galloway Gate Road) is an unclassified highway which connects the railway stations at Garsdale and Dent in Cumbria, England. The road is within the Yorkshire Dales National Park, and was historically part of the West Riding of Yorkshire. (Note: Both Dentdale and Garsdale were within the West Riding of Yorkshire until 1974, when boundary changes placed the two dales into Cumbria. A large portion of this area is now part of the Yorkshire Dales National Park.) The name derives from its use transporting locally mined coal, although before that it was used as a droving route between England and Scotland through Mallerstang.

== History ==
The Coal Road connects Garsdale and Dentdale, scouting the western edge of Great Knoutberry Hill, reaching a height of 1,755 feet (535 m). Due to its height, it regularly is blocked by snow during the winter months. The road gets its name from the many coal workings that were scattered around to the east of the road on the northern slopes of Great Knoutberry.

A licence to work the coal by the road was first granted in 1742, and the miners used The Coal Road to move their coal by pack horse into Dentdale, Garsdale, Sedbergh, and even as far as Kendal, until the coming of the Settle Carlisle Railway, which allowed better coal to be railed in from elsewhere. At its height, the coal-mining industry on the northern edge of Great Knoutberry extended to twenty workings, but all were fairly shallow pits dug easily from ground level down. The seam of coal was only 7 inches (180 mm) thick, but was valued by the whitesmiths in the dale. Cross Pits Colliery, the largest coal concern, was registered as being 1,800 feet (550 m) above sea level. The pits were mostly shallow and winding of the coal was by hand, using a winch known as a "jack roller".

Mapping also shows the name of the track to be Galloway Gate Road. Galloway Gate was part of the old drovers route between England and Scotland through Mallerstang (to the north). The Coal Road from Lea Yeat in Cowgill, to Garsdale railway station is 4 miles (6.4 km) long, and was tarmacked in 1954. The name Galwaithegate was referred to in a document from the 12th century, describing a road between Tebay and Kirkby Lonsdale along which cattle were transported. It is thought that the Scottish Galloway cattle may have given rise to the name.

The Coal Road is renowned in cycling circles due to its steep climb from Dentdale out towards Garsdale Head, and the tarmacked route which "undulates like a fairground ride". The road is part of the Etape du Dales sportive which is held each May. A section of the road is part of the Pennine Bridleway.
