= Moorcock Inn, Hawes =

Former pub in the Yorkshire Dales, England

Moorcock Inn
- The pub in 2013
- Former names: The Guide Post Inn; The Junction Inn

General information
- Status: Converted to bed and breakfast and tearoom
- Type: Public house (former)
- Location: Garsdale, Yorkshire Dales National Park, England
- Coordinates: 54.329°N 2.312°W
- Elevation: 1,050 feet (320 m)
- Year built: 1740s
- Closed: 2023 (as a pub)

Website
- www.the-moorcock.co.uk

The Moorcock Inn is a former public house near the watershed between the rivers Clough and Ure, in Upper Wensleydale, North Yorkshire, England. It is adjacent to the junction of the A684 road and the B6259 road and near Garsdale railway station on the Settle–Carlisle line. The history of the inn can be traced back to the 1740s but it has been called The Moorcock only since 1840. The pub is near some long-distance paths and is popular with walkers. It closed in 2023 and was converted into a bed and breakfast and tearoom.

== History ==
The building, constructed in the 1740s, is at a remote road junction at the head of Wensleydale and is named on Ordnance Survey mapping. Although its postal address is Sedbergh in Cumbria, it is actually in North Yorkshire, in the civil parish of Hawes, and at the point where the nascent River Ure turns eastwards, some 5.5 miles (8.9 km) west of Hawes, and 1 mile (1.6 km) from Garsdale railway station. The name of the pub before 1840 was listed as The Guide Post Inn. In the 1870s the pub was popular with the railway navvies living in a camp near the pub while building the Settle-Carlisle railway and the Wensleydale Line to Hawes. Some of the navvies who drank there referred to it as The Junction Inn. During that time it was fined for "allowing drunkenness [and] serving outside of permitted hours".

After a train crash at nearby Ais Gill in 1910, twelve bodies were stored in the pub until they could be buried at Hawes, and the preliminary inquiry into the crash was held there since it was "the largest room for miles". In 1975 the landlords died in a fire on the day of their retirement party.

The building, which is 1,050 feet (320 m) above sea level, is adjacent to the junction of the B6259 road and the A684. It is also on the Pennine Bridleway and near the Pennine Journey and the Dales High Way. Owing to its height at the west end of Wensleydale, the Moorcock is known to be the wettest place in Wensleydale, averaging 70 inches (1,800 mm) of rainfall a year. The route of the B6259 was built in 1825 as an alternative to the through road to Mallerstang from Cotterdale. From Monday to Friday four buses per day in each direction connect Garsdale railway station and the Moorcock Inn with Hawes.

The pub closed in 2023, and planning documents lodged in 2024 indicate the owners intent to convert the pub into a tearoom and living accommodation.
