= Listed buildings in Garsdale =

Garsdale is a civil parish in Westmorland and Furness, Cumbria, England. It contains 62 listed buildings that are recorded in the National Heritage List for England. Of these, three are listed at Grade II*, the middle of the three grades, and the others are at Grade II, the lowest grade. The parish is in the Yorkshire Dales National Park: it contains the village of Garsdale and the hamlet of Garsdale Head, and is otherwise rural. The A684 road runs through the valley, and most of the listed buildings are situated along, or are close to this road. The Settle–Carlisle line of the former Midland Railway passes through the eastern part of the parish, and the listed buildings associated with this are a viaduct, a bridge and a station box. Most of the other listed buildings are farmhouses, farm buildings, and houses and associated structures, along with other bridges, milestones, a church, chapels, and a boundary marker.

== Key ==
| Grade | Criteria |
|---|---|
| II* | Particularly important buildings of more than special interest |
| II | Buildings of national importance and special interest |

== Buildings ==
| Name and location | Photograph | Date | Notes | Grade |
|---|---|---|---|---|
| East Rackenthwaite and barn 54.30785°N 2.41297°W | — | 16th or early 17th century (probable) | A farmhouse and barn later combined into a single dwelling. It is in sandstone with quoins and a stone-slate roof. There is an L-shaped plan, consisting of a main range, an extension to the west with an outshut added to the rear, and the former barn continuing to the east. The building has two storeys and a south front of six bays. On the front is a gabled porch, and the windows are mixed, some are mullioned, some are casements, and some are sashes. At the west is a large projecting stepped chimney stack. The barn has garage doors and replaced windows. | II* |
| High Scale Farmhouse, stable and barn 54.31736°N 2.33409°W | | 16th or early 17th century (probable) | The farmhouse and outbuildings are in sandstone with quoins and stone-slate roofs. They form a linear plan, consisting of a two-bay farmhouse, a single-bay stable to the west, and a through-passage and a five-bay barn to the east. The house has two storeys with a continuous outshut at the rear, a central square-headed doorway and windows with altered glazing. A flight of external steps forms a porch over the through-passage, and leads to a loft door. In the barn is a segmental-headed wagon entrance, a doorway, and two square openings. | II |
| East Scale Farmhouse and outbuilding 54.34032°N 2.35943°W | | 17th century or earlier (probable) | The farmhouse and outbuilding to the west are in sandstone and derelict, the outbuilding without a roof. The farmhouse is on a plinth, with quoins, through-stones, and a stone-slate roof. There are two storeys, a symmetrical three-bay front, a central doorway, and windows without glazing. The outbuilding, which was added later, has a doorway and two windows in each floor. | II |
| Ben's Bridge (East Paradise); 54.30263°N 2.38294°W | — | 17th century (probable) | Originally a packhorse bridge over Clough River, it was rebuilt in 1895. It is in sandstone, and consists of a single wide segmental arch. The bridge has voussoirs, a band, a humped deck, and parapets with triangular coping stones. | II |
| Low House and barn 54.30184°N 2.40492°W | | Mid to late 17th century (probable) | A farmhouse with a cottage added in the 19th century, and a barn at the rear, they are in stone with slate roofs. There are two storeys, four bays, a single-story gabled porch with pigeon holes in the gable and in the wall above, and sash windows. The barn contains various doorways and ventilation slits. | II |
| Birkrigg and barn 54.30887°N 2.42580°W | — | Late 17th century (probable) | The farmhouse and the barn to the east are in stone with quoins and stone-slate roofs. The house has two storeys, three bays, and a small single-story rear wing. On the front is a 20th-century conservatory, a square-headed doorway, and casement windows. The barn has six bays with a one-bay extension, a segmental-headed wagon entrance with voussoirs, doorways, a loading door, a window, and external steps lead to a loft door. | II |
| Ingheads; 54.31142°N 2.34752°W | — | Late 17th century (probable) | A farmhouse and barn, later a private house, in stone with quoins and a stone-slate roof. It has a T-shaped plan, consisting of a main range, a gabled rear wing, and a barn continuing to the east. The house has two storeys, two bays, a band, a very wide porch with two outer doorways flanking a pier, pigeon holes in the gable, internal stone benches, and two inner doorways. The windows are fixed. | II |
| Bridge over Grisdale Beck; 54.34039°N 2.35857°W | | Late 17th century (probable) | The bridge over the beck is in stone. It consists of a small segmental arch with a humped deck and voussoirs. There are no parapets. | II |
| Dandra Garth; 54.30240°N 2.38055°W | — | Late 17th century (probable) | A large farmhouse on a prominent plinth, it has irregular quoins, a stone-slate roof, and three storeys. The farmhouse has a T-shaped plan with a three-bay main range, and a later rear wing. On the front is a gabled porch with pigeon holes, and a square-headed doorway. Most of the windows are fixed, and in the top storey they are smaller. | II* |
| East Little Town; 54.30384°N 2.37217°W | — | Late 17th century (probable) | A farmhouse and attached outbuilding in sandstone with quoins and a slate roof with a coped left gable. The house has two storeys, four bays, and a central lean-to porch. The windows in the ground floor are fixed, and in the upper floor they are casements. At the rear is a blocked stair window. | II |
| Swarth Gill; 54.30662°N 2.42164°W | | Late 17th century (probable) | Originally a farmhouse and cottage, later combined into one dwelling, it is in stone with quoins, a stone-slate roof, and three storeys. The building has a T-shaped plan, consisting of a three-bay main range and a rear outshut. On the front is a gabled porch with a datestone and a square-headed inner doorway, and to the left is another doorway with a canopy. Most windows are mullioned, and some have been altered. | II |
| West Scale; 54.34093°N 2.36005°W | | Late 17th century | A derelict farmhouse, without a roof, in sandstone with quoins. There are two storeys and two unequal bays. On the front are the remains of a two-storey porch, and at the rear the remains of a semi-cylindrical stair turret. On the front is a square-headed doorway, with another doorway above, two windows in each floor to the left, and to the right is an inserted doorway with a window above. All the windows were originally mullioned, those in the ground floor with moulded surrounds. | II |
| Badger Dub Cottage; 54.31044°N 2.42792°W | | Late 17th or early 18th century (probable) | A sandstone house with quoins and a slate roof. There are two storeys, three bays, and a lean-to extension on the left. In the centre is a porch containing stone benches and a square-headed inner doorway. There are two 20th-century cross-window casements in each floor, and another casement window in the upper floor. | II |
| Barn, East Rackenthwaite; 54.30768°N 2.41263°W | — | Late 17th or early 18th century (probable) | A sandstone barn with quoins and a stone-slate roof. It has a rectangular plan with six bays. On the front is a segmental-headed wagon entrance and a small window, and at the rear are a smaller doorway, a stable doorway, a loading door, and a blocked doorway. | II |
| Fea Fow; 54.34147°N 2.35008°W | | Late 17th or early 18th century (probable) | A farmhouse, later a private house, in sandstone with quoins and a stone-slate roof. There are two storeys, three bays, a prominent single-storey porch wing on the front, and a single-bay outbuilding on the left. In the porch is a square-headed doorway, most of the windows are mullioned, and there are some casement windows. | II |
| Garsdale Hall and attached barn 54.30065°N 2.39227°W | | Late 17th or early 18th century (probable) | A former farmhouse and barn, now derelict. They are in sandstone with quoins and stone-slate roofs. There are two storeys and a linear plan. The farmhouse has three bays with a rear extension, to the east is a two-bay extension or former cottage, and to the east of that is a five-bay barn. On the front of the farmhouse is a square-headed doorway with the low walls of a former porch, and windows, most of which are sashes. In the extension is a doorway with a massive lintel and mixed windows. The barn contains a square-headed wagon entrance doorways, external steps, a window, and two ventilation slits. | II |
| Kirk Bridge; 54.30160°N 2.39327°W | | Late 17th or early 18th century (probable) | The bridge carries the A684 road over the Clough River, and was widened in 1834. It is in limestone and sandstone, and consists of a single segmental arch. The bridge has voussoirs, a chamfered string course in stone-slate, and parapets that are coped with flat blocks and are splayed at the ends. The date "1834" is inscribed on a terminal pier. | II |
| Stable attached to Low House Farmhouse; 54.30186°N 2.40515°W | — | Late 17th or early 18th century (probable) | The former stable, which incorporates earlier fabric, is in stone with large quoins and a stone-slate roof. It has a rectangular plan, two storeys, probably two bays, windows, and a ball finial on the south gable. | II |
| Raygill Farmhouse; 54.30563°N 2.36107°W | — | Late 17th or early 18th century | A pair of farmhouses and a barn in sandstone with quoins and some through-stones. There are two storeys, five bays, and two doorways. Apart from one mullioned window, the windows have been altered. | II |
| Slack House and barn 54.30351°N 2.40675°W | | Late 17th or early 18th century | A farmhouse and barn, later a private house, in stone with quoins and a roof of slate with some stone-slate. The farmhouse has a rear outshut, a barn to the right, and another barn at right angles. The house has two storeys, four bays, a gabled porch, and windows with modern glazing. The barn to the right has through-stones, external steps leading to a loft door, and another doorway. The other barn has a wagon entrance with voussoirs, and in the outshut is a mullioned window. | II |
| West Little Town and barn 54.30378°N 2.37525°W | | Late 17th or early 18th century (probable) | The farmhouse and barn attached to the west are in stone with a stone-slate roof. The house has two storeys, three bays, and a rear outshut. On the front is a wide gabled porch with a square-headed outer doorway, pigeon holes with ledges in the gable, side benches, and a square-headed internal doorway. The windows are of varying types, including a stair window in the outshut. The barn has quoins, a rear outshut, doorways, and external steps to a loft door. | II |
| Low Scar and barn 54.31015°N 2.35258°W | — | 1724 | A farmhouse and barn, later combined into a house, the building is in stone with quoins, some through-stones, and a stone-slate roof. The house has two storeys, three bays, a gabled porch with a dated and initialled plaque in the gable, and mullioned windows, some of which are stepped. The barn has two doorway and a loft door, one doorway and the loft door converted into windows. | II |
| Badger Dub and stable or shippon 54.31053°N 2.42708°W | — | Early 18th century (probable) | A farmhouse and attached building, later a private house, in sandstone with quoins, and roofs partly of slate and partly of stone-slate. The house has three storeys, a symmetrical front of two bays, a receding rear wing to the right, and a projecting stable wing at the left. On the front is a porch, a square-headed doorway with a moulded surround, sash windows in the ground and middle floors, and small windows in the top floor. On the front of the stable wing is a doorway and a three-tier pigeon cote with ledges, and on the left wall are steps leading up to a doorway, and a window. Most of the windows in the rear wing are mullioned. | II* |
| Banks and barn 54.30612°N 2.36707°W | | Early 18th century (probable) | The former farmhouse and attached barn are in sandstone with stone-slate roofs. The building has a T-shaped plan, with a main range, a short gabled rear wing, and the barn continued to the left. The house has two storeys, three bays, a central square-headed doorway, a smaller doorway to the right, and fixed windows. The barn is long and lower, with a single-bay extension. It contains three doorways, small windows, one with some retained mullions, and square ventilation holes. | II |
| Barn, Clough Farm; 54.32319°N 2.33496°W | — | Early 18th century (probable) | The barn is in sandstone with quoins, some through-stones, and a slate roof with red ridge tiles. It has a rectangular plan with an extension to the east. The barn contains a segmental-headed wagon entrance with voussoirs, doorways, and two loft doors. | II |
| Hind Keld East; 54.31571°N 2.44356°W | | Early 18th century (probable) | The farmhouse and barn, later a private house, are in sandstone with quoins and stone-slate roofs. The house has three storeys, three bays, a low gabled porch with a datestone, and mullioned windows. The later barn, attached at the east end, has a doorway, windows, one of which is blocked, and one has a segmental head, and a skylight. | II |
| Hind Keld West; 54.31597°N 2.44482°W | — | Early 18th century (probable) | A farmhouse on a boulder plinth, with outbuildings, in stone with quoins and a stone-slate roof. The building has an L-shaped plan, consisting of a four-bay farmhouse, a rear outshut, and a store and outbuilding to the left. The house has two storeys, a porch, rectangular windows, and a fire window, the store has a doorway with a window above, and the single-storey outbuilding has a doorway and a rear extension containing a pigsty and a privy. | II |
| Lindsey Fold Farmhouse; 54.31344°N 2.43906°W | — | Early 18th century | A stone farmhouse on a plinth, with quoins and a slate roof. It has an L-shaped plan, with a two-bay main range, a single-bay extension to the right, an outshut at the rear, and another outshut in the angle. There are two storeys, a central doorway with a porch, sash windows, a fire window, and a blocked window. In the rear outshut is a mullioned stair window, now without its mullion. | II |
| Low Scale; 54.31672°N 2.33969°W | | Early 18th century (probable) | A farmhouse, cart shed and cottage in stone with quoins and a stone-slate roof. They form a linear plan, with a three-bay farmhouse, a single-bay cart shed to the left, and a single-bay cottage, which was added in the 19th century, on the right. The house and cottage have two storeys, the house has a gabled porch with a square-headed doorway, the cottage has a plain doorway, and the windows are sashes. The cart shed contains a large garage door. | II |
| Potgill House; 54.31369°N 2.46052°W | | Early 18th century (probable) | A former farmhouse in stone, partly rendered, with quoins, and roofs of stone-slate with some blue slate. It has two storeys and two bays, a large rear outshut, and a lean-to at the west. On the front is a square-headed doorway and casement windows, at the rear is an oblong window and a sash window, and in the lean-to is a fixed window. | II |
| Reachey Farmhouse; 54.33710°N 2.35094°W | | Early 18th century | The former farmhouse, with a barn to the right, is in sandstone with quoins, a stone-slate roof, and two storeys. On the front is a square-headed doorway, two small square windows to the left and one to the right, all with chamfered surrounds, and two widely separated windows in the upper floor. Over the upper floor windows is a continuous drip course. (Note: The photograph, taken in 2013, shows that the house has been restored, and the adjoining barn rebuilt.) | II |
| Barn, Swarth Gill; 54.30703°N 2.42119°W | — | Early 18th century | A threshing barn with a hay loft and shippon, it is in sandstone with through-stones and stone-slate roofs. The barn consists of a main range with outshuts to the rear, and contains wagon entrances, doorways, and ventilation slits. | II |
| Thrush Gill and barns 54.30328°N 2.39179°W | — | Early 18th century (probable) | The farmhouse with attached outbuildings is in stone on a plinth, with some through-stones and slate roofs. It consists of a farmhouse with two storeys, three bays and a short gabled rear wing. There is a stable and barn to the left, and a small shippon or store to the right. On the front is a tall single-storey gabled porch with a square-headed doorway and side benches. The windows are a mix of fixed windows, sashes, and a fire window. The stable has external steps leading to a loft door, and in the barn is a segmental-headed wagon entrance, a window and a doorway. | II |
| West Coat Weggs; 54.30365°N 2.37999°W | — | Early 18th century (probable) | A farmhouse, cottage and stable in one range, built in stone with quoins, some through-stones, and a stone-slate roof. The house has two low storeys, four bays, a rear outshut, and a wide gabled porch on the front. Most of the windows are casements. The cottage has two doorways and square windows, and the stable has two doorways and two windows. | II |
| Privy, Badger Dub; 54.31047°N 2.42690°W | — | 18th century (probable) | The privy is in sandstone with a stone-slate roof, and has a rectangular plan. It is built as a bridge over a stream. | II |
| Banks Bridge; 54.30572°N 2.36719°W | | 18th century (probable) | The bridge carries a road over Clough River. It is in sandstone, and consists of a single wide segmental arch. The bridge has voussoirs, a band, and parapets with round coping. | II |
| Barn south of Dandra Garth; 54.30212°N 2.38050°W | — | 18th century (probable) | A sandstone bank barn with quoins and a stone-slate roof. It has a rectangular plan, two low storeys, and probably three bays. On the front is a segmental wagon entrance with voussoirs, and a square-headed doorway, and at the rear is a loft doorway and two windows. | II |
| Barn southwest of Dandra Garth; 54.30205°N 2.38076°W | — | 18th century (probable) | The barn is in sandstone with quoins and a stone-slate roof with red ridge tiles. It has a rectangular plan with two low storeys. The barn contains two doorways, and two loading doors. | II |
| East Coat Weggs Bridge; 54.30438°N 2.37446°W | — | 18th century (probable) | The bridge carries a road over Clough River. It is in sandstone, and consists of a single segmental arch. The bridge has long voussoirs, a narrow humped deck, a band, and parapets with triangular coping stones on the east and concrete capping on the west. | II |
| Privy and store, East Rackenthwaite; 54.30773°N 2.41321°W | — | 18th century (probable) | This consists of two sandstone buildings with stone-slate roofs joined by a screen wall. The privy has a rectangular plan, the store is square, and they are sited over a stream. | II |
| Barn, Garsdale Hall; 54.30044°N 2.39271°W | — | 18th century (probable) | The barn is in sandstone with quoins, through-stones, and a stone-slate roof. It has a rectangular plan with probably five bays, and contains a segmental-headed wagon entrance with voussoirs, doorways, some of which are blocked, two loading doors, and ventilation slits. | II |
| Barn, Low House Farm; 54.30140°N 2.40492°W | | 18th century (probable) | A sandstone barn with through-stones, quoins and a stone-slate roof. It has three bays, and contains a segmental-headed wagon entrance with voussoirs, and another doorway with a lintel, altered to form a window. | II |
| Low House Bridge; 54.30140°N 2.40539°W | — | 18th century (probable) | The bridge carries a track over the Clough River. It is in sandstone and consists of a single segmental arch. The bridge has voussoirs, a stone-slate band, and iron railings replacing the former parapets. | II |
| Clough Farmhouse; 54.32307°N 2.33507°W | — | Mid to late 18th century (probable) | A sandstone farmhouse with quoins and a slate roof. There are two storeys and two bays. On the front is a wide gabled porch with two square-headed doorways. The windows on the front are sashes, and at the rear is a stair window and windows with altered glazing. | II |
| Smithy Chapel; 54.30047°N 2.39883°W | | 1830 | A Methodist chapel in stone, partly rendered, with quoins and a stone-slate roof. It has a rectangular plan and two low storeys. In the entrance front facing the road is a round-headed doorway with voussoirs, above which is an inscribed plaque. On the sides of the chapel are windows, most of which are sashes. | II |
| Coach house, Garsdale Hall; 54.30056°N 2.39214°W | — | Early to mid 19th century (probable) | The coach house, with living accommodation, is in sandstone with quoins and a stone-slate roof. It has a rectangular plan with two storeys and three bays. The building contains two segmental-headed wagon doorways, and in the third bay is a casement window in each floor. | II |
| Garsdale Street Chapel; 54.30153°N 2.38878°W | | 1841 | A Primitive Methodist chapel in sandstone with quoins and a stone-slate roof. It has a rectangular plan and consists of a single cell with a single storey. It has a symmetrical front with two windows and a central square-headed doorway. Above the door is a datestone. | II |
| Garden shelter, Low House; 54.30164°N 2.40535°W | — | 19th century (probable) | The shelter is in sandstone with a roof partly of stone-slate, and partly of flagstones. It has its back to the road, and an open front. Corners of the flagstones are cut out to accommodate two ball finials. | II |
| St John the Baptist's Church; 54.30089°N 2.39142°W | | 1860–61 | The church is in sandstone with freestone dressings and a slate roof, and is in Early English style. It consists of a nave with a south porch, and a chancel with a north vestry. On the west gable is a two-stage double bellcote. The windows are lancets. The porch has a coped gable with an apex cross. | II |
| Milestone; 54.31306°N 2.45922°W | — | Mid to late 19th century | The milestone on the A684 road is in cast iron, and has a triangular shaft and a flat-faced semicircular head. It is inscribed on the head with "SEDBERGH & HAWES ROAD", and on the faces are the distances in miles to Sedbergh and to Hawes. | II |
| Milestone; 54.31052°N 2.43574°W | — | Mid to late 19th century | The milestone on the A684 road is in cast iron, and has a triangular shaft and a flat-faced semicircular head. It is inscribed on the head with "SEDBERGH & HAWES ROAD", and on the faces are the distances in miles to Sedbergh and to Hawes. | II |
| Milestone; 54.30138°N 2.39449°W | — | Mid to late 19th century | The milestone on the A684 road is in cast iron, and has a triangular shaft and a flat-faced semicircular head. It is inscribed on the head with "SEDBERGH & HAWES ROAD", and on the faces are the distances in miles to Sedbergh and to Hawes. | II |
| Milestone; 54.30406°N 2.37332°W | | Mid to late 19th century | The milestone on the A684 road is in cast iron, and has a triangular shaft and a flat-faced semicircular head. It is inscribed on the head with "SEDBERGH & HAWES ROAD", and on the faces are the distances in miles to Sedbergh and to Hawes. | II |
| Milestone; 54.31042°N 2.35124°W | — | Mid to late 19th century | The milestone on the A684 road is in cast iron, and has a triangular shaft and a flat-faced semicircular head. It is inscribed on the head with "SEDBERGH & HAWES ROAD", and on the faces are the distances in miles to Sedbergh and to Hawes. | II |
| Milestone; 54.32052°N 2.33415°W | | Mid to late 19th century | The milestone on the A684 road is in cast iron, and has a triangular shaft and a flat-faced semicircular head. It is inscribed on the head with "SEDBERGH & HAWES ROAD", and on the faces are the distances in miles to Sedbergh and to Hawes. | II |
| Dandry Mire Viaduct; 54.32644°N 2.31898°W | | 1869–75 | The viaduct was built by the Midland Railway to carry the Settle–Carlisle line over Dandry Mire. It is in sandstone, slightly curved, and about 200 metres (660 ft) long. The viaduct consists of twelve segmental arches in groups of three, with rectangular piers, those between the groups and at the ends having broader pilasters. | II |
| Railway bridge 54.32816°N 2.31832°W | | 1869–75 | The bridge was built by the Midland Railway to carry the Settle–Carlisle line over the A684 road. It is in sandstone, and consists of a single segmental arch. The bridge has impost bands, voussoirs, terminal piers, a string course, and parapets with flat coping. In the abutments are segmental-headed blank arches. | II |
| Mill Bridge; 54.30766°N 2.35917°W | | Late 19th century | The bridge carries the A684 road over Clough River. It is in gritstone and consists of a single segmental arch. The bridge has voussoirs, parapets with flat copings and splayed ends, and terminal piers. | II |
| Scar Foot Bridge; 54.31021°N 2.35199°W | | Late 19th century (probable) | The bridge carries the A684 road over Clough River. It is in stone and consists of a single high segmental arch. The bridge has voussoirs, and parapets with rounded copings. | II |
| Boundary marker 54.32822°N 2.31818°W | — | After 1888 | The marker is at the boundary between the counties of North Yorkshire and Cumbria. It is in cast iron, with a triangular plan and is about 500 millimetres (20 in) high. On each face are images of pointing hands, and the names of historical districts. | II |
| Milestone; 54.32824°N 2.31814°W | — | After 1888 | The milestone on the A684 road is in cast iron, with a triangular plan and is about 500 millimetres (20 in) high. The side faces contain images of pointing hands and the distances in miles to Sedbergh and to Askrigg. The top is inscribed "ASKRIGG H D". | II |
| Garsdale Signal Box; 54.32169°N 2.32616°W | | 1910 | The signal box was built by the Midland Railway for the Settle–Carlisle line, and it stands on the north platform of Garsdale railway station. It is in timber and has a hipped Welsh slate roof with spike finials. The signal box has two storeys, three bays, and external steps leading to a doorway on the southwest front. Inside is a Midland Railways lever frame of 33 levers. | II |

== Notes and references ==
=== Sources ===
- Historic England, "East Rackenthwaite and adjoining barn, Garsdale (1384019)", National Heritage List for England
- Historic England, "High Scale Farmhouse with attached stable to west and barn to east, Garsdale (1384026)", National Heritage List for England
- Historic England, "East Scale Farmhouse with outbuilding attached to west, Garsdale (1384002)", National Heritage List for England
- Historic England, "Ben's Bridge (East Paradise), Garsdale (1384011)", National Heritage List for England
- Historic England, "Low House and barn attached to rear, Garsdale (1384032)", National Heritage List for England
- Historic England, "Birkrigg and attached barn to east, Garsdale (1384012)", National Heritage List for England
- Historic England, "Ingheads, Garsdale (1384029)", National Heritage List for England
- Historic England, "Bridge over Grisdale Beck approximately 50 metres east of East Scale Farmhouse, Garsdale (1384001)", National Heritage List for England
- Historic England, "Dandra Garth, Garsdale (1384014)", National Heritage List for England
- Historic England, "East Little Town, Garsdale (1384018)", National Heritage List for England
- Historic England, "Swarth Gill, Garsdale (1384051)", National Heritage List for England
- Historic England, "West Scale, Garsdale (1384005)", National Heritage List for England
- Historic England, "Badger Dub Cottage, Garsdale (1384007)", National Heritage List for England
- Historic England, "Barn approximately 10 metres south-east of East Rackenthwaite, Garsdale (1384020)", National Heritage List for England
- Historic England, "Fea Fow, Garsdale (1384003)", National Heritage List for England
- Historic England, "Garsdale Hall and attached barn to east, Garsdale (1384022)", National Heritage List for England
- Historic England, "Kirk Bridge, Garsdale (1384030)", National Heritage List for England
- Historic England, "Former stable attached to south-west corner of Low House Farmhouse, Garsdale (1384034)", National Heritage List for England
- Historic England, "Raygill Farmhouse, Garsdale (1384047)", National Heritage List for England
- Historic England, "Slack House and attached barn, Garsdale (1384049)", National Heritage List for England
- Historic England, "West Little Town and barn attached to west, Garsdale (1384055)", National Heritage List for England
- Historic England, "Low Scar and barn attached to east, Garsdale (1384038)", National Heritage List for England
- Historic England, "Badger Dub and stable or shippon attached to south-west, Garsdale (1384006)", National Heritage List for England
- Historic England, "Banks and attached barn to west, Garsdale (1384010)", National Heritage List for England
- Historic England, "Barn approximately 4 metres north of Clough Farmhouse, Garsdale (1384057)", National Heritage List for England
- Historic England, "Hind Keld East, Garsdale (1384027)", National Heritage List for England
- Historic England, "Hind Keld West, Garsdale (1384028)", National Heritage List for England
- Historic England, "Lindsey Fold Farmhouse, Garsdale (1384031)", National Heritage List for England
- Historic England, "Low Scales, Garsdale (1384037)", National Heritage List for England
- Historic England, "Potgill House, Garsdale (1384046)", National Heritage List for England
- Historic England, "Reachey Farmhouse, Garsdale (1384004)", National Heritage List for England
- Historic England, "Barn 30 metres north-east of Swarth Gill House, Garsdale (1384052)", National Heritage List for England
- Historic England, "Thrush Gill and attached barns to east and west, Garsdale (1384053)", National Heritage List for England
- Historic England, "West Coat Weggs, Garsdale (1384054)", National Heritage List for England
- Historic England, "Privy approximately 5 metres east of Badger Dub, Garsdale (1384008)", National Heritage List for England
- Historic England, "Banks Bridge, Garsdale (1384009)", National Heritage List for England
- Historic England, "Barn approximately 30 metres south of Dandra Garth, Garsdale (1384015)", National Heritage List for England
- Historic England, "Barn approximately 60 metres southwest of Dandra Garth, Garsdale (1384016)", National Heritage List for England
- Historic England, "East Coat Weggs Bridge, Garsdale (1384017)", National Heritage List for England
- Historic England, "Privy and store approximately 5 metres south-west of East Rackenthwaite, Garsdale (1384021)", National Heritage List for England
- Historic England, "Barn approximately 25 metres south-west of Garsdale Hall, Garsdale (1384023)", National Heritage List for England
- Historic England, "Barn on east side of entrance to Low House farm, Garsdale (1384033)", National Heritage List for England
- Historic England, "Low House Bridge, Garsdale (1384036)", National Heritage List for England
- Historic England, "Clough Farmhouse, Garsdale (1384056)", National Heritage List for England
- Historic England, "Smithy Chapel to south-east of Blades, Garsdale (1384050)", National Heritage List for England
- Historic England, "Coach-house opposite Garsdale Hall, Garsdale (1384024)", National Heritage List for England
- Historic England, "Garsdale Street Chapel, Garsdale (1384025)", National Heritage List for England
- Historic England, "Garden shelter approximately 50 metres south-west of Low House, Garsdale (1384035)", National Heritage List for England
- Historic England, "Church of St John the Baptist, Garsdale (1384013)", National Heritage List for England
- Historic England, "Milestone (Sedbergh 3) approximately 10 metres east of Nether House, Garsdale (1384039)", National Heritage List for England
- Historic England, "Milestone (Sedbergh 4) approximately 20 metres west of Bellow Hill turn, Garsdale (1384040)", National Heritage List for England
- Historic England, "Milestone (Sedbergh 6) approximately 75 metres west of Kirk Bridge, Garsdale (1384041)", National Heritage List for England
- Historic England, "Milestone (Sedbergh 7) approximately 10 metres west of East Little Town, Garsdale (1384042)", National Heritage List for England
- Historic England, "Milestone (Sedbergh 8) approximately 5 metres east of Scar Foot Bridge, Garsdale (1384043)", National Heritage List for England
- Historic England, "Milestone (Sedbergh 9) approximately 250 metres east of Harding Bridge, Garsdale (1384044)", National Heritage List for England
- Historic England, "Dandrymire Viaduct, Garsdale (1384058)", National Heritage List for England
- Historic England, "Railway Bridge approximately 200 metres north of Dandrymire Viaduct, Garsdale (1384059)", National Heritage List for England
- Historic England, "Mill Bridge to north-east of Raygill, Garsdale (1384045)", National Heritage List for England
- Historic England, "Scar Foot Bridge, Garsdale (1384048)", National Heritage List for England
- Historic England, "Boundary marker at county boundary of North Yorkshire and Cumbria, Garsdale (1131992)", National Heritage List for England
- Historic England, "Milestone immediately east of boundary marker, Garsdale (1131993)", National Heritage List for England
- Historic England, "Garsdale Signal Box, Garsdale (1412055)", National Heritage List for England
- Historic England, Listed Buildings
- Leach, Peter; Pevsner, Nikolaus (2009), Yorkshire West Riding: Leeds, Bradford and the North, The Buildings of England, New Haven and London: Yale University Press, ISBN 978-0-300-12665-5
