= Bear Park, North Yorkshire =

Listed building in North Yorkshire, England

Coordinates: 54°17′44″N 1°59′32″W

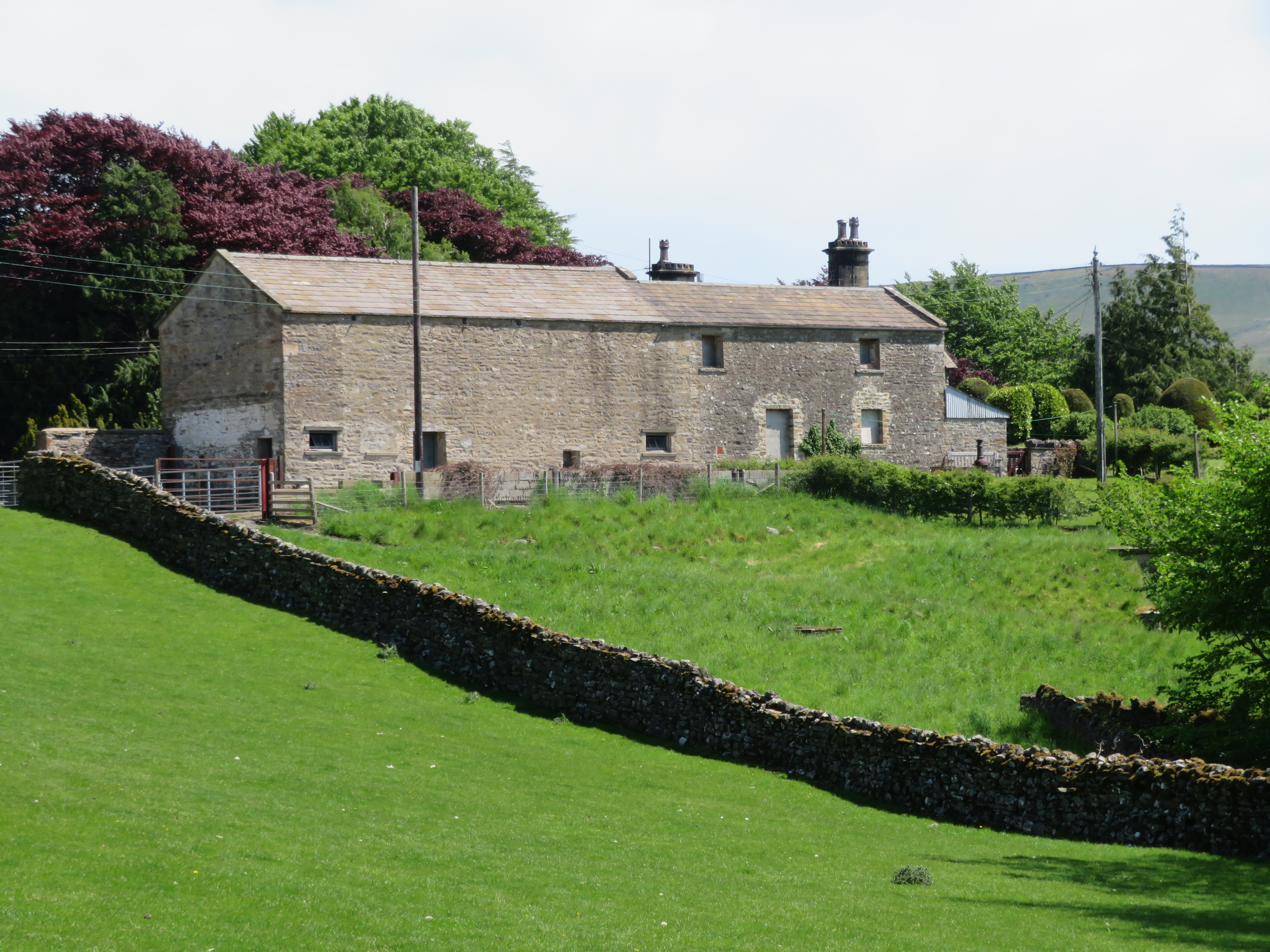
Outbuildings at Bear Park

Bear Park is a manor house and estate in Carperby, a village in Wensleydale in England.

A house existed on the site in the Mediaeval period, when it was owned by Marrick Priory. It was sold in 1544, and by 1570 was owned by Ambrose Dudley, 3rd Earl of Warwick. At the time, the estate had a stone hall and various outbuildings, surrounded on three sides by walls, and the other by the River Ure. The current building dates from the 17th century, although it may contain elements of the earlier house. It has been much altered, particularly in the 19th century. It was Grade II* listed in 1952.

The house is built of stone and has a stone slate roof with coped gables. It has two storeys and an E-shaped plan. The south front has five bays, and contains a doorway with a fanlight, a Tudor arched head and a hood mould. The windows are mullioned and double-chamfered with hood moulds. At the ends, the gable of each cross-wing contains an oculus with a moulded surround and keystones. In the centre of the rear is a single-storey gabled porch containing a doorway with a quoined surround, a moulded arris and a Tudor arched head. To the right of the porch is a stone slab carved with the Arma Christi, said to have come from Coverham Abbey. Inside the house, the dining room has 17th-century panelling with a frieze and moulded beams and joists in the ceiling. The sitting room has a small fireplace which dates from the 17th century or perhaps earlier, and the old kitchen has a large 17th-century fireplace. Beside the kitchen fireplace is a stone spiral staircase, with a cavity below which may have been a priesthole.

Next to the house is a garden, surrounded by a 19th-century stone wall, which has been extended to accommodate a tennis court. There is also a mid-19th century grotto, constructed of artificial stone.

== See also ==
- Grade II* listed buildings in North Yorkshire (district)
- Listed buildings in Carperby-cum-Thoresby
