= Castle Dykes Henge =

Neolithic henge in North Yorkshire, England

- North Yorkshire, England, UK
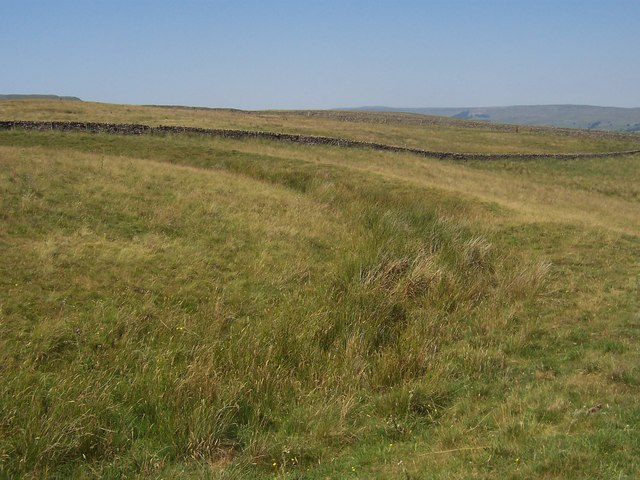
- Castle Dykes Henge

Location
- Location in North Yorkshire
- Coordinates: 54.281245°N 2.028721°W
- Grid reference: SD98238728

Castle Dykes Henge is a Class I Neolithic henge earthwork in the Yorkshire Dales National Park in North Yorkshire, England, situated between the villages of Aysgarth and Thornton Rust. It consists of a roughly circular bank approximately 87 yards (80 m) in diameter with an internal ditch.

It is reported that excavation work took place in 1908, though there is little physical evidence of this as the henge appears to be mostly intact. In 2015 the Royal Archaeological Institute awarded a research grant for a survey of the site and palaeoenvironmental sampling.
