= Listed buildings in Carperby-cum-Thoresby =

Carperby-cum-Thoresby is a civil parish in the county of North Yorkshire, England. It contains seven listed buildings that are recorded in the National Heritage List for England. Of these, one is listed at Grade II*, the middle of the three grades, and the others are at Grade II, the lowest grade. The parish contains the village of Carperby-cum-Thoresby and the surrounding countryside. The most important building in the parish is Bear Park, a former manor house, which is listed together with a grotto in its grounds. The other listed buildings are in the village, and consist of a village cross, a farmhouse, a pair of cottages, and a chapel and a meeting house, both converted for residential use.

== Key ==
Grade	Criteria
II*	Particularly important buildings of more than special interest
II	Buildings of national importance and special interest

== Buildings ==
Name and location	Photograph	Date	Notes	Grade
Bear Park; 54.29553°N 1.99209°W	—	17th century	A manor house in stone that has a stone slate roof with coped gables. There are two storeys and an E-shaped plan. The south front has five bays, and contains a doorway with a fanlight, a Tudor arched head and a hood mould. The windows are mullioned and double-chamfered with hood moulds. At the ends, the gable of each cross-wing contains an oculus with a moulded surround and keystones. In the centre of the rear is a single-storey gabled porch containing a doorway with a quoined surround, a moulded arris and a Tudor arched head.	II*
Carperby Market Cross; 54.30320°N 1.99183°W		1674	The village cross is in sandstone, and has an octagonal tapering shaft on a base of seven square steps. On the arms of the cross are recessed square panels, and on the top is a panel containing initials. The date is on the arms, and on the ends are face masks in bas-relief.	II
West End Farmhouse; 54.30290°N 1.99344°W	—	1772	A farmhouse and outbuilding under one roof, in stone with quoins, a stone slate roof, and two storeys. The farmhouse has three bays. The central doorway has a stone surround with splayed bases, and a lintel inscribed with initials and the date, and a basket-arched soffit. The windows are sashes with tooled sills and lintels. The outbuilding to the right has one opening in each floor.	II
Quaker Cottages; 54.30334°N 1.99245°W	—	Early 19th century	A pair of cottages in stone with a stone slate roof. There are two storeys and attics, and two bays. On the front are two gabled porches, sash windows in the ground floor, combined sash and casement windows in the upper floor, and casements in the returns.	II
West Lea Cottage; 54.30294°N 1.99367°W	—	1826	A chapel, later a Sunday school, and then a private house, it is in stone with quoins and a stone slate roof. There are two storeys and two bays. The central doorway has a stone surround with splayed bases, above it is an inscribed and dated panel, and the windows are casements.	II
Grotto, Bear Park; 54.29550°N 1.99241°W	—	Mid 19th century	The grotto consists of an artificial cave formed of blocks of tufa-like stone. It has a single storey.	II
Former Friends Meeting House; 54.30332°N 1.99274°W		1864	The former meeting house is in stone with a Westmorland slate roof. There are two storeys and fronts of three bays. The entrance front has a pedimented gable on a moulded string course. It contains a central doorway with chamfered rusticated quoins and a divided fanlight, and sash windows. In the tympanum of the pediment is an inscribed and dated panel.	II
