= Joel Walker (sculptor) =

English sculptor

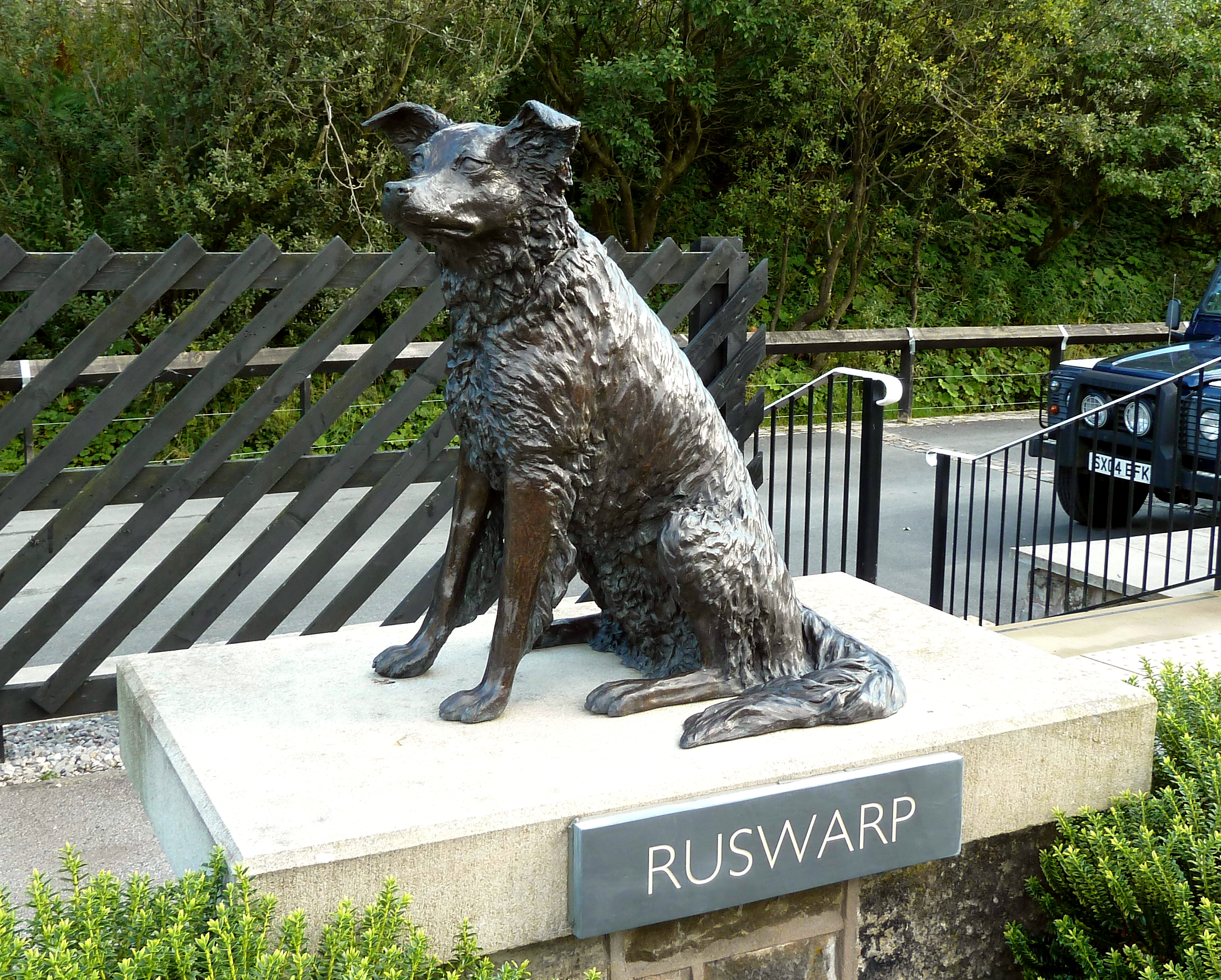
Statue of Ruswarp at Garsdale

Joel (Jo) Walker, also known as JOEL or Sculptress JOEL, is an English sculptor, known for depicting animals.

In 2008 she was commissioned to make a statue of the dog Ruswarp for Garsdale railway station on the Settle–Carlisle line. She was chosen for her detailed work, and portraits of animals. This project attracted the attention of the media including the national press.

She has won prizes for her work including the Gift of the Year award 1994 (Collectibles and Figurines). Her work is generally figurative in style, capturing the detailed expressions and attributes of her subjects. Most sculptures are cast by the lost-wax process into Bronze.

Her sculptures have also been used by different societies as awards and trophies, and in the past she has specialized in the portraits of famous breeds of horses, such as the Shire horse and Shetland ponies. This led to the commission of the centenary sculptures for the Welsh Pony and Cob Society.

Another sculpture by the Sculptress JOEL of a famous equestrian subject is that of Lady Godiva. She is shown to be riding out on her quest for justice, her head lifted up, one hand holding the mane of the fine Spanish stallion and her other hand gripping the folds of her fallen cloak.
