= Garsdale =

Village and civil parish in Cumbria, England

Coordinates: 54.301°N 2.391°W

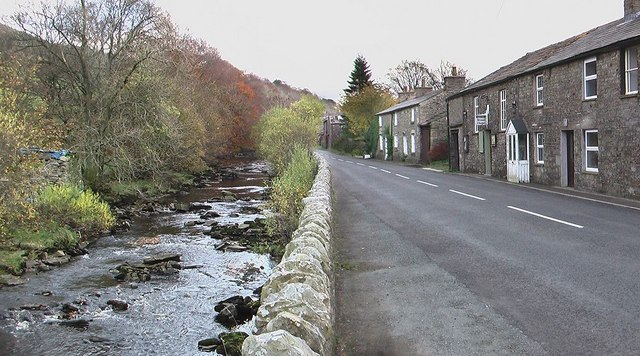
- Garsdale

- Location in South Lakeland Location within Cumbria
- Population: 191 (2011)
- OS grid reference: SD7489
- Civil parish: Garsdale
- Unitary authority: Westmorland and Furness
- Ceremonial county: Cumbria
- Region: North West
- Country: England
- Sovereign state: United Kingdom
- Post town: SEDBERGH
- Postcode district: LA10
- Dialling code: 015396
- Police: Cumbria
- Fire: Cumbria
- Ambulance: North West
- UK Parliament: Westmorland and Lonsdale

Garsdale is a dale in the south-east of Cumbria, England. It lies within the Westmorland and Furness local government district and in the Yorkshire Dales National Park for planning purposes; it was historically a part of the West Riding of Yorkshire. In the 2001 census, the parish had a population of 202, decreasing to 191 in 2011.

== History ==
Historically, Garsdale was a chapelry in the ancient parish of Sedbergh in the Ewecross wapentake, in the West Riding of Yorkshire. In 1866, it became a separate civil parish. From 1894 to 1974, it was part of Sedbergh Rural District; it became part of the new county of Cumbria in 1974.

== Location ==
Garsdale lies on the western slopes of the Pennines, between Baugh Fell to the north and Rise Hill to the south. It is within the Yorkshire Dales National Park. The dale is the valley of the Clough River, which rises on the north eastern slopes of Baugh Fell and flows through Grisedale, the Dale that Died, as Grisedale Beck until it becomes the Clough River at Garsdale Head.

The dale forms the civil parish of Garsdale, although the last mile and a half of the course of the Clough river, before its confluence with the Rawthey, is part of the parish of Sedbergh. Small settlements lie along the main Northallerton to Kendal road (the A684) which runs through the dale for 7 miles (11 km), with frequent bridges in the upper part of the dale. The largest settlement, known as "The Street", lies 6 miles (9.7 km) east of Sedbergh and 10 miles (16 km) west of Hawes. The other hamlet in Garsdale is Garsdale Head, also called Hawes Junction, the old name for Garsdale station, after the former Wensleydale branch on the Settle to Carlisle railway.

At Longstone Fell, locally known, and spoken as Langst'n Fell, the A684 road rises to a well-known view-point looking over the Howgill Fells, and the river descends to Danny Bridge, the site of a 17th-century mill on the "old road", before joining the River Rawthey near Sedbergh. The Sedgwick Trail, named after the well-known geologist Adam Sedgwick runs along the Clough from Danny Bridge and highlights rock features along the Dent Fault.

Garsdale is host to the Wild Garsdale Pike charity which aims at enhancing the land for nature, restoring the peat bog and providing young people an opportunity to gain experience in conservation work.

== Governance ==
Garsdale is part of the Westmorland and Lonsdale parliamentary constituency, of which Tim Farron is the current MP representing the Liberal Democrats.

Garsdale has its own parish council: Garsdale Parish Council.

== Churches ==
The Anglican Church of St John the Baptist, built in 1861 next to the original medieval church, lies 6 miles (9.7 km) from Sedbergh, between The Street and Garsdale Hall, which was once an inn but is now used as a farm store. There are also three Methodist chapels: Low Smithy and Garsdale Street, both in regular use, and Hawes Junction which has occasional special events.

== Farming ==
Garsdale has numerous working farms, most of them amalgamating several of the original smallholdings. Due to the high annual rainfall of up to 100 inches (2,500 mm), crops other than hay and silage are almost impossible, so all farms are stock rearing. Pedigree Swaledale rams occasionally make high prices at Hawes auction mart.

== Transport ==
Garsdale railway station is a stop on the Settle and Carlisle line. Northern Trains operates services between Leeds, Settle and Carlisle approximately every two hours.

The Little White Bus operates the 113 route; four services a day run to Hawes and Gayle.

== Ruswarp ==
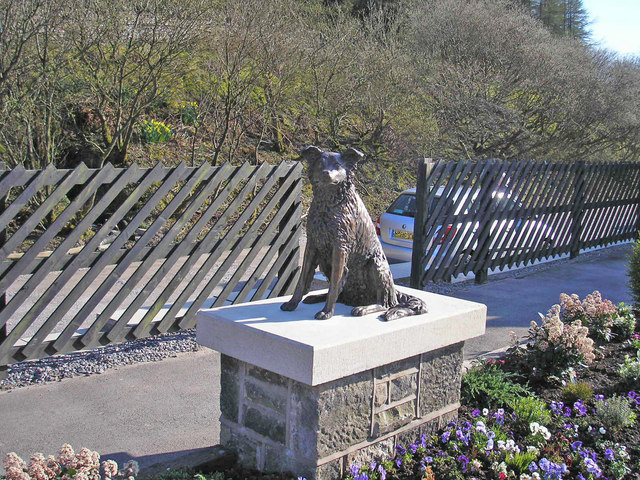
Statue of Ruswarp at Garsdale station

A statue of Ruswarp, a collie, stands at Garsdale station. Ruswarp belonged to Graham Nuttall, the first Secretary of the Friends of the Settle–Carlisle Line, which was formed to campaign against the proposed closure of the line. Ruswarp's paw print was put on his own objection as a fare-paying passenger. The line was finally saved in 1989.

In January 1990, Nuttall and Ruswarp went missing in the Welsh mountains. On 7 April 1990, a lone walker found Nuttall's body by a mountain stream. Nearby was Ruswarp, so weak that the 14-year-old dog had to be carried off the mountain. He had stayed with his master's body for 11 winter weeks. The Royal Society for the Prevention of Cruelty to Animals awarded Ruswarp their Animal Medallion and collar for 'vigilance' and their Animal Plaque for 'intelligence and courage'. He survived long enough to attend Nuttall's funeral. The statue by Joel Walker was unveiled in 2009.

== Notable people ==
Famous people born in Garsdale include:

- John Dawson (1734–1820), surgeon
- John Haygarth (1740–1827), physician
- James Inman (1776–1859), astronomer.

== See also ==
- Listed buildings in Garsdale
