= Carperby =

Village in North Yorkshire, England

Coordinates: 54°18′15″N 1°59′21″W

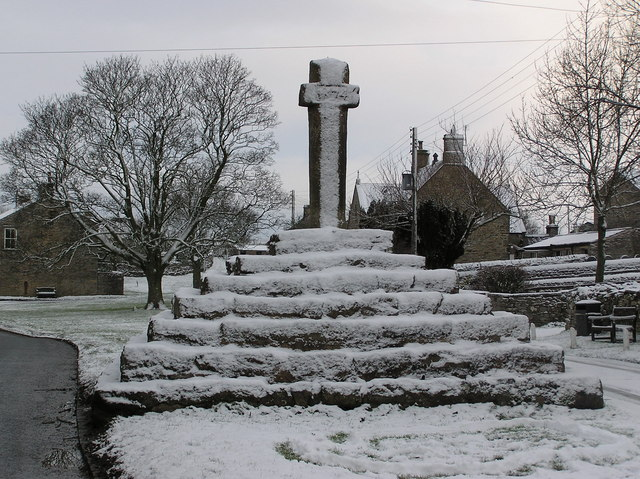
- Carperby Market Cross

- Location within North Yorkshire
- OS grid reference: SE005896
- Civil parish: Carperby-cum-Thoresby
- Unitary authority: North Yorkshire
- Ceremonial county: North Yorkshire
- Region: Yorkshire and the Humber
- Country: England
- Sovereign state: United Kingdom
- Police: North Yorkshire
- Fire: North Yorkshire
- Ambulance: Yorkshire

Carperby is a village in Wensleydale, one of the Yorkshire Dales in North Yorkshire, England. It lies 7 miles (11 km) west of Leyburn.

== Etymology ==
The derivation of the villages name is uncertain, but Ekwall believes it to mean 'Cairpe's settlement' in Old Norse (Cairpes bȳ). The name Cairpe is of Old Irish origin, implying Norse-Gaelic settlement in the area.

== History ==
In the centre of the village is a Carperby Market Cross, dated 1674, that tells of the time when Carperby had a market (granted in 1305). In the 17th century the village was an important Wensleydale centre of Quakerism, and its biggest building even today is the classically styled Carperby Quaker Meeting House of 1864. In 1810, the western end of the village supposedly suffered from a fire which destroyed 12 thatched cottages. Whilst there is no documentary evidence of this, it is a locally believed legend and mapping from 1819 and 1856 does show at least nine dwellings as having been removed.

The Richmond to Lancaster Turnpike was opened up through the village in 1751. Later diversions meant that the main A684 road was diverted to run through Aysgarth. The minor road that now runs through Carperby shadows the A684 westwards along the valley until the two roads meet at Hardraw. The road through Carperby is colloquially known as 'The High Road'. The name of the Wheatsheaf Hotel suggests a corn-growing past, and the inn itself was where James Herriot and his bride spent their honeymoon in 1941.

In 2004, the village launched a campaign to provide a sports pavilion for its football team which plays in the Wensleydale Creamery League. After years of events and fundraising, the effort was still far short of its goal when the Mars confectionery company donated money to the final £125,000 needed to construct the pavilion. The building of the pavilion was filmed in a time-lapse and used by Mars as a TV advertisement which also had footballer Peter Crouch playing on the pitch at Carperby.
