= Hawes railway station =

Disused railway station in North Yorkshire, England

Hawes
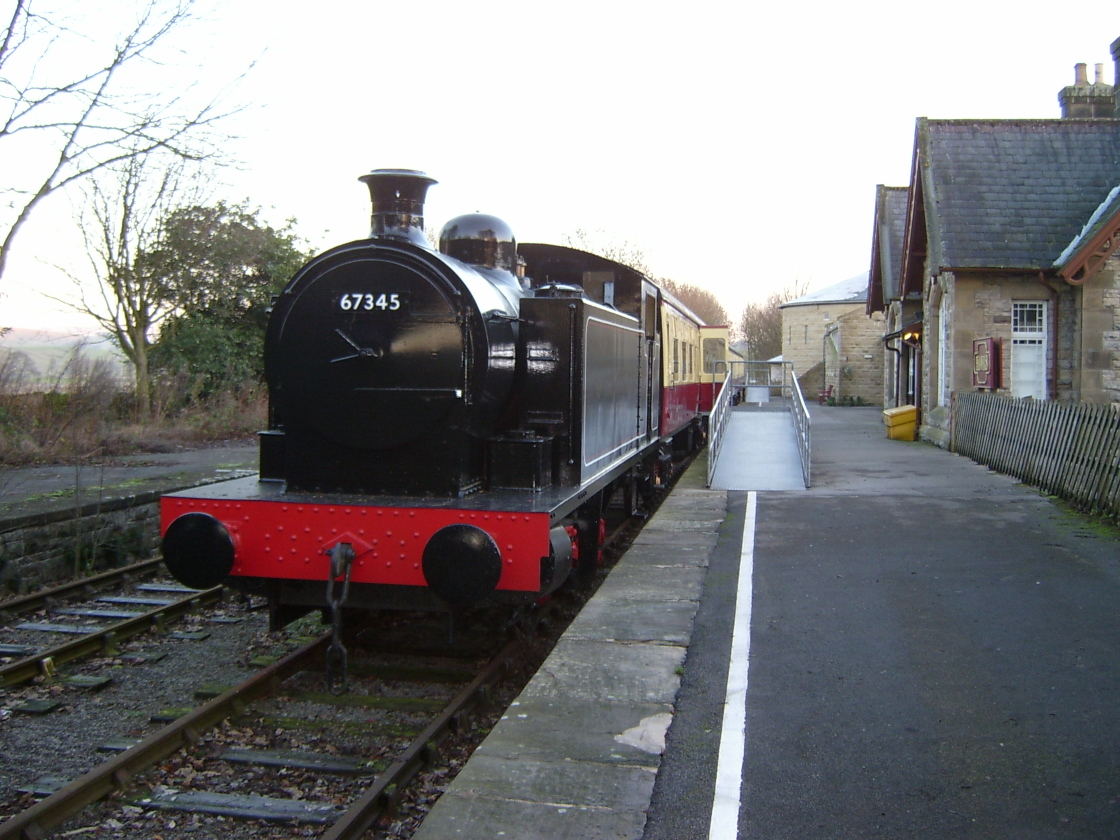

General information
- Location: Hawes, North Yorkshire; England
- Coordinates: 54.3047°N 2.1929°W
- Grid reference: SD875899
- System: Station on heritage railway
- Platforms: 2

History
- Original company: Midland Railway
- Pre-grouping: Midland Railway
- Post-grouping: London, Midland and Scottish Railway

Key dates
- 1 October 1878: Opened
- 16 March 1959: Closed to passengers
- April 1964: Closed to goods traffic
Location

Hawes railway station served the town of Hawes, in North Yorkshire, England. The station was owned and operated jointly by the Midland Railway and the North Eastern Railway, being at either end of the railways from Garsdale (Hawes Junction) and Northallerton (the Wensleydale Line). It was closed to passengers in 1959, although freight continued until 1964, and the station buildings now form part of the Dales Countryside Museum.

== History ==
The station was opened to goods traffic in June 1878 by the North Eastern Railway (NER), with the Midland Railway (MR) following on in August 1878, as the terminus of their 6-mile (10 km) branch line from Hawes Junction. Passenger traffic by both companies started on 1 October 1878. The MR branch made an end-on junction there with the NER line from Northallerton via Bedale, which had been opened as far as Leyburn by 1856 and then extended onwards to Hawes in the summer of 1878. Although the station belonged to the Midland, the NER (and later the London and North Eastern Railway) operated most of the passenger services from there — the MR section being worked as an extension of the service to/from Northallerton. The only exception to this was a single daily return service between Hawes and Hellifield that for much of its life was known by the nickname Bonnyface. The station operated as a Joint station between the Midland and the North Eastern, one of six joint stations that the NER were involved with. (Note: The other five stations that the NER operated jointly were; Holbeck, Leeds (New), Tebay, Normanton and Penrith.)

The station building was on the south side of the two running lines, with a smaller waiting shelter on the north side. Both buildings were built with sandstone, and the main building was finished with Welsh blue slate. All of the structures were built to a Midland Railway design (described as being "typical of the Midland Derby Gothic style"), but of note is that the three-arch overbridge at the west end of the station carried an NER numberplate signifying that they were responsible for the bridge. Besides the two platforms with through lines, there was a siding line on the south side which ended in a cattle dock beside the main station building, and from the siding were four west sidings which had an east-facing junction. The four sidings were set out in pairs, with a wide section separating the two to allow carts in-between them. The southernmost siding had a stone dock, which exported locally quarried sandstone; over 15,000 tonnes (17,000 tons) was taken out by freight wagons in 1879, most by the Midland Railway. The Railway Clearing House listing for Hawes shows that it could handle livestock, horses, general freight, passengers and parcels, and it was equipped with a crane capable of lifting 5 tonnes (5.5 tons).

The NER section of the line lost its passenger service in April 1954, but the station retained a nominal service of one train each way from Hawes Junction (by then renamed Garsdale) until final closure to passengers on 16 March 1959. Goods traffic from the Leyburn direction continued until complete closure in April 1964, after which the track was lifted and the buildings left to fall into disrepair.

Disused railways
Terminus	North Eastern Railway	Askrigg; Line and station closed
Garsdale; Line closed, station open	Midland Railway; Hawes Branch	Terminus
Preceding station	Heritage railways	Following station
Proposed extension
Garsdale Terminus	Wensleydale Railway	Askrigg towards Leeming Bar

== The site today ==
After many years of disuse, the site was purchased by the Yorkshire Dales National Park Authority and converted into a museum and tourist information centre in the early 1990s, a role it continues to fulfil to this day. As part of this scheme, the station buildings and platforms were refurbished, with a short length of track relaid. A preserved industrial tank locomotive, painted in British Railways colours, together with a pair of Mark 1 coaches, were installed as a static exhibit. The station buildings now form part of the Dales Countryside Museum, and since 2015, the museum has rented the building to a business operating a bike shop and, later, a cafe.

Although isolated from the national rail network for over half a century, the Wensleydale Railway hopes to eventually reopen the currently abandoned and derelict section of line between Redmire and Garsdale; this would involve restoring the station to its former glory and active use. However, the train with three carriages which currently resides in the platform would not have to be removed as the campaigners stated that ".. the branch line would not completely take over the station and its other uses could remain."
