= Aysgarth =

Village and civil parish in North Yorkshire, England

Coordinates: 54.29046°N 1.99444°W

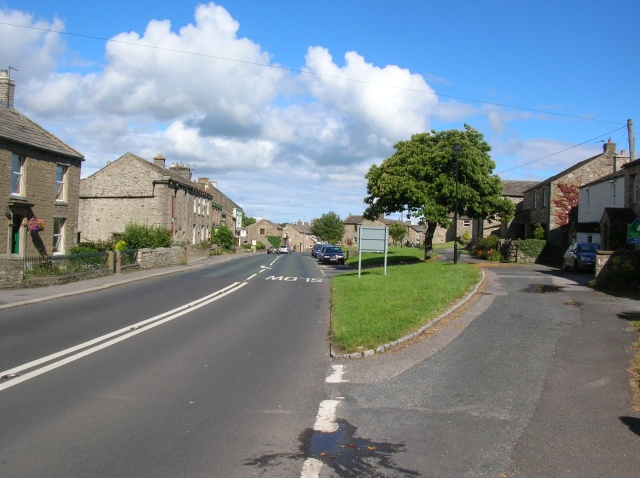
- Aysgarth

- Location within North Yorkshire
- Population: 178 (2011 census)
- OS grid reference: SE004883
- Unitary authority: North Yorkshire
- Ceremonial county: North Yorkshire
- Region: Yorkshire and the Humber
- Country: England
- Sovereign state: United Kingdom
- Post town: LEYBURN
- Postcode district: DL8
- Dialling code: 01969
- Police: North Yorkshire
- Fire: North Yorkshire
- Ambulance: Yorkshire
- UK Parliament: Richmond and Northallerton

Aysgarth is a village and civil parish in Wensleydale, in North Yorkshire, England. The village is in the Yorkshire Dales National Park, about 16 miles (26 km) south-west of Richmond and 22.6 miles (36.4 km) west of the county town of Northallerton.

== History ==
Evidence of prehistoric activity has been recorded in the parish, including a Bronze Age burial.

The village is mentioned in the Domesday Book of 1086 as Echescard. The toponymy is derived from the combination of the Old Norse words eiki, meaning oak, and skarð, which may mean open space, cleft or mountain pass, so the probable meaning is Oak tree cleft, referring to the valley cut by the River Ure.

At the time of the Norman Conquest, the manor was held by Cnut, son of Karli. Afterwards the manor was in the possession of Count Alan of Brittany, who granted lordship to Geoffrey of Swaffham. By the 13th century, the manor was in the hands of the Burgh family of Hackforth. The manor descended with the manor of Hackforth until 1480, at which time they were conveyed to the Crown in the person of Richard, Duke of Gloucester. Some lands in the manor in the 13th century came into the hands of the lords of Middleham and then followed the descent of the manor of Thoralby.

The village's railway station, part of the Hawes Branch of the North Eastern Railway, opened in 1878 and closed in April 1954.

== Governance ==
The parish lies within the Richmond and Northallerton UK Parliament constituency. From 1974 to 2023 it was part of the district of Richmondshire. It is now administered by the unitary North Yorkshire Council.

The civil parish shares a grouped parish council with the civil parishes of Bishopdale, Newbiggin, Thoralby and Thornton Rust, known as Aysgarth & District Parish Council.

== Geography ==
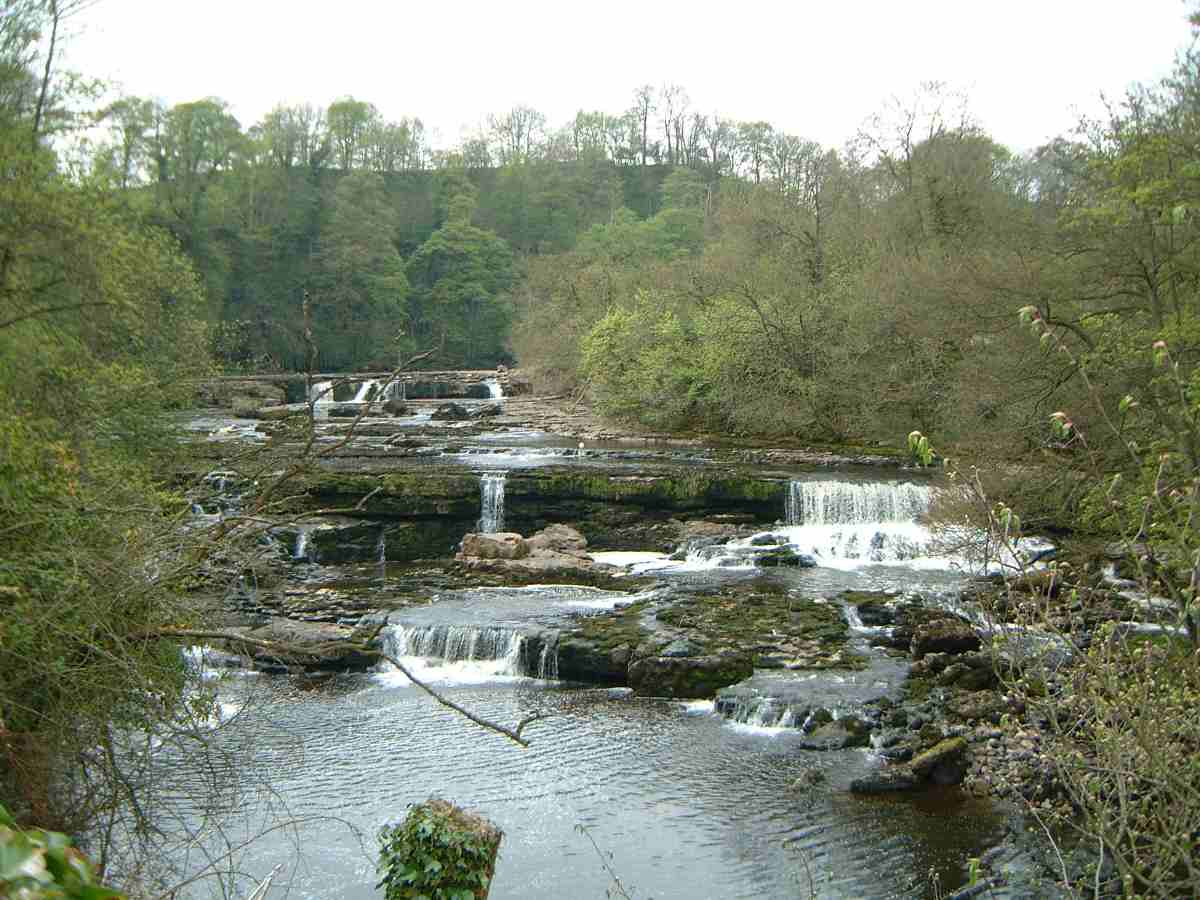
Aysgarth Falls (Upper)

The village lies along the A684 road near the south bank of the River Ure. The nearest settlements are Carperby to the north, Thoralby to the south-west and West Burton to the south-east, all within 1 mile (1.6 km) of the village. Aysgarth & District Parish Council is bordered by the Parishes of Bainbridge, Askrigg and Low Abbotside, Carperby cum Thoresby, Burton cum Walden and Buckden.

=== Aysgarth Falls ===
This is a triple flight of waterfalls on the River Ure over a one-mile stretch. The falls are fast-flowing, especially during wet weather, as thousands of gallons of water cascade over the series of broad limestone steps. Aysgarth Falls is a popular tourist attraction and has been the subject of works by Ruskin, Turner and Wordsworth, who all visited the area. The upper fall was featured in the 1991 film Robin Hood: Prince of Thieves.

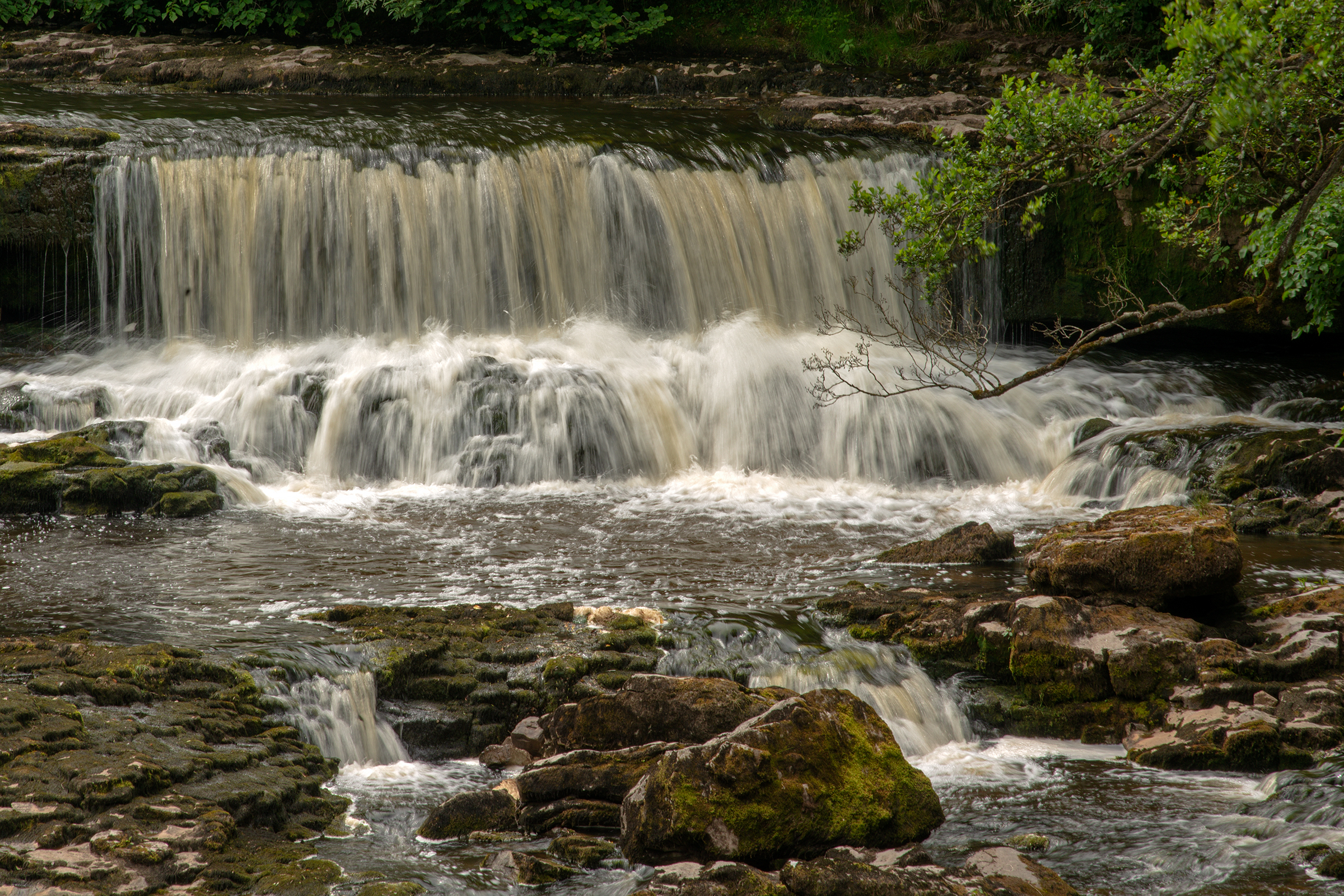
A portion of the upper falls

=== Castle Dykes Henge ===
To the west of the village is a Neolithic earthwork called Castle Dykes Henge. It is a scheduled monument.

== Demography ==
Population
Year	1881	1891	1901	1911	1921	1931	1951	1961	2001	2011
Total	370	235	273	279	290	299	259	196	197	178

=== 2001 census ===
The 2001 UK census showed that the population was split 48.7% male to 51.3% female. The religious constituency was made of 73.5% Christian, 1.5% Jewish and the rest stating no religion or not stating at all. The ethnic make-up was 98.5% White British and 1.5% White other. There were 100 dwellings.

=== 2011 census ===
The 2011 UK census showed that the population was split 48.9% male to 51.1% female. The religious constituency was made of 67.4% Christian, 1.7% Jewish, 0.6% Buddhist and the rest stating no religion or not stating at all. The ethnic make-up was 99.5% White British and 0.5% each White Other. There were 136 dwellings.

== Culture and community ==
There are a few local businesses in Aysgarth, and gift shops for tourists. There is a Youth Hostel near the falls. To the east of the village is a caravan and lodge park. A Gulf fuel station in Aysgarth is operated by Penny Petroleum.

=== Public houses ===
There are two public houses in the village, The George and Dragon Inn and the Aysgarth Falls Hotel, which was the Palmer Flatt Hotel until 2010. The bar here was known as the Miner's Arms and as such was listed along with the George in Baines' Directory of 1823.

The George and Dragon dates from the 17th century when it was a coaching inn and is now a Grade II listed building. Local real ale from the Black Sheep Brewery and the Yorkshire Dales Brewing Company is served. It was among the top 30 nominees to be Yorkshire's Favourite Pub 2015, an event organised by Welcome to Yorkshire. The Aysgarth Falls Hotel was listed in the 2016 competition.

=== Transport ===
A regular bus service operates between Bedale and Hawes. On Sundays a year-round DalesBus service operates between Northallerton and Hawes. There are three DalesBus routes that call at the village in the summer season. A bus service operates between Darlington College and Askrigg.

The Wensleydale Railway Association has plans to rebuild the railway from Northallerton (from its current western terminus at Redmire) to Garsdale and re-open Aysgarth railway station.

=== Medical care ===
Medical care is available at The Health Centre's surgery. Three doctors serve this office and the one in Hawes. The nearest hospitals are Friary Hospital in Richmond (13.0 miles (20.9 km)) and New Richardson Hospital at Barnard Castle (17.9 miles (28.8 km)).

== Religion ==
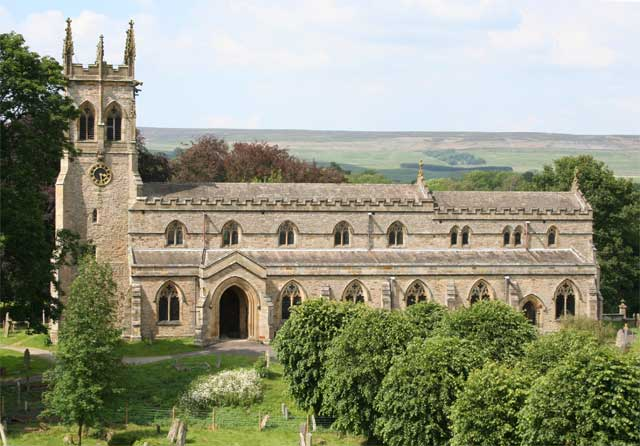
St Andrew's Church, Aysgarth

St. Andrew's Church in Aysgarth was substantially rebuilt in 1536 and restored in 1866. It is now a Grade II* listed building. The unusually large churchyard extends to about four acres. The church preserves a number of fittings that were rescued from Jervaulx Abbey at the time of the Dissolution of the Monasteries, including a rood screen and the abbot's stall.

The Wesleyan and Primitive Methodists both had chapels in the village: only the Wesleyan chapel is still in use. The Society of Friends (the Quakers) had a meeting house.

== See also ==
- Listed buildings in Aysgarth
