= Garsdale railway station =

Railway station in Cumbria, England

Garsdale
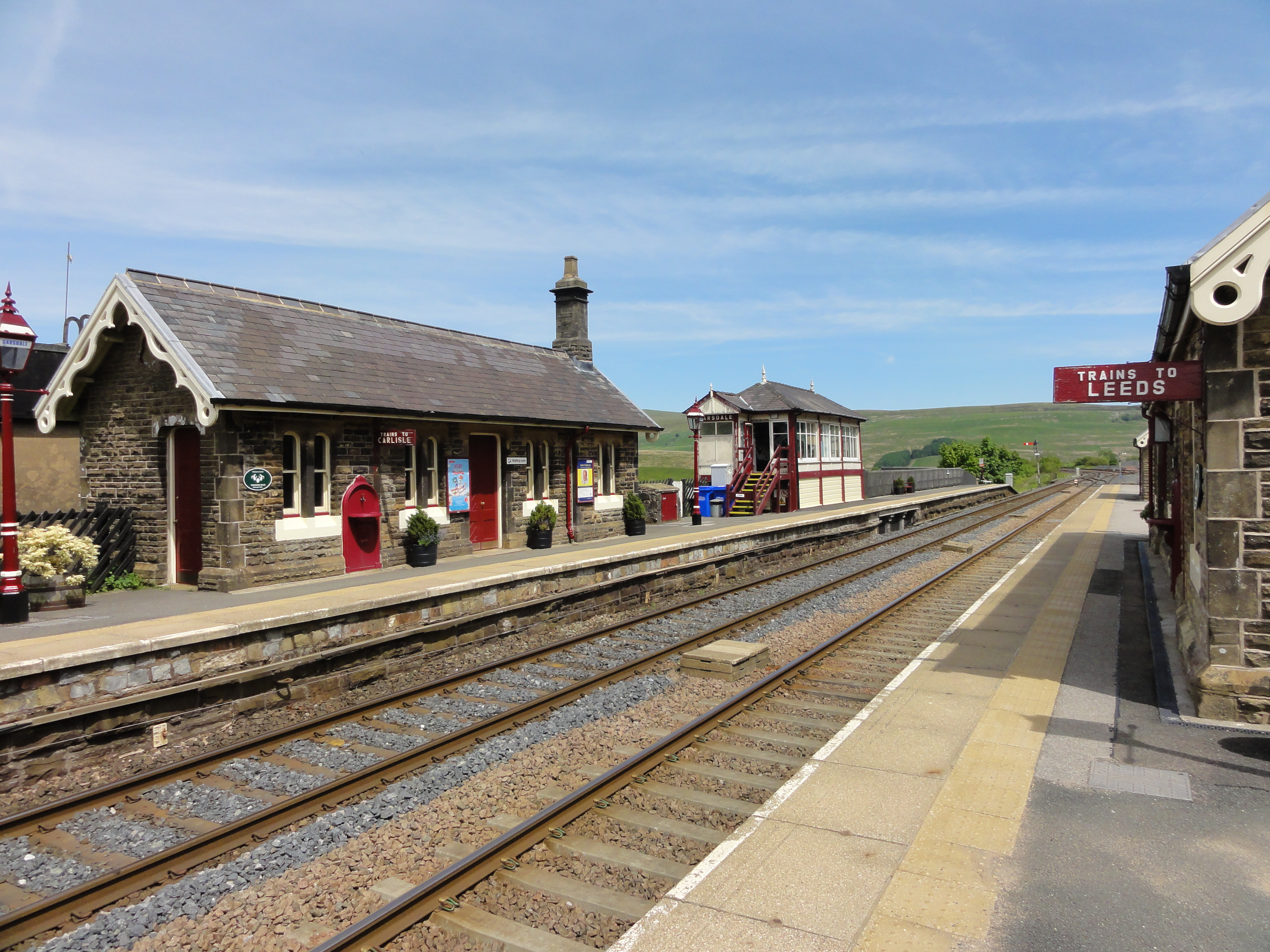

General information
- Location: Garsdale Head, Westmorland and Furness; England
- Coordinates: 54°19′17″N 2°19′35″W
- Grid reference: SD788918
- Owner: Network Rail
- Manager: Northern Trains
- Platforms: 2
- Tracks: 2

Other information
- Station code: GSD
- Classification: DfT category F2

History
- Original company: Midland Railway
- Pre-grouping: Midland Railway
- Post-grouping: London, Midland and Scottish Railway; British Rail (London Midland Region)

Key dates
- 1 August 1876: Opened as Hawes Junction
- 20 January 1900: Renamed Hawes Junction and Garsdale
- 1 September 1932: Renamed Garsdale
- 4 May 1970: Closed
- 14 July 1986: Reopened

Passengers
- 2021/22: ▲12,424
- 2022/23: ▲14,494
- 2023/24: ▲15,112
- 2024/25: ▲17,054
- 2025/26: ▲18,360
Location
- Location within the former South Lakeland district Location within Cumbria
Notes
- Passenger statistics from the Office of Rail and Road

Garsdale is a railway station in Cumbria, England (historically in the West Riding of Yorkshire until 1974), on the Settle and Carlisle Line, which runs between Carlisle and Leeds via Settle. The station, situated 51 miles 29 chains (82.7 km) south-east of Carlisle, serves the village of Garsdale and town of Sedbergh in Cumbria, and the market town of Hawes in North Yorkshire. It is owned by Network Rail and managed by Northern Trains.

== History ==
The station was designed by the Midland Railway's company architect John Holloway Sanders, though not in the same style as used elsewhere on the route. It opened on 1 August 1876 as Hawes Junction.

Adjoining the station are sixteen railway cottages, which were built for its employees by the Midland Railway around 1876, the year the Settle-Carlisle Line opened. A further six cottages were added near to the Moorcock Inn soon afterwards. In the days of steam-hauled London-Scotland expresses, the locality once boasted the highest water troughs in the world (just along the line at Ling Gill, at an altitude of 1,140 feet (350 m) above sea level). These were removed just before the end of steam traction on British Rail in 1968. Unusually, the station waiting room was once used for Anglican church services, and the railway turntable had a wall of sleepers built around it to prevent locomotives being spun by strong winds; this happened in 1900 and was the inspiration for the story "Tenders and Turntables" in the book Troublesome Engines in The Railway Series by Rev W. Awdry. A single-road locomotive shed was located to the south of the station; although built by the Midland railway, it was used by the North Eastern Railway for services on the Wensleydale Railway.

The Hawes Junction rail crash of 1910 occurred near to the station, which was originally named Hawes Junction, as it was the junction of a branch line to Hawes. This line was closed in March 1959, though it is the long-term aim of the Wensleydale Railway to extend their rails along the former route from Redmire to connect with services here, allowing through journeys to Northallerton on the East Coast Main Line. The signal box (opened just a few months before the Christmas 1910 accident) on the northbound platform is still in use today. It is Grade 2-listed and underwent a three-month refurbishment in 2021.

=== Statue of Ruswarp ===
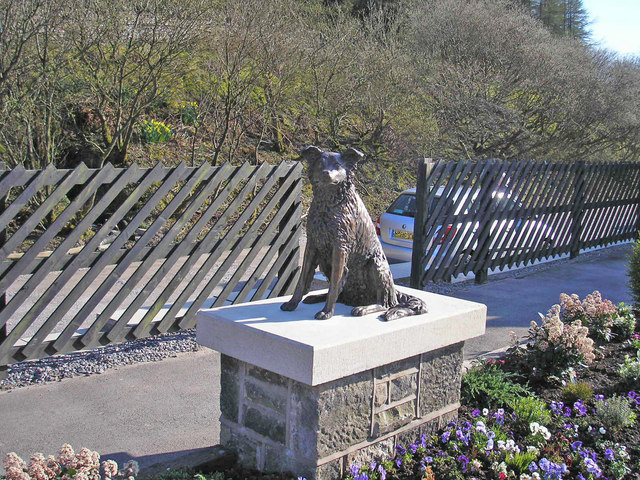
Statue of Ruswarp at Garsdale station in April 2009

The southbound platform features a life-size bronze statue of a Border Collie dog named Ruswarp (pronounced /rʌsəp/). Ruswarp belonged to Graham Nuttall, one of the founding members of the group that saved the Settle-Carlisle Railway from closure. The dog was featured in the campaign, signing the petition to save the line with a paw-print. Nuttall disappeared while walking with Ruswarp in the Welsh Mountains on 20 January 1990. His body was found on 7 April; Ruswarp was still alive after standing guard over his owner's body for 11 weeks and died shortly after attending the funeral.

The sculpture by Joel Walker is a memorial to both Graham Nuttall, Ruswarp and the campaign to save the line from closure. It was unveiled on 11 April 2009, 20 years after the line was saved from closure. The station waiting rooms, previously out of use due to leaking roofs, were also refurbished and reopened to the public as part of the ceremony.

== Facilities ==
The station is unstaffed, but waiting rooms are available on each platform and toilets on the southbound platform. There is no link between the platforms and the northbound platform is not easily accessible for disabled passengers, although there are no steps and the surface is not metalled and is uneven. Tickets must be bought in advance or on the train, as no ticket machines are available. Train running information can be obtained from timetable posters and the customer information screens and there is a public address system.

A bus service to and from Hawes connects with selected train departures each day.

== Signal box ==
The signal box, a 4c type as designed and built by the Midland Railway Company, was installed in June 1910 and is made from timber with a Welsh slate roof. It was given grade II listed status in 2013. The box was significant in the 1910 Hawes Junction crash, which led to the introduction of track circuits to prevent that type of tragedy happening again. Its heritage status was awarded partly due to its involvement in the accident.

In June 2020, Network Rail applied to the Yorkshire Dales National Park Authority to carry out repairs on the decaying structure. Refurbishment began in June 2021 and was completed in December 2021.

== Services ==
Garsdale has seen a modest improvement in service levels in recent years, with an extra morning and evening service in each direction. This brings the service level up to that seen at various other stations on the route (such as Appleby), namely eight trains each way on weekdays and Saturdays, with five each way on Sundays.

The DalesRail Sunday service that formerly called here in summer no longer operates due to a lack of available train crews to operate it. Connections for the replacement Saturdays-only "Yorkshire Dales Explorer" services to/from Manchester Victoria can be made at Ribblehead.

Preceding station	National Rail	Following station
Dent	Northern Trains; Settle and Carlisle Line	Kirkby Stephen
	Disused railways	
Terminus	Midland Railway; Hawes Branch	Hawes
Historical railways
Dent	Midland Railway; Settle and Carlisle Line	Kirkby Stephen
Preceding station	Heritage railways	Following station
Proposed extension
Terminus	Wensleydale Railway	Hawes towards Leeming Bar

== See also ==
- Listed buildings in Garsdale
