= Otterington Bridge =

Bridge in North Yorkshire, England

Coordinates: 54°16′55″N 1°25′59″W

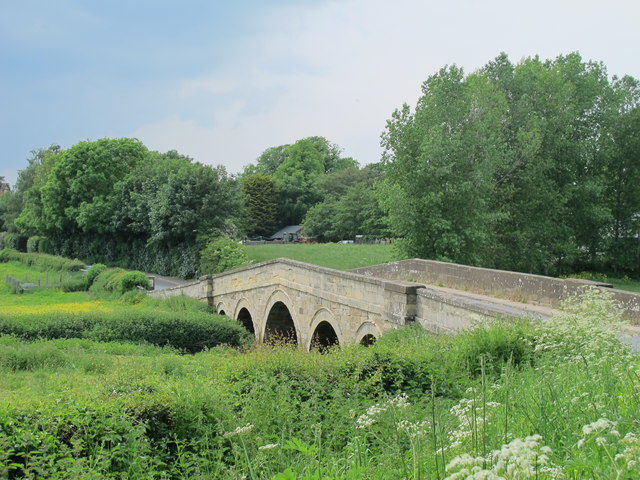
The bridge, in 2016

Otterington Bridge is a historic structure connecting South Otterington and Newby Wiske, villages in North Yorkshire, in England.

The bridge, across the River Wiske, was constructed to carry the main road from Northallerton to Boroughbridge. It was designed by John Carr and was completed in 1776. The construction cost £680. The bridge was grade II listed in 1987.

The bridge is built of stone and consists of five segmental arches, the middle arch larger, with voussoirs and hood moulds. By the ends of the bridge are pilaster buttresses, and the parapet is coped.

== See also ==
- Listed buildings in Newby Wiske
- Listed buildings in South Otterington
