= Otterington =

Otterington may refer to:

- Otterington railway station, formerly located in the village of South Otterington, North Yorkshire, on the East Coast Main Line
- South Otterington, a village in North Yorkshire, England
- North Otterington, a village in North Yorkshire, England.
- Otterington (horse), winner of the St Leger Stakes in 1812
