= Listed buildings in South Otterington =

South Otterington is a civil parish in the county of North Yorkshire, England. It contains six listed buildings that are recorded in the National Heritage List for England. All the listed buildings are designated at Grade II, the lowest of the three grades, which is applied to "buildings of national importance and special interest". The parish contains the village of South Otterington and the surrounding countryside. The listed buildings consist of houses, a bridge, a church, and a former railway station and signal box.

== Buildings ==
Name and location	Photograph	Date	Notes
Newsham Grange; 54.29312°N 1.43936°W	—	Early 18th century	A farmhouse in red brick, with floor bands, an eaves band, and a two-span pantile roof with stone coping and kneelers, shaped on the left. There are two storeys, a double depth plan, and five bays. In the centre is a porch, most of the windows are sashes and others are blind.
South Otterington Bridge; 54.28208°N 1.43304°W		1776	The bridge carries a road over the River Wiske, and was designed by John Carr. It is in stone, and consists of five segmental arches, the middle arch larger, with voussoirs and hood moulds. By the ends of the bridge are pilaster buttresses, and the parapet is coped.
Otterington Hall; 54.29071°N 1.42782°W	—	Early 19th century	The house is in red brick, with a dentilled cornice, and roofs in stone slate and Welsh slate, hipped over the three middle bays, and over the outer bays. There are two storeys, three bays, the middle bay projecting slightly, and later outer bays. In the centre is a semicircular porch with two Greek Doric half-columns and pilasters, a frieze and a cornice, and a doorway with a fanlight. The windows are sashes, some tripartite, and all have flat stuccoed arches with keystones.
The Old Rectory; 54.28202°N 1.43138°W	—	1834	The house is in red brick with stone dressings, on a plinth, with a sill band, and a hipped tile roof with oversailing eaves. There are two storeys and two bays. In the centre is a Doric porch with two pilasters and two columns, a frieze, a cornice and a blocking course. The windows are sashes, and at the rear is a stair window with dated pointed arch.
St Andrew's Church; 54.28241°N 1.43114°W		1844–47	The church, designed by Anthony Salvin in Neo-Norman style, is in stone with a stone slate roof. It consists of a nave, a north aisle, a south porch, a chancel and a west tower. The tower has three stages, clasping buttresses, a round-arched light in the middle stage, a south clock face, two-light bell openings under a larger round arch, a Lombard frieze, and a hipped pyramidal roof.
Otterington railway station 54.28532°N 1.41658°W		1932	The railway station was built by the London and North Eastern Railway and was closed in 1958, since when it has been used for other purposes. It is in red brick with dressings in artificial stone, and has a hipped tile roof with overhanging eaves. There is a single storey and five bays, a plinth, pilasters and a sill band. The windows have steel frames and are a mix of casements and fixed lights. The central doorway has a pediment. To the south is a signal box, and to the east is a weighbridge office. The platform has been cut back on track side, and has two lamp posts.
