= Listed buildings in Newby Wiske =

Newby Wiske is a civil parish in the county of North Yorkshire, England. It contains 13 listed buildings that are recorded in the National Heritage List for England. All the listed buildings are designated at Grade II, the lowest of the three grades, which is applied to "buildings of national importance and special interest". The parish contains the village of Newby Wiske and the surrounding countryside. Most of the listed buildings are houses, farmhouses and cottages, and the others are a chapel, a bridge and a village pump.

== Buildings ==
Name and location	Photograph	Date	Notes
Newby Wiske Hall; 54.28245°N 1.43892°W		17th century	A country house, largely rebuilt in about 1851, and later used for other purposes. It is rendered, with stone dressings and has Welsh slate roofs. The main front has two storeys and attics, eleven bays, the outer bays projecting, with a lower two-storey four-bay wing to the right, and later rear additions. The main block has a plinth, a floor band, a frieze, a cornice and blocking course, and a hipped roof. In the centre is a two-storey porch with a round-arched opening, pilasters, an architrave and a keystone, above which is a small balcony. The windows on the lower two floors of the middle nine bays are sashes with architraves, those on the middle floor also with friezes and cornices, and on the top floor they are casements with architraves. The outer bays have rusticated ground floors, and quoins. The windows on the ground floor are tripartite with Doric pilasters, a frieze and a cornice, and on the middle floor are Venetian windows with Ionic pilasters, friezes, cornices and keystones.
Home Farm; 54.28166°N 1.43565°W		Late 17th century	The building, which has been divided into two, is in red brick with stone dressings and a pantile roof. There are two storeys and seven bays. In the right bay is a projecting gabled porch with quoins, and a doorway with a moulded architrave, a pulvinated frieze, a keystone and a broken pediment with egg and dart moulding. The gable has decorative bargeboards and a finial. The left three bays contain a doorway and sash windows, some horizontally-sliding, and to the right are external brick and stone steps leading to an upper floor doorway. Further to the right is a floor band and slit vents. In the right return is a canted bay window, above which is a mullioned window and a gable similar to that on the porch.
Cherry Tree House; 54.28434°N 1.43788°W	—	Mid-18th century	The house is in red brick, with rusticated stone quoins, a floor band, dentilled eaves, and a pantile roof with shaped kneelers and brick coping. There are two storeys and two bays. The central doorway has an architrave and a fanlight, and the windows are sashes with stone sills and stuccoed flat arches.
Malt House and Rosebank; 54.28447°N 1.43742°W	—	Mid to late 18th century	A house divided into two, in red brick, with a dentilled floor band on the left, a dentilled eaves band and a machine-tile roof with brick coping on the left. There are two storeys and six bays. To the left is a doorway with a Doric surround and a pediment. The windows are sashes, those in the left bay with architraves and stuccoed flat arches.
Sowber Gate Farmhouse; 54.29404°N 1.44991°W		Mid to late 18th century	The farmhouse is in red brick with a dentilled eaves band and a hipped pantile roof. There are three storeys and six bays, and a later recessed extension. On the ground floor are three canted bay windows with sashes, friezes and cornices. The upper floors contain sash windows in pairs with flat brick arches.
6 Main Street; 54.28456°N 1.43751°W	—	Late 18th century	The house is in red brick with a floor band, a dentilled eaves band, and a machine-tile roof with brick coping on the left gable. There are two storeys and three bays. The central doorway has an architrave and a fanlight, and above it is a tiled canopy and a blind window. The other windows are 20th-century casements.
Ivy Cottages; 54.28377°N 1.43684°W	—	Late 18th century	Two, later three, cottages in red brick with a dentilled eaves band and a pantile roof. There are two storeys and six bays, the left three bays projecting slightly. In the centre of these is a doorway, above it is a blind window, and there is a doorway in the fourth bay with a fanlight. The windows are a mix of casements and horizontally-sliding sashes, and all have flat brick arches.
North Sowber Farmhouse; 54.29855°N 1.45642°W	—	Late 18th century	The farmhouse is in red brick on a plinth, with an eaves band, a pantile roof with shaped kneelers, and coping in brick and stone. There are two storeys and two bays, and a lower two-bay wing to the left. In the centre of the main block is a doorway with a flat brick arch. The windows in the main block are sashes and in the wing they are casements.
Pear Tree Cottage, Rose Cottage and The Cottage; 54.28525°N 1.43805°W	—	Late 18th century	A row of three cottages in red brick with a floor band, an eaves band and a pantile roof. There are two storeys and eight bays. On the front are three doorways, and the windows are a mix of casements, and horizontally-sliding sashes. All the openings have flat back arches.
South Otterington Bridge; 54.28208°N 1.43304°W		1776	The bridge carries a road over the River Wiske, and was designed by John Carr. It is in stone, and consists of five segmental arches, the middle arch larger, with voussoirs and hood moulds. By the ends of the bridge are pilaster buttresses, and the parapet is coped.
Methodist Chapel; 54.28429°N 1.43722°W		1814	The chapel is in red brick, with a floor band, paired gutter brackets, and a hipped Welsh slate roof. There are two storeys and a front of three bays. In the middle bay is a full-height recessed round-arch containing a round-arched doorway with a rusticated surround and a keystone, above which is an inscribed stone panel. The windows are sashes with round-arched heads.
Limehurst; 54.28402°N 1.43700°W	—	Early 19th century	The house is in red brick, and has a pantile roof with stone coping on the right. There are two storeys and two bays. The central doorway has an architrave and a fanlight, and the windows are horizontally-sliding sashes.
Pump; 54.28422°N 1.43754°W		1848	The pump in front of the village school has a wooden case, a straight wrought iron handle and a lead spout. In front of it is a rectangular trough in Yorkshire stone, with rounded corners, and a drain hole at the base.
