= St Luke's Church, Winmarleigh =

Coordinates: 53.9252°N 2.8070°W

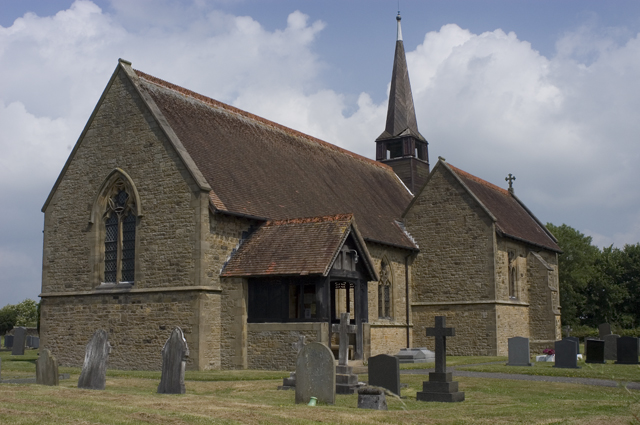

- Location in the Borough of Wyre
- OS grid reference: SD 47105 47978
- Location: Winmarleigh, Lancashire
- Country: England
- Denomination: Anglican
- Website: St Luke, Winmarleigh

History
- Status: Parish church
- Founded: 1875

Architecture
- Functional status: Active
- Heritage designation: Grade II
- Designated: 9 January 1986
- Architect: Paley and Austin
- Architectural type: Church
- Style: Gothic Revival
- Groundbreaking: 1875
- Completed: 1887

Administration
- Province: York
- Diocese: Blackburn
- Archdeaconry: Lancaster
- Deanery: Lancaster and Morecambe
- Parish: Winmarleigh St Luke

Clergy
- Vicar: Revd Gary Lewis

St Luke's Church is in the village of Winmarleigh, Lancashire, England. It is an active Church of England parish church in the Diocese of Blackburn, the archdeaconry of Lancaster, and the deanery of Lancaster and Morecambe. The church was built in 1875–1876 by Paley and Austin, and is recorded in the National Heritage List for England as a designated Grade II listed building.

== History ==
Winmarleigh is a village in Lancashire. Historically, it was part of the ecclesiastical parish of Garstang and Winmarleigh's villagers would have worshipped at the parish church of St Helen, Churchtown. St Luke's was built in 1875–1876 by the Lancaster-based firm of architects Paley and Austin. Located to the south of the village, the church was paid for by Lord Winmarleigh. It was enlarged in 1887 by the same architects, who added a north aisle and a vestry.

== Architecture ==
St Luke's is constructed of sandstone rubble and has a roof of red tiles. Its plan consists of a nave, a chancel, a porch to the south, and a chapel and a vestry to the north. There is no tower, but there is a wooden bell-cote with a spire between the nave and chancel. The church incorporates elements of Decorated and Perpendicular styles.

== External features ==
The churchyard contains a mausoleum dedicated to the Reddaway family of Winmarleigh Hall. Built in 1927, it features a cross and kneeling figure in white marble. It also contains the war grave of a King's Liverpool Regiment soldier of World War I.

== Assessment and administration ==
St Luke's was designated as a Grade II listed building on 26 July 1951. It is an active parish church in the Anglican Diocese of Blackburn, which is part of the Province of York. It is in the archdeaconry of Lancaster and the Deanery of Lancaster and Morecambe. The church is in the parish of Winmarleigh St Luke which forms part of the benefice of Cockerham with Winmarleigh and Glasson.

== See also ==
- Listed buildings in Winmarleigh
- List of ecclesiastical works by Paley and Austin
