= NST =

NST may refer to:

== Health ==
- Nonstress test, a screening test used in pregnancy test

== Media ==
- Niigata Sogo Television, a television company in Niigata Prefecture, Japan
- New Straits Times, an English-language newspaper published in Malaysia
- New Sabah Times, a newspaper in Sabah, Malaysia
- Real Scary Television (Russian: Настоящее страшное телевидение), a television channel in Russia

== Military ==
- Naval Security Team, a deployable Royal Canadian Navy (RCN) force protection unit tasked to augment fleet existing force protection measures in expeditionary or domestic environments.

== Science and engineering ==
- National Research Council of Science and Technology, a research group under the Ministry of Science and ICT
- National Standard Thread, a thread form used on fire hose couplings in the USA
- Natural Sciences Tripos, a courses system of the University of Cambridge
- Neon-sign transformer, a high voltage transformer
- Neural Style Transfer, a non-realistic rendering technology

== Time zones ==
- National Standard Time, Taiwan
- Nepal Standard Time
- Newfoundland Standard Time

== Transportation ==
- Nakhon Si Thammarat Airport, Thailand, IATA code

== Other uses ==
- NST (company), UK travel group
- Network Security Toolkit, a live Linux CD
- New standard tuning for guitar
- Nintendo Software Technology, a video game company
- Niue Soccer Tournament, top association football league in Niue
- Non-sellable token, a type of scam seen in cryptocurrency
- State of East Sumatra (Negara Sumatera Timur), a former federal state
