= St Andrew's Church, South Otterington =

Church in South Otterington, North Yorkshire, England

Coordinates: 54°16′57″N 1°25′52″W

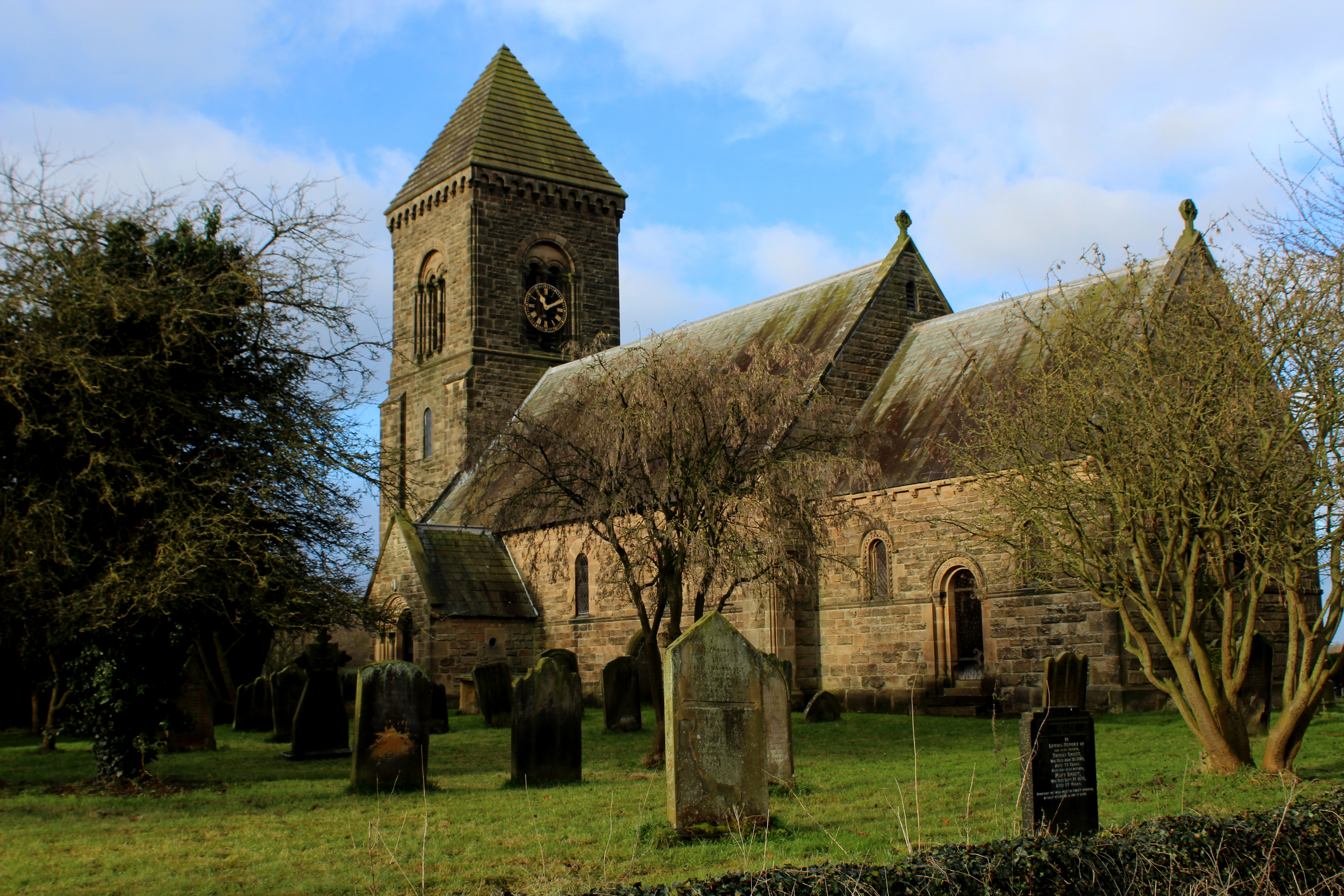
The church, in 2018

St Andrew's Church is the parish church of South Otterington, a village in North Yorkshire, in England.

A church was built in South Otterington in the Norman period, and it was rebuilt in the late 17th century. The church only had space for ten pews, and in 1847 it was completely rebuilt, to a Neo-Norman design by Anthony Salvin. The construction was funded by William Rutson of Newby Wiske Hall, and cost £6,000. The new building was much larger, and had space for 300 worshippers. An organ was installed in 1899, stained glass was installed in 1907, and a lychgate was constructed in 1986. The building was grade II listed in 1987.

The church is built of stone with a stone slate roof. It consists of a nave, a north aisle, a south porch, a chancel and a west tower. The tower has three stages, clasping buttresses, a round-arched light in the middle stage, a south clock face, two-light bell openings under a larger round arch, a Lombard frieze, and a hipped pyramidal roof. Inside, the pulpit and reading desk are in the neo-Norman style, and there is a damaged mediaeval font in the north aisle.

== See also ==
- Listed buildings in South Otterington
