= Appleton Wiske =

Village and civil parish in North Yorkshire, England

Coordinates: 54°26′11″N 1°23′57″W

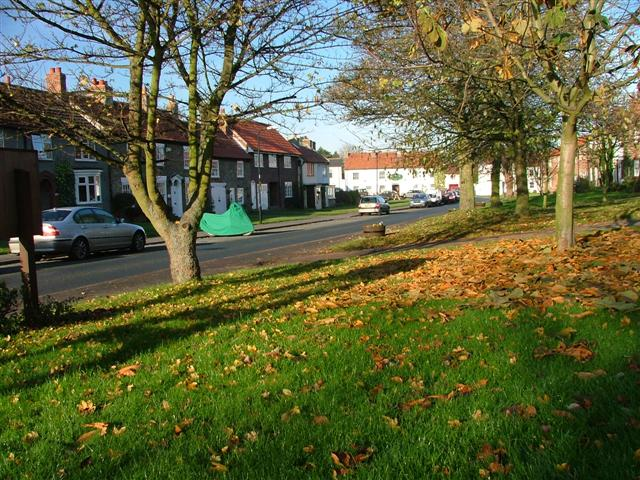
- Appleton Wiske

- Location within North Yorkshire
- Population: 487 (2011 census)
- OS grid reference: NZ390047
- Unitary authority: North Yorkshire
- Ceremonial county: North Yorkshire
- Region: Yorkshire and the Humber
- Country: England
- Sovereign state: United Kingdom
- Post town: NORTHALLERTON
- Postcode district: DL6
- Dialling code: 01609
- Police: North Yorkshire
- Fire: North Yorkshire
- Ambulance: Yorkshire
- UK Parliament: Richmond and Northallerton

Appleton Wiske is a small village and civil parish that sits between Northallerton and Yarm in the Vale of York, a flat tract of land that runs between the North Yorkshire Moors to the east, the Yorkshire Dales to the west and the River Tees to the north.

The village, which was known as Apletona in the Domesday Book, eventually took the name of the nearby River Wiske to distinguish itself from other Appletons in the area, such as Appleton-le-Moors.

== History ==
Appleton Wiske was one of the 41 ancient parishes of the Wapentake of Langbaurgh in the Cleveland division of the North Riding of Yorkshire. It was also a part of the sessional division of Yarm.

From 1974 to 2023 it was part of the Hambleton District, it is now administered by the unitary North Yorkshire Council.

The parish was gifted by William the Conqueror to Robert de Brus of Skelton, an ancestor of Robert the Bruce, the famous Scottish king. De Brus's son gave it to St. Mary's Abbey, York, along with Hornby and other lands. It remained in the possession of the St. Mary's until the dissolution of monasteries, when it was granted by Henry VIII to Charles Brandon, who later became the Duke of Suffolk. The parish then passed through several hands and was finally split up in the early 19th century after the death of Robert Henry Allan, whose family had owned the parish since the early 18th century.

The village is thought to date back to Saxon times and is referred to in the Domesday Book as Apletona. St Mary's Church, Appleton Wiske is not quite as old - the first reference to it is in 1299, when Edward I visited and heard Mass. Parish records indicate that it was being called The Chapel of St Mary Magdalen in Appleton by 1586. It is a small Norman structure, consisting of nave, chancel and porch. The church is now a grade II listed structure, as is the Wesleyan Methodist chapel built in 1821.

In the First World War, 38 acres (15 ha) of land to the north east of the village was used by two squadrons of the Royal Air Force in the Home Defence role. The squadrons were based at RAF Ripon and used Appleton Wiske as a Relief Landing Ground (RLG). Whilst the airfield was scoped out for a possible role in the Second World War, it was never used.

In 2009 it was suggested that a planning application for nine wind turbines was due to be raised with Hambleton District Council. With each turbine planned to be 410 feet (125 m) high and the nearest some 800 yards (730 m) from the village, a group of villagers formed the still existent North Hambleton Windfarm Action Group (NHWAG) to oppose the development.

== Geography ==
The village is 7.5 miles (12.1 km) north east of Northallerton and 4.3 miles (7 km) south west of Yarm. The River Wiske passes to the immediate south of the village on its long journey to the North Sea at Spurn Head.

== Education ==
Appleton Wiske Primary School has a roll of around 80 to 90 pupils with an age range of four to eleven. Children from East Harsley attend Appleton Wiske Primary School alongside children from the village itself. All are in the catchment area for Northallerton School and Sixth Form College.

== Plaudits ==
The village won a gold medal in Yorkshire in Bloom in 2006, 2007 and 2008, also winning best village in 2008. Appleton Wiske has also represented Yorkshire and Humberside three times in the national Britain in Bloom competition. In 2002 winning a silver medal, in 2004 a Silver-Gilt and Best Village and in 2009 a gold medal.

== See also ==
- Listed buildings in Appleton Wiske
