= Brompton, Northallerton =

Town and civil parish in North Yorkshire, England

Coordinates: 54°21′42″N 1°25′25″W

Brompton
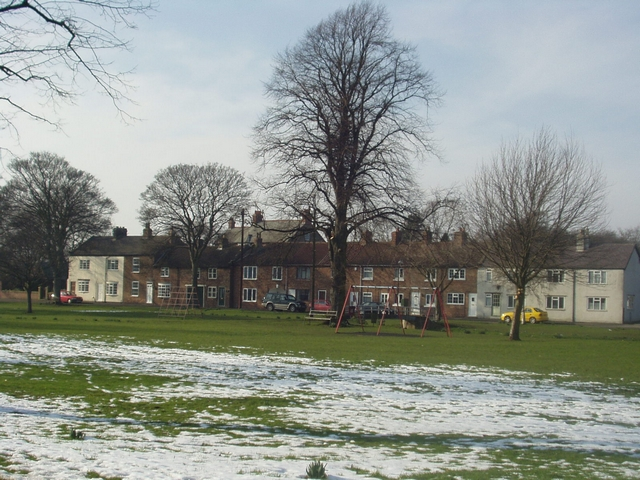
- Water End, Brompton

- Location within North Yorkshire
- Population: 2,055 (2011 census)
- OS grid reference: SE375964
- Unitary authority: North Yorkshire
- Ceremonial county: North Yorkshire
- Region: Yorkshire and the Humber
- Country: England
- Sovereign state: United Kingdom
- Post town: NORTHALLERTON
- Postcode district: DL6
- Dialling code: 01609
- Police: North Yorkshire
- Fire: North Yorkshire
- Ambulance: Yorkshire
- UK Parliament: Richmond and Northallerton

Brompton is a village and civil parish in the unitary area and county of North Yorkshire, England, about 1.6 miles (2.6 km) north of Northallerton. The village was near the site of a battle between English and Scots armies and was the location of mills producing linen goods from the 18th century onward.

== History ==
Brompton is mentioned in the Domesday Book of 1086 as Bruntone in the Allerton hundred. Before the invasion, the manor was granted to Earl Edwin, but was granted to the Crown in 1086 and was added to the lands that were the possession of the Bishop of Durham, St Cuthbert, and remained so after 1086. In 1836 the land was transferred to the see of Ripon. The village became an ecclesiastical parish in 1843.

The etymology of the name Brompton is derived from a combination of the Old English word brōm, meaning broom and the Old English suffix of tūn, meaning farm or settlement. Put together they mean broom farm.

The traditional location for the site of the Battle of the Standard in 1138 is just north-west of Brompton, on land bounded by the A167 road to the west, an overgrown track known as Scotpit Lane to the south and Brompton Lane to the east that is called Standard Hill. This site was where the local militia gathered before the campaign to retake Scotland by Edward I in 1303.

Brompton was an important centre for linen making and weaving in the 19th century with eight mills at its peak in 1820 but the industry had declined by the early 20th century. The John Pattison Yeomans Mill was located in what is now the residential area of Linen Way. Bricks from the demolished chimney of the John Wilford Mill on Station road now form a memorial to linen workers on Water End Green, opposite the Village Inn. Brompton is now largely residential with just a few small businesses, Wilford Mill remains and is occupied by small businesses but its iconic chimney has been demolished.

Brompton has one of the earliest online interactive war memorials where it is possible to find information and photographs of the soldiers to have died in the First World War and the Second World War from the area.

The Willow Beck was the water source for the linen mills and created regular floods, mainly at the Water End area of the village. Since the factory's demolition flooding is no longer commonplace and the last time any properties suffered flood damage was 2000. Extensive flood defence work has been carried out, mainly to protect the school and Station Road area by building flood banks. Engineering work has also been carried out on various parts of the river such as the removal and widening of bends in the banks and creating a bypass when the water reaches its peak.

== Governance ==
Brompton was anciently a chapelry in the parish of Northallerton in the Allertonshire Wapentake of the North Riding of Yorkshire.

Brompton lies within the Richmond and Northallerton UK Parliament constituency. It is in the Northallerton North and Brompton electoral ward of North Yorkshire Council. The parish council is known as Brompton Town Council and has a membership of nine councillors. From 1974 to 2023 it was part of the Hambleton District.

== Geography ==
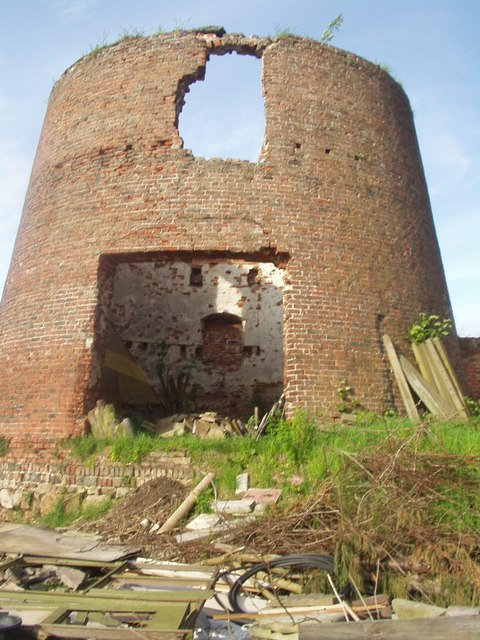
Brompton windmill before restoration work began in 2004

Brompton lies between the A167 Northallerton to Darlington road and the A684 Northallerton to Stokesley road. It had a railway station on the line between Northallerton and Middlesbrough that passes around its northern boundary. The Brompton or Willow Beck that flows through the village is part of the tributary system of the River Wiske.

== Demography ==
Population
Year	1881	1891	1901	1911	1921	1931	1951	1961	2001	2011
Total	1295	1245	1352	1487	1452	1447	1632	1587	1912	2055

The 2001 UK census showed that the population was split 48.4% male to 51.6% female. The religious constituency was made of 79.9% Christian, 0.15% Buddhist, 0.15% Jewish, 0.2% Muslim and the rest stating no religion or not stating at all. The ethnic make-up was 98.8% White British, 1% White Other/Irish, and 0.15% British Asian. There were 905 dwellings.

The 2011 UK census showed that the population was split 49.4% male to 50.6% female. The religious constituency was made of 69.54% Christian, 0.05% Buddhist, 0.24% Muslim, 0.1% Hindu, 0.05% Jewish and the rest stating no religion or not stating at all. The ethnic make-up was 96.35% White British, 1.85% White Other/Irish, 0.58% Mixed Ethnic, 0.05 Black British, 0.19 Arab and other and 0.97% British Asian. There were 1,107 dwellings.

== Religion ==
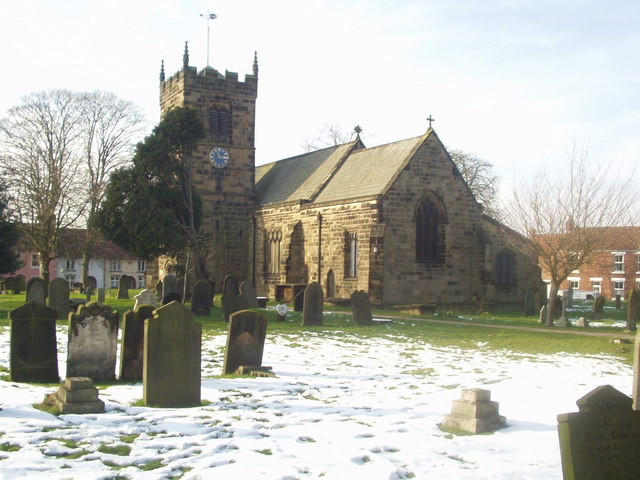
St Thomas's Church, Brompton by Northallerton

St Thomas' Church on High Green adjacent to the village green is a Grade I listed building dating from the 12th century with additions in the 14th and 15th centuries and a restoration undertaken in 1868. The church is reputed to have the largest collection of hogback stone tombs in the United Kingdom. The hogbacks and Viking period crosses suggest that Brompton was the base for a company of stone carvers during that period. It is possible that the hogback was invented in the Allertonshire area since the hogbacks at Brompton and Northallerton are amongst the oldest examples.

A Wesleyan chapel was built in 1794 and enlarged in 1817 with further renovation in 1878. Around 1820 a Primitive Methodist chapel was erected on Cockpit Hill. The chapels joined in 1966.

== Education ==
Brompton Community Primary School has a capacity of around 210 children of mixed gender between the ages of 3 and 11. Pupils at this school are within the catchment area of Northallerton School & Sixth Form College for secondary education.

== Amenities ==
Brompton has an active village hall, the Temperance Hall is used daily and is home to the Brompton Players amateur dramatic group. A small community café is located in Weavers Pavilion on Station Road next to the primary school. The village convenience store is near St Thomas' Church. There are three public houses in the village: the Green Tree, Crown Inn and the Village Inn which reopened in 2011 after extensive refurbishment.

== Sport ==
A football club has played in the village since 1901. The football club plays in the Hambleton League at the recreation ground on Station Road, where a new pavilion was opened in 2011.

== See also ==
- Listed buildings in Brompton, west North Yorkshire
