= Listed buildings in Winmarleigh =

Winmarleigh is a civil parish in the Wyre district of Lancashire, England. It contains two listed buildings that are recorded in the National Heritage List for England. Both the listed buildings are designated at Grade II, the lowest of the three grades, which is applied to "buildings of national importance and special interest". Other than the village of Winmarleigh, the parish is rural. The listed buildings are a public house and a church.

== Buildings ==
Name and location	Photograph	Date	Notes
Patten Arms; 53.93505°N 2.79510°W		Early 19th century	A public house in sandstone with a slate roof, in two storeys and four bays. On the front are chamfered quoins, a plinth, and a cornice. The windows are sashes, and the round-headed doorway has a plain surround and a fanlight.
St Luke's Church; 53.92517°N 2.80700°W		1875–76	The church was designed by Paley and Austin, and the north chapel and vestry were added in 1887. It is in sandstone with a red tile roof, and consists of a nave and a chancel under a continuous roof, a south timber porch, a south organ chamber, a north chapel, and a north vestry. At the junction of the nave and the chancel is a bell turret with a weatherboarded spire. Most of the windows contain Decorated tracery.
