= PGL Travel =

Travel agency in the United Kingdom

PGL
- Traded as: PGL
- Industry: Educational Travel, Holidays
- Founded: 1957
- Founder: Peter Gordon Lawrence
- Headquarters: United Kingdom
- Area served: United Kingdom; France; Australia
- Services: Holiday camps and activities
- Owner: Midlothian Capital Partners
- Website: www.pgl.co.uk

PGL Travel Ltd is a provider of school activity courses and summer camps for children in the United Kingdom. Along with NST, European Study Tours and StudyLink it is a part of the HB Education group, owned by Midlothian Capital Partners.

== History ==
PGL was established in 1957 by Peter Gordon Lawrence as PGL Voyages. In the 1960s and early 1970s, its market was young adults and based on three main activities – canoeing, sailing and pony trekking – with accommodation in tents. PGL moved into the school and group travel market and expanded in the 1980s, purchasing more properties, ranging from a mansion house in Perthshire to a converted farm in Oxfordshire.

PGL opened a headquarters in the South of France and became one of the first UK organisers of canoeing holidays in the Ardèche Gorge.

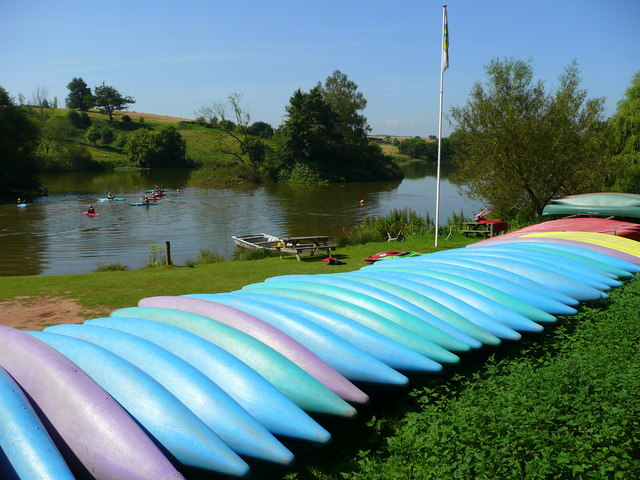
Canoes at Drummond's Dub centre, Herefordshire

In the early 1990s, the acquisition by the company of the former Quest Outdoor Adventure programme, and of a number of centres operated by competitors, resulted in a considerable expansion in the schools' adventure market in the UK and France. In 1993, the company entered the school ski market with the acquisitions of Ski Europe and Ski Wessex.

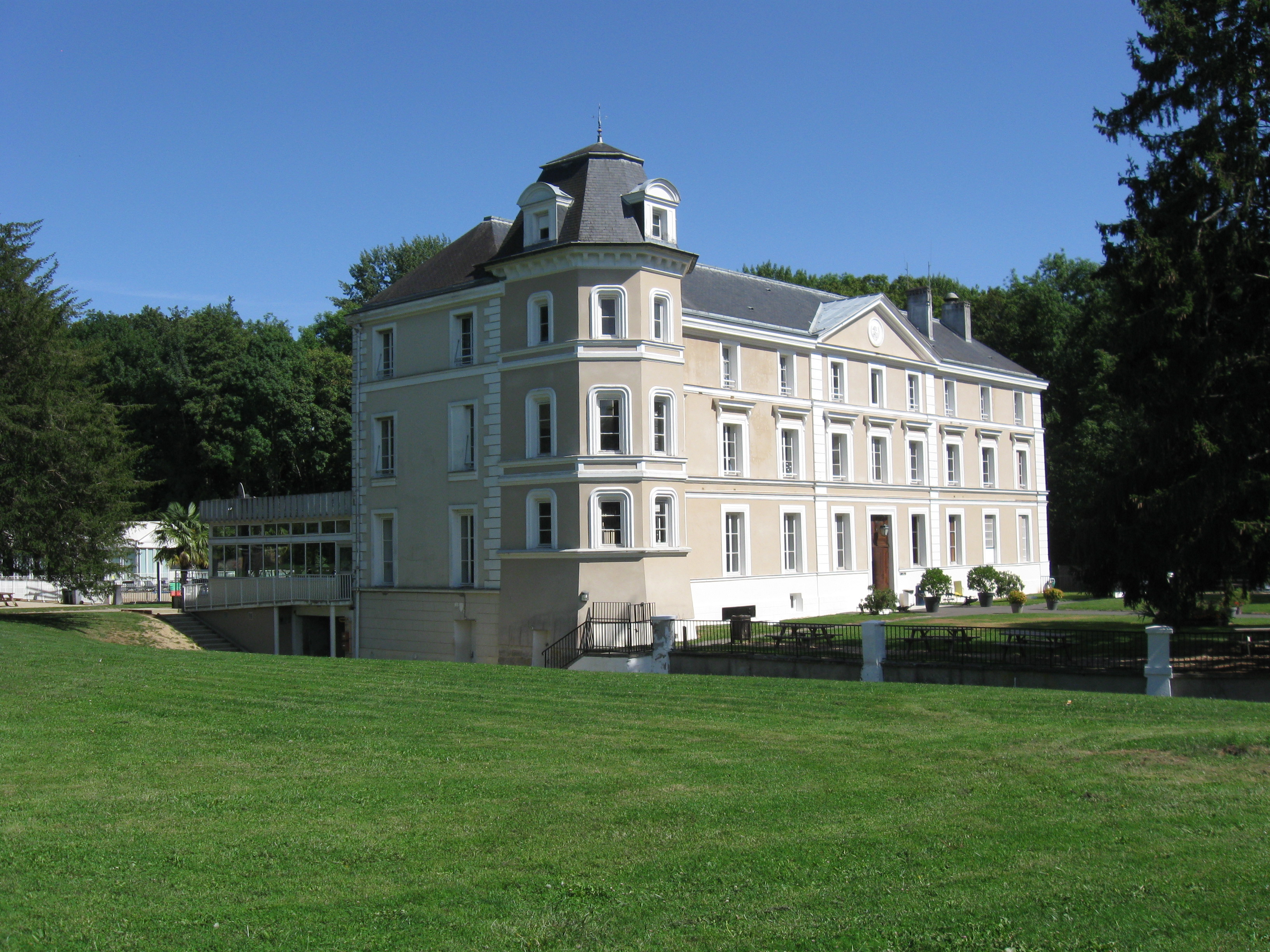
Château de Grande Romaine, France

In 2000, PGL purchased Château de Grande Romaine, a 300-bed former hotel and grounds on the eastern outskirts of Paris.

In July 2004, PGL agreed to buy its biggest rival, 3D Education and Adventure from Center Parcs for £12 million, in order to allow Center Parcs to focus on improving its holiday villages, which added three more centres to PGL's portfolio on the South Coast of England, one on the Isle of Wight, and a contract with Pontins to provide children's activities at their holiday parks under the name 'Go Active', which ended in 2010 when Pontins entered administration.

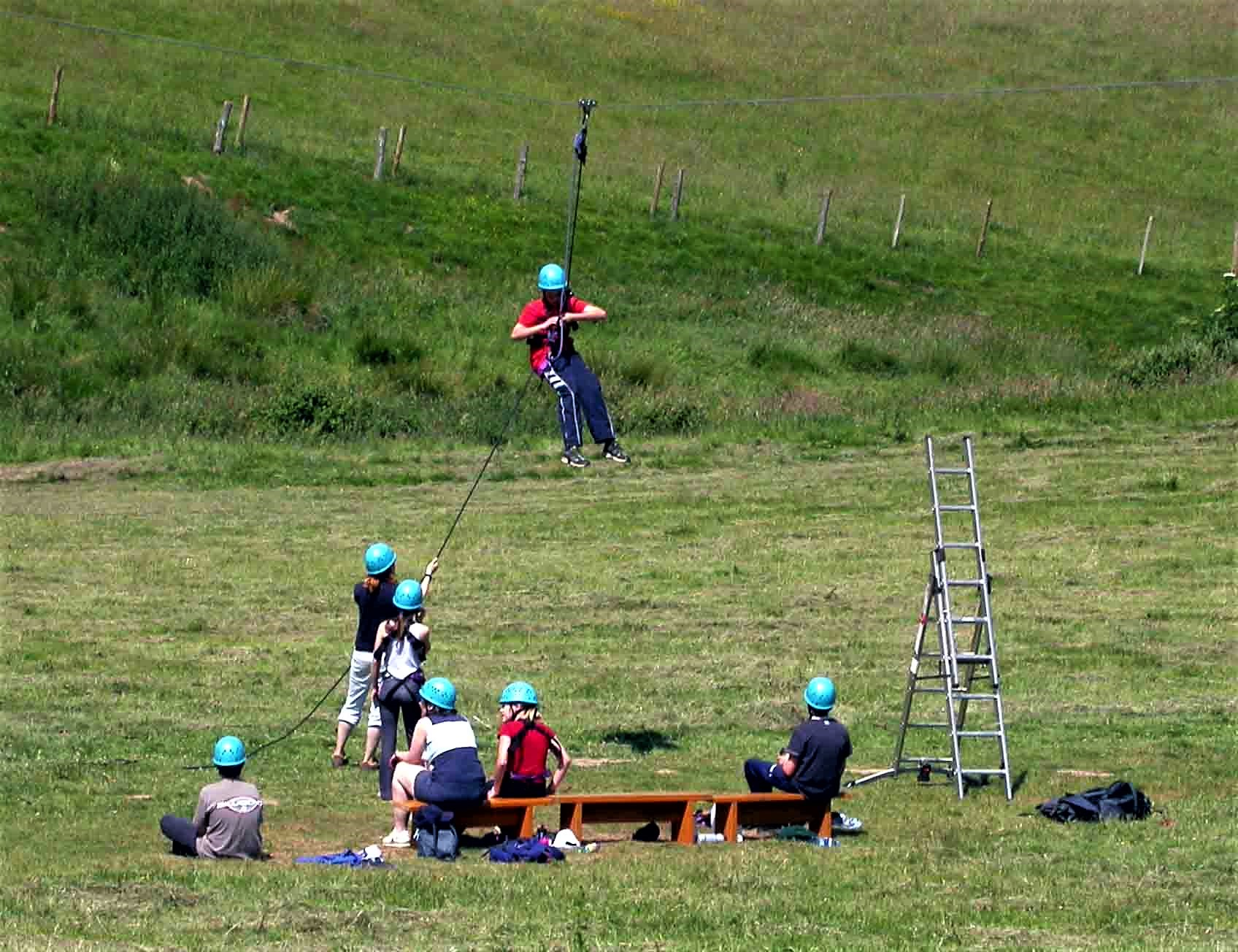
Zipwire, Sedlescombe

In December 2005, PGL suspended three staff members following allegations of inappropriate behaviour involving alcohol, guns and drugs. The allegations were substantiated by photographs showing the staff members engaging in misconduct at their former centre in South Wales. The Children's Commissioner for Wales and the NSPCC condemned the actions, with Natalie Cronin of the NSPCC stating, "they exposed children to unnecessary danger. This behaviour could have resulted in a child suffering serious harm". In response to the incident, PGL bosses admitted they were "shocked and embarrassed" and initiated an internal investigation, implemented stricter policies and enhanced staff training to prevent such incidents in the future.

The company was sold in 2007 to Holidaybreak plc and formed the first part of that company's Education Division. Property acquisitions in the UK included Caythorpe Court, near Grantham, in 2004 and in 2009, King Edward's Place near Swindon in Wiltshire, which trades as PGL Liddington.

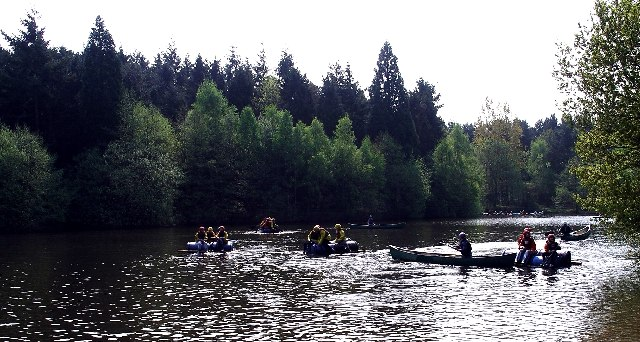
Water events, Boreatton Park, Shropshire

In July 2011, Holidaybreak was purchased by Cox & Kings Limited, based in India. In 2014, PGL opened an office in Melbourne, Australia, and acquired two centres in Victoria and one in Queensland: Campaspe Downs, Camp Rumbug and Kindilan.

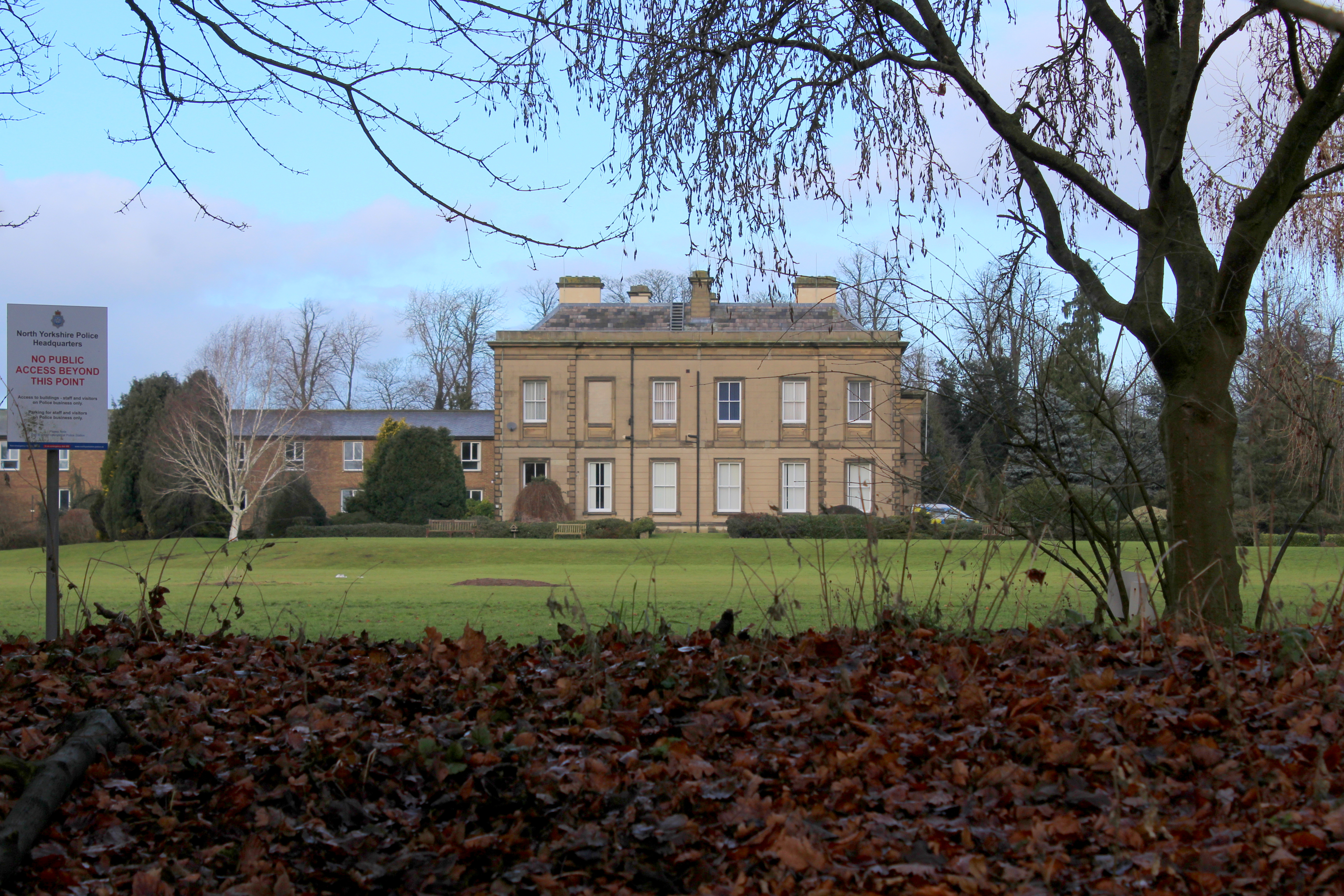
Newby Wiske Hall, North Yorkshire

In 2017, PGL sought to acquire two new centres: Newby Wiske Hall (formerly North Yorkshire Police Headquarters) and Bawdsey Manor on the Suffolk Heritage Coast.

PGL's largest area of business continues to be school trips and educational travel. These range from activity and adventure trips to subject focussed trips such as science, ICT, Maths, Field Studies and French Language courses. During the UK school terms, PGL mainly offers school and youth group holidays, as well as birthday parties and day trips. Outside of term times, PGL also offers family and child-only adventure holidays (summer camps).

In 2020, the coronavirus pandemic had an effect on its business, leading to disputes with customers concerning refunds.

In October 2021, Ofsted suspended the registrations of four PGL-operated activity centres in England due to serious safeguarding concerns. These issues included environmental health and safety violations, as well as allegations of staff misconduct involving substance misuse.

In June 2023, at Guildford Magistrates Court, the company pleaded guilty to violations of Section 33 of the Health and Safety at Work etc. Act 1974. Subsequently, on 2 October 2023, at Staines Magistrates Court, they received a £1 million fine, £18,006 in costs, and a £181 victim surcharge. The court learned that since 2009, PGL had been aware of 520 children across its sites who had suffered finger injuries from doors, some severe enough to cause amputation, yet failed to proactively install finger guards to prevent future incidents.

In January 2025, PGL acquired three new centres: Grosvenor Hall in Ashford; Dearne Valley in Doncaster; and Overstrand Hall in Cromer, from Inspiring Learning Group, who operated Kingswood activity centres, one of PGL's biggest rivals, in a rescue deal, to ensure that the planned residential trips for over 50,000 young people that year could go ahead. The acquired centres would trade under the PGL name until the end of the season, when they would undergo a full transition. PGL also announced they would accept new bookings from impacted Kingswood customers at the price previously agreed with Kingswood, and further reduce that price to recognise any monies previously paid.

== Abroad ==
PGL has centres in France for school groups and other youth groups - which offer both activity and educational holidays - and three centres in Australia for school groups, youth and other groups, and school holiday camps.

=== France ===
- Château de Grande Romaine, Île-de-France
- Domaine de Segries, Ardèche

=== Australia ===
- PGL Camp Rumbug (South Gippsland, Victoria)
- PGL Campaspe Downs (Kyneton, Victoria)
- PGL Kindilan (Redland Bay, Queensland)

== Sources ==
- The Independent, 24 July 2008
- Article from The FT on acquisition by Cox & Kings, 18 August 2011
- Article from Travel Weekly, 27 July 2011
- Article on expansion to the Australian market, 17 January 2014
- BBC article on purchase of PGL Liddington, 13 May 2010
