= King Edward's Place =

Country house in Wiltshire, England

Coordinates: 51°31′53″N 01°40′35″W

King Edward's Place is a country house at Foxhill near Wanborough and Liddington in Wiltshire. It is currently known as PGL Liddington and is owned and operated by children's adventure holiday operator PGL. Previous names for the estate include Foxhill Stud Farm and Foxhill Manor.

The house is believed to have been bought for King Edward VII to entertain his long-time mistress Lillie Langtry, and has been at various times a racehorse stud yard, a conference centre, and latterly an outdoor education centre.

== Construction and early use ==
The original house was built, most likely in 1883, by three Oxford undergraduates, who were all members of the Marlborough Club and used the country house to host parties and shoots on weekends. It was originally known as Foxhill Stud Farm or Foxhill Manor.

Records indicate its use as a stud farm by 1895, with the stud farm trainer William Robinson listed as the resident.

== Use by King Edward ==
As Prince of Wales, and subsequently as King, Edward VII was a regular visitor to the house, and often accompanied by long-term mistress Lillie Langtry who stabled her horses at Foxhill.

== Jimmy White era ==
The estate continued in use as a stud farm for racehorses. After the first world war, it was bought by financier James "Jimmy" White, who made significant improvements to the house, including the addition of a stone entrance hall and sweeping staircase, as well as a heated greenhouse. He continued to invest in the equine operations at the house, and under his ownership, the stud became the village's largest employer.

White had wide-ranging business interests, often in property speculation, and had recently purchased Wembley Stadium and the White City dog track. Whilst he was in the process of selling those assets, he found himself in considerable debt, including owing £1.7 million in tax. The growing financial pressure led to him committing suicide in his bedroom at King Edward's Place on 28 June 1927. A coroner's inquest found that the death was suicide by reason of insanity. Such was his popularity, that over 5,000 people attended his funeral. He left three notes, for the butler, his family, and the coroner. The note for the coroner read "Go easy with me, old man. I am dead from prussic acid. No need to cut any deeper. – Jimmy."

== Later private ownership ==
After White's death, the house changed ownership a number of times, before being purchased in 1932 by Washington Singer, one of the heirs to the Singer sewing machine fortune and keen racehorse enthusiast, for his step-daughter and her husband Major Edgar Prescott Barker.

On the death of Singer, his collection of 70 racehorses was brought to be stabled at King Edward's place.

The house and stud stayed in the Barker family, passing to son Captain Fred Barker, who managed the stud until 1987.

== Training centre ==
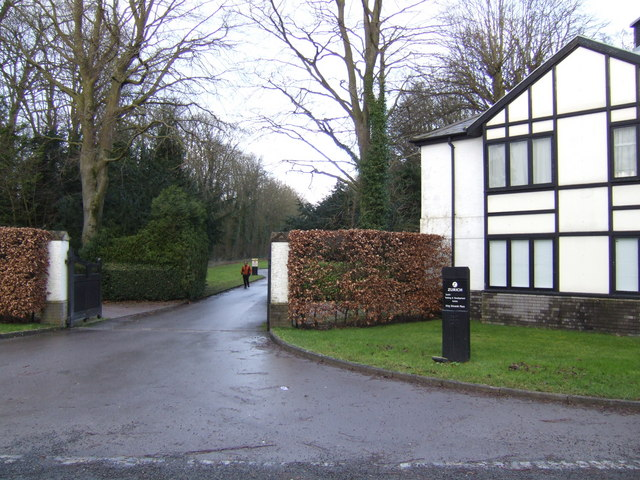
Entrance during time as Zurich training centre

With the stud needing significant investment beyond the means of the family, it was sold to life assurance company Allied Dunbar, headquartered in nearby Swindon, to be their training centre. Allied Dunbar kept the original house and stables, and added a large, modern training centre, which opened in 1991.

Zurich Financial Services bought Allied Dunbar in 1998, and industry changes meant that the direct sales force predominantly trained at the centre became the Zurich Advice Network in 2001, and then was demerged as the independent Openwork in 2005.

Allied Dunbar and Openwork shared the facilities at King Edward's Place, but the lack of a direct sales force meant that in 2006 Zurich announced plans to sell the entire centre for redevelopment as a hotel.

The conference centre also sold spare capacity to other organisations to use, and this was used by a range of clients including for public inquiries.

During the Allied Dunbar and Zurich era, the grounds were also used by Swindon Town F.C. as a training facility and centre of excellence.

== Hotel ==
In 2008, the sale was completed to the Petersham Hotel, who paid around £12 million for the site, and converted the premises into a hotel called 'The Liddington'. The hotel was managed for the Petersham group by the De Vere group under their De Vere Venues brand, but the site went into administration in 2009.

== Activity centre ==
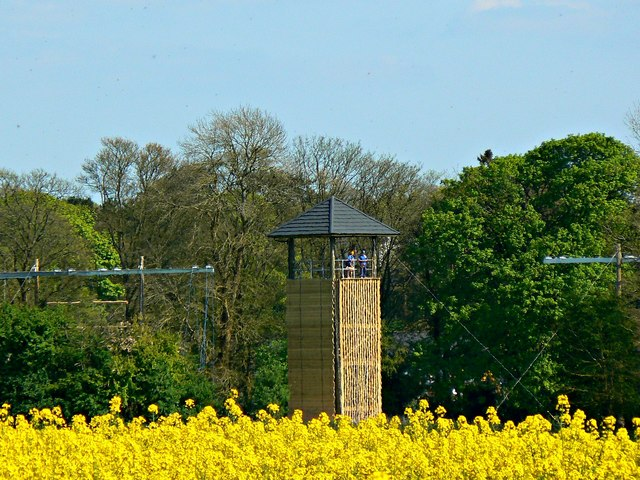
Climbing tower at PGL Liddington

Children's activity holiday operator PGL bought the site from the administrators for around £10 million in August 2009. The new PGL centre, known as PGL Liddington, opened in April 2010, creating more than 100 jobs.

PGL offers adventure holidays for unaccompanied children, family adventure holidays, and school or group residential trips at the centre.

The centre retains the 150-acre site of the training centre, and there is a range of activity stations in the grounds, such as towers for climbing and abseiling, high and low ropes course for activities such as giant swing and Jacob's ladder, zip wires from launch platforms, and archery butts. The ponds are used for activities such as canoeing and raft building.

== Listing and protection ==
The greenhouse on site, built by Jimmy White in 1914, is a Grade II listed building, and features on the Historic England register.
