= Alec Wainman =

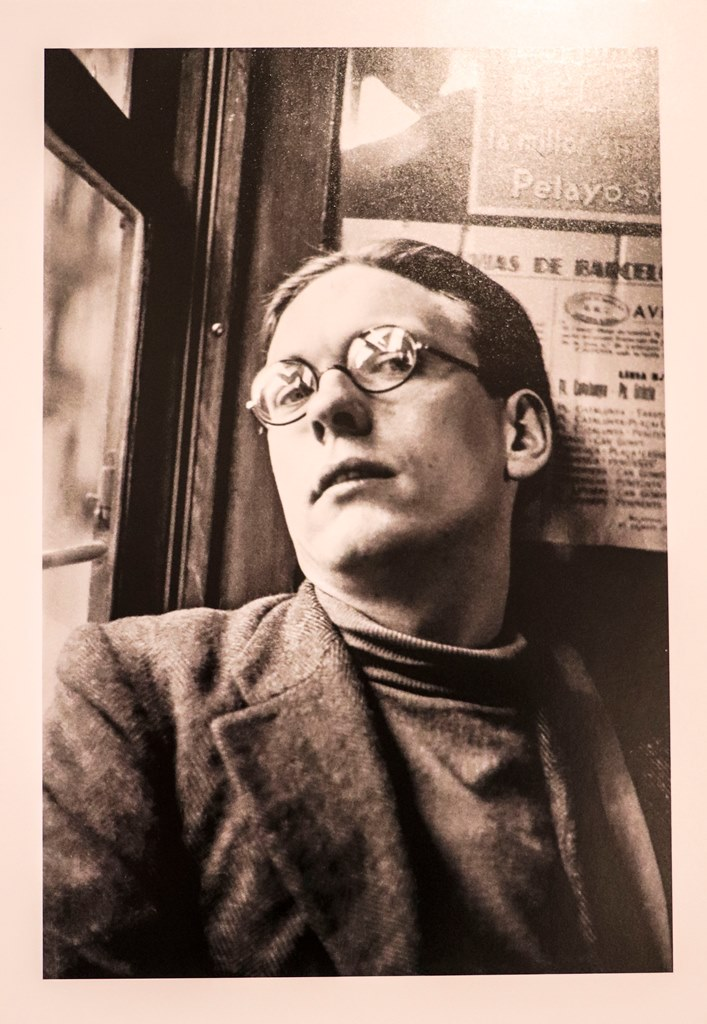
- Alec Wainman
- Born: Alexander Wheeler Wainman; 11 March 1913; Otterington Hall, North Yorkshire, UK
- Died: 1989 (aged 75–76)
- Education: Modern Languages
- Occupations: Photographer, Linguist, university lecturer
- Known for: Spanish Civil War photography
- Mother: Christine nee Wheeler

Alexander Wheeler Wainman (1913-1989) was a British photographer, Quaker, and Slavonic Scholar at the University of British Columbia. He is most known for his work as a frontline medical volunteer for the Republican government and anti-fascist forces during the Spanish Civil War, and for the large collection of photographs he took during the war, which was published posthumously.

== Early life and work ==
Alec Wainman was born on 11 March 1913 at Otterington Hall, North Yorkshire, England. His father was a captain in the 2nd Battalion of the Worcestershire Regiment and was killed in Loos during World War I. Wainman was raised by his mother in Vernon, British Columbia, Canada, with his three brothers. In 1928, Wainman returned to Britain and studied both Russian and Italian at the University of Oxford. By 1933, his mother had returned to England, where she lived in Shipton-under-Wychwood, Oxfordshire, an address which Wainman listed as his home during the 1930s. During the years 1934–1935, Wainman spent time living in the Soviet Union while working for the British Embassy in Moscow. Although Wainman was not a member of any political parties, he was deeply sympathetic to communist causes, and was a member of the International Association of Friends of the Soviet Union.

== Experiences during the Spanish Civil War ==
Wainman volunteered for the Spanish Medical Aid Committee (SMAC) soon after it was founded, and was one of six ambulance drivers which left London for Spain on 23 August 1936 as part of the British Medical Aid Unit. Accompanied by life-long Communist Party of Great Britain (CPGB) activist Thora Silverthorne, Wainman helped to establish the first British hospital in Spain during the Spanish Civil War. During his time in Spain, Wainman started using his talents as a photographer for media work and began offering his services as a photographer for the Spanish Republican government, and later the Unified Socialist Party of Catalonia.

During his time in Spain, Wainman indulged his passion for photography by capturing behind-the-scenes photos of Republican everyday life. Suffering from hepatitis, he returned to Britain in 1938.

== Later life ==
After returning to Britain, Wainman used his connections to free Spanish republicans held within a French concentration camp in Le Barcarès and bring them to Britain. He then found employment and accommodation for these former prisoners and lived together with his mother and the many Spanish refugee children which the Wainman family cared for.

Having travelled in Europe extensively, Wainman spoke at least seven European languages including English, Spanish, Catalan, Portuguese, German, Russian, and Italian. During World War II, Wainman was a member of the Special Operations Executive.

Wainman returned to civilian life as a lecturer, then as a professor, on Slavic studies at the University of British Columbia in Vancouver. He died in 1989.

== Wainman’s collection of photos ==
In 1975, a London-based publishing house got Wainman's photos with a view to publishing them but the publisher went into liquidation and Wainman's collection was believed to be lost. In 2013 his son John Alexander Wainman, known by the pseudonym 'Serge Alternês', salvaged his father's photo collection and published a selection, along with his memoir, in the book Live Souls.

== Exhibitions ==
- Museum of the History of Catalonia 2019-2020: Beyond the trenches (1936-1939). Shows more than 150 photographs of Wainman from the Spanish Civil War.

== Film ==
Film Without you I would not exist.

Wainman's collection was also used in the BBC documentary The Secret of a Murdered Priest.
