= Winmarleigh Hall =

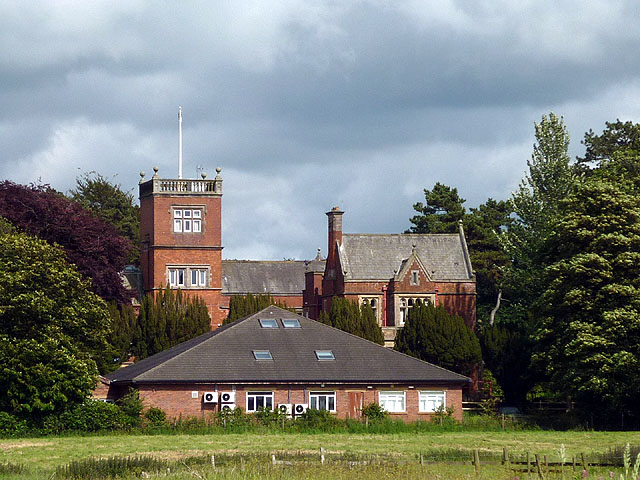

- Location in the Borough of Wyre
- 53.9208°N 2.8086°W
- Location: Winmarleigh, Lancashire, England

History
- Built: 1871
- Built for: John Wilson-Patten

Site notes
- Architect(s): Paley and Austin; Henry Kirkley
- Architectural style: Jacobean Revival
- Governing body: PGL

Winmarleigh Hall is a former country house located to the south of the village of Winmarleigh, Lancashire, England, now operated by PGL as an adventure centre.

== History ==
The manor of Winmarleigh was bought in 1744 by Thomas Patten (died 1772) of Bank Hall, Warrington and passed down in turn through his son Thomas Patten (died 1806) and his third son Thomas Wilson-Patten (died 1826) to his second son John Wilson-Patten (1802-1892).

Winmarleigh Hall was built in 1871 for the latter, later the 1st Baron Winmarleigh, who had been MP for North Lancashire for 42 years and who moved here from Bank Hall, Warrington. It was designed by the Lancaster architects Paley and Austin. The house was enlarged and altered in 1915–14 by Henry Kirkley of Manchester, and altered again following a fire in 1927. Since 1998 it has been used as a children's adventure centre, and is administered by PGL.

== Architecture ==
The hall is constructed in red brick with stone dressings, and is in Jacobean style. It has an L-shaped plan with a tall staircase tower. The tower originally had a pyramidal roof, but now is surmounted by a balustrade. The interior of the house is decorated with delicate plasterwork, and the windows around the staircase contain stained glass. The former morning room includes a ceiling with pendants.

== See also ==
- List of non-ecclesiastical works by Paley and Austin
