= Newby Wiske =

Village and civil parish in North Yorkshire, England

Coordinates: 54°17′01″N 1°26′13″W

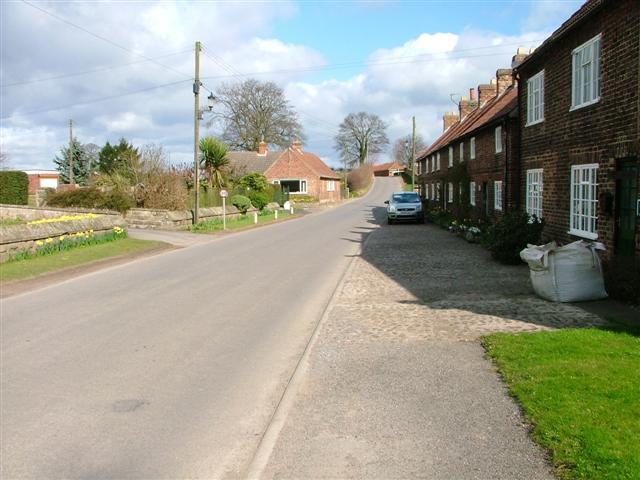
- Newby Wiske

- Location within North Yorkshire
- Population: 181 (2011 census)
- OS grid reference: SE366878
- Civil parish: Newby Wiske
- Unitary authority: North Yorkshire
- Ceremonial county: North Yorkshire
- Region: Yorkshire and the Humber
- Country: England
- Sovereign state: United Kingdom
- Post town: Northallerton
- Postcode district: DL7
- Police: North Yorkshire
- Fire: North Yorkshire
- Ambulance: Yorkshire
- UK Parliament: Thirsk and Malton

Newby Wiske is a village and civil parish in the county of North Yorkshire, England. It is situated on the River Wiske, about five miles north-west of Thirsk.

== History ==
The village has always belonged to the manor of Kirby Wiske. The manor was split between the de Maunby and de Holtby families in the 13th and 14th century. Later records show the manor passing to the Saltmarsh family. In the 16th century the manor was passed to the Willey family, whose descendant married into the Reveley family of Northumberland.

== Governance ==
The village is within the Thirsk and Malton UK Parliament constituency. From 1974 to 2023 it was part of the Hambleton District, it is now administered by the unitary North Yorkshire Council.

== Geography ==
The nearest settlements to the village are South Otterington 0.5 miles (0.8 km) to the east and Maunby 1.2 miles (1.9 km) to the south-west. It stands on the east bank of the River Wiske.

The 1881 UK Census recorded the population as 216. The 2001 UK Census recorded the population as 174 of which 142 were over the age of sixteen years and of these 81 were in employment. There were 81 dwellings of which 40 were detached.

== Religion ==
There used to be Methodist Chapel in the village erected in 1814.

== Notable buildings ==
Newby Wiske Hall is a Grade II listed country house on the western edge of the village. The oldest parts of the building appear to date from 1693, but most of the current structure was built in the 19th century. It was used as a training centre by North Riding Constabulary from 1954, and in 1976 it became the headquarters of the succeeding police force, North Yorkshire Police. The force moved its headquarters to Alverton Court (the former offices of the Rural Payments Agency) in nearby Northallerton in 2017. North Yorkshire Police sold the Newby Wiske Hall site, which consists of the original country house and a number of later buildings, in March 2017. The new owners are activity holiday company PGL.

Solberge Hall Hotel is a Georgian house of historical significance that was built in 1824.

== Notable residents ==
Sir Hugh Smithson was born at Newby Wiske Hall in 1714.
