= Listed buildings in Appleton Wiske =

Appleton Wiske is a civil parish in the county of North Yorkshire, England. It contains five listed buildings that are recorded in the National Heritage List for England. All the listed buildings are designated at Grade II, the lowest of the three grades, which is applied to "buildings of national importance and special interest". The parish contains the village of Appleton Wiske and the surrounding area. All the listed buildings are in the village, and consist of a church, a chapel, two houses and a public house.

== Buildings ==
| Name and location | Photograph | Date | Notes |
|---|---|---|---|
| St Mary's Church; 54.43594°N 1.40040°W | | 12th century | The church has been altered and extended through the centuries, and most of the present structure is from a restoration in 1875. The church is built in stone, with roofs of Welsh slate and stone slate. It consists of a two-bay nave with a south porch, and a chancel with a north vestry, and on the west gable is a bellicose. Inside the church, the chancel arch is Norman with two orders of decorated columns. |
| The Lord Nelson Inn; 54.43737°N 1.39980°W | | 18th century | The public house is in rendered brick and has a pantile roof. There are two storeys and four bays. In the centre is a doorway with double doors and a fanlight, and the windows are sashes. |
| Garth House; 54.43665°N 1.39978°W | — | Late 18th century | The house is in red brick, and has a pantile roof with stone coping and shaped kneelers. There are two storeys, a main block of three bays, and a lower two-bay wing to the right. The doorway has reeded pilasters, a fanlight, friezes with paterae, and an open pediment. There is one horizontally-sliding sash window, and the other windows in both parts are sashes with flat brick arches. The wing has dentilled eaves and contains garage doors. |
| Wesley Methodist Chapel; 54.43494°N 1.39945°W | | 1821 | The chapel is in red brick on a stone plinth, with cogged eaves and a Welsh slate roof. There are two storeys and three bays, each bay with a full-height recessed arch. Steps lead up to the central round-arched doorway that has a fanlight, and the windows are round-arched sashes. On the right bay is an inscribed and dated stone tablet. |
| Staindale House; 54.43678°N 1.39929°W | — | Early 19th century | The house is in red brick with a cogged eaves band and a pantile roof. There are two storeys and three bays. The central doorway has a flat brick arch. Most of the windows are sashes, those in the ground floor with flat brick arches, and to the left is a small four-pane window. |
