= St Mary's Church, Appleton Wiske =

Church in Appleton Wiske, North Yorkshire, England

Coordinates: 54°26′09″N 1°24′01″W

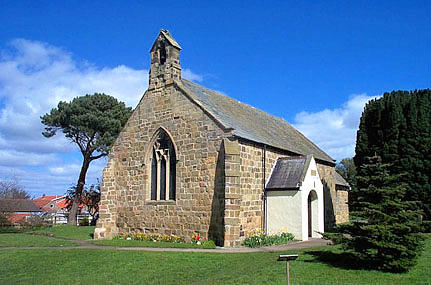
The church, in 2001

St Mary's Church is the parish church of Appleton Wiske, a village in North Yorkshire, in England.

The oldest surviving part of the church is the chancel arch, which was constructed in the 12th century, its size suggesting that it was part of an important building. Parts of the walls may also date from the 12th century, but they have been heavily altered. There are buttresses which probably date from the 14th century, while the chancel is probably 16th century. The north door was walled up in 1760, and in 1802 the roof was replaced, and a gallery and new pews were installed. In 1875, the building was heavily restored by Walker Stead, with the work of 1802 removed, new windows added, and the ground level outside lowered. A vestry was added in the 20th century, and the building was Grade II listed in 1970.

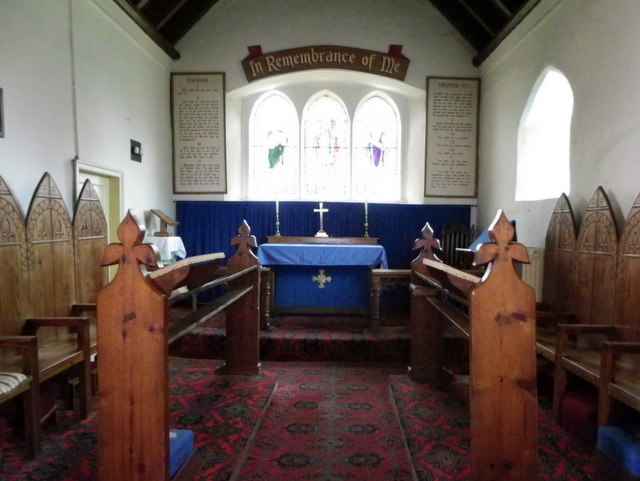
View from the nave into the chancel, in 2011

The building is constructed of stone from Osmotherley, and has a mixture of stone slates and Welsh slate on its roof. It consists of a two-bay nave with south porch, and a lower chancel with north vestry. Most of the windows are 19th century, but the chancel retains one twin lancet window from the 16th century.

== See also ==
- Listed buildings in Appleton Wiske
