= Listed buildings in Brompton, west North Yorkshire =

Brompton is a civil parish in the county of North Yorkshire, England. It contains 15 listed buildings that are recorded in the National Heritage List for England. Of these, one is listed at Grade I, the highest of the three grades, and the others are at Grade II, the lowest grade. The parish contains the village of Brompton and the surrounding countryside. Most of the listed buildings are houses, cottages, a farmhouse, and associated structures, and the others are a church, a public house, a former chapel, and a boundary stone.

== Key ==
| Grade | Criteria |
|---|---|
| I | Buildings of exceptional interest, sometimes considered to be internationally important |
| II | Buildings of national importance and special interest |

== Buildings ==
| Name and location | Photograph | Date | Notes | Grade |
|---|---|---|---|---|
| St Thomas' Church; 54.36140°N 1.42627°W | | 12th century | The church has been altered and extended through the centuries, including a restoration in 1868 by Ewan Christian. It is built in stone with Welsh slate roofs, and consists of a nave, a north aisle, a chancel, a north vestry, and a partly embraced southwest tower incorporating a porch. The tower has three stages, diagonal buttresses, a south doorway with a chamfered surround and a basket arch, a hood mould and a small niche. Above are chamfered bands, clock faces, two-light bell openings, an embattled parapet with corner crocketed pinnacles, and a pyramidal roof. Inside the church are pre-Norman items, including three early 10th century hogback tombstones with flanking sitting bears, and two crosses. | I |
| The Three Horseshoes Inn; 54.36182°N 1.42345°W | | Late 17th century | The public house is in colourwashed plaster on stone, on a chamfered plinth, with rusticated quoins, pilasters on deep plinths between the bays, and a pantile roof with moulded stone coping and a shaped kneeler on the right. There are two storeys and three bays, the right bay gabled. The doorway has pilasters, a frieze and a cornice, and to its right and in the upper floor are sash windows. In the outer bays are canted bay windows, each with a frieze, a cornice and a lead hipped roof. The gable of the right bay contains a moulded plaster triangle containing three horseshoes. | II |
| 1, 3 and 5 Northallerton Road; 54.36096°N 1.42524°W | — | Early 18th century | A row of three roughcast houses with dentilled eaves bands, and a pantile roof with three courses of stone slate at eaves level, and stone coping and a shaped kneeler on the left. There are two storeys and three bays. On the front are three doorways with keystones, the left one with a quoined surround. In the ground floor are three bow windows and the upper floor contains casement windows. | II |
| 24 The Green; 54.36086°N 1.42471°W | — | Early 18th century | The house is rendered and has stone dressings, rusticated quoins, and a tile roof with stone coping and a shaped kneeler on the left. There are two storeys and three bays. The central doorway has a chamfered quoined surround, a fanlight and a keystone, and the windows are sashes, those in the ground floor with keystones. | II |
| 42 and 44 Cockpit Hill; 54.36210°N 1.42184°W | — | Mid 18th century | A house later divided into two, in stone on a chamfered plinth, with quoins, an eaves band, and a pantile roof with stone coping on the left. On the front are inserted doorways and casement windows. | II |
| Low Grange; 54.37166°N 1.42906°W | — | Mid 18th century | A farmhouse divided into two houses, in red brick, with dressings in brick and stone, and two storeys. The main house has three bays, an eaves band, a cornice, a balustraded parapet with moulded coping, and a Welsh slate roof with stone coping. It contains a doorway with a rusticated quoined surround, a fanlight and a keystone The windows are sashes with keystones. To the right is a lower wing with four bays, dentilled eaves, and a pantile roof with stone coping and a shaped kneeler to the right. It contains two doorways with flat brick arches and keystones, and casement windows. | II |
| 6 The Green; 54.36102°N 1.42408°W | — | Mid to late 18th century | A house in red brick, with dressings in brick and stone, an eaves band, and a pantile roof with stone copings and shaped kneelers on the right. There are two storeys and five bays. In the fourth bay is a basket-arched carriage entrance with a quoined surround. The second bay contains a doorway with a panelled intrados, reeded Doric pilasters, a fanlight with radial glazing bars, a frieze with triglyphs and guttae, and a cornice. The windows in the ground floor are sashes with stuccoed wedge lintels, and in the upper floor are casement windows. | II |
| 7 and 8 The Green; 54.36087°N 1.42415°W | — | Mid to late 18th century | A pair of houses in red brick, with stone dressings, quoins, a moulded cornice, a blocking course, and a Welsh slate roof with stone coping. There are two storeys, and each house has two bays. Each doorway has a fanlight and a cornice, and the windows are sashes with stuccoed wedge lintels. | II |
| Boundary stone 54.35195°N 1.39869°W | | 1759 | The boundary stone consists of a roughly rectangular block of limestone on the east side of Banks Road. It is inscribed “Brumpton Liberty North 1759”, and on the top is an Ordnance Survey benchmark. | II |
| 19 and 20 Church View; 54.36176°N 1.42543°W | | Late 18th to early 19th century | A pair of red brick houses with a moulded cornice, a blocking course, and a Welsh slate roof with stone copings. There are two storeys and six bays. In the right bay is a basket-arched carriage entrance with brick voussoirs, and to the left are three caned bay windows. The two doorways have reeded Doric pilasters, impost mouldings to the archivolt, a traceried fanlight, consoles with guttae, and an open pediment. The upper floor contains sash windows with stuccoed wedge lintels. | II |
| Chapel House; 54.36111°N 1.42398°W | | c. 1820 | A chapel converted into a house, in red brick on a stone plinth, with dressings in stone and brick, a sill band, dentilled eaves, and a Welsh slate roof with stone coping and shaped kneelers. There are two storeys and three bays, and in the middle bay is a full height recessed blind semicircular arch. In the centre is a round-arched doorway with Doric pilasters, a large stilted semicircular fanlight, and a moulded archivolt with a keystone. The windows are sashes with round-arched heads. | II |
| 10 Lead Lane; 54.36136°N 1.42330°W | — | Early 19th century | A house in red brick, with dentilled eaves, and a tile roof with stone coping and shaped kneelers. There are two storeys and three bays. In the right bay is a basket-arched carriage entrance with brick voussoirs, and the doorway has pilasters and a flat arch. The windows are sashes, those in the ground floor with flat brick arches. | II |
| Rose Cottage farmhouse and wall 54.36635°N 1.42861°W | — | Early 19th century | The farmhouse is in red brick, with a moulded eaves band, and a pantile roof with stone coping. There are two storeys and four bays, and a single-storey extension to the right. The doorway has a plain stone surround and a cornice, and the windows are sashes with stuccoed wedge lintels. To the left of the house is a screen wall with double recessed blind semicircular arches, and at a right angle to each end is a stone-coped ramped brick wall. | II |
| Little Close; 54.35738°N 1.42865°W | — | c. 1895 | A terrace of houses, originally servants' cottages and a laundry for The Close, in red brick with a tile roof, and in Tudor style. There is a single storey and twelve bays, two of the bays projecting and gabled. In the angles of the gabled bays are half-bays with Dutch gables containing doorways with cornices on consoles, and stair cross windows. The gabled bays have shaped quoins, canted bay windows, and in the gable is brick patterning and diapering. Elsewhere, there are casement windows, and round-arched doorways with brick voussoirs, and banded rustication. | II |
| The Close; 54.35757°N 1.42964°W | — | 1895 | A house, designed by Walter Brierley in Jacobean style, in red brick with stone dressings, a tile roof, and an L-shaped plan. The main front has two storeys and attics, four bays, and a plinth with brick coping. In the centre is a doorway with a quoined surround and a four-centred arched head, flanked by full height caned bay windows with parapets. All the windows are mullioned or mullioned and transomed, and there are two flat-headed dormers. To the right is a service wing, and to the left is the main entrance porch with an embattled parapet, containing a round-arched doorway with a chamfered surround, above which are two crests and a cornice. Inside the house is a large inglenook fireplace. | II |
