= St Thomas' Church, Brompton =

Anglican church in North Yorkshire, England

Coordinates: 54.3614°N 1.4264°W

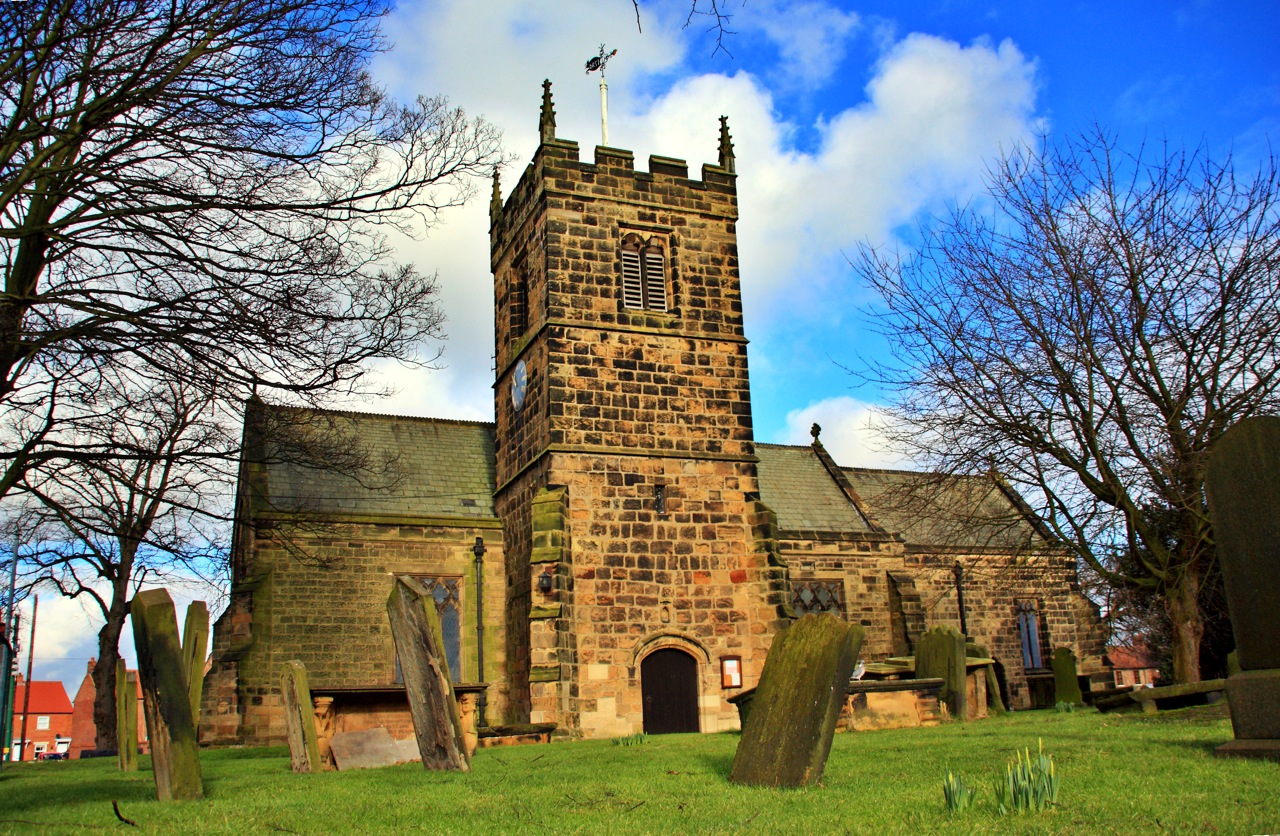
The church, in 2010

St Thomas' Church is the parish church of Brompton, a village near Northallerton in North Yorkshire, in England.

There was a church on the site by the 11th century, but the oldest surviving parts of the current church are parts of the north aisle and south wall of the nave, dating from about 1180. The chancel was rebuilt in the 14th century, when the nave was lengthened, and the north aisle was raised in height. The tower was added in the 15th century. The nave was repaired in 1638, and the chancel in 1660, both occasions marked by plaques on the relevant south walls. The church was restored by Ewan Christian in 1868, which included the replacement of most of the windows, removal of the gallery, and the addition of a chancel arch, organ chamber and vestry. The building was Grade I listed in 1970.

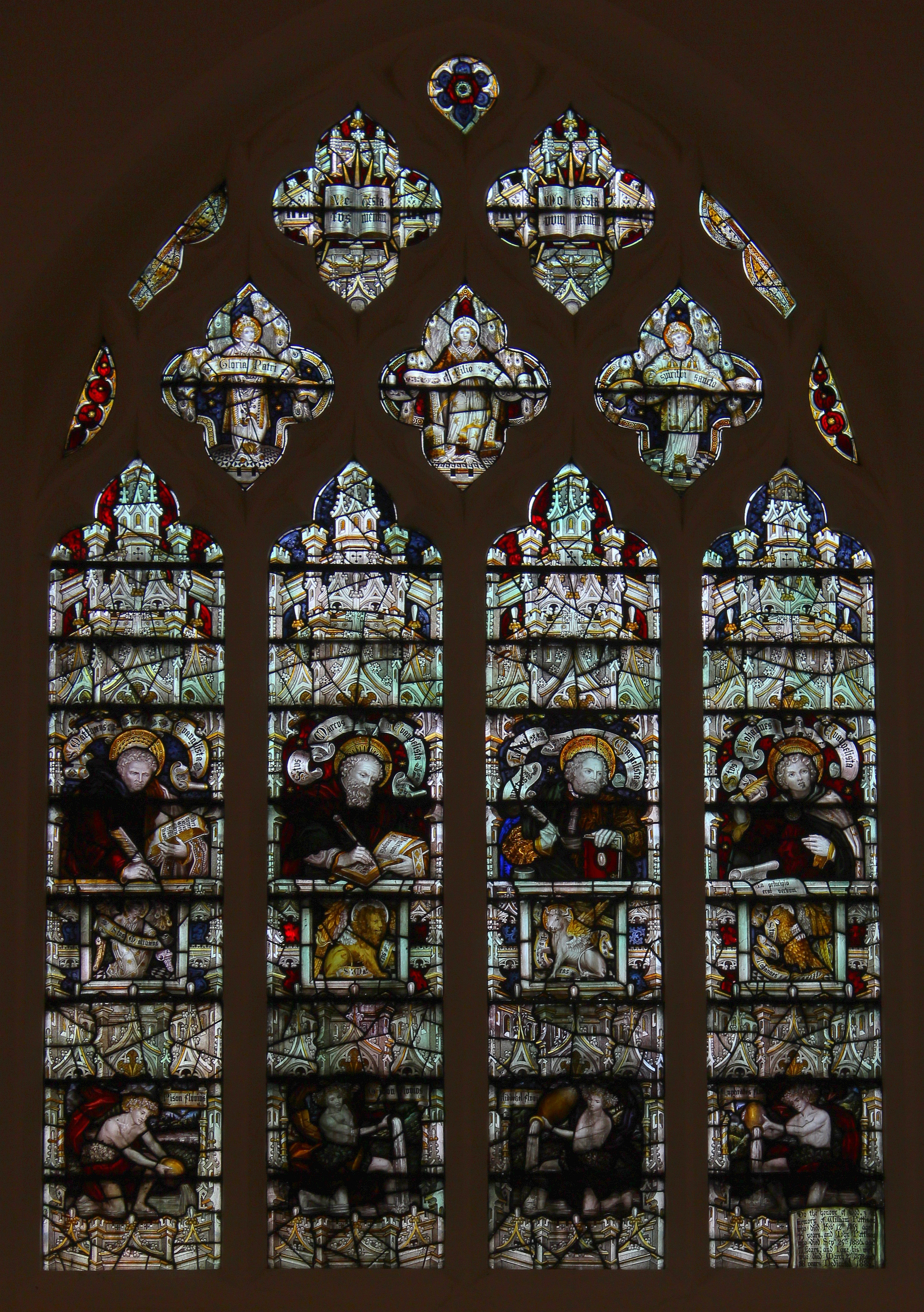
The west window

The church is built of stone with Welsh slate roofs, and consists of a nave, a north aisle, a chancel, a north vestry, and a partly embraced southwest tower incorporating a porch. The tower has three stages, diagonal buttresses, a south doorway with a chamfered surround and a basket arch, a hood mould and a small niche. Above are chamfered bands, clock faces, two-light bell openings, an embattled parapet with corner crocketed pinnacles, and a pyramidal roof. Inside the church are pre-Norman items, including three early 10th century hogback tombstones with flanking sitting bears, and two crosses. There is a 17th-century chest in the vestry, and the west window has stained glass by Charles Eamer Kempe.

== See also ==
- Grade I listed buildings in North Yorkshire (district)
- Listed buildings in Brompton, west North Yorkshire
