= Winmarleigh =

Village in Lancashire, England

Coordinates: 53.923°N 2.808°W

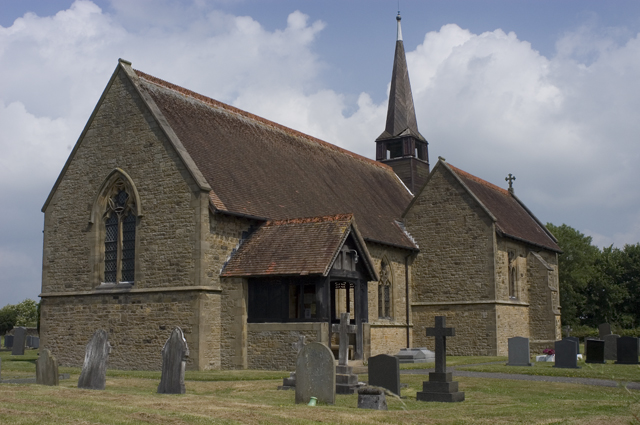
- St Luke's Church, Winmarleigh

- Shown within Wyre Borough Location within Lancashire
- Population: 303 (2021)
- OS grid reference: SD467447
- Civil parish: Winmarleigh
- District: Wyre
- Shire county: Lancashire
- Region: North West
- Country: England
- Sovereign state: United Kingdom
- Post town: PRESTON
- Postcode district: PR3
- Dialling code: 01995
- Police: Lancashire
- Fire: Lancashire
- Ambulance: North West
- UK Parliament: Lancaster and Wyre
- Website: Winmarleigh Parish Council

Winmarleigh is a village and civil parish of the Borough of Wyre in Lancashire, England. The population taken at the 2021 Census was 303. The village, which is north-west of Garstang, has an agricultural college, and the Duchy of Lancaster has an estate here. This includes the local pub, the Patten Arms. It is the location of a large manor house, Winmarleigh Hall. Constructed on the orders of the Duchy of Lancaster, it was given to the first Lord Winmarleigh. Since then the house has been donated to NST Travel Group, who have turned the grounds into an outdoor education programme for schools across the country.

Winmarleigh railway station opened in 1870 on the Garstang and Knot-End Railway. It was renamed Nateby railway station in 1902 and closed in 1930.

The school and school house, which date from 1870, were designed by Lancaster architects Paley and Austin.

== Estate ==
The Winmarleigh Estate is an estate of the Duchy of Lancaster holding as part of The Lancashire Survey. The estate holds ownership to the Patten Arms pub.

In March 2011, ten estate farms were offered to the tenant farmers for purchase as a part of a Duchy re-balancing asset plan to reduce its rural assets. Six of the farms were close to closing by June 2012 to their tenant farmers while New Hall Farm's tenant wished to retire. Also a portion of the estate was transferred to the Village Hall Committee as it's adjacent to the Hall and is used for recreation.

== See also ==
- Listed buildings in Winmarleigh
