= Real Scary Television =

NST
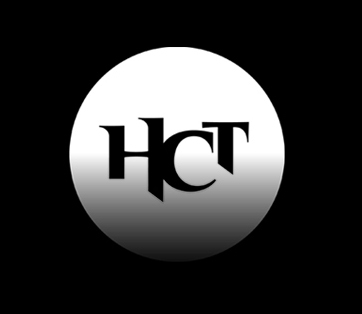
- Country: Russia

History
- Launched: October 1, 2006

Links
- Website: strashnoe.tv

Real Scary Television (Russian: Настоящее страшное телевидение, НСТ; NST) is a Russian TV channel broadcasting films and series in the genres of horror, thriller, mysticism, sci-fi and black humor. It was part of the NKS Media media holding. In 2015, after the merger of assets of VGTRK and Rostelecom, the channel became part of the Digital Television package of thematic TV channels.

== History ==
NST was launched on October 1, 2006. It broadcasts movies and series in the genre of thriller, horror, mystery, sci-fi, black humor, as well as anime and fiction. The channel's inter-program airing consisted of the animated series Monsters, whose main characters were Slasher, Dracula, Mummy, and Zombie.

NST also showed thematic documentary programs of its own production: "Encyclopedia of Horror" (all about horror films), Masterpieces of Horror, "World of Anime" (all about Japanese animation "anime" and comics "manga"), "DOOM and more" (all about video games in the Horror genre). On October 3, 2011, the channel underwent a rebranding. On December 23, 2016, the channel switched to widescreen broadcasting (from 4:3 to 16:9) and became available with stereo sound.

== Reception ==
The channel has an audience of more than 11,714,000 subscribers. The channel is broadcast on many cable and satellite networks (Tricolor TV, Rostelecom, Dom.ru TV, Intersvyaz and many others).

According to a study conducted by Mediascope (formerly TNS Russia), the TV channel "Real Scary Television" was among the top ten TV channels with the largest audience in the 2016/2017 TV season. Thus, NST ranked 10th with an audience share of 0.32%, an average daily reach of 1.69% and a viewing time of 47 minutes. In the 2018-2019 TV season, the channel ranked eighth among thematic channels in Russia, and 35th among all TV channels in the country.

The channel has repeatedly supported horror films at the Russian box office.

== Awards ==
In 2017, the TV channel received a bronze award at the MediaBrand competition for its advertising layout in the Best Print category.
