= South Otterington =

Village and civil parish in North Yorkshire, England

Coordinates: 54°16′53″N 1°25′39″W

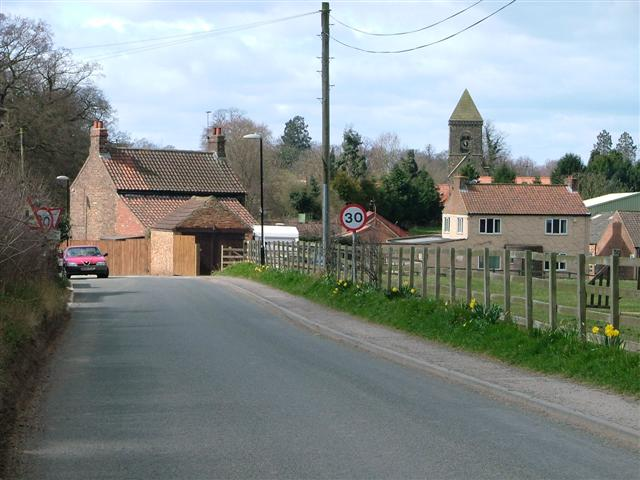
- Approaching South Otterington from the east

- Location within North Yorkshire
- Population: 347 (2011 census)
- OS grid reference: SE374875
- Civil parish: South Otterington
- Unitary authority: North Yorkshire
- Ceremonial county: North Yorkshire
- Region: Yorkshire and the Humber
- Country: England
- Sovereign state: United Kingdom
- Post town: NORTHALLERTON
- Postcode district: DL7
- Police: North Yorkshire
- Fire: North Yorkshire
- Ambulance: Yorkshire
- UK Parliament: Thirsk and Malton

South Otterington is a village and civil parish in the county of North Yorkshire, England. It is located on the A167 road 5 miles (8 km) south of Northallerton and on the east bank of the River Wiske.

== History ==
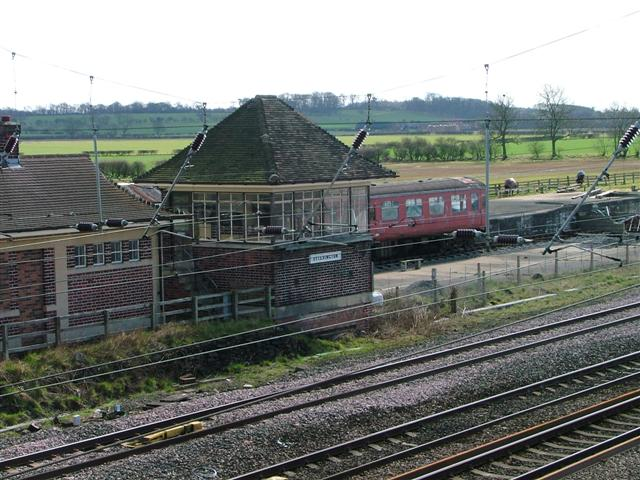
Otterington Signal Box

Otterinctune in the Allerton hundred is mentioned in the Domesday Book. The manor was split between Egelfride and Haldor at the time of the Norman invasion and subsequently passed to the Crown.

Part of the manor was granted to Robert Brus, whose family held it until 1242 when it was granted to Byland Abbey who held it until the dissolution. Another part of the manor was granted to the Fossard family who held it until 1279 when it was passed to Richard Malbiche. At some point in the early 17th century, most of the lands of the manor were in the possession of the Talbot family of Thornton-le-Moor. The name is probably from Old English relating to a person named Otter and the suffix tun meaning settlement.

Otterington station on the North Eastern Railway mainline between Thirsk and Northallerton opened on 31 March 1841 and closed to passengers 15 September 1958 before final closure on 10 August 1964. The station was next to the road bridge over the lines. The former station building, signal box and other features are Grade II listed structures.

== Governance ==
The village is in the Thirsk and Malton UK Parliament constituency. From 1974 to 2023 it was part of the Hambleton District, it is now administered by the unitary North Yorkshire Council.

== Geography ==
The nearest settlements are Newby Wiske 0.5 miles (0.8 km) to the west and Thornton-le-Moor 1.1 miles (1.8 km) to the east. The village is located to the east of the River Wiske on the A167 road. Howe Beck flows through the north end of the village to join the River Wiske.

== Demography ==
The 1881 UK Census recorded the population as 349. The 2001 UK Census recorded the population as 344, of which 269 were over the age of sixteen years and of those, 181 were in employment. There were 141 dwellings of which 85 were detached. The split of male to females was 47.4% and 52.6% respectively. The mean age of the population was 37.98 years old.

== Transport ==
The East Coast Main Line passes to the east of the village. The former Otterington railway station, on Station Road, closed in 1958.

The North Yorkshire County Council bus service 153 runs 3 times daily from Northallerton to Thirsk via Thornton-le-Moor, South Otterington, Sandhutton and Carlton Miniott.

== Education ==
A school was built in the village in 1856. A new building, South Otterington CE Primary School, was built in 1993 to accommodate an expansion in pupil numbers following the closure of the schools in nearby Newby Wiske and Thornton-le-Moor. It incorporates pre-school facilities.

== Religion ==
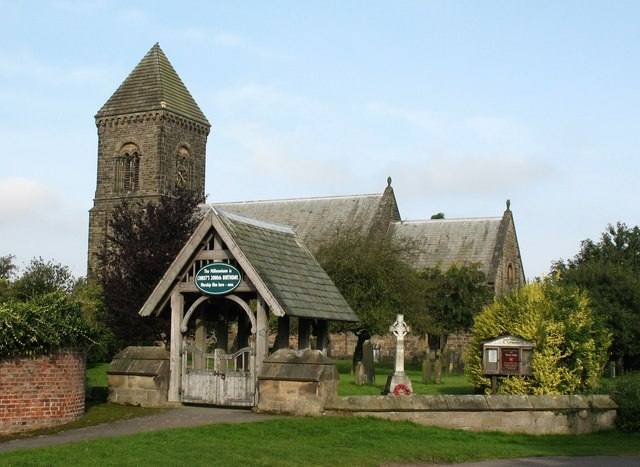
St Andrew's Church, South Otterington

St Andrew's Church, South Otterington, is a Grade II Listed building built in 1847 by Anthony Salvin. It is on the site of an earlier Norman church.

== Notable inhabitants ==
- Andy Preston, a former Mayor of Middlesbrough and hedge fund manager, has lived at Otterington Hall since at least 2007.

== See also ==
- Listed buildings in South Otterington
