= Otterington railway station =

Disused railway station in North Yorkshire, England

Otterington
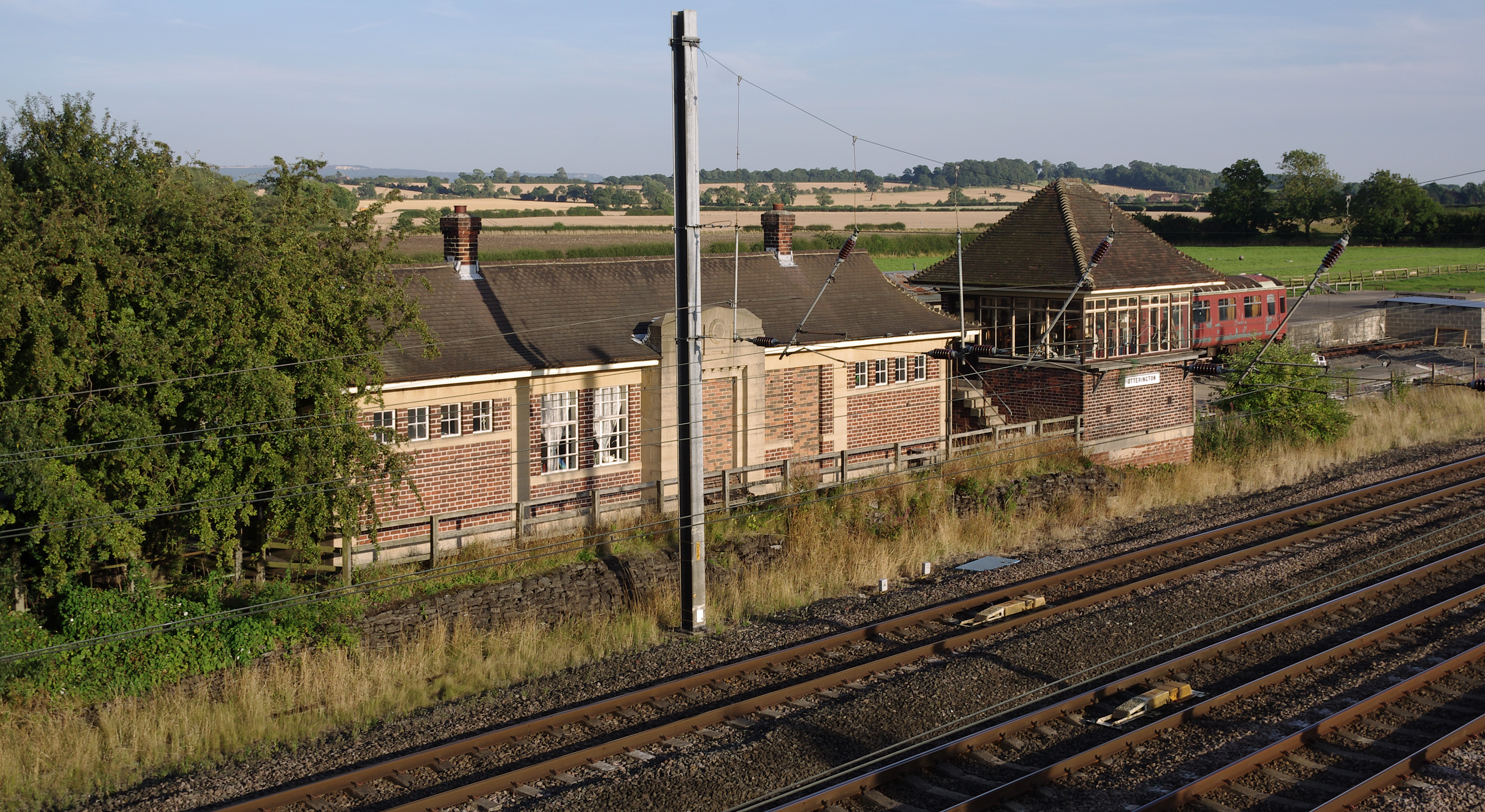
- The station in 2012, now a private residence.

General information
- Location: South Otterington, North Yorkshire; England
- Coordinates: 54.2853°N 1.4166°W
- Platforms: 2

Other information
- Status: Disused

History
- Original company: Great North of England Railway
- Pre-grouping: North Eastern Railway (UK)

Key dates
- 31 March 1841: Opened
- 15 September 1958: Closed
Location

Otterington railway station was located in the village of South Otterington, North Yorkshire, on the East Coast Main Line. It opened in 1841 and closed in 1958. The station is now a private residence, though the platform can still be seen. The buildings date from the 1930s when the East Coast Main Line was widened.

The station became a listed building in 2018.

== See also ==
- Listed buildings in South Otterington

Preceding station	Historical railways	Following station
Thirsk; Line and station open	North Eastern Railway; East Coast Main Line	Northallerton; Line and station open
