= Otterington Hall =

Listed building in North Yorkshire, England

Coordinates: 54°17′27″N 1°25′40″W

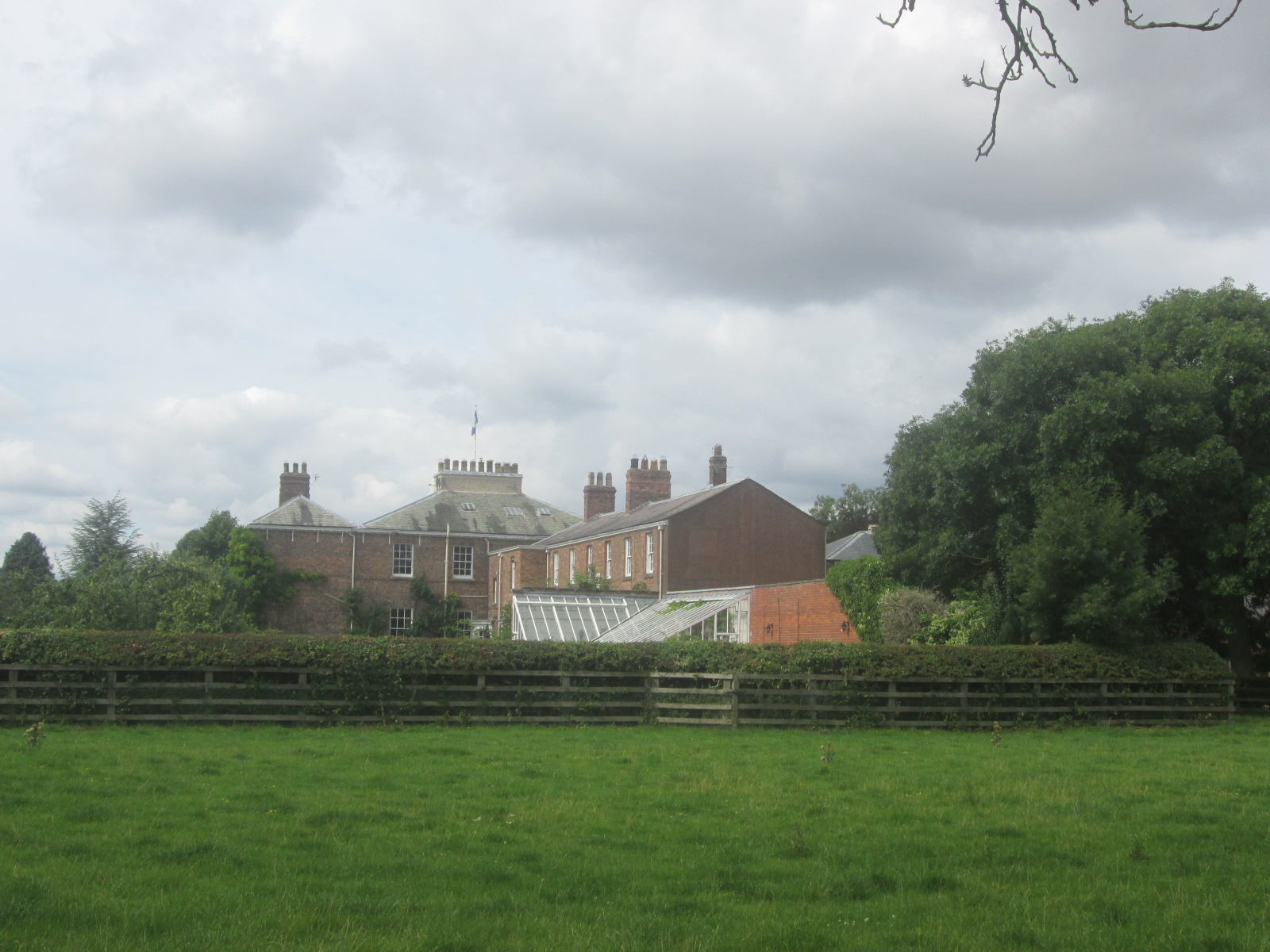
Otterington Hall, August 2013

Otterington Hall is a Grade II listed mansion in South Otterington, near Northallerton, North Yorkshire, England.

Otterington Hall lies in South Otterington, three miles south of Northallerton, on the A167.

One of the earlier occupants, from before 1831 until his death in 1837, was Captain John George Boss (1781–1837) R.N. He had a distinguished naval career, being involved in the capture of several French vessels and the protection of British trading interests in the Caribbean during the Napoleonic Wars. He was a Member of Parliament for the Northallerton constituency (1832–1835) and he gained the rank of captain in November 1833. He married twice: Charlotte Robinson (née Pennyman) in 1814, who died in 1832 aged 56, and Elizabeth Wylie in 1834.

Otterington Hall was the birthplace of British anti-fascist, linguist, and photographer, Alec Wainman.

It was home to the Furness family for many years, and they were responsible for planting much of its topiary gardens from the 1920s onwards, "one of the best topiary gardens in England and certainly the best in Yorkshire".

It has been home to Andy Preston, the Mayor of Middlesbrough and a former hedge fund manager, and his wife since at least 2007. In 2015, Preston was criticised for using his parents' Middlesbrough address on his nomination papers, rather than that of his actual home, but he denied breaking election rules.

The Hall was listed for sale with Savills in 2023, at an asking price of £4,000,000.
