= Newby Wiske Hall =

Building in Newby Wiske, North Yorkshire, England

Coordinates: 54.2823°N 1.4389°W

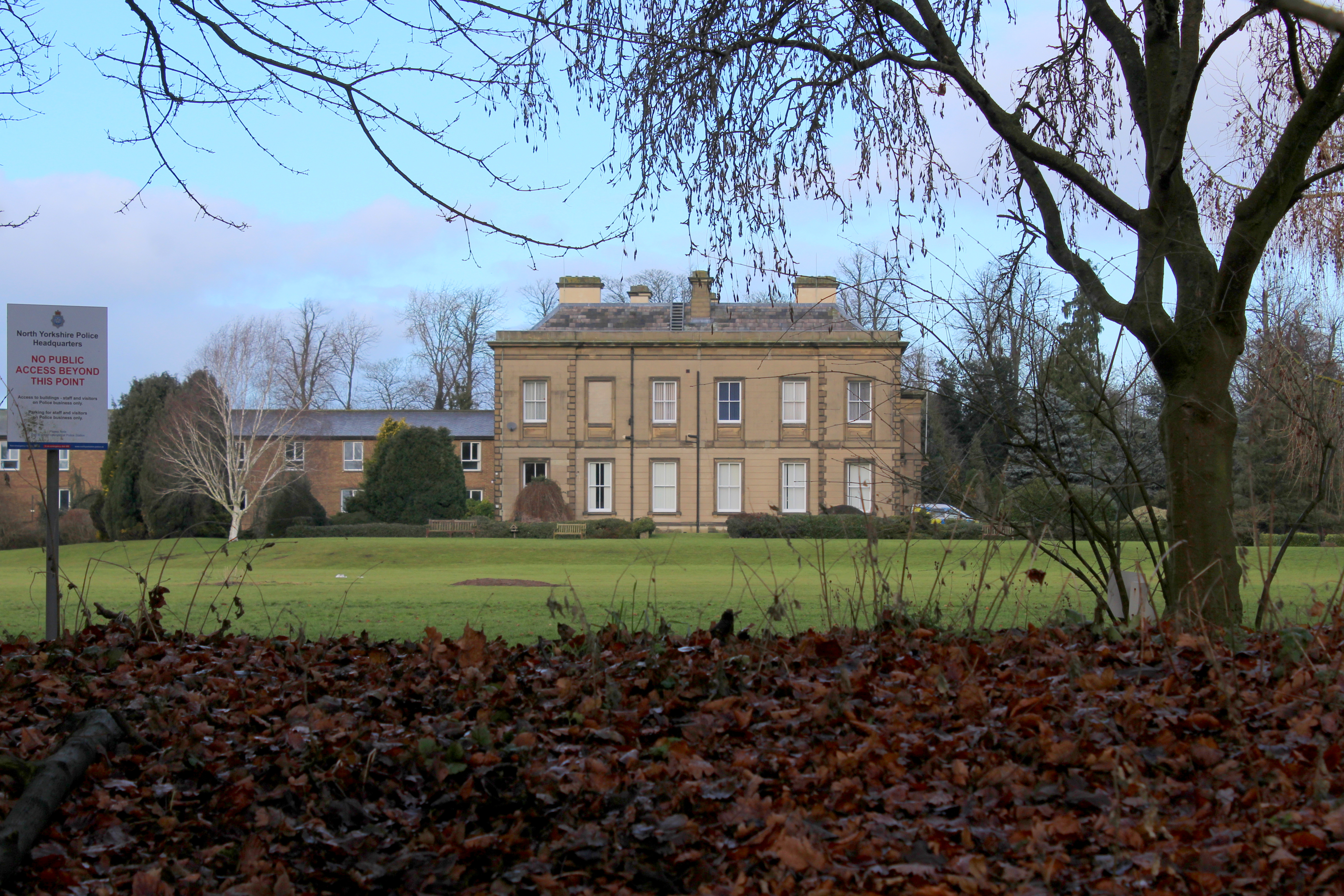
The building, in 2018

Newby Wiske Hall is a historic building in Newby Wiske, a village in North Yorkshire, in England.

The country house was built in 1684 for William Reveley. The hall was altered in the 18th century, and passed through various owners, including William Mitford. In 1829, William Rutson purchased the hall, then extended it and made extensive alterations. In 1954, the Home Office purchased the house for £13,000, and converted into a police training centre. In 1977, it became the headquarters of North Yorkshire Police. The building was grade II listed in 1985. In 2017, the building was sold and converted into a children's outdoor activity centre.

The house is rendered, with stone dressings and has Welsh slate roofs. The main front has two storeys and attics, eleven bays, the outer bays projecting, with a lower two-storey four-bay wing to the right, and later rear additions. The main block has a plinth, a floor band, a frieze, a cornice and blocking course, and a hipped roof. In the centre is a two-storey porch with a round-arched opening, pilasters, an architrave and a keystone, above which is a small balcony. The windows in the lower two floors of the middle nine bays are sashes with architraves, those in the middle floor also with friezes and cornices, and in the top floor they are casements with architraves. The outer bays have rusticated ground floors, and quoins. The windows in the ground floor are tripartite with Doric pilasters, a frieze and a cornice, and in the middle floor are Venetian windows with Ionic pilasters, friezes, cornices and keystones. Inside, there is a grand late-19th century staircase, and several chimney pieces of similar date.

== See also ==
- Listed buildings in Newby Wiske
