= NST (company) =

British educational travel company

NST or the NST Travel Group is a British educational travel company, part of the Holidaybreak group of companies.

== Overview ==
NST provides curriculum-focused tailor-made tours for primary schools, secondary schools and sixth form colleges, taking students to destinations across the UK, Europe and worldwide.

It is one of the leaders in educational travel and is the largest of its type in the UK, annually taking more than 4000 school groups on tours at home and abroad.

NST deals only with Schools and Colleges, arranging group student travel through the teachers. Parents are not able to deal directly with the company.

NST employs over 400 people, 240 of which are full-time, the remainder being seasonal workers. In the UK its Head Office is in Blackpool. An associate company, NST Ltd, based in Dublin, represents NST in Ireland.

Annual turnover is in excess of £50 million.

== Tours & Activities ==
Tours and activities are devised and developed with teachers and subject matter experts providing a foundation on which tailor-made trips can be built. They are either subject-led or are general travel programmes relevant for groups of different ages, studying a wide and diverse range of subjects. The tours provide a strong educational and learning focus in a safe environment. They also do guided History and Religious Studies trips.

Tours to a huge range of destinations across the UK, including capital cities, centres of cultural interest, castles and historic sites, town, country and coastal locations. International destinations include:

- Belgium
- China
- France
- Germany
- India
- Italy
- Netherlands
- Poland
- Russia
- Spain
- United States

Subject-specific itineraries include:

- Art & Design
- Business Studies
- Economics and Politics
- Classical Studies
- English and Drama
- Geography
- History
- Media and Film Studies
- French, German & Spanish Languages
- Music
- Cultural Experiences
- Outdoor and Adventure Activities
- Religious Studies

An NST tour gives students the chance to engage with local cultures, local peoples and their customs, to learn and develop new languages and to taste new and different food. This brings different elements to their education and provides an opportunity to learn outside the classroom, in ways that might not otherwise be afforded to them.

The company has two residential centres, one in the UK and one in France, bought specifically to encourage outdoors and adventure activities.

== History ==
=== Pre 1990 ===
In 1967 Vin Craven, a former maths teacher from Millfield High School in Thornton, Lancashire founded NST as Northern Schools Travel. Craven identified an opportunity within the education sector to create and establish educationally-focused travel arrangements. Focusing initially on coach tours, the company later expanded into air travel to meet the growing demand for international educational experiences. The first trip overseas was to the Opal Coast in France.

Craven's sons John and David joined the company in 1979 and 1982 respectively.

In 1983 the company changed its name to NST and began a period of rapid expansion and acquisition.

=== 1990 to 2000 ===
By 1992 NST was one of the UK's leading school travel companies with an annual turnover of approximately £5 million.

In 1992 ETS Travel was created to offer air tours and sports tours to schools to complement the educational coach tours already operated by NST.

StudyLink, a company specialising in coach tours for university and college groups was bought in 1993. Wanting to formally recognise the importance safety plays in any educational tour, NST decided to document their safety procedures in conjunction with Royal Society for the Prevention of Accidents (RoSPA). This led to the development of a School Tour Operators Safety Management System.

SETA, a leading Scottish school travel company was added to NST's portfolio in 1994. A Music Tours Division was created in 1995 and ETS created a specialist division, ‘ETS StudyLink’, operating air tours for university and college groups to complement the coach tours operated by NST StudyLink.

To expand their range of sports tours, the specialist sports travel company Sportsclass was acquired by ETS in 1996, resulting in the creation of ETS Sportsclass. 1996 also saw NST Limited being established in Dublin. NST Limited is now a leader in the school and group market for the whole of Ireland.

An Adventure Division was created in January 1997 and the company purchased Winmarleigh Hall, a Victorian mansion set in 50 acres (200,000 m^{2}) of woods and parkland south of Lancaster, UK, from where a combined Outdoor Activities and Educational programme operates. NST and ETS formally merged to become NST.

By December 1997 NST had a turnover of approximately £9 million and employed 50 staff. The sister company ETS had a turnover of £6 million and employed 28 staff. The combined volumes of the two companies made them Europe's leading educational tour operator. A decision to merge the two companies was taken. This resulted in four new divisions being established.

In 1998 the Group Travel Company was created, providing adult group tours. Seeing a demand for religious-specific travel, Tours for Churches, a specialist division dealing only with religious groups, was also set up that year.

In January 1999 NST bought the Château d'Ebblinghem, located in the Nord département between the towns of Saint-Omer and Hazebrouck. This residential education centre opened in February 2000 and is used as part of the study programmes offered by NST.

=== 2000 onwards ===
In May 2000, Dun and Bradstreet ranked NST as the 41st-fastest-growing company in the UK from their database of over 2 million companies. 2001 saw the merger of NST Studylink and ETS Studylink to create one brand, Studylink, focused solely on the University and College group market. In 2002, struggling Scottish schools tour operator Top Class Travel was acquired.

The company's first formal long term Strategic Plan was launched in 2003 clearly stating expected achievements in the coming five years. In August 2003, NST acquired Blue Chip School Travel, a leading UK operator of English and Drama visits.

The Company refined its structure again in January 2006 by merging the three Blackpool-based school divisions. Young World Travel, a small specialist educational travel company was bought in March 2006. The Sports Tours business was sold off and The Group Travel Company was acquired. NST sold off its Sports Tours business and merged The Group Travel Company and Tours for Churches into two of the larger divisions.

On 30 September 2007, NST was acquired by Holidaybreak PLC and became part of the Education Division of that company. NST was restructured once more in 2008 to refocus operations and to improve efficiencies in one location.

== Safety & Quality ==
From the outset, NST believed that the safety of the students in their care had to be the number one priority. They pioneered many developments in school operator safety management systems. NST trips meet the latest Department for Children Schools and Families (DCSF) and Scottish Executive advice. NST are a founding member of the Schools Travel Forum. The School Travel Forum was developed in conjunction with, and is annually inspected by, suitably qualified external bodies, the sole objective of which is the continual improvement of safety standards. It helps trip organisers deliver their obligations on educational visits.

Since 1994 NST has operated a Safety Management System, developed in conjunction with RoSPA. Argent Health and Safety (Argent Health & Safety) audit this annually.

NST have worked with Government and industry leaders on advancing quality as an integral part of educational travel. The Quality Badge Scheme (QBS) was launched on 2 October 2008 as part of the UK Government's ‘Learning Outside the Classroom’ (LotC)initiative. NST piloted the QBS and was one of the first companies to apply for, and receive, formal accreditation.

NST's activity centres in Winmarghleigh Hall, Lancashire and Lou Valagran, South of France are British Activity Holiday Association (BAHA) approved, conforming to their strict code of practice covering safety and service delivery in both the centres and on activities.
