= River Wiske =

River in North Yorkshire, England

River Wiske Foulbroke (Foul Brook)
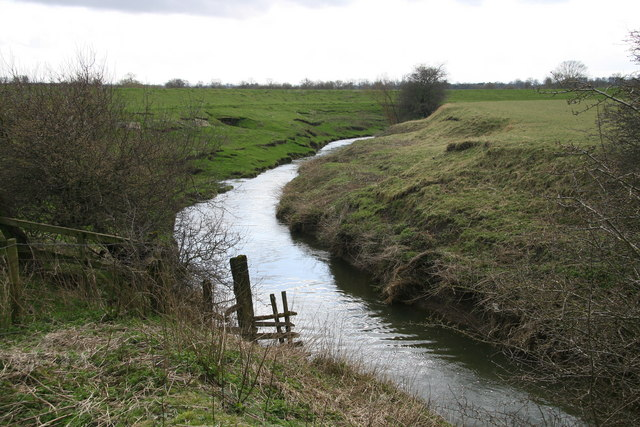
- River Wiske close to its confluence with the River Swale

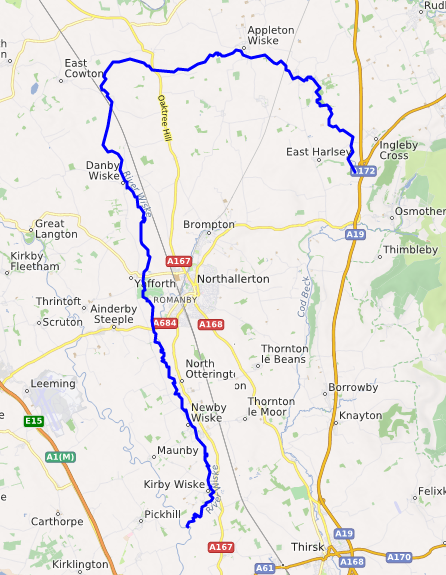

Location
- Country: England

Physical characteristics
- Source
  - location: Confluence of Stony Lane Beck and Carr Beck nr Ingleby Arncliffe
  - coordinates: 54°23′10″N 1°19′25″W
  - elevation: 69 metres (226 ft)
- Mouth
  - location: River Swale nr Kirby Wiske
  - coordinates: 54°14′38″N 1°26′19″W
  - elevation: 21 metres (69 ft)
- Length: 46.9 kilometres (29.1 mi)
- Basin size: 215.5 square kilometres (83.2 sq mi)

The River Wiske is a tributary of the River Swale in Yorkshire, England. The Wiske gives its name to several villages it passes through. The name Wiske is derived from an Old English word wisca meaning a water meadow. It was once known as the Foulbroke, a name for which some writers commented that it was well deserved.

The river was maintained by the River Wiske Internal Drainage Board, which was part of the Shires Group of IDBs. It is within the national character areas (NCAs) of the Vale of Mowbray and the Tees Lowlands.

== Course ==
The river becomes the Wiske at the confluence of Carr Beck and Stony Lane Beck south of Ingleby Arncliffe close to the Tontine Bridge where the A19 and A172 roads diverge. It flows north in a series of meanders to East Rounton where it turns north-westerly and then westerly past Appleton Wiske. The river continues to flow westerly until just after passing under the A167 road near Great Smeaton where it turns south. It follows a mainly southerly direction towards Danby Wiske, Yafforth, and Northallerton. The river then alternates between a southerly and south-south-easterly direction until it passes Kirby Wiske, where it turns south-west to join the River Swale. Water from the river eventually enters the sea at Spurn Head at the mouth of the Humber Estuary.

== History ==
During the drought of 1995/96 Yorkshire Water installed a pipeline connecting the River Tees near Darlington to the river near Birkby, south of Great Smeaton. It enables water to be transferred from the Tyne and Wear into the Tees and then to the Wiske for pumping out from the River Ouse at York. Although the pipeline was never used it was tested and remains as an "insurance policy". There are ongoing concerns about the biological impact of mixing water in Yorkshire's rivers.

The river is maintained by the Swale and Ure Internal Drainage Board. It was maintained by the River Wiske IDB until 2012 when five IDBs in the Vale of Mowbray and Hambleton District were combined into one.

The Wiske suffers from pollution and flooding problems. Pollution is high nitrogen content from the agricultural industry and excess water from the A19 flows into the river at its source. Flooding of villages on its route and its tributaries (such as Brompton near Northallerton) is a problem because of limited availability of land upstream to store water in times of high flow. The Environment Agency and the Yorkshire Wildlife Trust, have undertaken work along the course of the river to remediate the issues.

== Geology ==
The River Wiske is underlain by a range of geological deposits, including undifferentiated sandstone, conglomerate, undifferentiated mudstone, siltstone and sandstone from the Triassic period, and the Lias group consisting of mudstone, siltstone, limestone and sandstone from the Mesozoic period.

== Natural history ==
There are four non-statutory Nature Conservation Sites along the river: Middlebrough plantation just outside Newby Wiske; Stony Lane Pond near the confluence of Stony Lane Beck and Carr Beck; Pepper Arden Bottoms near East Cowton and Pheasantry Wood and Fox Covert near Danby Wiske.

The river passes through farmland bounded by hedgerows with some wet woodland near Kirby Wiske and some grassland near Newby Wiske. Biodiversity audits carried out in 2010 found European water vole on the river between Danby Wiske and Brompton Beck. European otters were found on the river between North Otterington and Kirby Wiske. Soprano pipistrelle and brown long-eared bat were also found in the area along with kingfisher, reed bunting and lapwing.

== Lists ==
=== Tributaries ===
- East Rounton Stell
- Welbury Stell
- Carr Bridge Stell
- The Stell
- Willow Beck
- Howe Beck
- Spudling Dike
- Sike Stell

=== Settlements ===
- Ingleby Arncliffe
- East Rounton
- West Rounton
- Appleton Wiske
- Great Smeaton
- Birkby
- Hutton Bonville
- Danby Wiske
- Yafforth
- Northallerton
- Warlaby
- North Otterington
- Newby Wiske
- South Otterington
- Kirby Wiske

=== Crossings ===
- Baulk Bridge, Ingleby Arncliffe
- East Rounton Bridge, East Rounton
- West Rounton Bridge, West Rounton
- Wiske Railway Bridge, Middlesbrough branchline
- Wiske Bridge, Appleton Wiske
- Unnamed road near Hornby Grange Farm
- Smeaton Bridge, A167
- Unnamed road near Frigdale
- Wiske Bridge, Birkby
- Railway Bridge, East Coast Main Line
- Wiske Bridge, Danby Wiske
- Yafforth Bridge, B6271
- Wensleydale Railway Bridge
- Viewly Bridge, Ainderby Road, A684
- Howden Bridge, nr Romanby
- Unnamed road nr North Otterington
- Otterington Bridge, between Newby Wiske and South Otterington
- Kirby Bridge, Kirby Wiske
- Pivet Bridge (foot), nr Kirby Wiske

== Gallery ==
River Wiske Images
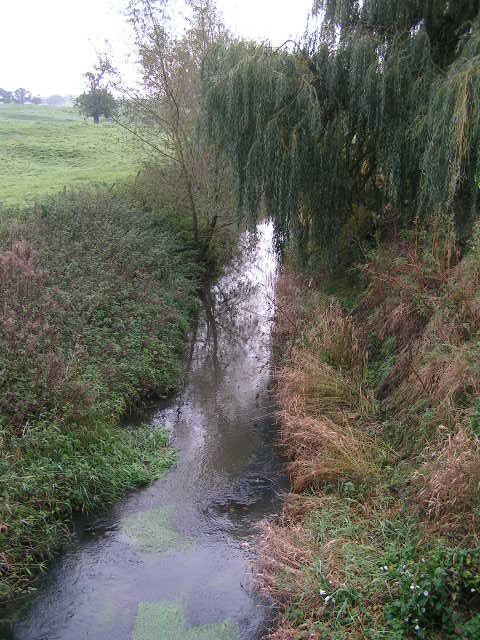
River Wiske near Danby.
54.382685°N 1.482633°W

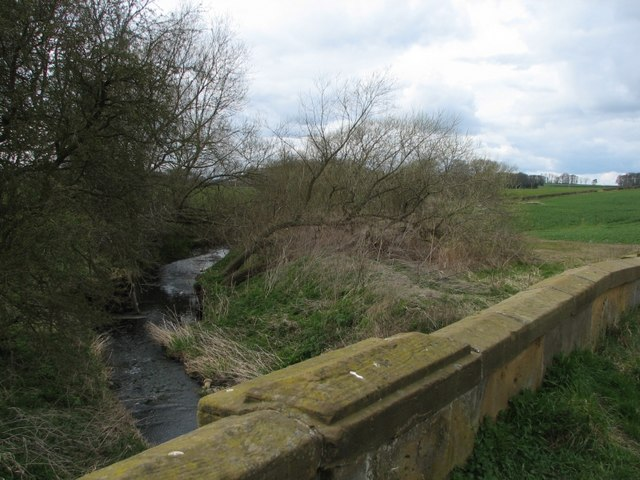
The River Wiske flowing under the old A167 bridge.
54.426645°N 1.465125°W

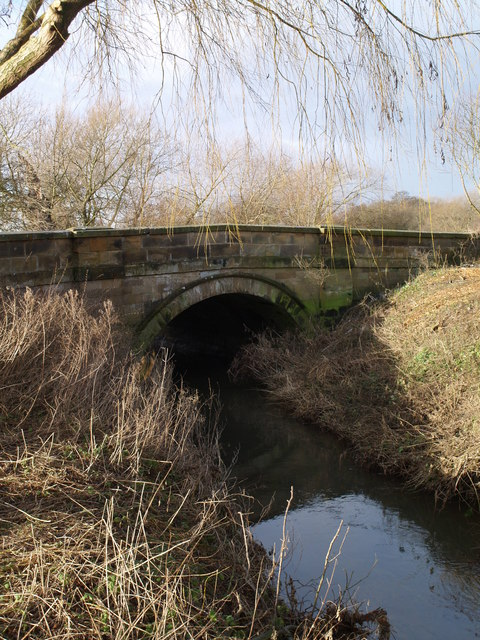
Little Smeaton Bridge over the River Wiske.
54.426816°N 1.462965°W

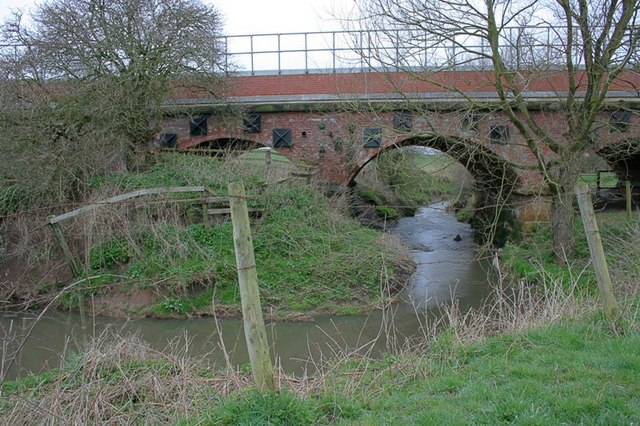
River Wiske flowing under the Wiske Railway Bridge.
54.428799°N 1.371070°W

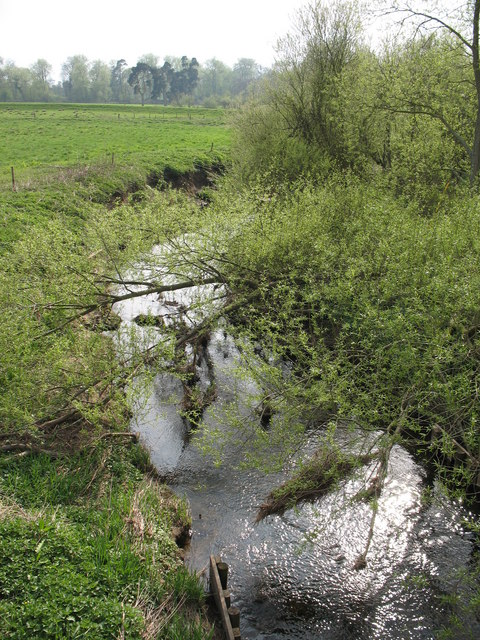
River Wiske looking downstream from Kirby Wiske bridge
54.256951°N 1.422807°W
