= North Yorkshire Police =

English territorial police force

- Abbreviation: NYP

Agency overview
- Formed: 1 April 1974; 52 years ago
- Annual budget: £146.8 million

Jurisdictional structure
- Operations jurisdiction: North Yorkshire, York
- Map of North Yorkshire Police's jurisdiction
- Area: 8,310 square kilometres (3,210 sq mi)
- Population: 0.813 million
- Constituting instrument: Police Act 1996
- General nature: Local civilian police

Operational structure
- Overseen by: His Majesty's Inspectorate of Constabulary and Fire & Rescue Services; Independent Office for Police Conduct
- Headquarters: Northallerton
- Sworn members: 1,370 (of which 158 are Special Constables)
- Mayor responsible: David Skaith, (L Co-op)
- Agency executive: Tim Forber (2024–), Chief constable
- Safer Neighbourhood Commands: 6

Facilities
- Stations: 24
- Custody Suites: 3

Website
- www.northyorkshire.police.uk

North Yorkshire Police is the territorial police force covering the unitary authorities of North Yorkshire and the City of York in northern England. As of April 2024 the force had a strength of 1,665 police officers, 127 special constables, 192 PCSOs and 1,072 police staff. Of the 43 territorial police forces in England and Wales, the force has the 3rd largest geographic area of responsibility whilst being the 15th smallest force in terms of police officer numbers.

== History ==
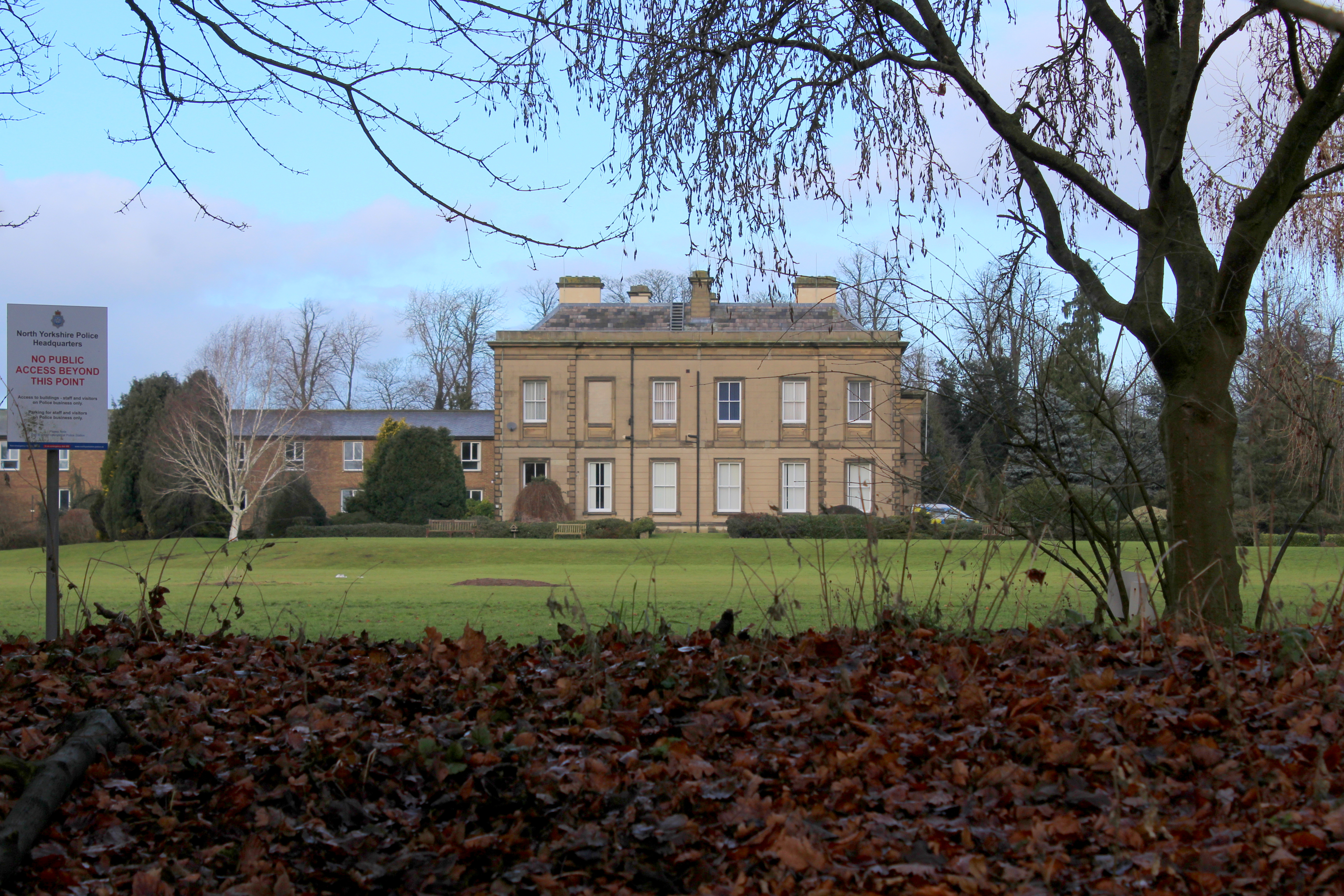
Newby Wiske Hall, the headquarters of North Yorkshire Police from 1976 to 2017

The force was formed on 1 April 1974, under the Local Government Act 1972, and was largely a successor to the York and North East Yorkshire Police, also taking part of the old West Riding Constabulary's area. The York and North East Yorkshire Police had covered the North Riding of Yorkshire, the East Riding of Yorkshire and the county borough of York; it was itself formed in 1968 from a merger of the two riding forces with the York City Police.

Proposals made by the Home Secretary on 21 March 2006 would have seen the force merge with West Yorkshire Police, South Yorkshire Police and Humberside Police to form a strategic police force for the entire region. However, these proposals were later dropped.

It was announced in January 2007 that the then chief constable, Della Cannings, would be retiring from the force on 16 May 2007 due to illness. Cannings made the headlines on a number of occasions. She was not allowed to purchase wine from Tesco in Northallerton in March 2004 until she had taken off her hat and epaulettes, as it was illegal to sell alcohol to on-duty police officers. In October 2006, it was revealed that more than £28,000 had been spent to refurbish a shower in her office.

On 19 April 2007, it was announced that Grahame Maxwell was to become the new chief constable. Maxwell began his career with Cleveland Police and served in all ranks up to chief superintendent when he became district commander in Middlesbrough. After completing the Strategic Command Course in 2000, he was appointed as an assistant chief constable with West Yorkshire Police and during his four years there served as the ACC Specialist Operations and ACC Territorial Operations. Maxwell was promoted to deputy chief constable with South Yorkshire Police in January 2005 and become the Chief Constable of North Yorkshire Police on 17 May 2007.

Dave Jones, was appointed as chief constable in 2013 after serving as assistant chief constable at the Police Service of Northern Ireland, where he had command of the Rural Division. He was awarded the Queen's Police Medal in the 2017 New Year Honours List, before retiring from the role in 2018.

In July 2017, the force's headquarters was moved from Newby Wiske Hall to Alverton Court in Northallerton. The new headquarters is the former offices of the Rural Payments Agency. The previous headquarters at Newby Wiske is a grade II listed building and was becoming difficult to upgrade into the 21st century. The memorial stones commemorating those who have served the police in the region have been moved to the new headquarters from Newby Wiske. These include those who have died in the First and the Second World Wars and also those who have died in the line of duty.

In August 2018, it was confirmed that Lisa Winward would become the new chief constable with immediate effect. Winward joined the police in 1993 and has been serving in the North Yorkshire police service since 2008.

== Governance and oversight ==
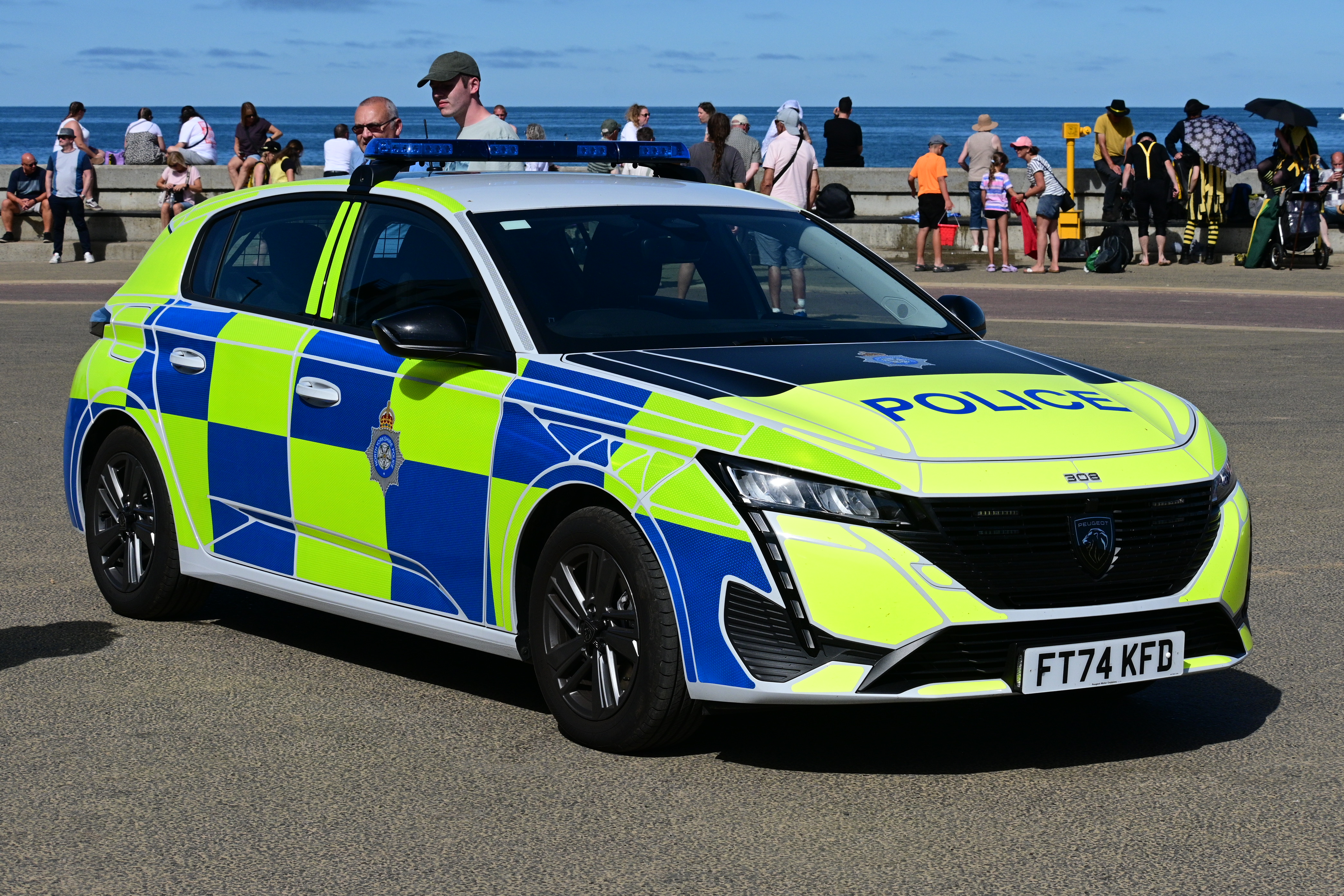
North Yorkshire Police Peugeot 308 in Scarborough in 2025

Since May 2024, the force has been overseen by the elected Mayor of York and North Yorkshire. This mayoral role has also included oversight of the North Yorkshire Fire and Rescue Service.

Previously, until May 2024 the overseer was the North Yorkshire Police and Crime Commissioner, and before November 2012 the North Yorkshire Police Authority had nine councillors (drawn from both North Yorkshire County Council and City of York Council), three justices of the peace, and five independent members. The PFCC was abolished and its functions were transferred to the mayor.

== Chief constables ==
- 1974–1977: Robert Boyes
- 1977–1979: John Woodcock
- 1979–1985: Kenneth Henshaw
- 1985–1989: Peter Nobes
- 1989–1998: David Burke
- 1998–2002: David Kenworthy
- 2002–2007: Della Cannings
- 2007–2012: Graham Maxwell
- 2012–2013: Tim Madgwick
- 2013–2018: Dave Jones
- 2018–2024: Lisa Winward
- 2024–present: Tim Forber

== Officers killed in the line of duty ==
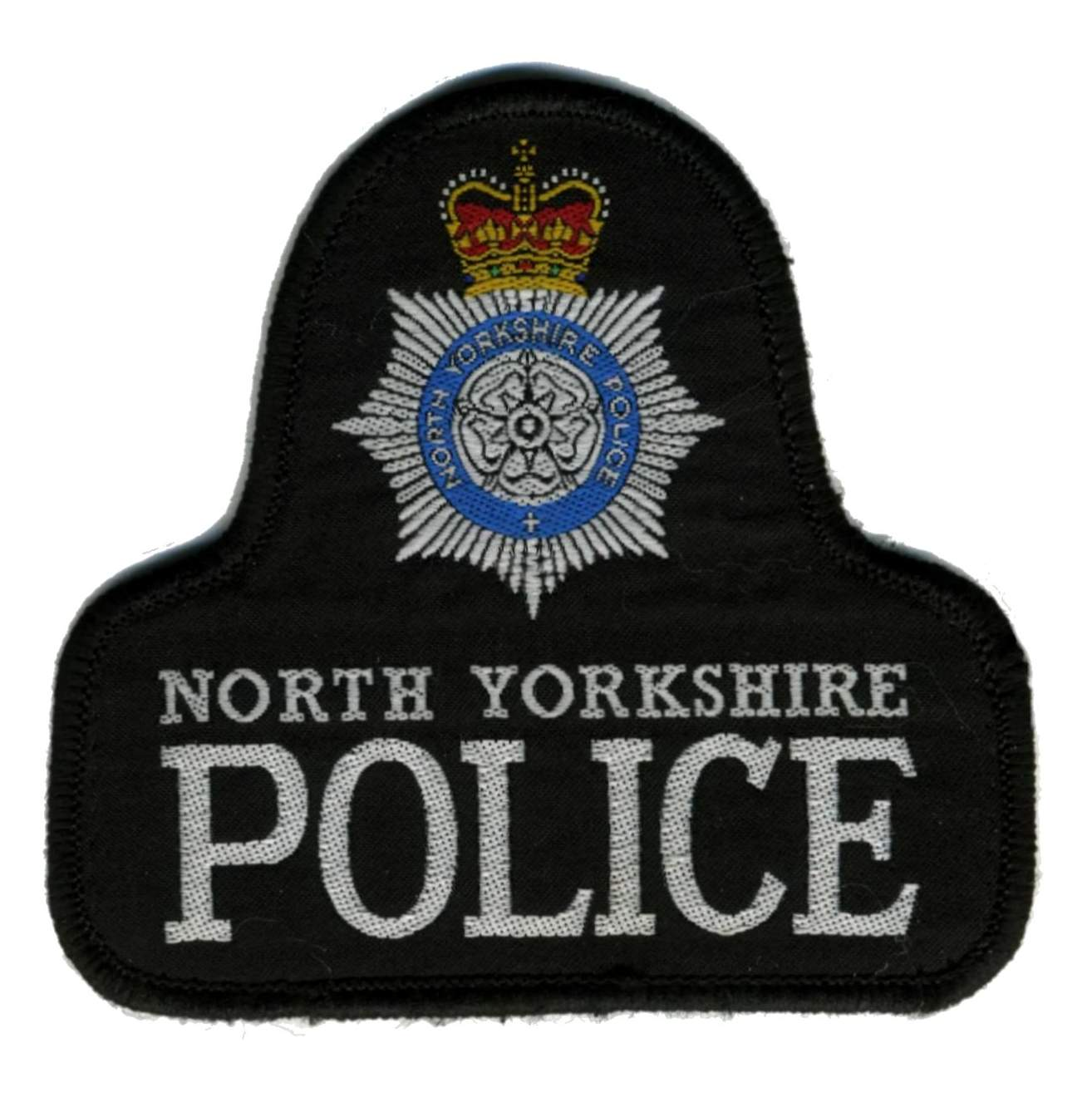
North Yorkshire Police Patch

The Police Roll of Honour Trust and Police Memorial Trust list and commemorate all British police officers killed in the line of duty. Since its establishment in 1984, the Police Memorial Trust has erected 50 memorials nationally to some of those officers.

The following officers of North Yorkshire Police are listed by the trust as having died attempting to prevent, stop or solve a crime, since the turn of the 20th century:

- Acting DC Norman Garnham, 1977 (fatally stabbed during an arrest)
- PC David Ian Haigh, 1982 (shot dead by Barry Prudom)
- Sergeant David Thomas Winter, 1982 (shot dead by Barry Prudom)
- Special constable Glenn Thomas Goodman, 1992 (shot dead; posthumously awarded the Queen's Commendation for Brave Conduct)

== See also ==
- List of law enforcement agencies in the United Kingdom, Crown Dependencies and British Overseas Territories
- Law enforcement in the United Kingdom
