= Smeaton =

Smeaton may refer to:

- Smeaton, East Lothian, a village and estate in Scotland
- Smeaton House, East Lothian, a historic site
- Smeaton, Saskatchewan, a Canadian community
- Smeaton, Victoria, an Australian town
- Smeaton (surname), people with the surname

== See also ==
- Great Smeaton and the neighbouring Little Smeaton, Hambleton in North Yorkshire
- Kirk Smeaton and the neighbouring Little Smeaton, Selby, in Selby district, North Yorkshire
