= East Rounton =

Village and civil parish in North Yorkshire, England

Coordinates: 54°25′25″N 1°21′01″W

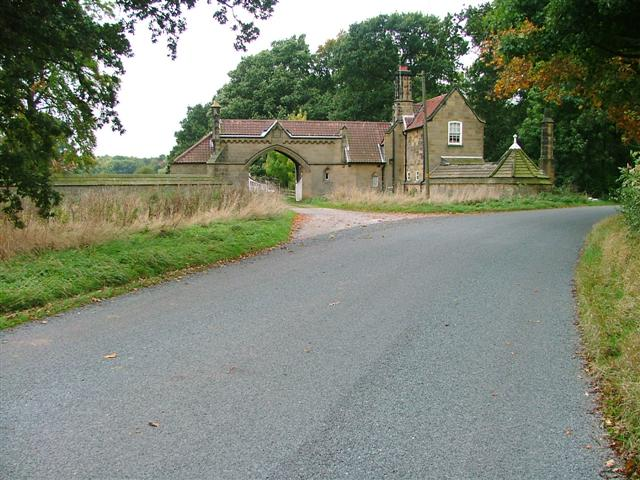
- The Lodge, Rounton Grange, near East Rounton

- Location within North Yorkshire
- OS grid reference: NZ422033
- Unitary authority: North Yorkshire
- Ceremonial county: North Yorkshire
- Region: Yorkshire and the Humber
- Country: England
- Sovereign state: United Kingdom
- Post town: NORTHALLERTON
- Postcode district: DL6
- Police: North Yorkshire
- Fire: North Yorkshire
- Ambulance: Yorkshire

East Rounton is a village and civil parish in the county of North Yorkshire, England. It is about 1 mile (1.6 km) west of the A19 and 8 miles (13 km) north-east of Northallerton. It is on the River Wiske and West Rounton is nearby. The population taken at the 2011 Census was less than 100. Details are included in the civil parish of West Rounton. From 1974 to 2023 it was part of the Hambleton District, it is now administered by the unitary North Yorkshire Council.

East Rounton was the site of Rounton Grange, a country house designed by the architect Philip Webb in 1872 to 1876 for the industrialist Sir Isaac Lowthian Bell. It was demolished in 1953.

== Early history ==
The area was named “Rantune” in the Domesday survey of 1086, valued at £2, and with The Lord being the King, William the Conqueror. St Lawrence's Church, East Rounton is thought to probably date back to the 13th century, but at least to 1483. It was restored by Sir Isaac Lowthian Bell in 1884. In a field to the north of the church are the remains of the medieval village. The village appears on maps of 1577 and 1611, but is absent from later maps of 1645 and 1720. There is an 18th century bridge over the River Wiske, where an old inn used to stand; the Black Horse.

== Recent history ==
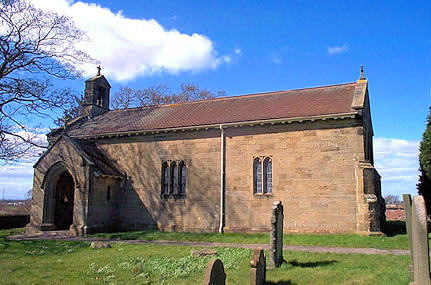
St Lawrence's Church

In 1866, Sir Isaac Lowthian Bell, a scientist and ironmaster (Dorman Long – Middlesbrough) and early patron of the Arts and Crafts movement, bought the estate. Architect Philip Webb was commissioned by Lowthian Bell to design Rounton Grange to replace an existing farmhouse. Building commenced in 1872 and completed in 1876, creating a “landmark of nineteenth century domestic architecture” in the view of Country Life magazine. William Morris and Sir Edward Burne-Jones were engaged as interior designers. Additional buildings were added by Lowthian Bell's son, Sir Hugh Bell, using George Jack as architect, including the East Lodge in 1909 linked by outside electric lights to the Grange.

The Rounton Village Hall, built in 1907 by Tarrans of Hutton Rudby, funded by Sir Hugh & Lady Bell, now includes a War Memorial at the front. The hall is adjoined on either side by three cottages (The Square). It was used during the First World War as a hospital for wounded soldiers, and is still in use today by local residents.

Although the Grange no longer exists, various estate buildings still do, built in the Arts & Crafts style and mostly designed by Philip Webb. These include the Old Lodge, Home Farm, Garden House and walled gardens, the Coach House (used to hold the coaches and a horse-drawn steam-driven fire engine), the Motor House, Keeper's Cottage (home of the gamekeeper to the Grange) and Rounton House, the latter designed by George Jack (Philip Webb's assistant) in 1905 for the use of the estate manager. Pear Tree Cottage was originally the Rest House for sick or injured estate workers.

The Old School House was the village school, opened in 1877 but closed in 1967. Opposite the Village Hall, The School House was the residence of the headmistress. The Old Post Office was the village shop and post office / telegram office, closing in 1979. A stained-glass window memorial to a local resident, Gertrude Bell, granddaughter of Lowthian Bell, historian and extensive traveller, is included in the Church of St Lawrence. It was made by Douglas Strachan and depicts Magdalen College, Oxford and Khadimain, Baghdad. Miss Bell was the subject of a film in 2015, Queen of the Desert, and of a documentary, Letters from Baghdad, the following year.

== See also ==
- Listed buildings in East Rounton
