= Listed buildings in East Rounton =

East Rounton is a civil parish in the county of North Yorkshire, England. It contains twelve listed buildings that are recorded in the National Heritage List for England. Of these, two are listed at Grade II*, the middle of the three grades, and the others are at Grade II, the lowest grade. The parish contains the village of East Rounton and the surrounding area. The most important building in the parish was Rounton Grange, but this was demolished in 1954. Some of the associated structures in the grounds have survived, and are listed. The other listed buildings consist of a church, a bridge, a former school, a village hall, houses and a farmhouse.

== Key ==
Grade	Criteria
II*	Particularly important buildings of more than special interest
II	Buildings of national importance and special interest

== Buildings ==
Name and location	Photograph	Date	Notes	Grade
East Rounton Bridge; 54.42246°N 1.35161°W		Early 19th century	The bridge carries a road over the River Wiske. It is in stone and consists of a single recessed arch. The bridge has voussoirs, a hood mould, and a parapet with rounded coping, sweeping out at the corners, and ending in round piers with flattened domical tops.	II
Hollins House; 54.42466°N 1.33065°W	—	Early 19th century	The house is in brownish brick with a Welsh slate roof. There are two storeys and three bays, and a recessed three-storey single-bay extension to the south. Three steps lead to a central doorway that has a fanlight. The windows are sashes in architraves, with stuccoed lintels incised with false voussoirs, and at the rear is a round-headed stair window.	II
Home Farmhouse and cottages 54.42429°N 1.34172°W		1874	A farmhouse and four cottages on the left, designed by Philip Webb, in red brick with diagonal corner buttresses, a cogged and stepped floor band, and a half-hipped pantile roof. There are two storeys and attics, six bays, and a three-bay rear wing on the right. The doorways have fanlights, the windows are sashes, and all the ground floor openings have segmental relieving arches. The farmhouse on the right has a pent porch.	II
Stable Cottage, Engine House, Corner Cottage and Coachmans Cottage, Rounton Grange; 54.42057°N 1.34400°W		1875	The buildings were designed by Philip Webb, and are in red brick with stone dressings, weatherboarding and plaster, and have pantile roofs. They form a square plan around a covered yard. The main front has two storeys and five bays, with a wide central carriage arch on imposts. Above it is a coved jetty with weatherboarding, and the outer bays are in brick. The windows in the middle bays are sashes, and in the outer bays they are casements. The rear ranges have a single bay.	II*
The Motor House and Fowl House, Rounton Grange; 54.42047°N 1.34432°W	—	1875	The older building was a coach house designed by Philip Webb, in brick with angle buttresses and a pantile roof. There are two storeys, and in the west front are two stable doors and three windows above. The Motor House dates from 1905 and was designed by George Jack. It is timber framed with brick and weatherboarding, and has a pantile roof. The building contains garage doors and a mix of sash and casement windows, some in raking dormers. On the south gable end is an open platform with an ornate balustrade and French windows. On the north front is a datestone.	II
West Lodge, Rounton Grange; 54.42105°N 1.34419°W		c. 1875	The lodge, incorporating earlier material, was designed by Philip Webb. It is in stone, and has a high pyramidal green slate roof. There is a single storey and attics, and fronts of two bays. The entrance is at the rear under a pent roof, and the windows are casements, those in the attic are tall half-dormers with hipped roofs and deep eaves soffits.	II
The Old School; 54.42425°N 1.35058°W	—	1876	The school, later a private house, was designed by Philip Webb. It is in brick with sandstone dressings, mostly pebbledashed, and has a pantile roof with coped gables. There is one storey and attics, and a T-shaped plan with fronts of two bays. The windows are sashes, some with triangular hood moulds, and at the rear is a flat-roofed dormer.	II
St Lawrence's Church; 54.42400°N 1.35153°W		1885	The church, which incorporates earlier material, is in sandstone with a red tile roof. It consists of an undivided nave and chancel, and a south porch. At the west end is a coped gable with a stone bellcote and a cross, and at the east end is a three-light window with a hood mould.	II
Gardener's Cottage, Rounton Grange; 54.42157°N 1.34003°W	—	1905	An estate cottage designed by George Jack, it is roughcast on a brick plinth, with some weatherboarding, deeply-swept eaves and a hipped pantile roof. There are two storeys and three bays, the right bay projecting and gabled, and a lean-to on the left. The doorway has a zinc hood, and the windows are casements.	II
Rounton House; 54.42285°N 1.34982°W	—	1905	The house, designed by George Jack, is in pebbledashed brick, and has a hipped pantile roof extending into catslides at the sides. There are two storeys, a central block of three bays, and flanking recessed single-bay wings. In the angle on the right is a small porch, the windows in the main block are sashes, and in the wings they are casements. In the centre is a round-arched recess containing a window, above which is a plaque.	II
Village Hall; 54.42342°N 1.35080°W		1906	The village hall and attached cottages, forming a U-shaped plan, were designed by George Jack, and are in brick, partly pebbledashed, with hipped swept pantile roofs, and two storeys. The village hall has seven bays divided by buttresses with shaped heads, and a dentilled string course. The middle bay projects and contains an oriel window in the upper floor, above which is a clock in an open dentilled quasi-pediment. In the outer bays are doorways with segmental heads, the ground floor contains casement windows and the windows in the upper floor are sashes. On the roof is a bell-cupola with a square copper dome and a weathervane. The cottages project as three-bay wings, each with two canted bay windows under a bracketed tiled hood, and elsewhere are sash windows.	II
Lodge, gateway and walls, Rounton Grange; 54.42447°N 1.33518°W		1909	The building, designed by George Jack, is in stone with roofs of pantile and stone flags. The lodge to the right of the entrance has two storeys, segmental-headed sash windows, and a swept roof with curved gable copings and ball finials. Over the entrance is a low arch with pseudo-machicolated eaves, and a small central gable with an escutcheon. To the left is a curved screen wall with stepped gabled coping, ending in an octagonal pier with a ball finial. To the right is a single-storey wing ending is a small octagonal pavilion.	II*
