= Hugh Lee Pattinson =

English industrial chemist and entrepreneur FRS (1796–1858)

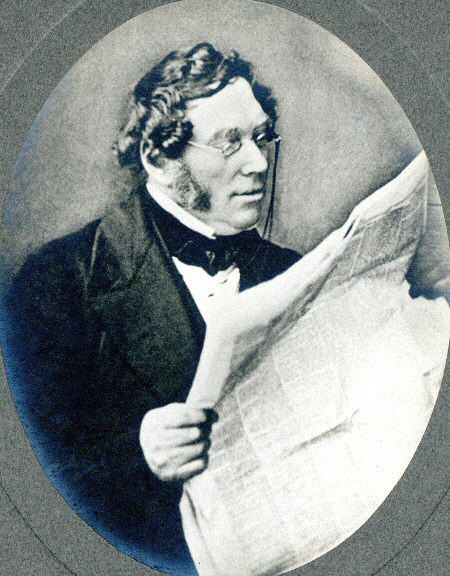
- Born: 25 December 1796; Alston, Cumberland
- Died: 11 November 1858 (aged 61)
- Resting place: Washington, County Durham
- Education: Self-taught
- Known for: Silver refining process, daguerreotypes
- Spouse: Phoebe Walton
- Scientific career
- Fields: Metallurgy, Industrial chemistry

Hugh Lee Pattinson FRS (25 December 1796 – 11 November 1858) was an English industrial chemist. He was also an entrepreneur, sharing the risk of major industrial developments with famous ironmaster Isaac Lowthian Bell and cable manufacturer Robert Stirling Newall.

Although known in his time for his 1833 patent "An improved method for separating silver from lead", a process that bears his name, he is best remembered today for his daguerreotype photographs taken in 1840. Among these is the earliest known photograph of the Niagara Falls.

== Biography ==
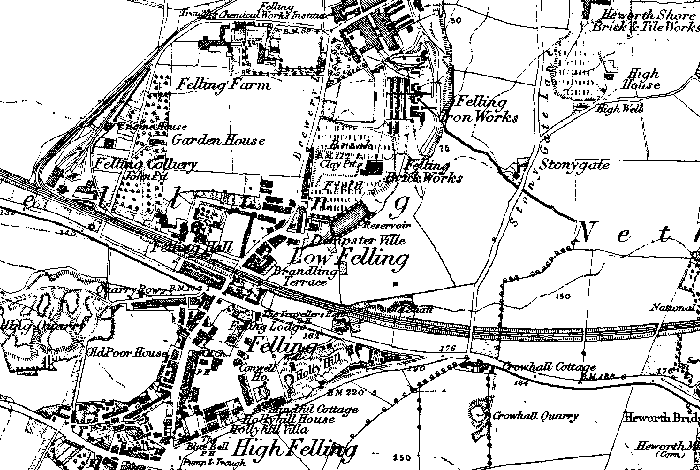
Felling Chemical Works, shown at top of Ordnance Survey map of 1862

Pattinson was the son of Thomas Pattinson, a shopkeeper in the country town of Alston, Cumberland, and his wife Margaret Lee; they were Quakers. He was educated at local private schools. He was interested in science from an early age, doing experiments with electricity when he was 17, and also studying the chemistry of metals.

He began his working life by helping his father in his shop in Alston. In around 1825 he worked for Anthony Clapham, a soap maker in Newcastle-upon-Tyne. In 1825 he became assay master (a tester of the purity of gold or silver coins) to the Greenwich Hospital Commissioners, back at Alston. In continuing experiments in metallurgy, he discovered the basis of his method of separating silver from lead in 1829, but had too little money to go any further. In 1831 he became works manager at Thomas Wentworth Beaumont's lead works. The greater income allowed him to continue his experiments on silver refining until he had a workable process.

In 1834 he resigned from Beaumont's works, and with John Lee and George Burnett, set up a new chemical works at Felling, near Gateshead. It employed around 300 men.

== Pattinson process ==
Pattinson patented his process for enriching silver bearing lead in 1833. It exploited the fact that in molten lead containing traces of silver the first metal to solidify out of the melt is lead, leaving the remaining liquid richer in silver. Pattinson's equipment consisted basically of nothing more complex than a row of about 8–9 iron pots, which were heated from below. Some lead, naturally containing a small percentage of silver, was loaded into the central pot and melted. This was then allowed to cool. As the lead solidified, it was skimmed off and moved to the next pot in one direction, and the remaining metal which was now richer in silver was then transferred to the next pot in the opposite direction. The process was repeated from one pot to the next, the lead accumulating in the pot at one end and metal enriched in silver in the pot at the other. The level of enrichment possible is limited by the lead-silver eutectic and typically the process stopped around 600 to 700 ounces per ton (approx 2%), so further separation is carried out by cupellation.

The patent process, known as pattinsonisation, earned Pattinson £16,000 in royalties. The earlier process of "cupellation" had required at least 8 ounces (230 grams) of silver per ton of lead to be economic. Cupellation involved removing the lead from a silver-rich alloy by oxidising the lead to litharge, leaving the silver behind. Pattinson's process was economic with as little as 2 to 3 ounces (about 75 grams) of silver per ton.

== Daguerreotypes ==
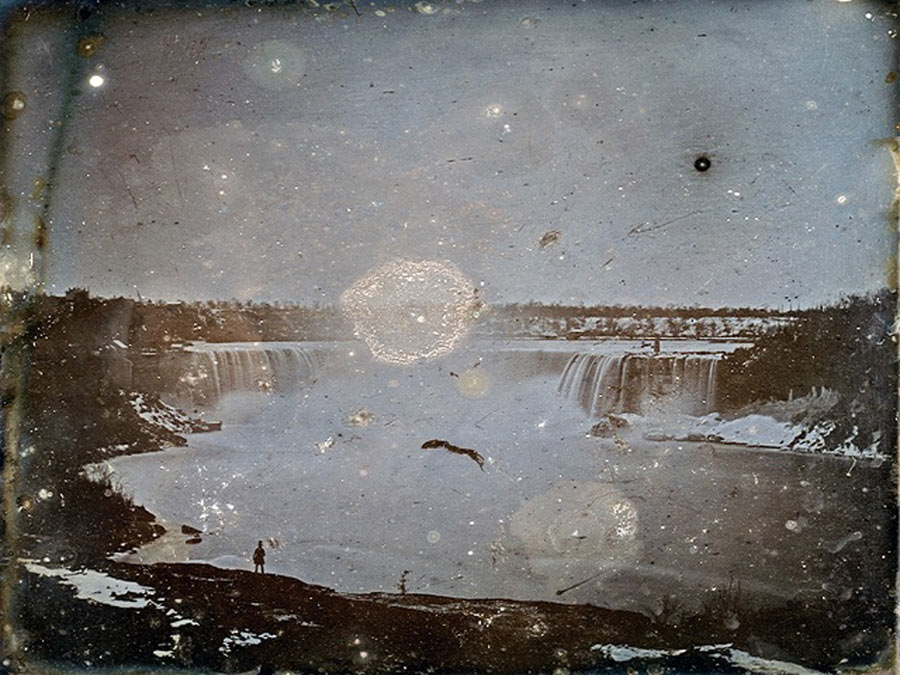
Pattinson's daguerreotype of the Niagara Falls, 1840

In about 1840, Pattinson travelled to Canada in the hope of setting up a mining business, stopping at the Niagara Falls long enough to make the earliest known photograph of the falls, a daguerreotype which survives (2009) in the collection of Newcastle University. It was once believed that the small figure standing silhouetted with a top hat was added by an engraver working from imagination as well as the daguerreotype as his source, but the figure is clearly present in the photograph. Because of the very long exposure required, of ten minutes or more, the figure is assumed by Canada's Niagara Parks agency to be Pattinson himself. The image is left-right inverted, and taken from the Canadian side. Pattinson made other photographs of the Horseshoe Falls as well as of Rome and Paris. These were then transferred to engravings to illustrate Noël Marie Paymal Lerebours' Excursions Daguerriennes (Paris, 1841–1864). Aside from being the first known photograph of the Falls, Pattinson's image is also the earliest known surviving photograph of any part of Canada, which wouldn't become a nation for another 27 years.

== Other inventions ==
In 1841 Pattinson patented two other chemical processes, one for making lead carbonate, and the other for manufacturing "magnesia alba", a white magnesium oxide. In 1849 he patented his process for making a new white lead pigment, lead oxychloride.

His lead oxychloride process became a profitable industrial reality in 1850, when Pattinson and his partners (and sons-in-law) Isaac Lowthian Bell and Robert Benson Bowman established a chemical company at Washington, County Durham. Under an 1850 Indenture, Charles William Vane, Marquis of Londonderry, Pattinson and Bell declared themselves "chemical manufacturers and co-partners in trade".

== Honours and achievements ==
In 1838 Pattinson became vice-president of the chemical section of the British Association. He was a fellow of the Geological Society and also of the Royal Astronomical Society.

Pattinson was made a Fellow of the Royal Society (FRS) on 3 June 1852 for his metallurgical work.

== Family life ==
Pattinson married Phoebe Walton on 25 December 1815, having been baptised by the vicar of Alston, Benjamin Jackson, as a member of the Church of England on 23 December 1815 in a public house, the Angel Inn at Alston, as Phoebe's family would not accept marriage to a "Quaker". He took his mother's surname Lee at the baptism.

Pattinson's three daughters married, respectively, the ironmaster Isaac Lowthian Bell, the bookseller and publisher Robert Benson Bowman, and the cable manufacturer Robert Stirling Newall. The brothers-in-law, and Pattinson himself, shared several different business partnerships. In addition, all three brothers-in-law were members of Tyneside Naturalists' Field Club and the Natural History Society of Northumberland.

He died on 11 November 1858. He was buried in Washington, County Durham churchyard. He was survived by his son, also named Hugh Lee, and three daughters. Two other sons, Walter and Thomas, died before him.

== Bibliography ==
- Garrett, G.W. (1996). "Canada's first daguerrian image". History of Photography. 20 (2): 101–103. doi:10.1080/03087298.1996.10443630.
- Lonsdale, Henry (1873). The Worthies of Cumberland, 4 (PDF). pp. 273–320. Archived from the original (PDF) on 22 April 2013.
- Howell, Georgina (2008). Gertrude Bell: Queen of the Desert, Shaper of Nations (paperback ed.). Farrar, Straus and Giroux.
- Percy, J. (1870). The Metallurgy of Lead. pp. 121–140.
- Rowe, David John (1983). History of the British Lead Manufacturing Industry, 1778–1982. Croom Helm. pp. 189–190.
- Woodward, Bernard Barham (1895). "Pattinson, Hugh Lee" . In Lee, Sidney (ed.). Dictionary of National Biography. Vol. 44. London: Smith, Elder & Co.
- Woodward, B.B. (2004). "Pattinson, Hugh Lee". Oxford Dictionary of National Biography (online ed.). Oxford University Press. doi:10.1093/ref:odnb/21582. (Subscription, Wikipedia Library access or UK public library membership required.)
