= Listed buildings in Great Smeaton =

Great Smeaton is a civil parish in the county of North Yorkshire, England. It contains eleven listed buildings that are recorded in the National Heritage List for England. All the listed buildings are designated at Grade II, the lowest of the three grades, which is applied to "buildings of national importance and special interest". The parish contains the village of Great Smeaton and the surrounding countryside. The listed buildings consist of a church, items in the churchyard, houses and associated structures, and two mileposts.

== Buildings ==
Name and location	Photograph	Date	Notes
St Eloy's Church; 54.43434°N 1.46469°W		13th century	The church has been altered and extended through the centuries, and was largely rebuilt in 1862 by G. E. Street. It is built in stone with a Welsh slate roof, and consists of a nave, a south aisle, a south porch, and a lower chancel with a north vestry. At the west end is a bellcote with arcaded sides, and a tall pyramidal roof. The porch is gabled and has an entrance with a pointed arch, a chamfered surround under a relieving arch, impost bands, stone coping, and a cross.
Table tomb southwest of the south porch 54.43428°N 1.46469°W	—	Early to mid 18th century	The table tomb in the churchyard of St Eloy's Church consists of a rectangular stone with worn lettering on six baluster-type legs.
East House; 54.43434°N 1.46375°W		Mid 18th century	The house is in red brick, with an eaves band, and a pantile roof with stone coping and shaped kneelers. The main block has two storeys and attics, on the right is a one-storey two-bay wing, to the left is a lower two-storey one-bay wing, and a further one-storey one-bay wing. In the centre is a porch with a pantile roof, the windows are sashes with stone sills and flat brick arches, and in the roof are three dormers with segmental pediments.
Table tomb south of the chancel 54.43427°N 1.46462°W	—	Mid 18th century	The table tomb in the churchyard of St Eloy's Church consists of a rectangular stone with worn lettering on six baluster-type legs. Between the legs are stone fielded panels.
Tombstone of Richard Scott; 54.43419°N 1.46479°W	—	1760	The tombstone in the churchyard of St Eloy's Church consists of a rectangular stone slab with a shaped top. Around the inscription is a cusped ogee arch, outside which is an eared egg-and-dart architrave, and within each ear is a skull and crossbones. The top forms a scrolled pediment, below which is a cherub's head with angel's wings.
Phoenix House; 54.43446°N 1.46570°W		Late 18th century	The house is in red brick, with a tile roof, stone coping and shaped kneelers. There are two storeys and two bays. The central doorway has a round-headed fanlight and a pediment, and the windows are sashes with stone sills and flat brick arches.
The Old Rectory; 54.43474°N 1.46476°W	—	Early 19th century	The house is in red brick, with dressings in stone and brick, a sill band, a floor band, a dentilled cornice, and a hipped Welsh slate roof. There are two storeys and three bays. Steps lead up to the central doorway, with Doric pilasters, a fanlight in an architrave with radial glazing bars, a frieze, a cornice and a pediment. To its right is a canted bay window with a frieze and a cornice, and the other windows are sashes with flat brick arches.
Milepost near High Enter Common Farm; 54.44481°N 1.47872°W		Late 19th century	The milepost on the west side of the A167 road is in cast iron, it has a triangular plan and a sloping top. On the top is inscribed the distance to London, on the left side is the distance to Darlington, and on the right side to Northallerton.
Milepost near St Eloy's Church; 54.43388°N 1.46434°W		Late 19th century	The milepost on the south side of the A167 road is in cast iron, it has a triangular plan and a sloping top. On the top is inscribed the distance to London, on the left side is the distance to Darlington, and on the right side to Northallerton.
Smeaton Manor; 54.43578°N 1.47871°W	—	1877–79	A small country house designed by Philip Webb, it is in red brick with a moulded cornice, overhanging eaves, and a hipped pantile roof. There are two storeys and attics, and five bays, and flanking gabled single-bay wings. The ground floor of the garden front projects slightly under a pantile roof, and the windows are sashes with mullions in segmental arches. In the upper floor are pilasters, and the attic contains three flat-headed dormers. In the centre of the north front is a porch, and a doorway with a quoined moulded stone architrave and a cornice, and the ground floor windows have cogged hood moulds.
Stables, Smeaton Manor; 54.43633°N 1.47951°W	—	1877–79	The stables, designed by Philip Webb, are in red brick with pantile roofs. In the centre is a two-storey clock tower flanked by taller chimneys. This contains a segmental carriage arch with an oversailing gabled roof. Above it is a diamond-shaped clock face, a series of pigeon holes, a roof with coping and kneelers, and a fox weathervane. The tower is flanked by single-storey wings, connecting on the left to a single-bay cottage, with a three-light window, a two-light dormer and a pyramidal roof. On the right is a stable block stretching back for eight bays.
