= St Lawrence's Church, East Rounton =

Anglican church in East Rounton, North Yorkshire, England

Coordinates: 54°25′26″N 1°21′06″W

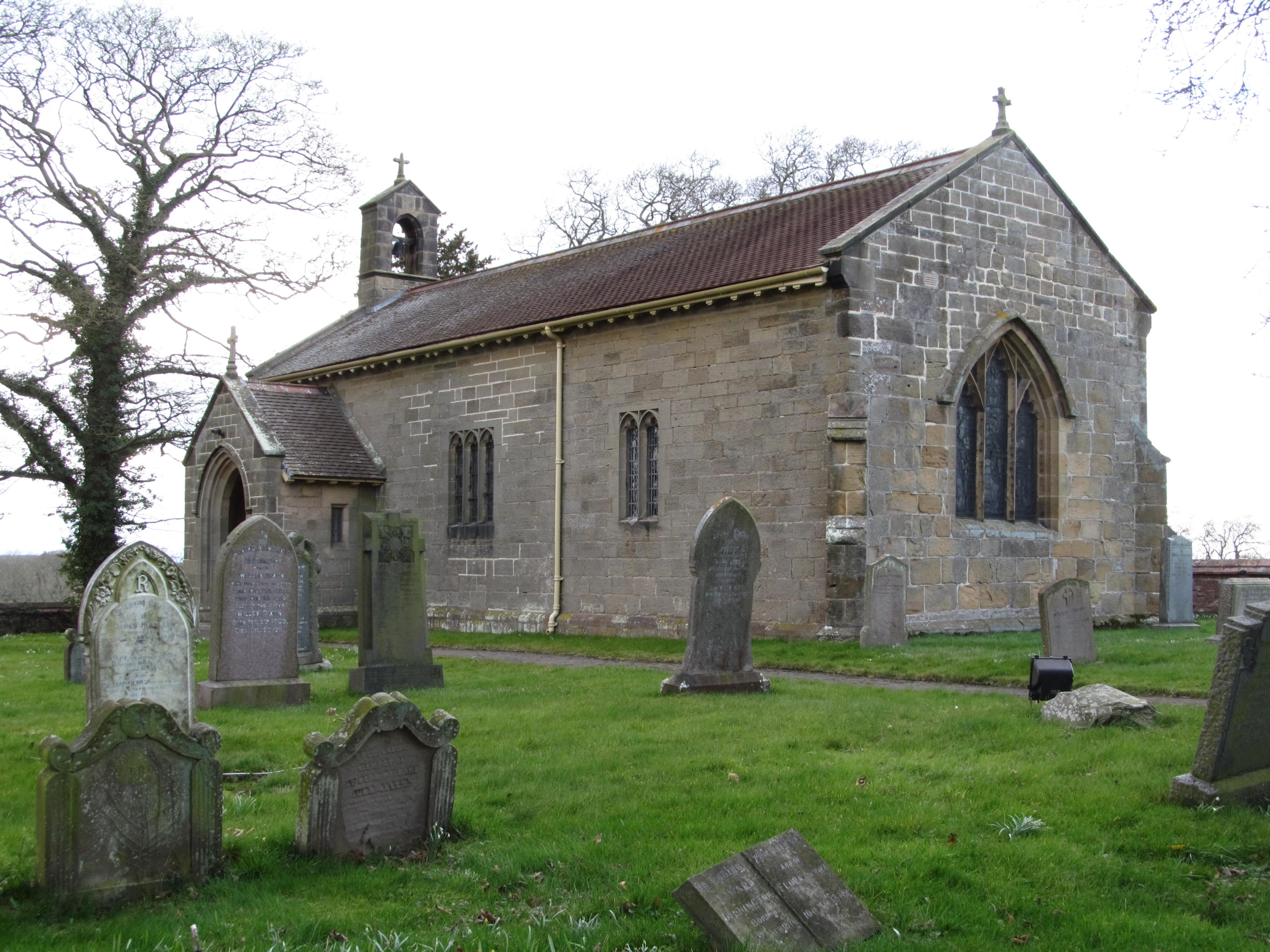
The church, in 2019

St Lawrence's Church is an Anglican church in East Rounton, a village in North Yorkshire, in England.

A church was built in the village, probably in the 15th century; it was a small stone building. In 1885, Lowthian Bell commissioned Robert James Johnson to rebuild the church. He retained only parts of the north wall, including a lancet window and doorway, and perhaps the east end of the building. Two stained glass windows were later designed by Douglas Strachan. The east window is the more conventional. The north window is a memorial to Gertrude Bell and depicts scenes relating to her life: a monk, Magdalen College, the Matterhorn, a woman in Arabic dress, the Al-Kazimiyya Mosque, and a camel train, along with Arabic text taken from a poem by Hafez. The south window is by Morris and Co. The church was grade II listed in 1966.

The church is built of sandstone with a red tile roof. It consists of an undivided nave and chancel, and a south porch. At the west end is a coped gable with a stone bellcote and a cross, and at the east end is a three-light window with a hood mould. Inside, there is an exposed timber truss roof, two aedicules in the Baroque style, believed to have been relocated from Newcastle Cathedral, and a gallery at the west end.

== See also ==
- Listed buildings in East Rounton
