= Smeaton Manor =

Manor house in Great Smeaton, North Yorkshire, England

Coordinates: 54.4358°N 1.4787°W

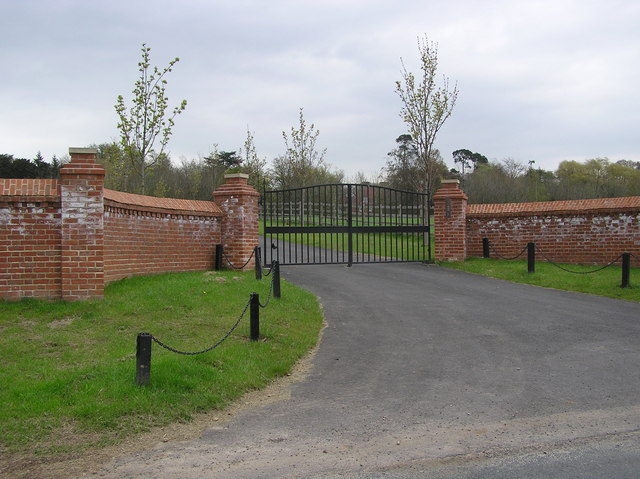
Walls and gates at the entrance to the property

Smeaton Manor is a historic building in Great Smeaton, a village in North Yorkshire, in England.

The country house was designed by Philip Webb for Arthur and Ada Fitzpatrick Godman, and constructed between 1877 and 1879. The middle of its three chimneys was later removed, and the main staircase was replaced in the 1950s. Morris & Co. decorated the house and supplied the carpets and curtains, the work since having been destroyed. The garden was laid out to a design by Webb. The house and its stables were separately grade II listed in 1953.

The house is built of red brick with a moulded cornice, overhanging eaves, and a hipped pantile roof. It has two storeys and attics, and five bays, and flanking gabled single-bay wings. The ground floor of the symmetrical garden front projects slightly under a pantile roof, and the windows are sashes with mullions in segmental arches. In the upper floor are pilasters, and the attic contains three flat-headed dormers. In the centre of the north front is the main entrance, with a porch, and a doorway with a quoined moulded stone architrave and a cornice, and the ground floor windows have cogged hood moulds.

The stables are also built of red brick, and they have pantile roofs. In the centre is a two-storey clock tower flanked by taller chimneys. This contains a segmental carriage arch with an oversailing gabled roof. Above it is a diamond-shaped clock face, a series of pigeon holes, a roof with coping and kneelers, and a fox weathervane. The tower is flanked by single-storey wings, connecting on the left to a single-bay cottage, with a three-light window, a two-light dormer and a pyramidal roof. On the right is a stable block stretching back for eight bays. Inside, the original stable boxes survive.

== See also ==
- Listed buildings in Great Smeaton
