= Little Smeaton =

Little Smeaton may refer to the following places in North Yorkshire, England

- Little Smeaton, Hambleton
- Little Smeaton, Selby
