= Rounton Grange =

Former country house in North Yorkshire, England

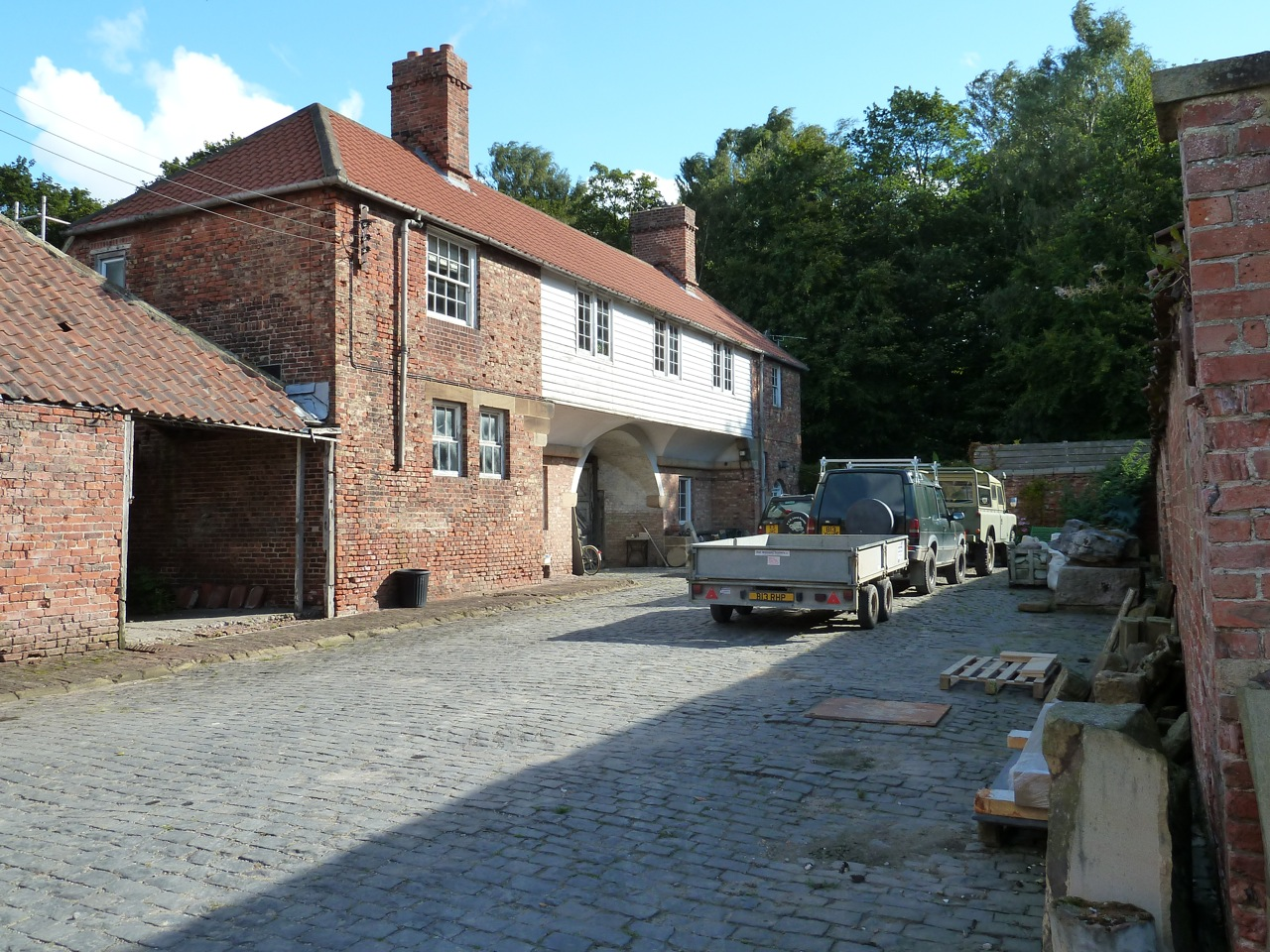
Former coach house of Rounton Grange

Rounton Grange was a country house in East Rounton, a village in North Yorkshire, in England.

== History ==
The original Rounton Grange was a substantial brick building of unknown date, and described as being of "poor quality". In 1866, it was purchased by Isaac Lowthian Bell, who originally planned to extend the house. In 1872, he decided instead to demolish the house, and commission Philip Webb to build a replacement, in the Arts and Crafts movement style. The new house was completed in 1876. The existing gardens were redesigned and extended, possibly to designs by Webb. Gertrude Bell altered the gardens in the early 20th century, her work including a rock garden constructed in 1907.

The house was designed to be tall and compact, to maximise its impact, and also preserve mature trees nearby. It was a four-storey building with attics, and towers in each corner. It was particularly noted for its interiors, including a dining room designed by William Morris and Edward Burne Jones, and a long gallery was later added to designs by George Jack.

The house proved expensive to maintain, and Bell's descendents moved out in the 1920s. During the Second World War, it was requisitioned to house evacuees, and later Italian prisoners. After the war, the family unsuccessfully tried to sell the house and to donate it to the National Trust, but it was instead demolished in 1954.

== Outbuildings ==
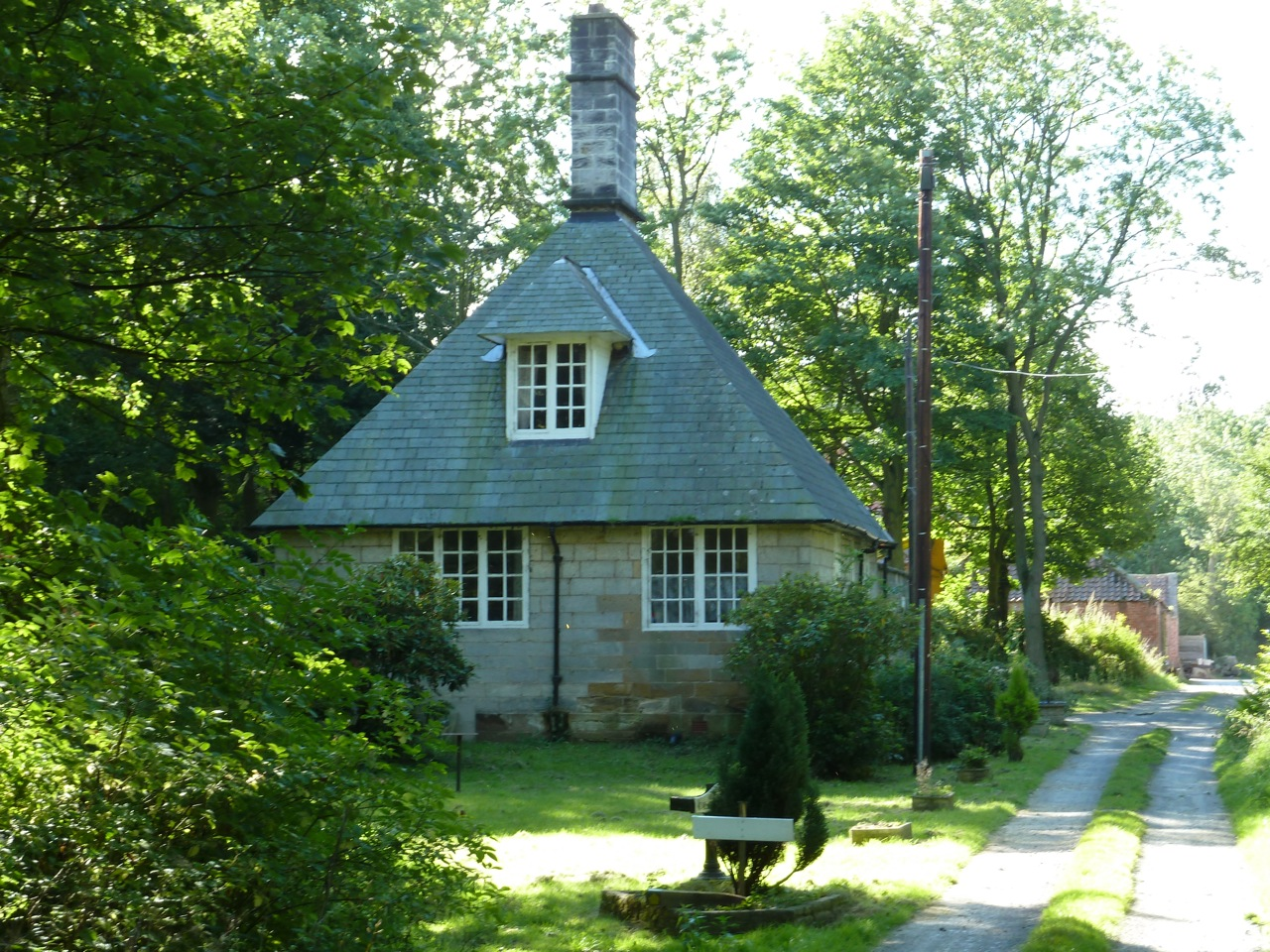
The West Lodge

While no part of the house survives, several outbuildings remain. The most notable is the former coach house, now comprising Stable Cottage, Engine House, Corner Cottage and Coachman's Cottage. Historic England describe it as "a highly innovative and imaginative design", and listed it at Grade II* in 1989. It was designed by Webb in 1875, and is built of red brick with stone dressings, weatherboarding and plaster, with pantile roofs. It forms a square plan around a covered yard. The main front has two storeys and five bays, with a wide central carriage arch on imposts. Above it is a coved jetty with weatherboarding, and the outer bays are in brick. The windows in the outer bays are sashes, and in the middle bays they are casements. The rear ranges have a single bay.

The Motor House and Fowl House was originally a further coach house, designed by Webb in 1875, in brick with angle buttresses and a pantile roof. It has two storeys, and in the west front are two stable doors and three windows above. The Motor House dates from 1905 and was designed by George Jack. It is timber framed with brick and weatherboarding, and has a pantile roof. The building contains garage doors and a mix of sash and casement windows, some in raking dormers. On the south gable end is an open platform with an ornate balustrade and French windows. On the north front is a datestone. It is a Grade II listed building.

The Grade II listed West Lodge was designed by Webb in 1875, but incorporates earlier material. It is built of stone, and has a high pyramidal green slate roof. It has a single storey and attics, and fronts of two bays. The entrance is at the rear under a pent roof, and the windows are casements, those in the attic are tall half-dormers with hipped roofs and deep eaves soffits.

The Grade II listed former gardener's cottage was designed by Jack in 1905. It is roughcast on a brick plinth, with some weatherboarding, deeply-swept eaves and a hipped pantile roof. It has two storeys and three bays, the right bay projecting and gabled, and a lean-to on the left. The doorway has a zinc hood, and the windows are casements.

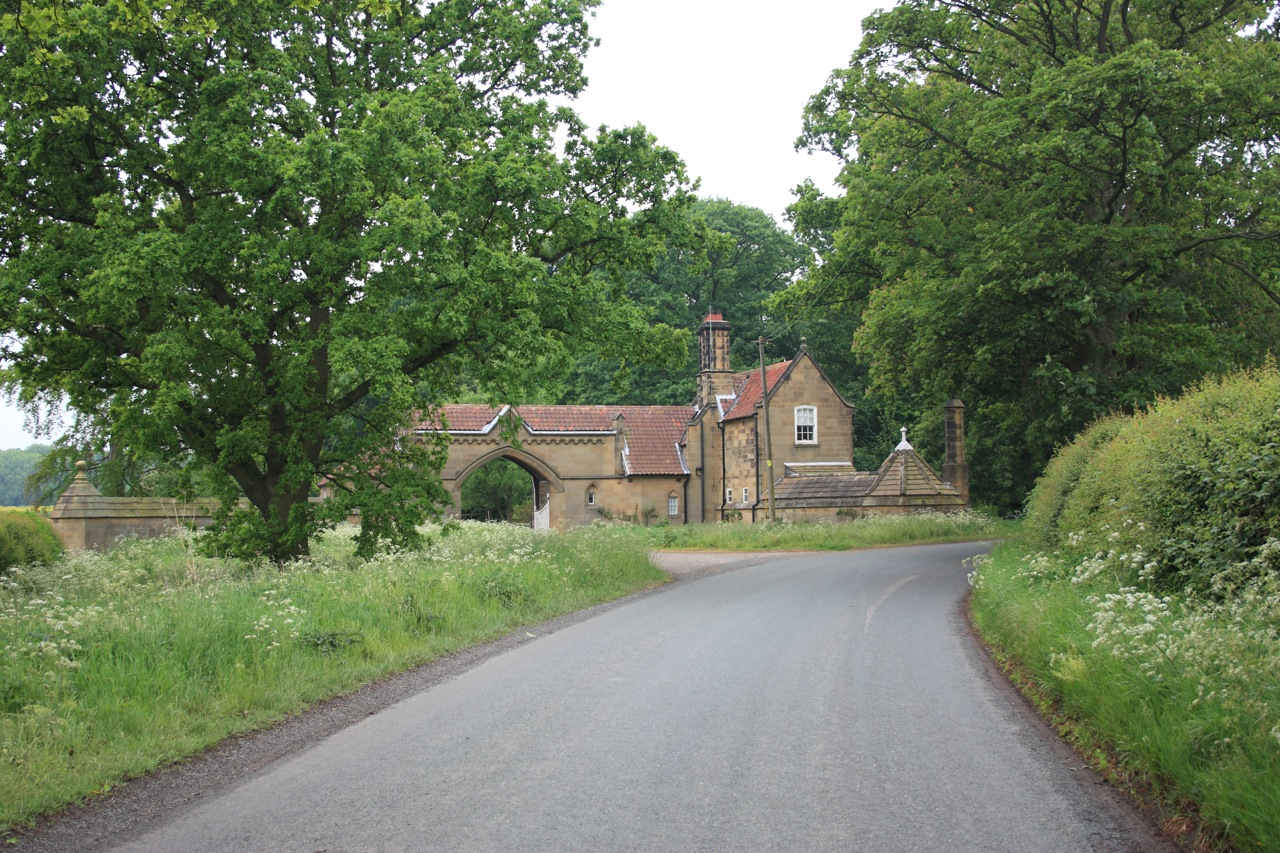
The East Lodge and gateway

Jack also designed the East Lodge, with its gateway and walls, which was completed in 1909. It is built of stone with roofs of pantile and stone flags. The lodge has two storeys, segmental-headed sash windows, and a swept roof with curved gable copings and ball finials. Over the entrance is a low arch with pseudo-machicolated eaves, and a small central gable with an escutcheon. To the left is a curved screen wall with stepped gabled coping, ending in an octagonal pier with a ball finial. To the right is a single-storey wing ending is a small octagonal pavilion. It has been a Grade II* listed building since 1966.

== See also ==
- Grade II* listed buildings in North Yorkshire (district)
- Listed buildings in East Rounton
