= Robert Benson Bowman =

English bookseller and publisher (1808–1882)

Robert Benson Bowman

Robert Benson Bowman (Richmond, Yorkshire, 14 May 1808 – 24 November 1882, Newcastle-upon-Tyne) was a Newcastle bookseller and entrepreneur. As well as publishing a range of popular books, Bowman was a business partner of the ironmaster Lowthian Bell and an amateur botanist.

== Biography ==
Bowman was the youngest of seven children of Thomas Bowman of the small Yorkshire town of Richmond. Thomas was a printer and bookseller, having tried his hand at different ways of earning money including selling patent medicines and perfumes, and working at various times as a clerk to the Commissioners of Taxes and as a magistrates' clerk.

Bowman was educated at Richmond School under the famous headmaster James Tate.

In his teens Bowman helped to form the Richmond Botanical Society. He was a keen amateur botanist all his life, and a long time member of the Natural History Society of Northumberland. He corresponded with and became a friend of the famous Scottish botanist William Jackson Hooker (British Flora), and with other botanists including Hewett Cottrell Watson (Topographical Botany), to whom he sent plant specimens and scientific observations which they used in their books. He similarly corresponded and sent specimens to the marine biologist George Johnston at Berwick-upon-Tweed.

In 1824, aged 16, he moved to Newcastle and began to work as a druggist at Robert Currie's shop at 19 Sandhill. In 1834, he set up in business as a bookseller, like his father, in partnership with Currie, buying the established bookshop at 32 Collingwood Street. They sold books on art, natural history, theology and general subjects, branching out into publishing, and also acting as a depot for the Society for Promoting Christian Knowledge.

Bowman published a variety of books locally at 12 Nuns' Lane, Newcastle, including the Victorian chapbook "Life of Jack Sheppard, the Notorious House and Gaol Breaker", twenty-three "Penny Histories" and nineteen "Penny Song Books".

Bowman married Ellen Pattinson, daughter of the industrial chemist Hugh Lee Pattinson and Phoebe Walton. Her sisters married Bowman's business partner Isaac Lowthian Bell, and another of Bell's business partners, Robert Stirling Newall: all three brothers-in-law were members of Tyneside Naturalists' Field Club and the Natural History Society of Northumberland. Bowman, Pattinson and Bell set up in business in 1850 as "chemical manufacturers and co-partners in trade", founding the chemical works at Washington, County Durham.

His body is buried in the Pattinson family vault in Washington, County Durham.

== Bibliography ==
- Hendra, Leslie Anne (2005). "Robert Benson Bowman - an early Newcastle botanist" (PDF). 64. Natural History Society of Northumberland: 161–168. Archived from the original (PDF) on 6 September 2014.
