= Listed buildings in Hornby, North Yorkshire =

Hornby is a civil parish in the county of North Yorkshire, England. It contains three listed buildings that are recorded in the National Heritage List for England. All the listed buildings are designated at Grade II, the lowest of the three grades, which is applied to "buildings of national importance and special interest". The parish contains the village of Hornby and the surrounding countryside, and the listed buildings consist of a house and two associated buildings.

== Buildings ==
Name and location	Photograph	Date	Notes
Hornby Grange; 54.43170°N 1.44264°W		1767	The house is in red brick on a stone plinth, with dressings in brick and stone, a sill band, a floor band, a stone modillion cornice, and a hipped slate roof. There are two storeys, eight bays, and two small square rear wings. In the centre, steps lead up to a porch with Roman Doric pilasters and columns, a frieze, a cornice, and a triangular pediment. This flanked by full-height canted bay windows containing French windows. The other windows are sashes with flat brick arches, and at the rear is an arched stair window.
Pavilion southwest of Hornby Grange; 54.43127°N 1.44350°W	—	c. 1767	The pavilion with a stable is in red brick, with a dentilled eaves band, and a pyramidal tile roof with a finial. There is one storey, a square plan, and fronts each of one bay. On each side is a large semicircular-headed blind arch with voussoirs and impost in red brick, with a dentilled eaves band, and on the south side is a stable door with a fanlight.
Stables north of Hornby Grange; 54.43210°N 1.44274°W	—	1767	The stable block is in red brick, with a dentilled eaves band, and a hipped stone slate roof. There are two storeys and eight bays, the middle two bays projecting under a dentilled pediment. In each of these bays is a large carriage door under semicircular radial panelling and a brick arch with a stepped impost band. Elsewhere, there are two more carriage arches, two doorways with fanlights, and a mix of casement and horizontally-sliding sash windows.
