= Lowthian Bell =

19th-century industrial chemist, ironmaster, and politician

Sir Lowthian Bell Bt, FRS
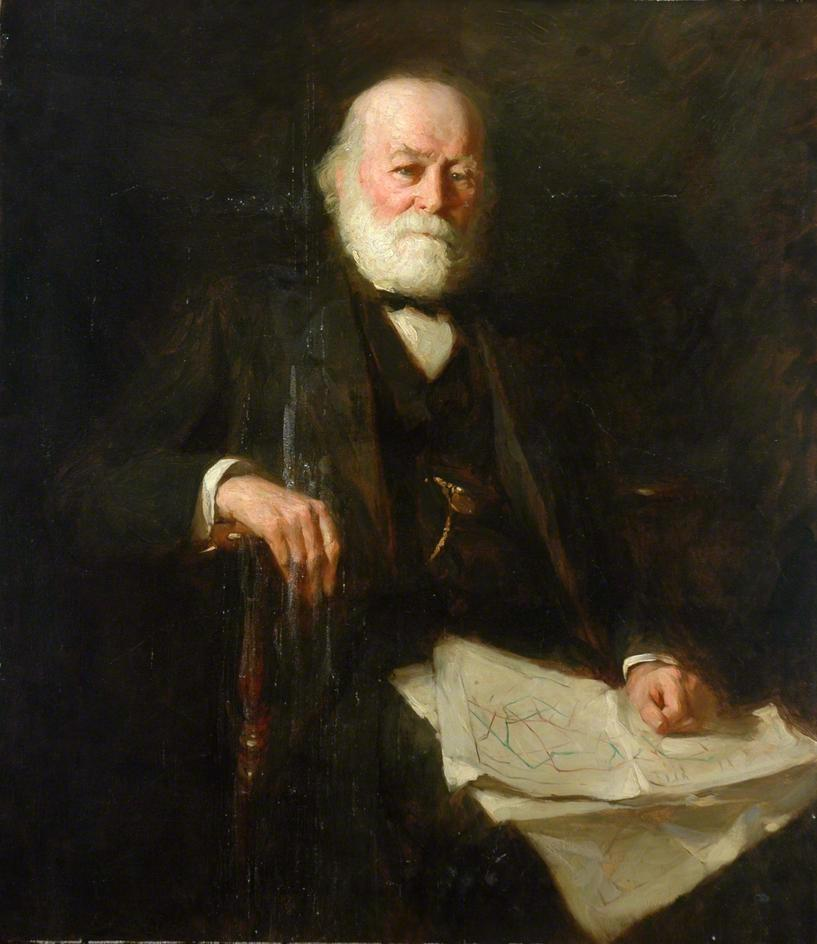
- Sir Isaac Lowthian Bell, by Frank Bramley. National Railway Museum, York
- Born: 18 February 1816; Newcastle upon Tyne, England
- Died: 20 December 1904 (aged 88); London, England
- Occupations: Ironmaster, Company Director
- Known for: Ironmaking, metallurgy, industrial chemistry Member of Parliament
- Awards: Bessemer Gold Medal (1874); Albert Medal (1895)

Sir Isaac Lowthian Bell, 1st Baronet, FRS (18 February 1816 – 20 December 1904) was a British ironmaster and Liberal Party politician from Washington, County Durham. He was described as being "as famous in his day as Isambard Kingdom Brunel".

Bell was an energetic and skilful entrepreneur as well as an innovative metallurgist. He was involved in multiple partnerships with his brothers to make iron and alkali chemicals, and with other pioneers including Robert Stirling Newall to make steel cables. He pioneered the large-scale manufacture of aluminium at his Washington works, conducting experiments in its production, and in the production of other chemicals such as the newly discovered element thallium. He was a director of major companies including the North Eastern Railway and the Forth Bridge company, then the largest bridge project in the world.

He was a wealthy patron of the arts, commissioning the architect Philip Webb, the designer William Morris and the painter Edward Burne-Jones on his Yorkshire mansions Rounton Grange and Mount Grace Priory.

== Early life ==
Bell was the son of Thomas Bell, one of the founders of the iron and alkali company Losh, Wilson and Bell, and his wife Katherine Lowthian. He was born in Newcastle-upon-Tyne and educated at Dr Bruce's academy in Percy Street, Newcastle, followed by studying physical science at Edinburgh University and the Sorbonne University, Paris. He gained experience in manufacturing alkalis at Marseille before returning to Newcastle in 1836 to work in his father's Walker iron and chemical works.

== Industry ==
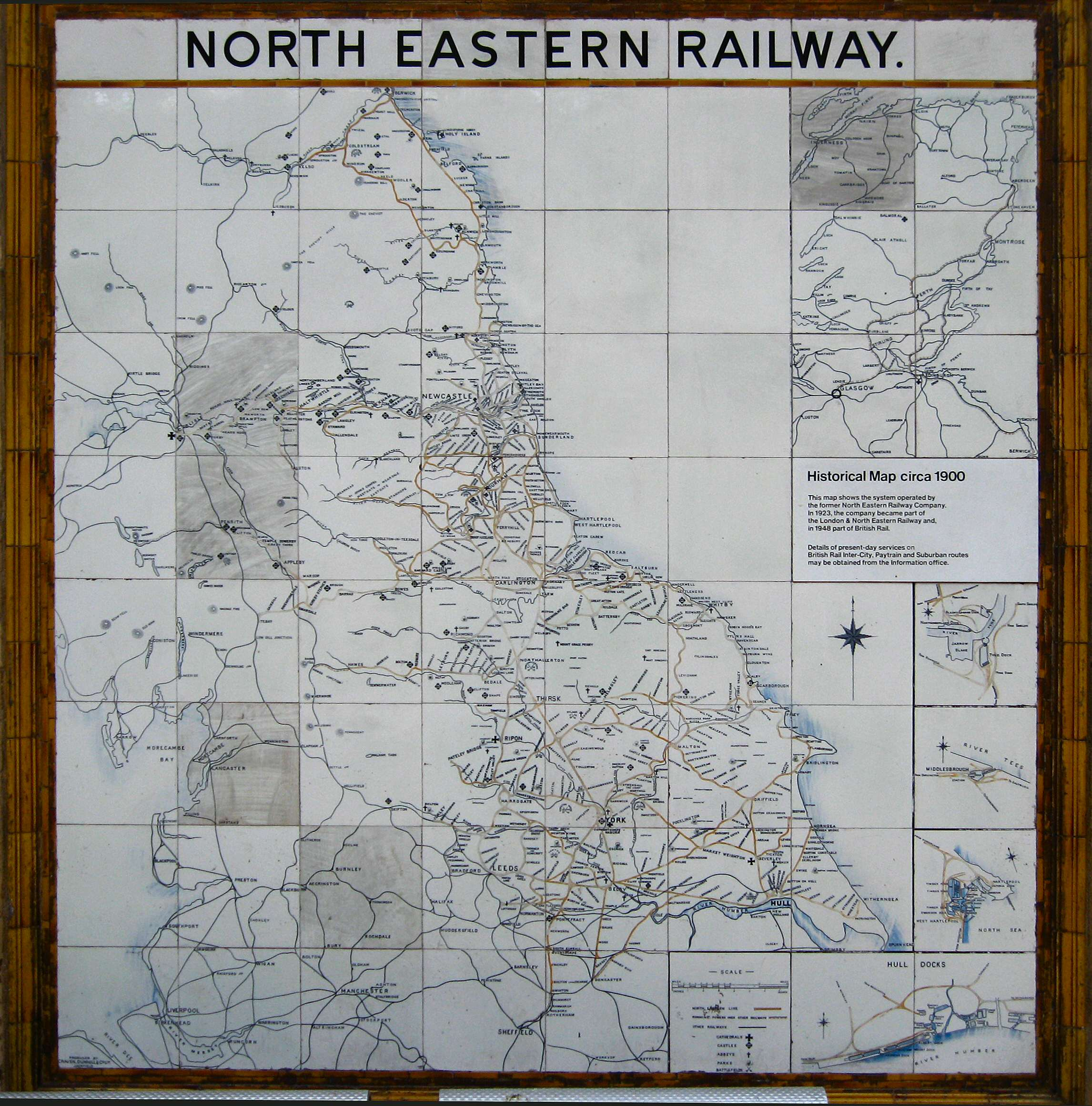
Bell was a director of the North Eastern Railway.

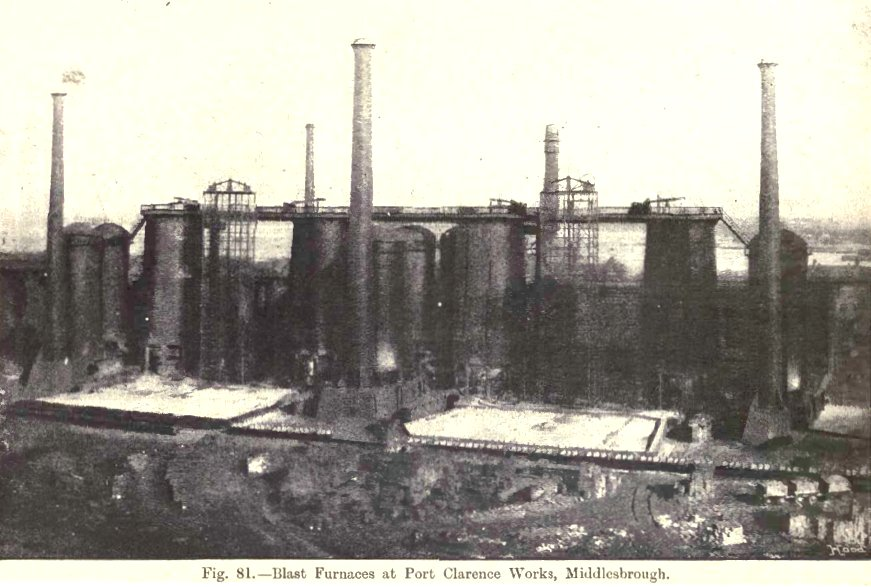
Blast furnaces at Bell Brothers' Port Clarence Ironworks, Middlesbrough, 1917

Bell's industrial life was complex: involvement in up to three different partnerships at the same time created a conflict of loyalties, causing allegiances to each to vary over the years. Inspired to become an entrepreneur he took over the Walker ironworks on his father's death in 1845. In 1850 at Washington, County Durham, Bell made a breakthrough discovering a new process for manufacturing lead oxychloride. His partners and co-founders of the Washington chemical company, named after his home, were his brother-in-law Robert Benson Bowman and his father-in-law Hugh Lee Pattinson. Pattinson was the inventor responsible for the process separating silver from lead that bears his name. Under an 1850 Indenture, Charles Vane, 3rd Marquess of Londonderry, Pattinson and Bell declared themselves "chemical manufacturers and co-partners in trade". Bell decided the partnership might be incompatible with his continued involvement in the running of Losh, Wilson and Bell. In September 1849 he wrote to Losh and Wilson informing them that the partnership with Pattinson "would necessitate my relinquishing the office I at present hold in your firm".

Establishing a partnership with Robert Stirling Newall in 1850, Bell set up the first factory in the world with machines able to manufacture steel rope and submarine cable. Two years later his brothers Thomas Bell and John Bell joined him to build a major iron works at Port Clarence, Middlesbrough on the north bank of the River Tees. By 1853 there were three blast furnaces, each with a capacity of just over 6,000 cubic feet (170 cubic metres), making them the largest in Britain at the time. The works produced iron for bridges and steel rails for railways across the British Empire including the North Eastern Railway company, of which Bell was a director from 1864 onwards, and deputy chairman from 1895 until his death. The Bell brothers' company operated its own ironstone mines at Normanby and Cleveland, and its own limestone quarries in Weardale, employing about 6000 men in mining and manufacturing. By 1878 the firm was producing 200,000 tons of iron per annum. Bell was a professional metallurgist and industrial chemist, constantly pioneering processes such as the recycling of heat from escaping flue gases, and trialling many process improvements.

In 1859 Bell opened Britain's first factory able to manufacture aluminium, a metal which had been as costly as gold because of the difficulty of chemically reducing the metal from an oxide. On the day it opened at Washington, Bell toured Newcastle in his carriage, saluting the crowds with an aluminium top hat. The plant used the new Deville sodium process. he described how critical it was to make aluminium pure in The Technologist:

Now, it happens, that the presence of foreign matters, in a degree so small as almost to be infinitesimal, interferes so largely with the colour, as well as with the malleability of the aluminium, that the use of any substance containing them is of a fatal character. Nor is this all, for the nature of that compound which hitherto has constituted the most important application of this metal — aluminium-bronze — is so completely changed by using aluminium containing the impurities referred to [silica, iron, or phosphorus] that it ceases to possess any of those properties which render it valuable.

— Isaac Lowthian Bell

In 1863, Bell exhibited "several pounds" of the recently discovered element thallium when the British Association met in Newcastle that autumn. The metal was obtained from the flue deposits (mainly lead sulphate) from the manufacture of sulphuric acid from pyrites, one of the products of the Washington works. All the credit was given to researcher Henri Brivet, who was "chief" of the laboratories at Washington, having experienced "languor and headache" then known to be caused by breathing thallium fumes.

The Cleveland ironstone had been considered inferior for steelmaking, as it contained a relatively high percentage of phosphorus at 1.8 to 2.0%, weakening the resulting iron. Bell directed large-scale experiments at a cost of up to £50,000, resulting in a basic steel process which produced steel rails containing no more than 0.07% phosphorus. His obituary in The Times of 1904 noted, as a sign of the progress that Bell himself had brought about, that Bell could recall "seeing wooden rails in use on the tramroads by which coal was brought down to the River Tees".

In 1867 and 1868, Bell gave papers on the state of the manufacture of iron and that of foreign competitors, in particular France, Belgium and Germany. Britain's great strength lay in its "incomparable fields of coal which constitute so important a feature in our mineral wealth". He stated that although the price and quality of coal were better in Britain, the cost of labour could be as much as 20–25% lower, particularly in Germany. In 1882, Bell successfully drilled for salt at Port Clarence, finding an exploitable salt bed at a depth of 1,200 feet (370 metres). He used the salt for making soda, but the borehole was sold to the Salt Union in 1888.

In 1875, Bell began to move out of working in industry by retiring from his partnership with Robert Benson Bowman and Robert Stirling Newall, leaving the two of them to continue to run the chemical works until 1878, when Newall bought out Bowman. He continued to own shares in Bell companies and the North Eastern Railway. In 1901, at age 85, after a long period of difficulty for heavy industry and with fears of worse to come as manufacturing grew in Germany, America and Japan, he made a decisive move to guard the family's wealth. He sold his railway interests to the North Eastern Railway company, and the sale of a majority holding in his manufacturing companies to rival Dorman Long was completed in 1903. From the fortune thus released, he gave £5,000 to each of his many nephews, nieces and grandchildren.

== Politics ==
For 30 years from 1850, Bell was active on the town council of Newcastle upon Tyne. He became sheriff of the town in 1851, mayor in 1854 and alderman in 1859. Once again he was elected mayor for Newcastle in 1862.

Bell was elected as the Member of Parliament for North Durham from February to June 1874, and for The Hartlepools from 1875 to 1880. He lost his seat in North Durham in 1874 on the grounds that his agents were guilty of intimidation.

== Honours, awards and achievements ==
Bell founded the Iron and Steel Institute and was its president from 1873 to 1875. In 1874 he became the first recipient of the gold medal instituted by Sir Henry Bessemer. Bell became a Fellow of the Royal Society in 1874 for his distinction in chemistry and metallurgy, especially of iron.

An international figure with a scientific profile, he was invited to serve as a juror at International Exhibitions in Philadelphia in 1876, and again in Paris in 1878. He was accordingly made an honorary member of the American Philosophical Institution and an officer of the Legion d'Honneur. In 1877 he founded the Institute of Chemistry of Great Britain (later the Royal Institute of Chemistry). being nominated a fellow of the Chemical Society of London, and president of the Society of Chemical Industry from 1889-90.

During the 1881 Census, taken on 3 April, Bell was recorded as a visitor at his daughter Maisie's house. Her husband the Hon. Edward L. Stanley, M.P. in Harley Street, London was the Head of the Household, recording Bell's occupation as "Magistrate, Deputy Lieutenant, Iron Master". In 1882 he became a director of the Forth Bridge company. At that time this was the world's largest bridge project. Bell became president of the Institution of Mechanical Engineers in 1884 and was made a baronet in 1885. With an inherited title he adopted the motto Perseverantia (perseverance) and the arms "Argent on a Fess between three Hawk's Lures Azure as many Hawk's Bells of the first".

In 1886 Bell became the 10th president of the North of England Institute of Mining and Mechanical Engineers. He was awarded the George Stephenson Medal from the Institution of Civil Engineers in 1890, and the Telford Medal (then called the Telford Premium) from the same institution, both for papers that he presented there. In 1895 Bell was awarded the Albert Medal of the Royal Society of Arts, in recognition of the services he has rendered to Arts, Manufactures and Commerce, by his metallurgical researches and the resulting development of the iron and steel industries.

== Works ==
Bell wrote many papers on chemistry and metallurgy. In his Iron Trade, he correctly predicted the outstripping of Britain by Germany in industrial production, unsuccessfully urging government action to avoid this. His major works include:

- The Manufacture of Iron in connection with the Northumberland and Durham Coalfields, The Industrial resources of the District the three northern rivers, the Tyne, Wear and Tees: including the reports on the local manufactures, read before the British Association.
- On the Manufacture of Aluminium, The Industrial resources of the District the three northern rivers, the Tyne, Wear and Tees: including the reports on the local manufactures, read before the British Association. (pp 73–119) Baron William George Armstrong, 1863.
- The Manufacture of Aluminium, The Technologist, July 1864.
- The Manufacture of Thallium, British Association, 1864.
- The present state of the manufacture of iron in Great Britain, and its position as compared with that of some other countries (from the report of the British Association for the Advancement of Science 1867), M & M.W. Lambert, Newcastle upon Tyne, 1867.
- The Chemical Phenomena of Iron Smelting: An Experimental and Practical Examination of the Circumstances Which Determine the Capacity of the Blast Furnace, the Temperature of the Air, and the Proper Condition of the Materials to Be Operated Upon (collection of papers published as a book, 435pp), Routledge, London, 1872.
- The Iron Trade of the United Kingdom Compared with that of the Other Chief Ironmaking Nations, Literary and Philosophical Society, Newcastle-upon-Tyne, 1875.
- Mr I Lowthian Bell and the Blair Direct Process. James M'Millin, 1875.
- Sir Lowthian Bell and his presidential address. North of England Institute of Mining and Mechanical Engineers (vol. 36) 1875.
- On the Hot Blast, with an explanation of its Mode of Action in Iron Furnaces of Different Capacities. Transactions of the American Institute of Mining Engineers (vol. V pp 56–81) May 1876 to February 1877.
- The Principles of the Manufacture of Iron and Steel with some notes on the economic conditions of their production , George Routledge & Sons, London, 1884.
- On the manufacture of salt near Middlesbrough (with James Forrest). Institution of Civil Engineers, London, 1887.
- On the Probable Future of the Manufacture of Iron.
- Memorandum as to the wear of rails, Ben Johnson, 1896.
- Memorandum(No.2) as to the wear of rails & broken rails, Leeds Chorley & Pickersgill 1900.

== Family life ==
On 20 July 1842 Bell, known as Lowthian, married Margaret Pattinson, daughter of his business partner Hugh Lee Pattinson and Phebe Walton. Margaret's younger sisters married Bell's business partners Robert Benson Bowman and Robert Stirling Newall: all three brothers-in-law were members of Tyneside Naturalists' Field Club and the Natural History Society of Northumberland.

Their children were Sir Thomas Hugh Bell, 2nd Baronet, known as Hugh, who was father of the explorer and diplomat Gertrude Bell, Florence, Mary Katherine, known as Maisie, who in 1873 married Edward Stanley, 4th Baron Stanley of Alderley, Ada, Charles, and Ellen (who died in infancy). He had about 60 grandchildren.

In 1854, he built Washington New Hall, a few miles south of Newcastle-upon-Tyne. In 1872 an illegally young chimney sweep, aged 7, died in a chimney in the Hall. Bell promptly moved into the newly built Rounton Grange near Northallerton, leaving Washington Hall empty for nineteen years until he donated it as a home for poor children, named at his request "Dame Margaret's Hall". According to his granddaughter's biographer Georgina Howell, he was "a formidable giant of a man" and somewhat abrasive. The family prepared a Christmas alphabet in 1877 at Rounton Grange, including "C is the Crushing Contemptuous Pater", which Bell's daughter Elsa later annotated "Sir Isaac Lowthian Bell". In Howell's view, another event also hinted at Bell's character: one cold winter's night, his coachman was found, according to some papers found in Mount Grace Priory, "frozen stiff on the box-seat of his carriage". Howell notes that the coachman could simply have had a heart attack, and not have died of exposure at all, but still, in her view "consideration for others was not, perhaps, Lowthian's principal quality".

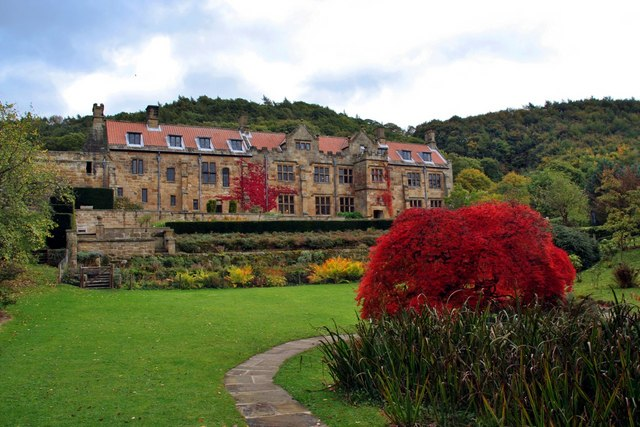
The converted manor house at Mount Grace Priory, in 2008

Rounton Grange was finished in 1876, under the architect Philip Webb; it was at that time his largest project. The house was five storeys high, of yellow brick with a pantiled roof, enormous mock mediaeval chimneys and "gothic" features. It was set in an estate of 3000 acres with lawns, a wood full of daffodils, a rose garden, and two lakes. Inside was an immense arched gallery that stretched the full width of the house, a wide curved staircase and baronial fireplace. In the main drawing room there was an Adamesque fireplace, and two grand pianos on a vast carpet. There was a large tapestry frieze of Chaucer's Romaunt of the Rose designed by William Morris and Edward Burne-Jones, and made by Lady Bell and her daughters over several years. While decorating the great house, Morris spoke of "ministering to the swinish luxury of the rich".

Given his huge wealth, Margaret and he lived relatively simply, preferring the relatively humble Arts and Crafts style for his three-year refurbishment of the medieval Mount Grace Priory near Osmotherley, which was in serious disrepair when he purchased it in 1898 as a weekend retreat. The house was decorated by the best designers of the day in the "Aesthetic" style, with William Morris's "Double Bough" wallpaper hand-printed using 22 apple wood printing blocks. For the restoration of 2010 the original blocks were used to produce a close replica of the original wallpaper, each roll taking a week to print by hand.

Bell died on 20 December 1904 at his house in London, 10 Belgrave Terrace. He left £750,000 to his son Hugh Bell on his death in 1904.

== Legacy ==
After his death, the Institution of Mining Engineers resolved that

It is impossible to estimate the value of the services that Sir Lowthian Bell rendered to the Institution of Mining Engineers in promoting its objects, and in devoting his time and energies to the advancement of the Institution.

— Council of the Institution of Mining Engineers

Gertrude Bell's biographer, Georgina Howell, writes of Lowthian Bell that through his writings such as The Chemical Phenomena of Iron Smelting he was seen as the "high priest of British Metallurgy". She observes that he was noted also for his wealth and for the innovations he made, such as the use of steel-making slag as phosphate fertilizer, (Note: Cleveland Ironstone was high in Phosphorus.) and that he was arguably Britain's "foremost industrialist". Among his friends were famous Victorians such as Charles Darwin, Thomas Huxley, William Morris and John Ruskin. However, Howell writes, "Lowthian was admired rather than loved, and appears to have been dictatorial and harsh towards his family." She observes that "There is to this day no biography of the man who was as famous in his day as Isambard Kingdom Brunel."

== Bibliography ==
- Anon (1907). "Obituary Notices of Fellows Deceased". Proceedings of the Royal Society of London. LXXVIII: xiv–xviii.
- Anon (1906–1907). "Memoir of Sir Lowthian Bell, Bart". Transactions of the Institution of Mining Engineers. XXXIII: 665–672.
- Cooper, Thompson (1884). "Bell, Isaac Lowthian" . Men of the Time (eleventh ed.). London: George Routledge & Sons. p. 97.
- Howell, Georgina (2008). Gertrude Bell: Queen of the Desert, Shaper of Nations (paperback ed.). Farrar, Straus and Giroux. ISBN 9780374531355.
- Macfarlane, Walter (1917). The Principles and Practice of Iron and Steel Manufacture. London: Longmans, Green. OL 7131814M.
- Tomlinson, W. W. (1915). The North Eastern Railway: its Rise and Development. Newcastle-upon-Tyne: Andrew Reid and Company.
- Tweedale, Geoffrey (2011). "Oxford Dictionary of National Biography". Oxford Dictionary of National Biography (online ed.). Oxford University Press. doi:10.1093/ref:odnb/30690. (Subscription, Wikipedia Library access or UK public library membership required.)
- Nordisk familjebok 2. Armatoler – Bergsund. Uggleupplagan. 1904. pp. 1267–1268.
- "Memoir: Sir Isaac Lowthian Bell, Bart.' Proceedings - Institution of Mechanical Engineers 1904, 1354-1356
- "Obituary: Sir Lowthian Bell, Bart." Journal - Iron and Steel Institute 66 1904, 426-434
- "Obituary, Sir Isaac Lowthian Bell, Bart, LLD, 1816–1904". Minutes of the Proceedings of the Institution of Civil Engineers. 160 (1905): 386–388. 1 January 1905. doi:10.1680/imotp.1905.16903. ISSN 1753-7843.
- North Yorkshire County Council Archives: Bell of Rounton Grange Records
- Archaeo-Environment: Washington Chemical Works. March 2004. Report 29/1-03 for Sunderland City Council.

Parliament of the United Kingdom
Preceded by Charles Palmer and Sir George Elliot	Member of Parliament for North Durham; Feb. 1874–Jun. 1874; With: Charles Palmer	Succeeded by Charles Palmer and Sir George Elliot
Preceded by Thomas Richardson	Member of Parliament for The Hartlepools; 1875–1880	Succeeded by Thomas Richardson
Baronetage of the United Kingdom
New creation	Baronet (of Rounton Range and Washington Hall); 1885–1904	Succeeded by (Thomas) Hugh Bell
Professional and academic associations
Preceded by Percy G. B. Westmacott	President of the Institution of Mechanical Engineers; 1884	Succeeded by Jeremiah Head
Preceded by John Daglish	President of the North of England Institute of Mining and Mechanical Engineers; 1886–1888	Succeeded by John Marley
