= 1 Palace Green =

House on Palace Green, Kensington, London

Coordinates: 51°30′10″N 0°11′22″W

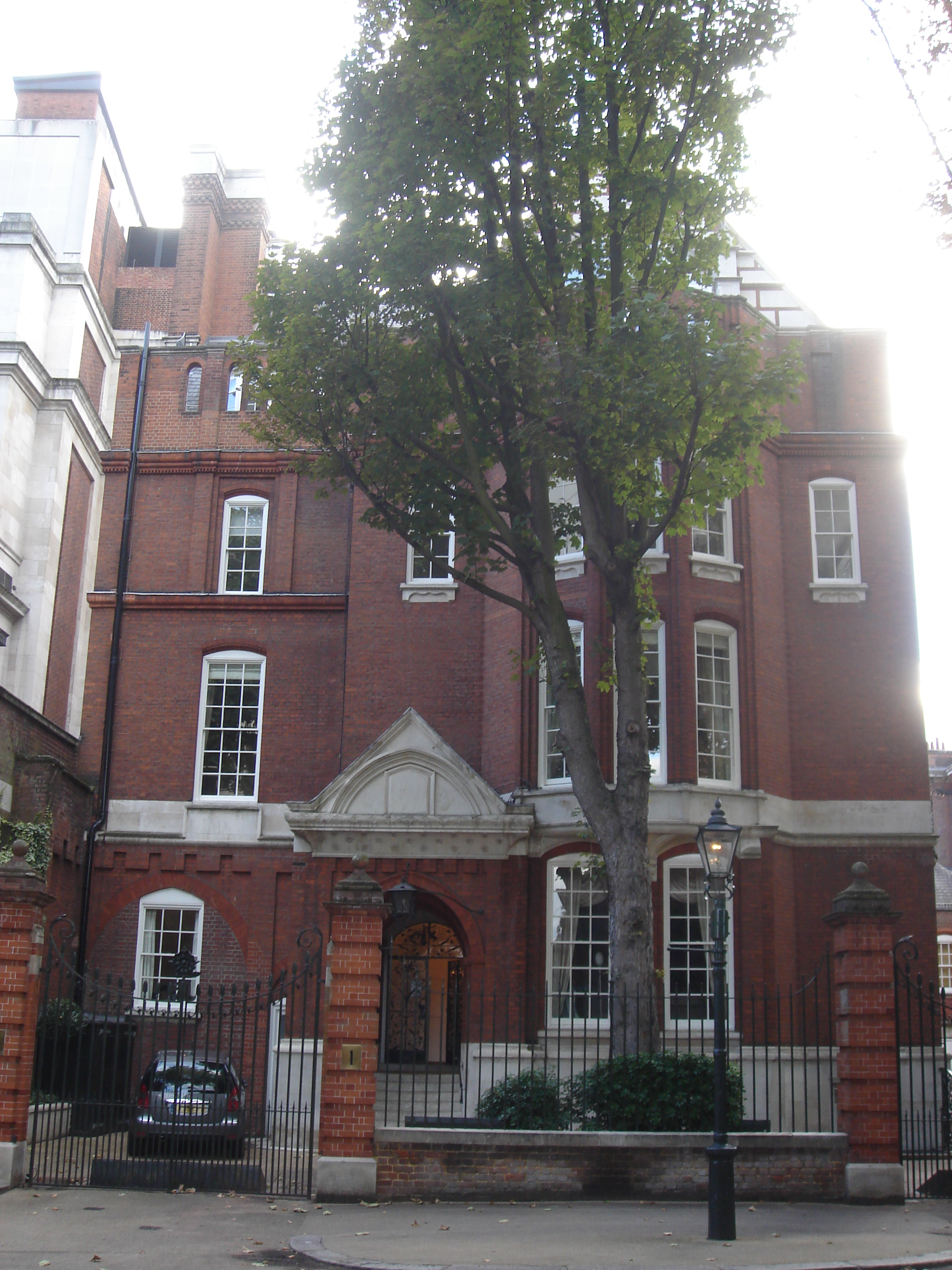
1 Palace Green, east front with porch and bay window

1 Palace Green is a Grade II* listed house on Palace Green, Kensington, London, England. It was built by Arts and Crafts architect Philip Webb, completed in 1870 with additions in 1874, and decorated by Morris, Marshall, Faulkner & Company.

== Construction ==
Webb designed the house over 1867–68 as a studio house for George Howard, a painter and the future 9th Earl of Carlisle, and his wife Rosalind Howard. The couple were associated with the Holland Park Circle of artists, and close friends of the artist Edward Burne-Jones.

Webb saw his design as a return to London building traditions. His use of plain red brick, sash windows and a large gable on the street front provoked opposition from James Pennethorne, the surveyor for the Commissioners of Woods, Forests and Land Revenues, whose approval was needed as the site was leased from the Crown Estate. Pennethorne could not understand the Arts and Crafts architect's nonconformance to any traditional style or period of architecture, and thought the design vulgar compared to those of neighbouring developments, which Webb in turn despised. After a long dispute which grew to include other prominent architects, Webb agreed to add some more Portland stone dressings and redesign the gable. The house was constructed over 1868–70.

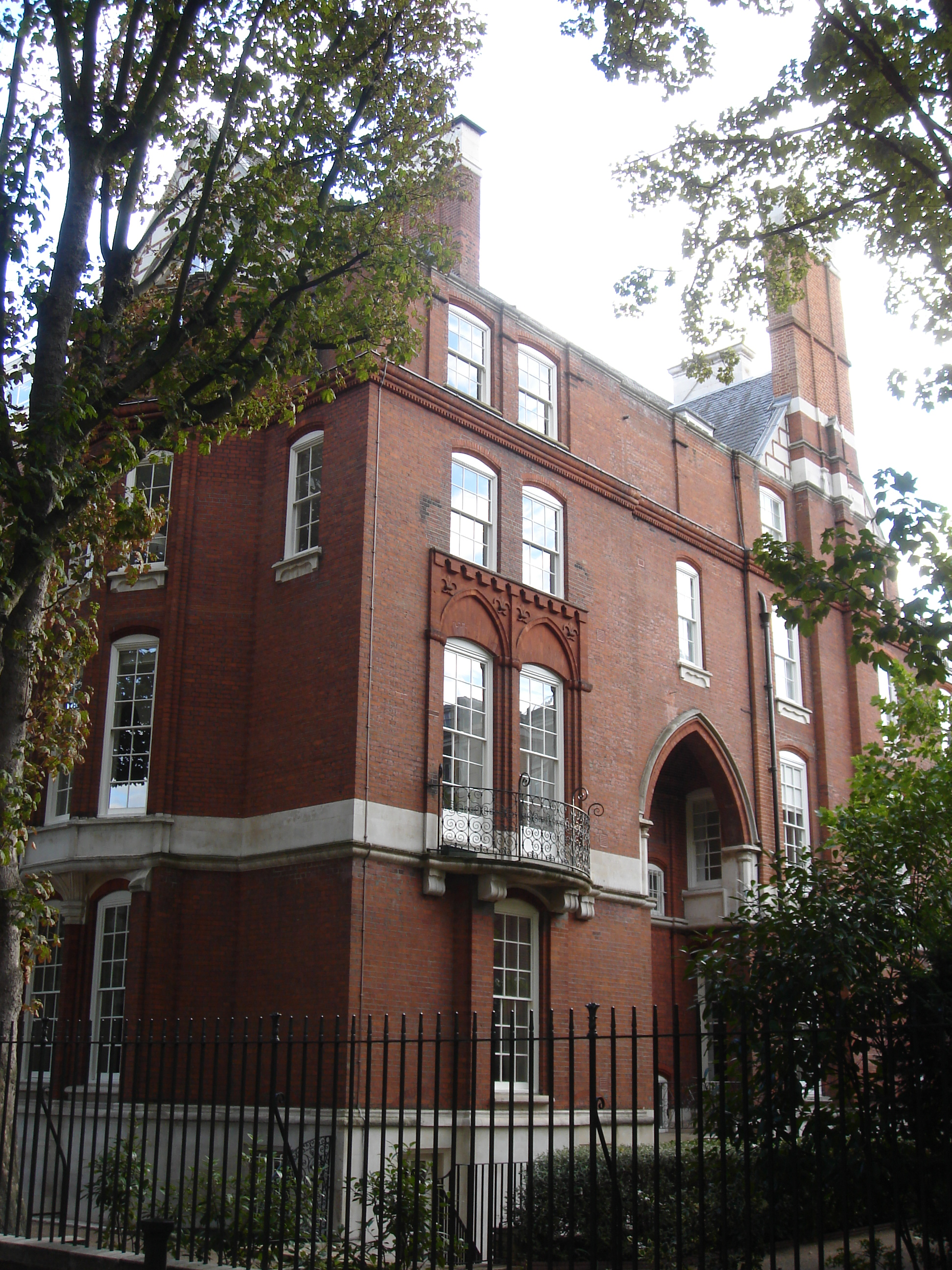
The north side, showing the arched recess below the studio

The L-plan house was tall compared to the neighbouring properties, having a kitchen basement level and three residential levels, with gables above. On the front elevation there is a two-storey bay window, projecting over the ground storey, surmounted by a parapet and the large, stone-faced gable. The porch incorporates a pointed arch. Webb positioned Howard's studio on the north side of the top residential storey, with its own staircase which led down to the garden, opening into a two-storey pointed-arch recess. In 1873–74 Webb returned to add a schoolroom next to the studio, over another tall pointed-arch recess, in the south elevation.

== Furnishings and art ==
The house was furnished by Morris, Marshall, Faulkner & Company, in a style with painted ceilings and panelling which was similar to that of the Green Dining Room furnished by the company at the South Kensington Museum. William Morris worked on decorating the ceiling and walls of the house's dining room until 1881. This room also featured Cupid and Psyche, a frieze of 12 canvases started by Burne-Jones in 1870, based on the story in Morris's epic poem The Earthly Paradise. Burne-Jones completed it in 1882. Burne-Jones's painting Dies Domini hung in the drawing room. The decoration of Rosalind Howard's boudoir was entirely based around the hanging of his large 1879 painting The Annunciation.

The Howards later employed the company to decorate their other residences, Naworth Castle and Castle Howard, and their influence led to the commissioning of Webb as architect and the company as decorators for St Martin's Church, Brampton.

== Later history ==
Widowed in 1911, Rosalind Howard sold the house in 1920, moving along and across the street to 13 Kensington Palace Gardens.

In 1957 the Crown Commissioners broke the house up into apartments.
