= Hornby, North Yorkshire =

Village and civil parish in North Yorkshire, England

Coordinates: 54.443680°N 1.442128°W

Hornby
- Location within North Yorkshire
- Population: 238 (2011 census)
- OS grid reference: NZ362055
- Civil parish: Hornby
- Unitary authority: North Yorkshire
- Ceremonial county: North Yorkshire
- Region: Yorkshire and the Humber
- Country: England
- Sovereign state: United Kingdom
- Post town: NORTHALLERTON
- Postcode district: DL6
- Dialling code: 01609
- Police: North Yorkshire
- Fire: North Yorkshire
- Ambulance: Yorkshire

Hornby is a village and civil parish in the county of North Yorkshire, England. It lies on a minor road between Great Smeaton and Appleton Wiske.

It lies roughly 9 miles (14 km) from Northallerton, 9 miles (14 km) from Darlington, and 7 miles (11 km) from Yarm.

According to the 2001 census, Hornby had a population of 206, which increased in the 2011 census to 238.

From 1974 to 2023 it was part of the Hambleton District, it is now administered by the unitary North Yorkshire Council.

The village has very few amenities. There is a small church, a telephone box and a post box. The village pub is called the "Grange Arms".

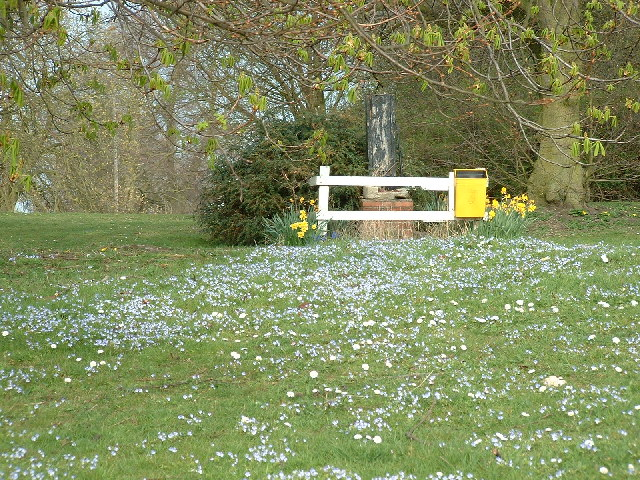
The village pump at Hornby

== Etymology ==
The name of the village is first attested in the Domesday Book of 1086 as Horenbodebi and in 1088 in the Durham Liber Vitae as Hornbotebi. The final element comes from the Old Norse word bý ('settlement'). The origin of the first part of the name is less certain, but thought to come from a lost Old Norse personal name Hornbǫði. Thus the name once meant 'Hornbǫði's farm'. The modern form was perhaps influenced by the nearby Hornby, Richmondshire.

== See also ==
- Listed buildings in Hornby, North Yorkshire
