= Standen =

Historic house in West Sussex, United Kingdom

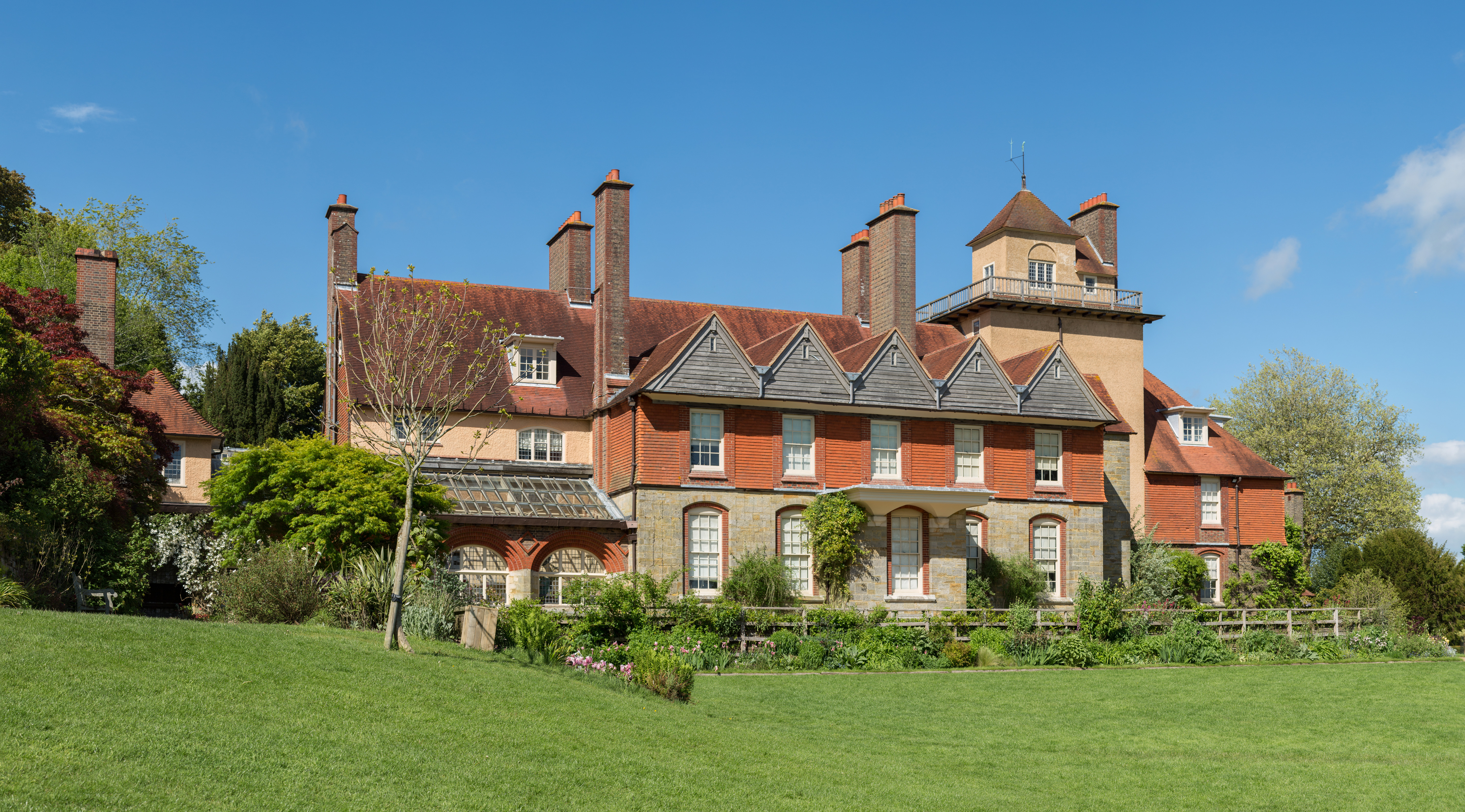

- Location within West Sussex
- 51°06′11″N 0°01′01″W
- Location: East Grinstead
- OS grid reference: TQ 38968 35598

History
- Built: 1892 - 1894

Site notes
- Area: West Sussex
- Architect: Philip Webb
- Architectural style: Wealden vernacular
- Owner: National Trust

Listed Building – Grade I
- Official name: Standen
- Designated: 28 January 1948
- Reference no.: 1249027

Standen is an Arts and Crafts house located to the south of East Grinstead, West Sussex, England. The house and its surrounding gardens belong to the National Trust and are open to the public. It is a Grade I listed building.

== House ==
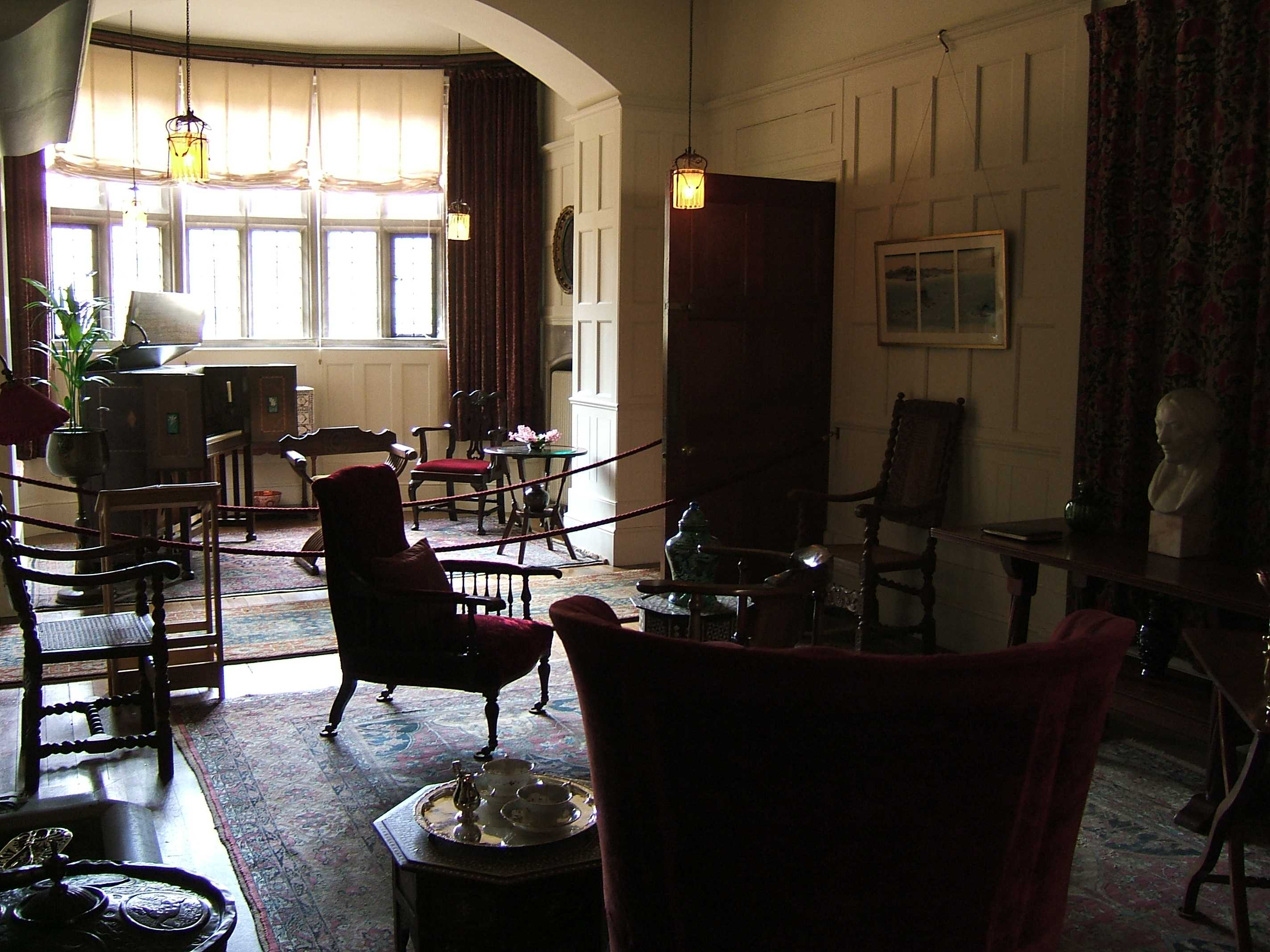
Interior of Standen

Between 1891 and 1894 architect Philip Webb, who was a friend of William Morris, designed the house for a prosperous London solicitor, James Beale, his wife Margaret, and their family of seven children. The house is constructed in the Wealden vernacular style with sandstone quarried from the estate and locally made bricks and tiles. The interior is decorated with Morris carpets, fabrics and wallpapers, with furnishings also by Morris, and the garden complements the beauty of the house. From the start the house had electric power, originally generated by a donkey engine in a shed by the old barn. The house still has its original electric light fittings, designed by William Arthur Smith Benson.

After Beale's death in 1912, Margaret Beale continued to live at Standen. When she died in 1936, their unmarried daughter, Margaret, succeeded her, and after her death in 1947, Standen came into the possession of Helen, their youngest daughter, also unmarried. On Helen's death in 1972 the house passed by bequest to the National Trust.

== Estate and garden ==
The estate was formed from three farms which the Beales purchased in 1890. The Beales started planting a 12-acre (4.9 ha) garden almost immediately after they had purchased the land, using the site of an 18th-century garden and orchard. In early 1891 trees were planted, a yew hedge established and the kitchen garden begun.

The Beales consulted a London landscape gardener, G.B. Simpson, who drew up a layout that assumed that the new house would be located on the line of the existing terrace. However, Webb suggested that it rather be placed further into the hillside. The proposed planting schemes were characterised by strict geometrical layouts of colourful flowerbeds and shrubs. Webb preferred something else, however: a mixture of natural styles combining old-fashioned formality and compartmentalised gardens. Webb also designed a number of elements in the garden.

The resulting Arts and Crafts garden used local materials for its formal elements, and loose plantings amongst yew hedges, trellis and pergolas, emphasising natural colour schemes and subtle combinations of colour and foliage.

== Standen Wood ==
The National Trust acquired Standen Wood, originally part of the larger estate at the property, in 2001. The wood had been owned and managed as a nature reserve since the 1970s and is a haven for birds.
