= St Eloy's Church, Great Smeaton =

Church in Great Smeaton, North Yorkshire, England

Coordinates: 54°26′04″N 1°27′53″W

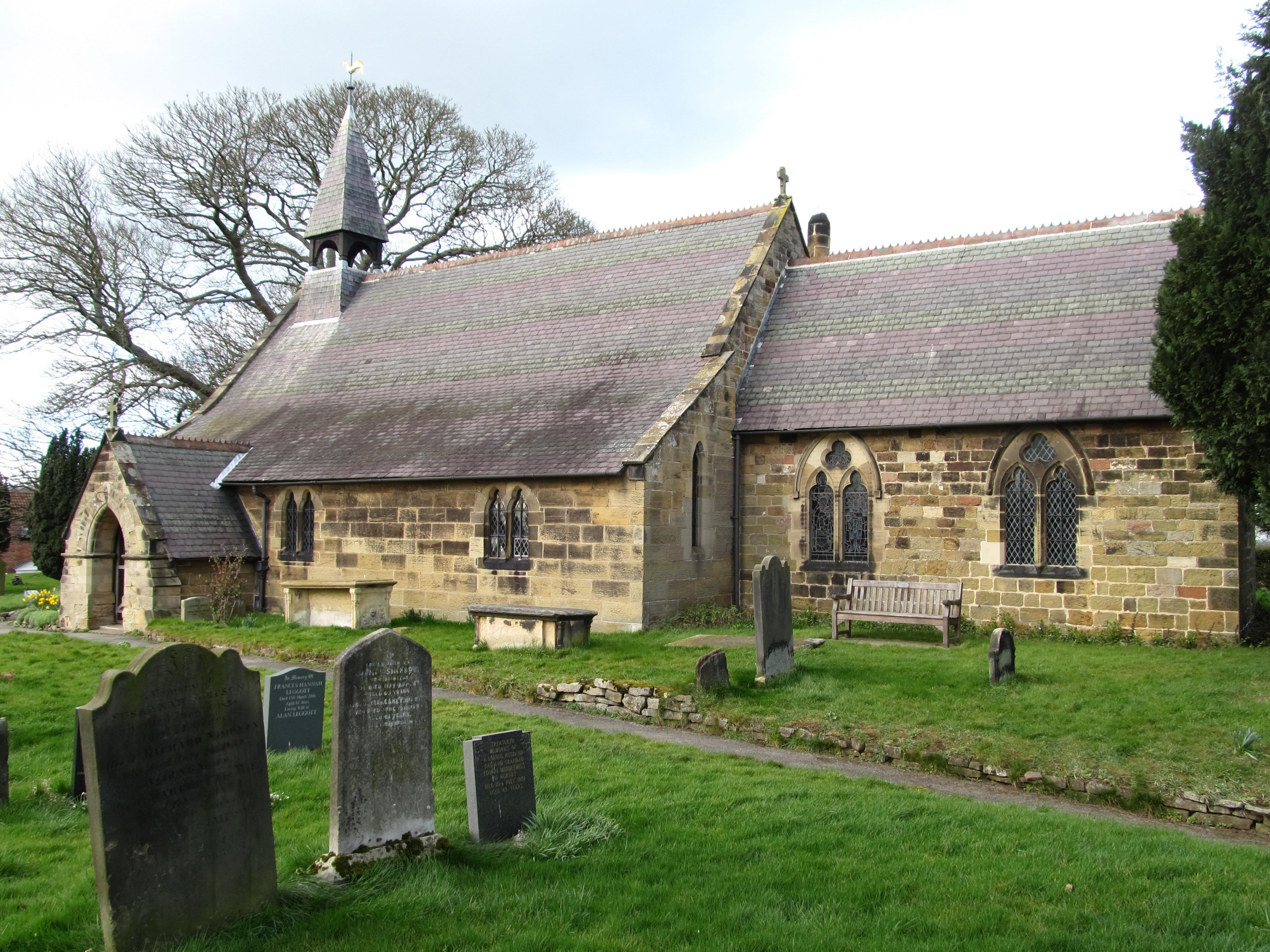
The church, in 2019

St Eloy's Church is an Anglican church in Great Smeaton, a village in North Yorkshire, in England.

There was a church in Great Smeaton at the time of the Domesday Book, and the font is from this period. The oldest part of the current building is the nave, dating from the 13th and 15th centuries. The remainder of the church was rebuilt in 1862 by G. E. Street. It was grade II listed in 1970. It is the only church in England dedicated to Saint Eloy.

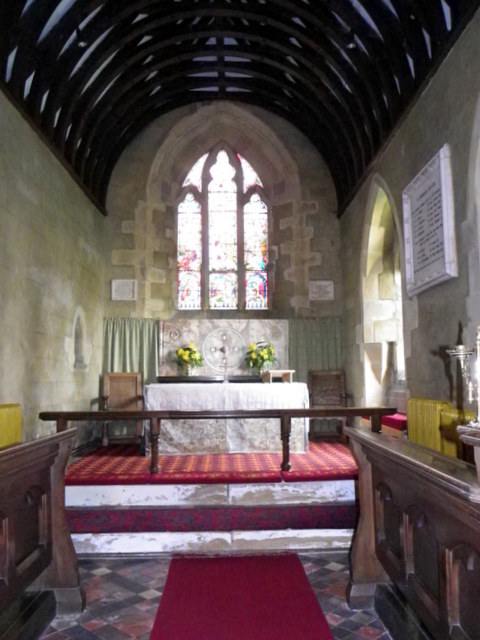
View into the chancel

It is built in stone with a Welsh slate roof, and consists of a nave, a south aisle, a south porch, and a lower chancel with a north vestry. At the west end is a bellcote with arcaded sides, and a tall pyramidal roof. The porch is gabled and has an entrance with a pointed arch, a chamfered surround under a relieving arch, impost bands, stone coping, and a cross.

== See also ==
- Listed buildings in Great Smeaton
