= Frederic Stuttig =

- Born: Louis Frederic Auguste Stuttig; 29 August 1862; Paris, France
- Died: 12 December 1947 (aged 85)
- Occupation(s): Wood carver, wood worker, teacher
- Years active: 1891-1930
- Employer: Central School of Arts and Crafts
- Movement: Arts and Crafts movement
- Spouse: Mione Violet Cooke

Frederic Stuttig (29 August 1861 – 12 December 1947) was a wood carver, wood worker, and teacher. He was a longtime professor at The Central School of Arts and Crafts and with fellow designers of the Arts and Crafts movement was described as bringing "new life into the decaying traditions of carved and gilded picture and mirror frames".

== Life ==
Louis Frederic Auguste Stuttig was born in Paris on 29 August 1861. By 1891, he was working in London, the business partner of an antique furniture dealer in Wardour Street. He studied art at the Regent Street Polytechnic Art School.

Sometime before 1903, Stuttig became a wood carving teacher at The Central School of Arts and Crafts, founded in 1896 by the London County Council. His connection may have been initiated by W.R. Lethaby, the School's first principal. With George Jack, Stuttig ran the School of Architecture and Building Crafts. They were also responsible for the School of Cabinet work and Furniture. Stuttig was a professor at the School for 30 years.

Stuttig began exhibiting work in various Arts & Crafts Exhibitions in London from around 1899, as a carver and wood worker, and in association with his pupils and contacts from the Central School of Arts and Crafts. Over the course of seven exhibitions between 1899 and 1916, he was recorded as part of more than 50 exhibits.

Stuttig worked closely with a number of well known female carvers and gilders of the period, including Jessie Bayes, Emmeline Bayes, Kathleen Figgis, and Gwendoline Cox.

Stuttig married Mione Violet Cooke. He died on 12 December 1947.
