= Great Smeaton =

Village and civil parish in North Yorkshire, England

Coordinates: 54°26′03″N 1°27′50″W

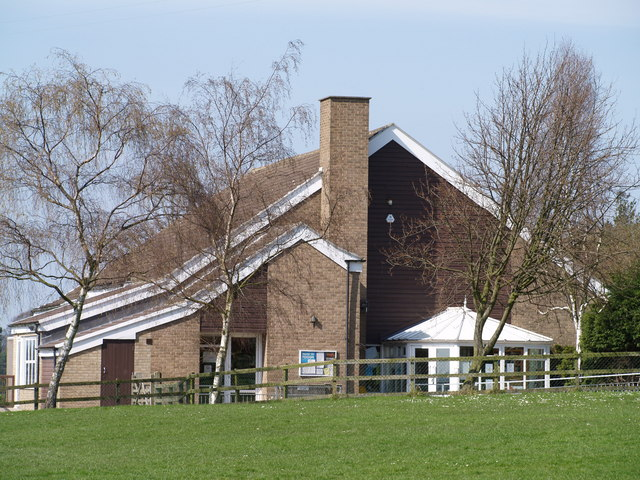
- Great Smeaton Community Primary School

- Location within North Yorkshire
- OS grid reference: NZ348045
- Unitary authority: North Yorkshire
- Ceremonial county: North Yorkshire
- Region: Yorkshire and the Humber
- Country: England
- Sovereign state: United Kingdom
- Post town: Northallerton
- Postcode district: DL6
- Police: North Yorkshire
- Fire: North Yorkshire
- Ambulance: Yorkshire
- UK Parliament: Richmond and Northallerton

Great Smeaton is a village and civil parish in North Yorkshire, England. It lies on elevated ground near the River Wiske, which is a tributary of the River Swale. The parish population at the 2011 census was 187.

== Etymology ==
The name of Great Smeaton is first attested in the Durham Liber Vitae for the years 966–72 in the phrase 'on smiþatune' ('in Smeaton'). The first attestation of the 'great' element is found in 1231, in the Latinised form Smithetuna Magna; this element distinguishes Great Smeaton from the neighbouring Little Smeaton. The name comes from the Old English words smiþ ('craftsman, smith') in its genitive plural form smiþa and tūn ('estate, village'). Thus the name once meant 'smiths' estate'.

== History ==
The A167 (Darlington Road) passes through the village, which is about halfway between Darlington and Northallerton. It once stood on the route of the Great North Road between London and Edinburgh. Great Smeaton was an important coaching stage; one of the original four inns still remain, the Black Bull; the Bay Horse having recently closed. Those that have gone were the Golden Lion at Entercommon and the Blacksmiths Arms in the village, which also traded as the Post Office in the 1840s. It seems to have ceased trading as an inn prior to 1857.

Great Smeaton is listed in the Domesday Book. Many armies have passed through the village over the years, including that of William the Conqueror on his way north.

Anne of Denmark had dinner at Smeaton on 10 June 1603 on her way to London from Edinburgh, and travelled on to stay the night at Breckenbrough Castle, home of Thomas Lascelles of Brackenborough and Sowerby.

St Eloy's Church, Great Smeaton, is the only church in Britain named after this saint and stands on the site of an 11th-century Saxon church.

Smeaton Manor is an Arts & Crafts style house by Philip Webb.

Great Smeaton, like many other villages, has suffered from rural decline over the last few decades. It has lost amenities such as the village shop, the butcher's shop, the blacksmiths, the post office and the Working Men's Club and Reading Room (established in 1880). Amenities that remain include the pubs and the church, Great Smeaton Community Primary School, the village hall and a saddlery shop. The village also has basic amenities such as a post box and a public telephone box.

Since 1972, the parish council has covered the parishes of Little Smeaton, Great Smeaton and Hornby. From 1974 to 2023 it was part of the Hambleton District, it is now administered by the unitary North Yorkshire Council.

== See also ==
- Listed buildings in Great Smeaton
