= John Daglish =

English footballer

Personal information
- Full name: John Daglish
- Date of birth: 6 November 1907
- Place of birth: Annfield Plain, England
- Date of death: 5 February 1962 (aged 54)
- Place of death: Stanley, England
- Height: 5 ft 10 in (1.78 m)
- Positions: Wing half; centre half

Senior career*
Years	Team	Apps	(Gls)
- South Moor
- West Stanley
- Annfield Plain
- White-le-Head Rangers
1930–1933	Darlington	14	(1)
1933–1934	Annfield Plain		
1934–1935	Gateshead	14	(0)
1935–1936	West Stanley		
1936–1937	South Shields		
1937–1941	Ashington		
- * Club domestic league appearances and goals

John Daglish (6 November 1907 – 5 February 1962) was an English footballer who played in the Football League for Darlington and Gateshead, and in non-league football for South Moor, West Stanley, Annfield Plain, White-le-Head Rangers, South Shields and Ashington. He played as a wing half, centre half or occasional full back.

== Life and career ==
Daglish was born in 1907 in Annfield Plain, County Durham, the son of Charles Daglish, a stoneman in a coal mine, and his wife Margaret. At the time of the 1911 Census, he was their only child. He played football for South Moor and for North-Eastern League clubs West Stanley, Annfield Plain and White-le-Head Rangers before signing for Football League Third Division North club Darlington in 1930.

Daglish made his debut at right half in the opening fixture of the season, on 30 August 1930 at home to Wigan Borough, a 3–2 defeat after which he lost his place to Fred Hopkinson and was restricted to reserve-team football in the North-Eastern League for a couple of months. In October, he was selected for the Rest of the North-Eastern League in the annual fixture against the reigning champions, who this year were Middlesbrough's reserves. Dalglish returned to Darlington's first team in November for a run of seven matches playing at centre half. He scored his first Football League goal in the last of the seven, at home to Stockport County: he passed to Maurice Wellock who lost the ball, but Daglish recovered it to "easily beat" Stockport's goalkeeper. However, a missed penalty by Dickson and what the Athletic News reported as "serious defensive lapses" contributed to a 3–2 defeat. Daglish made no more first-team appearances during 1930–31, and although he remained on their books for a further two seasons, played only rarely as cover, twice in 1931–32 and seven times in 1932–33, when he was sometimes used at full back.

He returned to the North-Eastern League and Annfield Plain for the 1933–34 season, and resumed his Football League career with another Third Division club, Gateshead, in June 1934. He played twice at left half early in the season – one of three tried in that position in the first four matches – had a run of eight games in the league team between December and February, and took his appearance total to 14 by the end of the season, but was not among the twelve players whose services were retained.

Daglish spent the 1935–36 season with West Stanley, and then signed for another North-Eastern League club, Ashington, in May 1937. He continued as a regular in the team until competitive football was suspended at the start of the Second World War and for a further two years in the wartime competitions, until the Ashington club closed down in August 1941. In his final season, he captained the team, missed only one match of the 33 played, and scored his first goal in three years. The Blyth News of 1940 highlighted his character as well as his skills:

It is well enough known that some veteran players have been inclined to resort to doubtful tactics in order to make up their declining speed and activity. But I feel sure that Jack Daglish will go to the end of his playing career with the reputation of playing the game in the best sense of the term. Undoubtedly he is not so nimble as many of his present day opponents although he can often neutralise his disadvantage in this respect by his cool and calculated counter-moves and sound positional play.

Away from football, Daglish was a schoolteacher. The 1939 Register records Daglish and his wife, Mary Nina, living in Broom Lane, Whickham. He was still resident at that address at the time of his death, which took place at Stanley County Mixed School in 1962.
