= Smeaton (surname) =

Smeaton also Smeton or Smieton is a surname. Notable people with the surname include:

- Alan Smeaton, Irish author and academic
- Bruce Smeaton, Australian composer
- Cooper Smeaton, Canadian ice hockey referee and coach
- George Smeaton (footballer) (1917–1978), Australian footballer
- George Smeaton (theologian) (1814–1889), Scottish theologian
- John Smeaton (1724–1792), English civil engineer
- John Smeaton (umpire), Australian cricket umpire
- John Smeaton (born 1976), Scottish baggage handler who assisted police during the 2007 Glasgow International Airport attack
- Mark Smeaton, English alleged royal adulterer
- Thomas Smeaton, also Thomas Smeton or Smieton, (1536–1583) a Scottish minister and Principal of Glasgow University
- Thomas Drury Smeaton (c. 1831–1908), banker and amateur scientist in South Australia
- Thomas Hyland Smeaton (c. 1857–1927), South Australian politician
- William Henry Oliphant Smeaton (1856–1914) Scottish writer
