= Lead oxychloride =

Lead oxychlorides are halide compounds of lead with the general formula PbClO(H).

== Occurrence in nature ==
Lead oxychlorides are found naturally in the minerals hereroite as Pb_{32}O_{21}2Cl_{10}, in rickturnerite as Pb_{7}O_{4}(OH)Cl_{3}, in vladkrivovichevite as Pb_{32}O_{18}Cl_{14}, in asisite as Pb_{7}SiO_{4}O_{4}Cl_{2}, in damaraite as Pb_{3}Cl(OH)O_{2}, in hereroite as Pb_{3}Cl(OH)O_{2}, in Mendipite as Pb_{3}Cl_{2}O_{2}, and in the dimorph minerals laurionite and paralaurionite, which are PbCl(OH) members of the matlockite group.

== Usage ==
Historically, the primary use of lead oxychlorides was in a mixture with other lead compounds (e.g. lead carbonate "white lead") as a pigment in lead paints. The lead compounds were first fused, and the product then ground to fine powder. The powder was then suspended in drying oils (e.g. linseed), to produce e.g. Pattinson's white (PbCl_{2} 2Pb(OH)_{2}) or Turner's yellow (PbCl_{2} 5-7PbO). Turner's yellow is also known as Patent yellow, Cassel yellow, Montpelier yellow, Kassler yellow, mineral yellow, and Verona yellow.

In the late 19th century, lead oxychlorides were briefly used in the manufacture of electrodes for lead-acid batteries. Patented by Charles Francis Brush in 1876, the depressions in a ribbed or grooved sheet of lead were filled with pulverized lead oxychloride (later also lead sulfate). In a second step, the grooved sheet was covered with paper and horizontally suspended in a salt or acid solution, to which a zinc plate was then also added. The mixture in the grooved sheet's depressions was then electrolytically reduced to sponge lead, forming a functional lead-acid cell electrode (if subsequently used as a positive electrode, the sponge lead was converted to lead peroxide during the cell's initial "formation" charge). Brush's technique was superseded by the now standard Faure pasting method in 1880.
