= George Jack (architect) =

George Washington Jack
- Born: 8 August 1855; Long Island, New York
- Died: 15 December 1931
- Occupation: Architect - Furniture Designer - Wood Carver
- Employer: Morris & Co.
- Style: Arts and Crafts movement
- Spouse: Annie Jack
- Children: Jessie Jack; Margery Jack

George Washington Henry Jack (8 August 1855 – 15 December 1931) was a British Arts and Crafts designer and architect. Born in America, he grew up and trained in Scotland, before moving south to join the office of Philip Webb. A contemporary of William Morris, Jack designed furniture for Morris & Co., and was a member of the Art Workers Guild and the Arts and Crafts Society. After the turn of the 20th century, he set up his own practice, which continued until his death.

== Biography ==
Jack was born on Long Island, New York, the son of an engraver of Scottish descent. On his father's early death in 1860, the young Jack was taken by his mother, a pianist, back to Scotland, where they settled in Glasgow. In 1869, Jack was articled to the office of Horatio Bromhead, where he met Thomas Hamilton Crawford. He then moved on to London, first joining the practice of Charles Vinall, and then, in 1880, the office of Philip Webb (1831–1915), the so-called "Father of Arts and Crafts Architecture".

Webb introduced Jack to William Morris (1834–1896), one of the leading figures of the Arts and Crafts Movement, and from 1885 Jack designed furniture for Morris & Co. He also developed skills in wood carving and other crafts, including mosaics and stained glass. He joined the Central School of Arts and Crafts on its foundation in 1896, teaching wood carving under the Principal, William Lethaby. With Frederic Stuttig, Jack ran the School of Architecture and Building Crafts, and was responsible for the School of Cabinet work and Furniture. From 1900, Jack also taught at the Royal College of Art. He published the handbook Woodcarving, Design and Workmanship in 1903.

After Webb's retirement in 1900, Jack continued his architectural practice, in partnership with Thomas Crawford from 1902 to 1907. In 1902, he purchased a house in Station Road, Church End, North London, which became his home, office and workshop. When World War I broke out, Jack joined the architecture department of London County Council, resuming his private practice after the war. Shortly before his death, aged 76 in December 1931, he was involved, with the architect Charles Winmill, in the renovations of St Margaret's Church, Barking. Jack also designed mosaics for Seoul Anglican Cathedral, Korea.

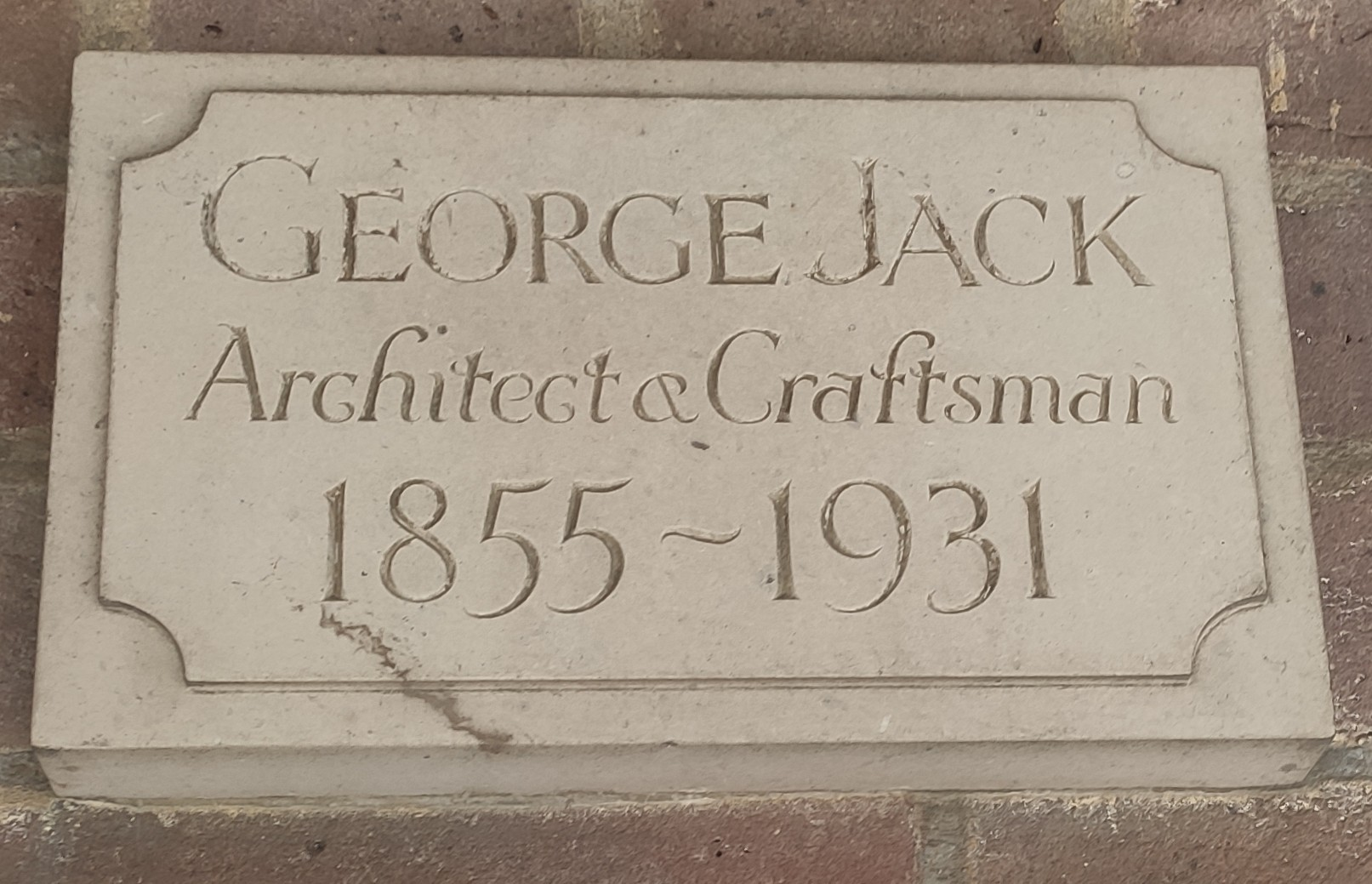
Plaque dedicated to George Jack at Golders Green Crematorium

Jack was cremated at Golders Green Crematorium.

In 2006, the William Morris Gallery, Walthamstow, hosted the first exhibition devoted to the work of George Jack.
