= Little Smeaton, Hambleton =

Hamlet in North Yorkshire, England

Coordinates: 54.426899°N 1.46163°W

Little Smeaton
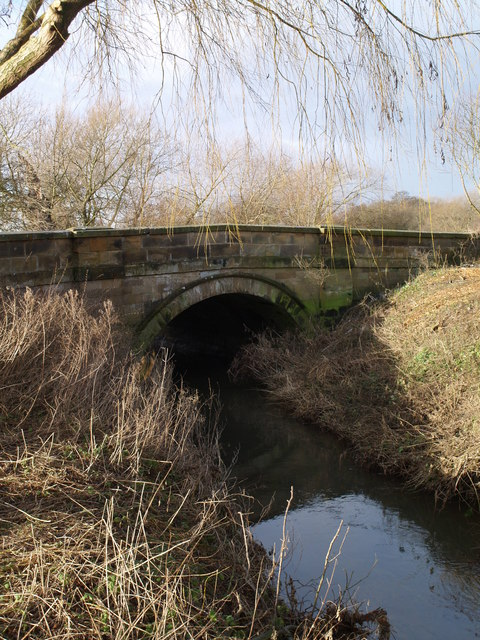

- Location within North Yorkshire
- Population: 50 (2015 NYCC)
- Civil parish: Little Smeaton
- Unitary authority: North Yorkshire
- Ceremonial county: North Yorkshire
- Region: Yorkshire and the Humber
- Country: England
- Sovereign state: United Kingdom
- Post town: Northallerton
- Postcode district: DL6
- Dialling code: 01845
- Police: North Yorkshire
- Fire: North Yorkshire
- Ambulance: Yorkshire
- UK Parliament: Richmond and Northallerton

Little Smeaton is a hamlet and civil parish in North Yorkshire, England. From 1974 to 2023 it was part of the Hambleton District, it is now administered by the unitary North Yorkshire Council.

== Etymology ==
The name of Little Smeaton is first attested in the Domesday Book of 1086 as Smidetun, Smidetune, and Smitune. The first attestation of the 'little' element is found two years later in the phrase 'in litle Smithetun' in the Durham Liber Vitae; this element distinguishes Little Smeaton from the neighbouring Great Smeaton. The name comes from the Old English words smiþ ('craftsman, smith') in its genitive plural form smiþa and tūn ('estate, village'). Thus the name once meant 'smiths' estate'.
