= Philip Webb =

English architect

Philip Speakman Webb
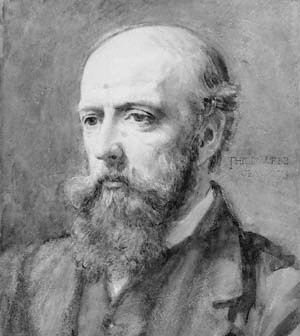
- Webb in 1873
- Born: 12 January 1831; Oxford, England
- Died: 17 April 1915 (aged 84); Worth, Sussex, England
- Occupation: Architect
- Buildings: Red House, Bexleyheath, Standen

Philip Speakman Webb (12 January 1831 – 17 April 1915) was a British architect and designer sometimes called the Father of Arts and Crafts Architecture. His use of vernacular architecture demonstrated his commitment to "the art of common building." William Morris, Edward Burne-Jones and Dante Gabriel Rossetti were his business partners and he designed many notable buildings including one for Morris. He co-founded the Society for the Protection of Ancient Buildings.

== Biography ==
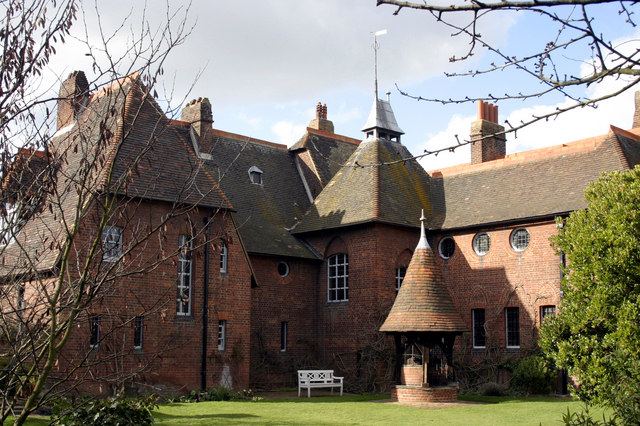
Red House, Bexleyheath, designed by Webb for William Morris

Born in Oxford, Webb studied at Aynho in Northamptonshire and was then articled to firms of builder-architects in Wolverhampton and Reading, Berkshire. He then moved to London where he eventually became a junior assistant to the architect George Edmund Street. While there he met William Morris in 1856 where he taught him the basics of construction. He would start his own practice in 1858. He is particularly noted as the designer of the Red House at Bexleyheath, south-east London in 1859 for William Morris, and – towards the end of his career – the house Standen (near East Grinstead in West Sussex). These were among several works in his favoured niche: country houses. A Greater London Council blue plaque commemorates both Webb and Morris at the Red House.

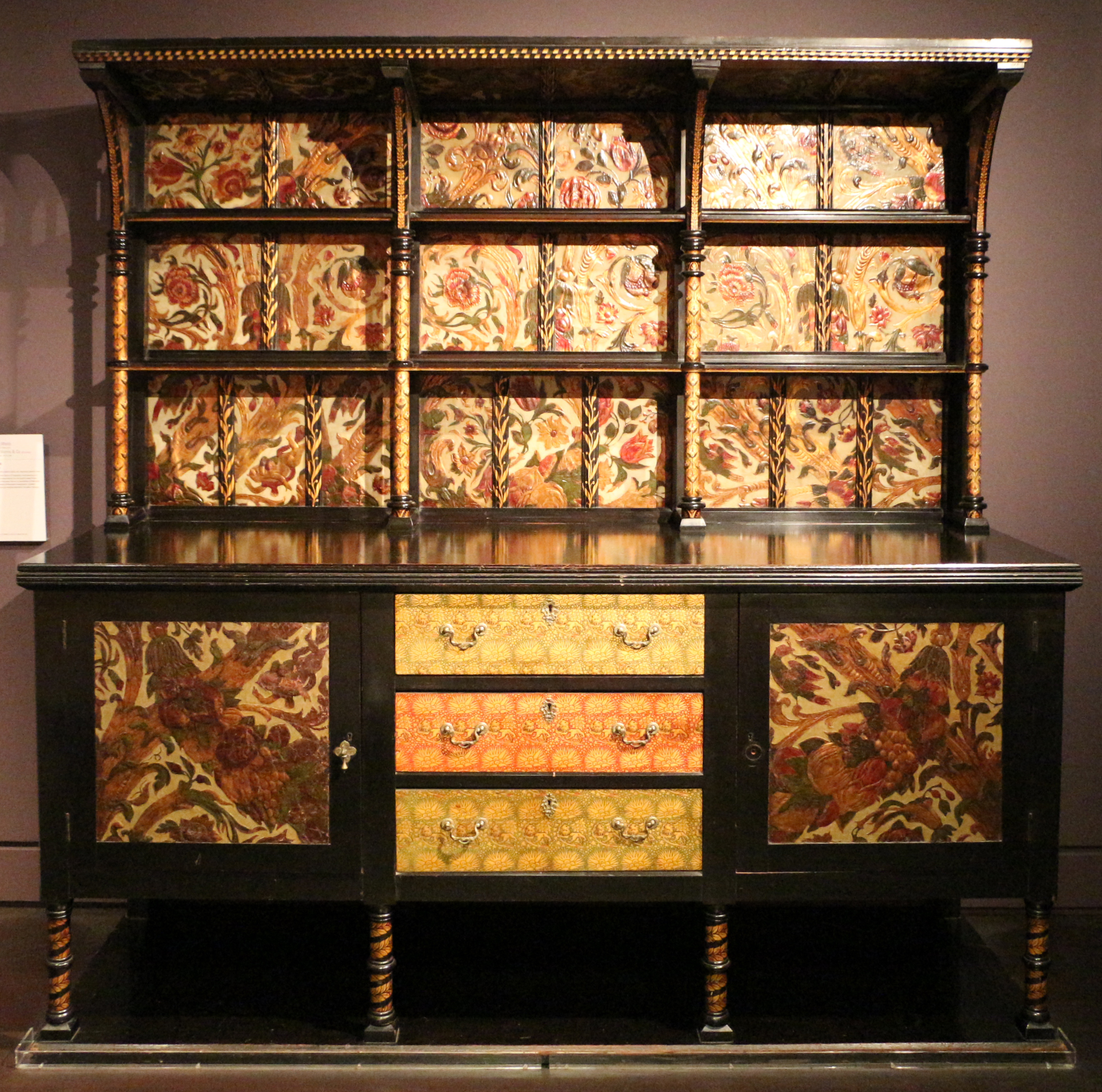
Buffet, designed by Philip Webb while working at Morris & Co, displayed at the Musée d'Orsay

Webb along with William Morris, Edward Burne-Jones and Dante Gabriel Rossetti would create the interior decorating and furnishing business, Morris, Marshall, Faulkner & Co., later to become Morris & Co, in April 1861. Webb would continue using skills developed during the construction of the Red House such as furniture, metalwork, and glass, while working at Morris & Co.

Webb and Morris formed an important part of the Arts and Crafts movement, and founded the Society for the Protection of Ancient Buildings in 1877. With Morris, Webb wrote the SPAB Manifesto, one of the key documents in the history of building conservation, where they advocated that the recent restoration of ancient buildings was ultimately destructive, and that they should remain unchanged. This goal of maintaining ancient buildings without fundamentally changing them was often undertaken by Webb, as is shown by the SPAB's Notes on the Repair of Ancient Buildings frequently citing repairs made by Webb as examples. He attended over 700 SPAB Committee meetings as well as undertaking numerous site visits. Webb also joined Morris's revolutionary Socialist League, becoming its treasurer.

George Howard of Naworth Castle near Brampton in Cumbria was an able artist and friend of the Pre-Raphaelites, and a keen patron of Philip Webb. Webb had built two houses for his Naworth Castle Estate: Four Gables and Green Lane House, as well as his London house at 1 Palace Green. Much financial help was offered by Charles Howard MP (George Howard's father) towards building a new church in Brampton on condition that he chose the architect. Webb's plan for St Martin's Church is quite unlike most other Victorian churches, with the body of the church being almost square. It is the only church designed by Webb, and contains an exquisite set of stained glass windows designed by Burne-Jones, and executed in the William Morris studio.

His friendship with the family of Sir Thomas Hugh Bell, a leading ironfounder of Middlesbrough, led to three commissions: Rounton Grange (demolished in 1953), Red Barns House in 1868, in which Gertrude Bell lived as a child, and the Bell Brothers office building in Middlesbrough (his only commercial development; later to be the Dorman Long offices). An additional commission in the Cleveland area was Briarmead, completed in 1883, located north of Greatham village, near Hartlepool. The adjoining St Francis Cottage was completed by W.F. Linton (Middlesbrough) in 1895 in the style of Webb.

In 1901 Philip Webb retired to the country and ceased practising. He continued to be an influence on the "school of rational builders" surrounding William Lethaby, and Ernest Gimson and his community of architect-craftsmen based at Sapperton in Gloucestershire. Between 1902 and 1903, Webb contributed to the design and manufacture of the University of Birmingham's ceremonial mace.

== Projects ==
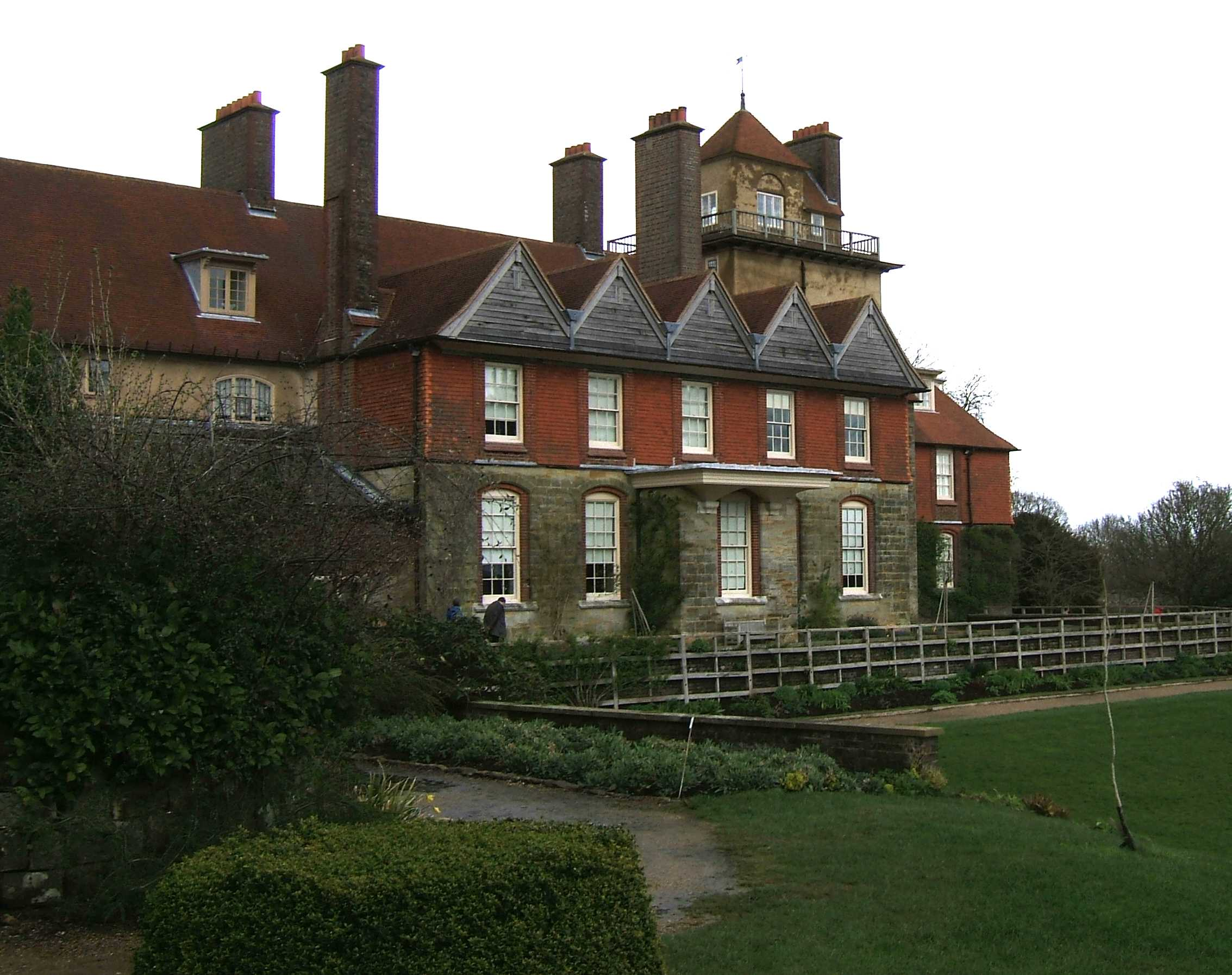
Standen

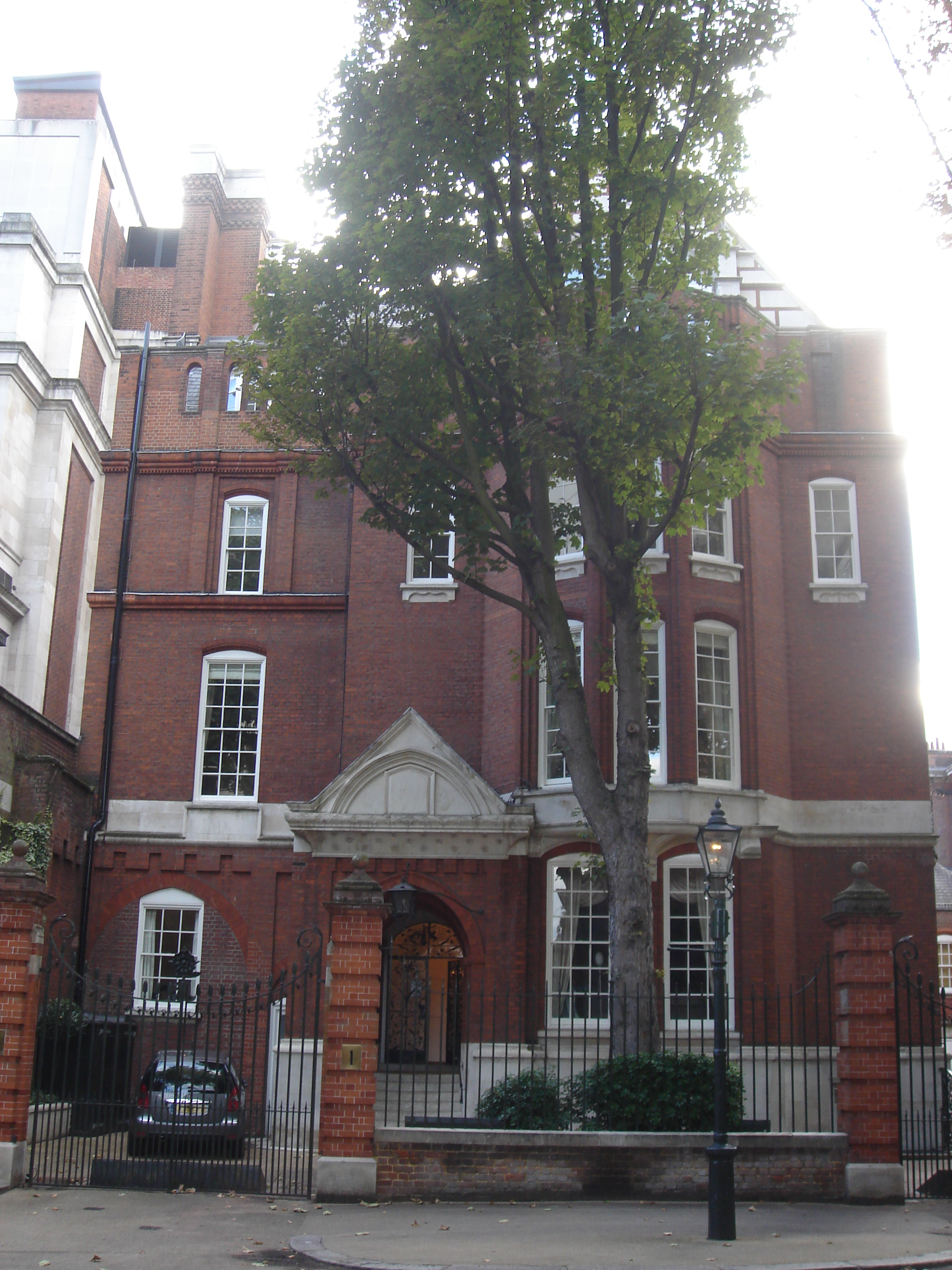
1 Palace Green, London

- Red House, Bexleyheath, (1859)
- Sandroyd, now Benfleet Hall, Cobham, Surrey (1860)
- Cranmer Hall wing, Fakenham (c.1860) and Coach House (1860)
- 91-101 Worship St, London EC2 (1862)
- Arisaig House, Highland (1863, rebuilt 1937)
- All Saints' and St Richard's Church of England Primary School, Old Heathfield, East Sussex, (Formerly Heathfield Church of England Primary School) (1864)
- 1 Palace Green, London (1868)
- Red Barns House, Redcar (1868)
- 19 Lincoln's Inn Fields, London (1868)
- The West House, 35 Glebe Place, Chelsea, London (1868–69) for George Price Boyce
- Joldwynds, Holmbury St Mary, Surrey (1874) Demolished 1930 and replaced with a Modernist house by Oliver Hill. Some ancillary buildings by Webb remain and are listed.
- Smeaton Manor, Yorkshire (1878)
- Four Gables, Green Lane House, Brampton, Cumbria
- St Martin's Church, Brampton (1878)
- Conyhurst, Surrey for Mary Ewart (1885)
- Clouds House, Wiltshire (1886)
- Naworth Castle, Cumbria
- Standen, West Sussex (1892–94)
- Bell & Co Ltd (offices), Zetland Rd, Middlesbrough (1891)
- Rounton Grange, near Middlesbrough (for Sir Isaac Lowthian Bell) – subsequently destroyed in 1953
- Forthampton Court, Forthampton, Gloucestershire (1889–92)
- Berkeley Castle, Gloucestershire (1874–77)
