= Yafforth Old Hall =

Building in North Yorkshire, England

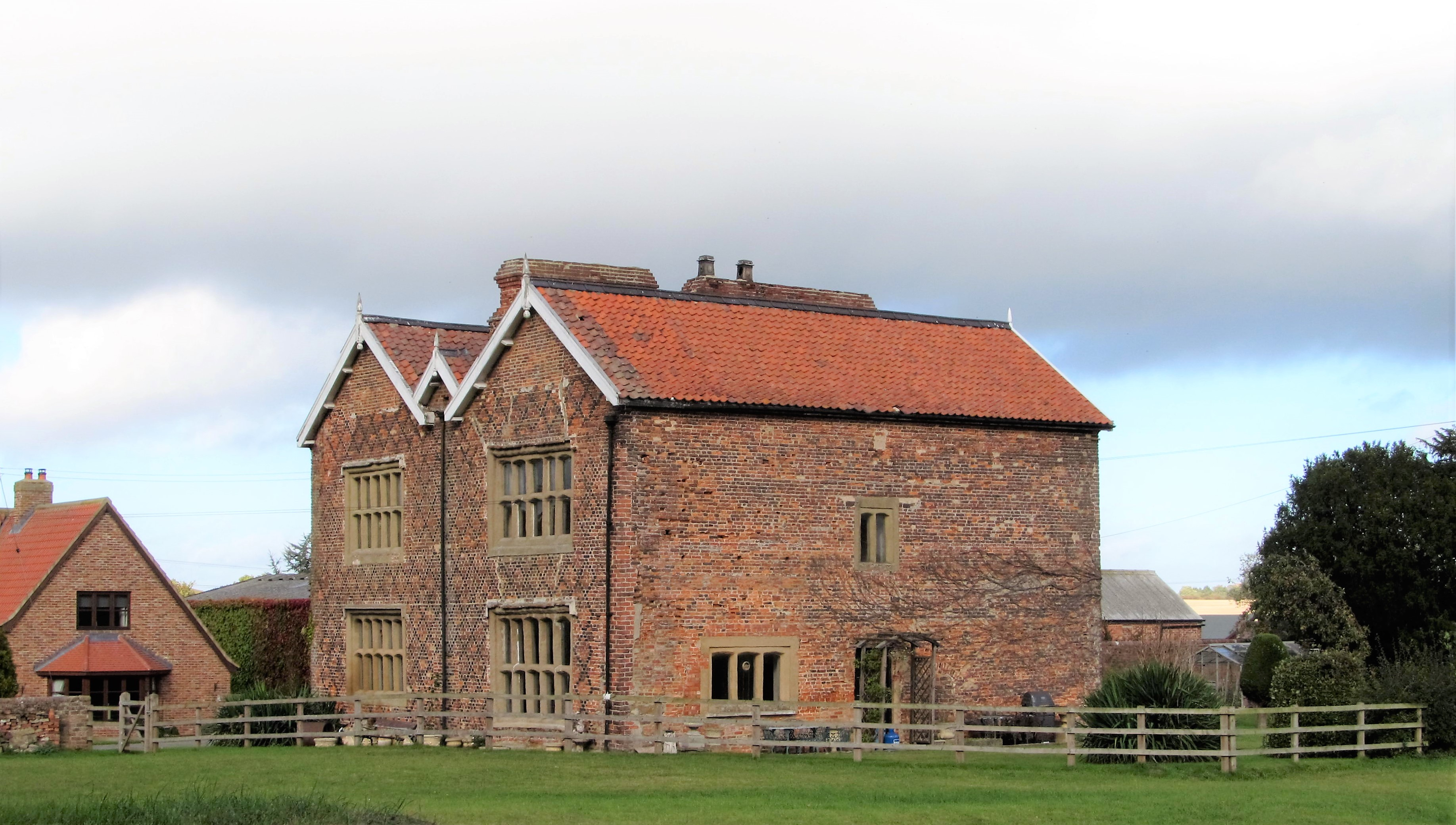
- The building in 2018

- Location within North Yorkshire

General information
- Type: Country house
- Location: Yafforth Road, Yafforth, North Yorkshire, England
- Coordinates: 54°20′43″N 1°28′16″W
- Year built: 1614

Listed Building – Grade II
- Official name: The Old Hall
- Designated: 29 January 1953
- Reference no.: 1315099

Yafforth Old Hall is a historic building on Yafforth Road in Yafforth, a village in North Yorkshire, England.

The country house was built in or before 1614, that date now being on the building. The southern part of the house, at least one bay but possibly more, was later demolished, and the external plaster was allowed to fall away. There may originally have been a third storey. The building was Grade II listed in 1953. That year it was purchased by Robert and Sarah Britton, the first owners to live in the building since its early years. A letter found in the attic in the 1880s suggested that Oliver Cromwell may have stayed in the house. A local legend claims that there are tunnels under the house which may lead to Howe Hill, or to All Saints' Church.

The house is built of red brick with black diapering, and has a pantile roof with oversailing eaves. There are two storeys and two bays. Each bay has a gable, between the gables is a smaller gable, and all have bargeboards and finials. On the front are large mullioned and transomed windows, one window has been infilled with a sash window, and the entrance is on the right return.

== See also ==
- Listed buildings in Yafforth
