= Newsham with Breckenbrough =

Civil parish in North Yorkshire, England

Coordinates: 54.255°N 1.415°W

- Civil parish
- Population: 128 (2011 census)
- OS grid reference: SE382845
- Civil parish: Newsham with Breckenbrough
- Unitary authority: North Yorkshire
- Ceremonial county: North Yorkshire
- Region: Yorkshire and the Humber
- Country: England
- Sovereign state: United Kingdom
- Post town: THIRSK
- Postcode district: YO7
- Police: North Yorkshire
- Fire: North Yorkshire
- Ambulance: Yorkshire

Newsham with Breckenbrough is a civil parish in the county of North Yorkshire, England and lies on the A167. The population of the parish at the 2011 census was 128.

The parish has two Grade II* listed buildings – the West Lodge to Thornton Stud and its gateway.

Anne of Denmark with Prince Henry and Princess Elizabeth stayed at Breckenbrough Castle on 10 June 1603 as guests of Thomas Lascelles while on their way to London. The castle has been demolished and only earthworks remain. In 1618 there were two brick towers with a hall between, with two wings from the towers forming a courtyard.

== Governance ==
The village shares a parish council with the neighbouring parish of Kirby Wiske.

From 1974 to 2023 it was part of the Hambleton District, it is now administered by the unitary North Yorkshire Council.

== See also ==
- Listed buildings in Newsham with Breckenbrough
