= Listed buildings in Kirby Wiske =

Kirby Wiske is a civil parish in the county of North Yorkshire, England. It contains ten listed buildings that are recorded in the National Heritage List for England. Of these, two are listed at Grade II*, the middle of the three grades, and the others are at Grade II, the lowest grade. The parish contains the village of Kirby Wiske and the surrounding area. The listed buildings consist of a church and a cross in the churchyard, houses, cottages and associated structures, and a bridge.

== Key ==
Grade	Criteria
II*	Particularly important buildings of more than special interest
II	Buildings of national importance and special interest

== Buildings ==
Name and location	Photograph	Date	Notes	Grade
St John the Baptist's Church; 54.25775°N 1.42393°W		12th century	The church has been altered and extended through the centuries, and was restored in 1872–73 by G. E. Street. It is built in stone with a slate roof, and consists of a nave, north and south aisles, a south porch, a chancel with a north vestry, and a west tower. The tower has three stages, a plinth, diagonal buttresses, a three-light Perpendicular west window with a hood mould, clock faces, a band, two-light bell openings with pointed arches, and an embattled parapet. The south doorway is Norman, and has a round arch with two orders and a hood mould.	II*
Medieval cross 54.25763°N 1.42399°W	—	Medieval	The cross is in the churchyard of St John the Baptist's Church, to the south of the church. It is in stone, and consists of a short chamfered shaft on a square stepped plinth.	II
Maunby Hall; 54.27154°N 1.45556°W	centr	Early 18th century	The house is in red brick, with quoins, and pantile roofs with stone coping, shaped kneelers and a gable with moulded bargeboards. There are two storeys, a central range of six bays, a gabled cross-wing on the left, and a lower nine-bay wing on the right. The right wing contains two doorways, one with a stone architrave inscribed with initials and the date, to the right is a doorway with an architrave and a keystone, and further to the right is a carriage opening. Also to the right is a wooden clock tower, on which is a square Doric bell tower with a cornice. The windows in all parts are sashes.	II
Gate piers north of Maunby Hall and wing walls 54.27182°N 1.45559°W	centr	18th century	The gate piers are in rusticated stone, each on a plinth and with a cornice and a shaped pyramidal cap. The flanking wing walls are in brick with stone coping.	II
Gate piers northeast of Maunby Hall and quadrant walls 54.27162°N 1.45523°W	—	18th century	The gate piers are in rusticated stone, each on a plinth and with an entablature, a cornice and a shaped pyramidal cap. The flanking quadrant walls are in brick with stone coping.	II
Daffodil Cottage; 54.25739°N 1.42453°W	—	Late 18th century	Two cottages in red brick, with stepped eaves, and pantile roofs with brick coping. The cottage facing the road has one storey and two bays, and a central doorway. The other cottage, dating from the 19th century, is at right angles at the rear, and has two storeys and two bays. The central doorway has a cambered brick arch, and the windows in both cottages are horizontally-sliding sashes.	II
Kirby Bridge; 54.25738°N 1.42234°W	—	Late 18th century	The bridge carries a road over the River Wiske. It is in stone, and consists of three segmental arches, the middle the largest. The bridge has voussoirs and a hood mould in the centre, flanking pilasters, a stone band and a plain parapet.	II
The Mount; 54.25822°N 1.42488°W	—	Late 18th to early 19th century	The house is in red brick with an eaves band and a pantile roof. There are two storeys and four bays. The doorway has a brick arch, and the windows are sashes with flat brick arches, those in the upper floor horizontally-sliding.	II
Sion Hill Hall and wall 54.25421°N 1.42835°W		1913	A large house designed by W. H. Brierley, it is in handmade red brick, with Portland stone dressings, quoins, a floor band, and hipped tile roofs with oversailing eaves. There are two storeys, a central range of three bays, and projecting wings with six bays on the left and four on the right, and a four-bay service wing on the left. The middle bay of the central range is in Portland stone, and contains an Ionic doorcase, and a doorway with an architrave, a fanlight, keystones, and an open round-headed pediment containing the date, and above it is a window with an architrave, scrolled at the bottom. The doorway is flanked by Venetian windows in segmental arches, and most of the other windows are sashes. The garden front has twelve bays, and contains four French windows. The attached courtyard wall is in brick with stone coping and wooden railings, and in the centre are brick gate piers with stone cornices and ball finials.	II*
Lodge, Sion Hill Hall; 54.25765°N 1.42747°W	—	1913	The lodge, designed by W. H. Brierley, is in red brick, with a dentilled and moulded floor band, and a swept pantile roof. There is one storey and an attic, and two bays. In the centre is a gabled porch on timber columns. It is flanked by horizontally-sliding sash windows, and in the returns are casement windows.	II
