= Ainderby Steeple =

Village and civil parish in North Yorkshire, England

Coordinates: 54.323529°N 1.488603°W

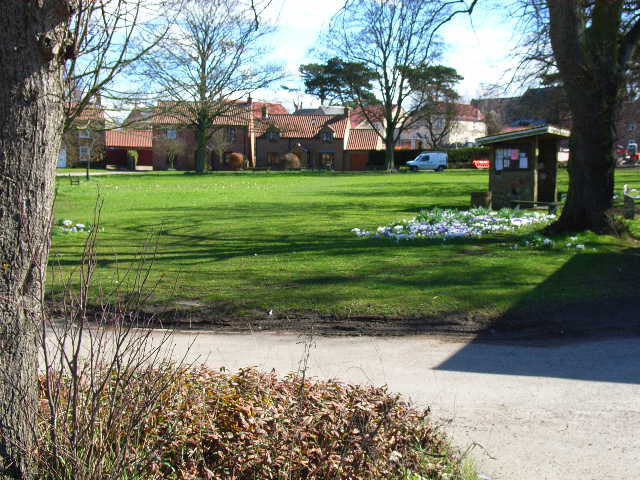
- Spring flowers on the village green, Ainderby Steeple

- Location within North Yorkshire
- Population: 298 (including North Otterington and Warlaby. 2011 census)
- OS grid reference: SE333921
- Unitary authority: North Yorkshire
- Ceremonial county: North Yorkshire
- Region: Yorkshire and the Humber
- Country: England
- Sovereign state: United Kingdom
- Post town: NORTHALLERTON
- Postcode district: DL7
- Police: North Yorkshire
- Fire: North Yorkshire
- Ambulance: Yorkshire
- UK Parliament: Richmond and Northallerton

Ainderby Steeple is a village and civil parish in North Yorkshire, England. Ainderby Steeple is situated on the A684 approximately 2.6 miles (4.2 km) south-west of the county town of Northallerton, and to the immediate east of Morton-on-Swale.

== History ==
The toponymy of the village is derived from the Old Norse personal name of Eindrithi and the word bi for farm with the addition of the Anglian word stēpel for steeple, giving Eindrithi's farm with a steeple.

The village is mentioned twice in the Domesday Book of 1086 as Eindrebi. Some of the lands were part of the manor of Northallerton at the time of the Norman Conquest in 1066, which was held by Edwin, Earl of Mercia. After Edwin's rebellion of 1071, it became Crown property (indeed, the only Crown property in the entire Land of Count Alan). Most of the other land was in the manor of Ellerton-on-Swale, with land held by Thorkil and Ulfkil before the Norman invasion, and Ansketil of Forneaux afterwards. The Funeaux family are recorded as lords of the manor until the early 14th century, when Geoffrey le Scrope bought the lands. The manor continued to be owned by his descendants, albeit with a couple of incidents when the Crown took possession, until 1517 when the eleventh Lord Scrope had no male heir. The manor was divided among his children, and ended up in the possession of Robert Roos by way of the Strangeway family. By the 19th century claims to the manor had fallen into abeyance.

== Governance ==
The village is in the Richmond and Northallerton UK Parliament constituency. From 1974 to 2023 it was part of the Hambleton District, it is now administered by the unitary North Yorkshire Council.

== Geography ==
The village lies on the A684 road between Northallerton and the A1M motorway. It is less than a mile from the River Swale. How Beck, a tributary of the Swale has its source on the southern outskirts of the village. The River Wiske lies 1.1 miles (1.8 km) to the east of the village. The villages of Morton-on-Swale and Thrintoft are within a mile. The highest point in the village is 141 feet (43 m).

The parish boundary to the west of the village extends to the outskirts of Morton-on-Swale and runs roughly north to south from a half mile north of the village to the south of Green Hills farm. The eastern boundary is formed by the River Wiske just one mile away and extends from just north of Barstow Hall farm to the outskirts of Warlaby. The northern boundary runs slightly north eastwards a half a mile from the A684. The neighbouring parishes consist of Yafforth, Romanby, Thrintoft, Morton-on-Swale and Warlaby.

The Wensleydale Railway Association that runs from Redmire to Leeming Bar, was extended to run just to the north of the village to the East Coast Main Line just to the west of Northallerton. Two level crossings were constructed in the village.

== Demography ==
Population
Year	1881	1891	1901	1911	1921	1931	1951	1961	2001	2011
Total	222	224	241	235	241	256	254	249	285	298

The 2001 UK Census showed that the population was split 48.8% male to 51.2% female. The religious constituency was made of 82.1% Christian and the rest stating no religion or not stating at all. The ethnic make-up was 97.5% White British, 1.75% White other and 1.05% Indian British. There were 121 dwellings.

The 2011 UK Census showed the population was split 48.7% male to 51.3% female. The religious constituency was made of 82.6% Christian, 0.3% Buddhist and the rest stating no religion or not stating at all. The ethnic make-up was 98.3% White British with the rest consisting of 0.3% each White Irish, White Other, Mixed White/Asian and Black British. There were 136 dwellings.

== Community and culture ==
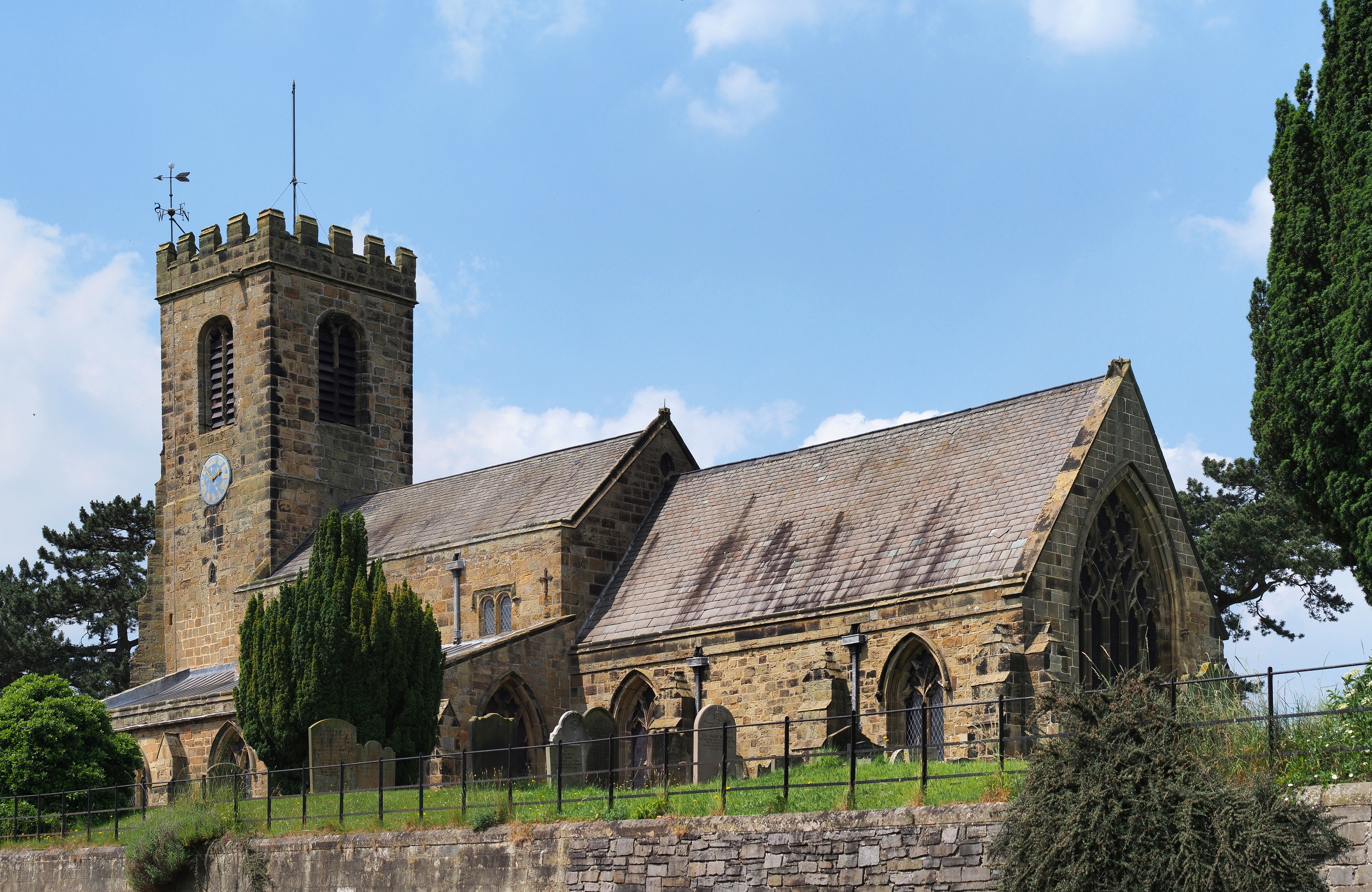
St Helen's Church, Ainderby Steeple

Ainderby Steeple CE Primary is in the catchment area of Northallerton School, which provides secondary education and sixth form facilities. The school is on Station Road in Morton-on-Swale. The village is mainly residential with one public house.

== Religion ==
The Church of St Helen's dates from the 14th century. The parish registers start in 1668. It was Grade I listed in 1970 and was renovated in the 15th and 19th centuries.

== Notable buildings ==
Howden Bridge over the River Wiske on the eastern boundary of the parish is a scheduled ancient monument.

== See also ==
- Listed buildings in Ainderby Steeple
