= Thornton Stud =

Country estate in Thornton-le-Street, North Yorkshire, England

Coordinates: 54°15′56″N 1°23′14″W

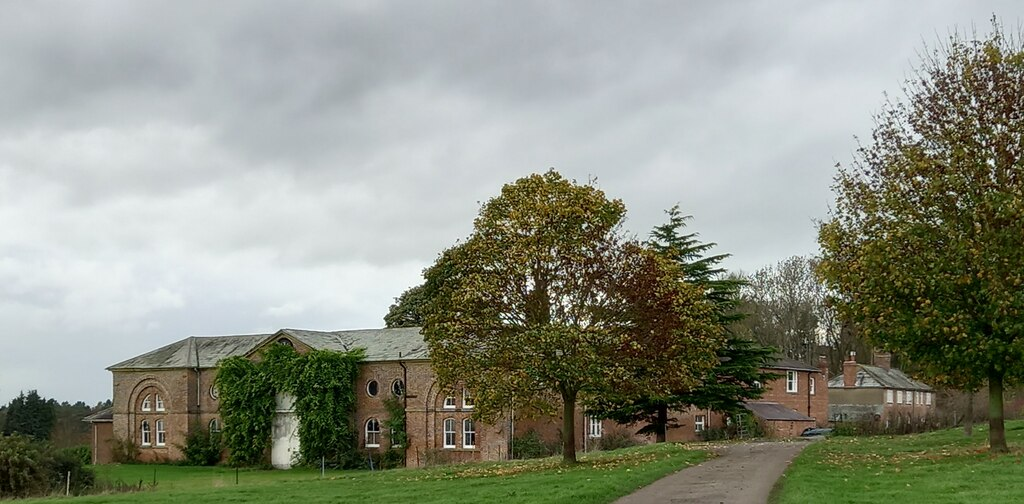
Stables at Thornton Stud

Thornton Stud is a country estate in Thornton-le-Street, a village in North Yorkshire, in England.

The Talbot family commissioned a country house named "Wood End", which was constructed in the 1660s or 1670s. In 1794, it was purchased by the Crompton family, the work including the construction of stables, east and west lodges, and the laying out of the grounds, to a design by Samuel Crompton. In the early 20th century it was owned by Clare Vyner, who set up a horseracing stud farm. He later purchased Studley Royal and, preferring to live there, sold the house, by then known as "Thornton Hall". The house was demolished in the late 1920s, but the parkland, woodland survive largely unchanged. The property has since been run as a stud, with owners including Edward Stanley, 17th Earl of Derby, Victor Sassoon, and John Scott-Ellis, 9th Baron Howard de Walden.

== Architecture ==
=== Stables ===
The stables, built of red brick with stone dressings and a stone slate roof, are now the main building on the estate. They were built at the end of the 18th century, and extended to the rear in the 20th century, and are now grade II listed. They are two storeys high and nine bays wide, originally with a square plan. At the front, the three centre bays come further forward, while the end bays are wider. In the centre is a round carriage arch, with blind openings either side. There are arched windows in the outer bays. The central bays have a pediment containing a clock.

=== West Lodge ===
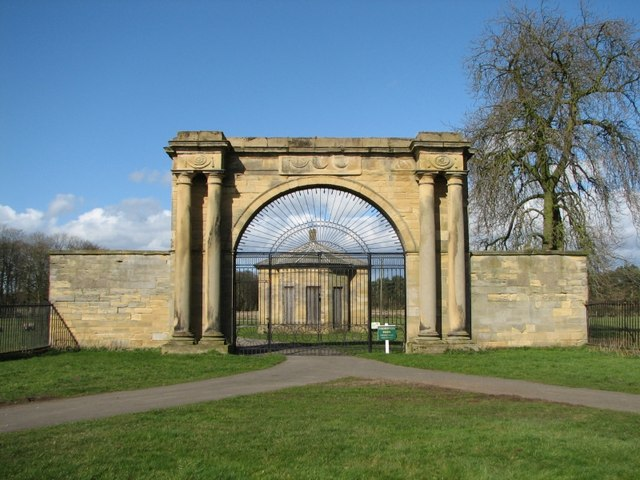
West Lodge, with gateway in front

The West Lodge, and the gateway and walls in front of it, are both late 18th century and are separately grade II* listed. The lodge is built of stone at the front, and brick on the sides, with a hipped stone slate roof. It has two storeys and a front of one bay. The main front has a single storey, a plinth, a full-height canted bay window, a moulded band, a plain frieze, and a moulded cornice. In the returns are windows with flat brick arches.

The gateway is built of stone, and has a central semicircular carriage archway, with a moulded archivolt and an impost band, flanked by paired Tuscan columns with reeded capitals. Over the columns is a frieze with swags and oval paterae, in the centre is a panel with three swags, over which is a cornice and a blocking course. The arch is filled with a fan and gates in wrought iron. The arch is flanked by short walls, and iron railings, and at each end is a rusticated pier, with a plinth, a frieze with swags and urns, a cornice and stepped blocking course.

=== East Lodges ===
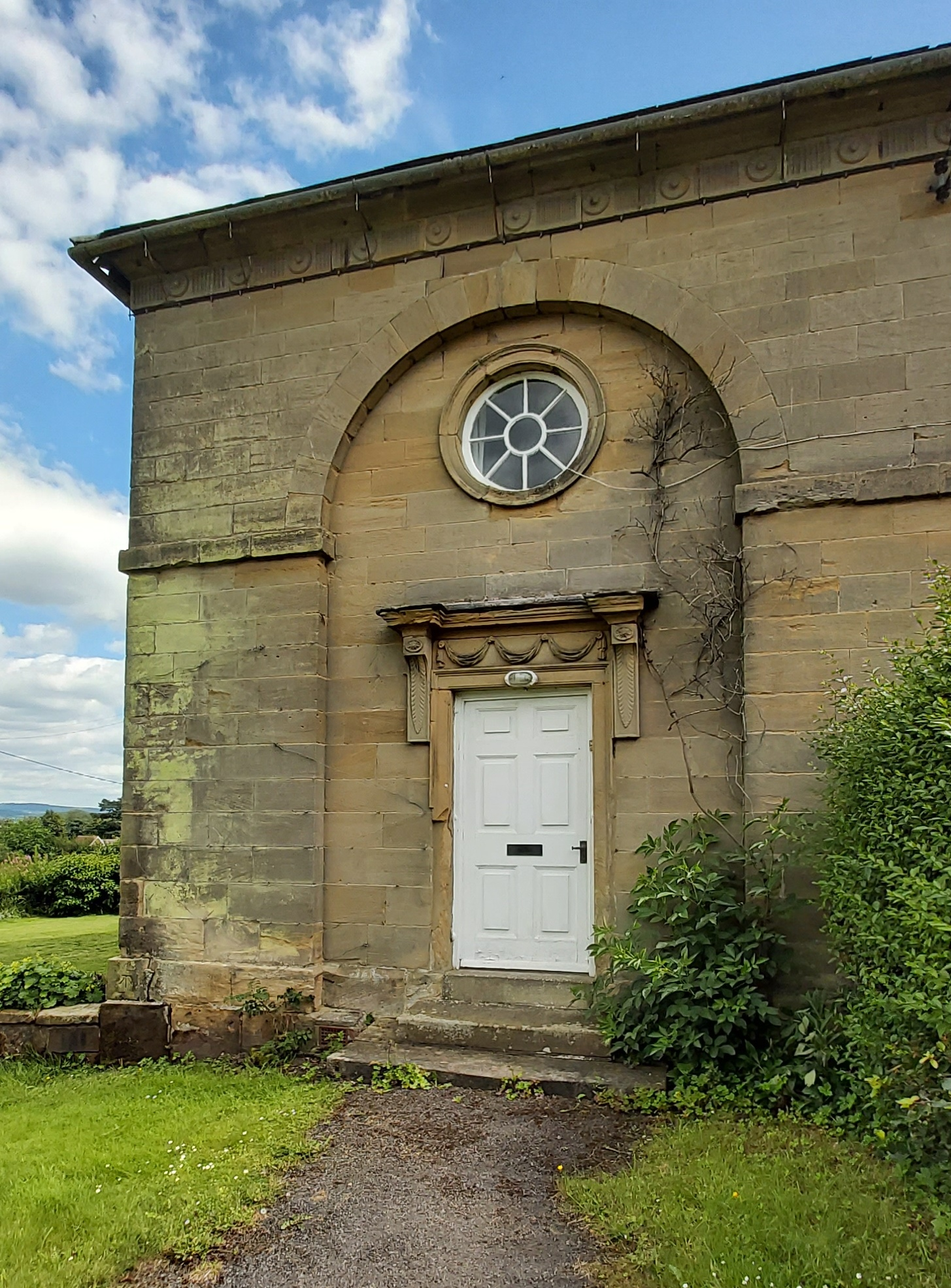
One of the East Lodges

The pair of East Lodges are built of stone, which is rendered at the rear, and have slate roofs. They are collectively grade II listed. Each has a square plan, is two storeys high, and a single bay wide. At the front of each is a large Venetian window, with a swagged frieze, cornice and archivolt. The central stonework comes slightly further forward, and has a pediment above. There are single-storey 20th-century extensions to the rear.

== See also ==
- Grade II* listed buildings in North Yorkshire (district)
- Listed buildings in Newsham with Breckenbrough
- Listed buildings in Thornton-le-Street
