= St John the Baptist's Church, Kirby Wiske =

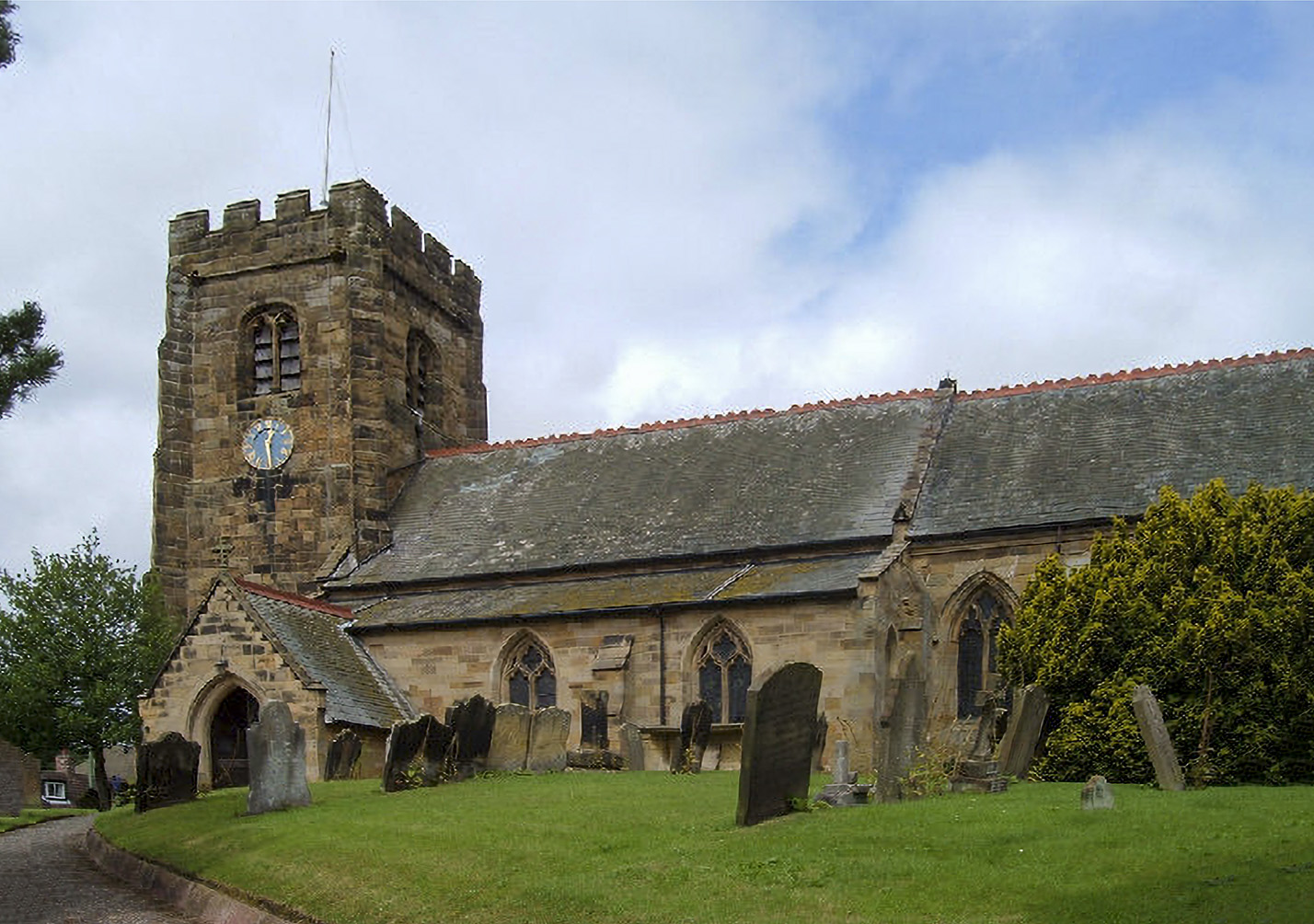
- St John the Baptist's Church, Kirby Wiske
- St John the Baptist's Church, Kirby Wiske
- 54°15′27″N 1°25′27.59″W
- OS grid reference: SE 37630 84832
- Location: Kirby Wiske, North Yorkshire
- Country: England
- Denomination: Church of England

History
- Dedication: St John the Baptist

Architecture
- Heritage designation: Grade II* listed

Administration
- Province: York
- Diocese: Leeds
- Archdeaconry: Richmond and Craven
- Deanery: Wensley
- Parish: Ainderby Steeple with Yafforth and Kirby Wiske with Maunby

St John the Baptist's Church, Kirby Wiske is a Grade II* listed parish church in the Church of England in Kirby Wiske, North Yorkshire.

== History ==
The church has been altered and extended through the centuries, and was restored in 1872–73 by G. E. Street. It is built in stone with a slate roof, and consists of a nave, north and south aisles, a south porch, a chancel with a north vestry, and a west tower. The tower has three stages, a plinth, diagonal buttresses, a three-light Perpendicular west window with a hood mould, clock faces, a band, two-light bell openings with pointed arches, and an embattled parapet. The south doorway is Norman, and has a round arch with two orders and a hood mould.

== Parish status ==
The church is in a joint parish with

- St Helen's Church, Ainderby Steeple
- St Andrew's Church, Great Fencote
- St Wilfrid's Church, Great Langton
- St Mary's Church, Kirkby Fleetham
- St Radegund's Church, Scruton
- All Saints' Church, Yafforth

== Organ ==
A pipe organ was built in 1883 at a cost of £400 by Isaac Abbott of Leeds. A specification of the organ can be found on the National Pipe Organ Register.

== See also ==
- Grade II* listed churches in North Yorkshire (district)
- Listed buildings in Kirby Wiske
