= St Helen's Church, Ainderby Steeple =

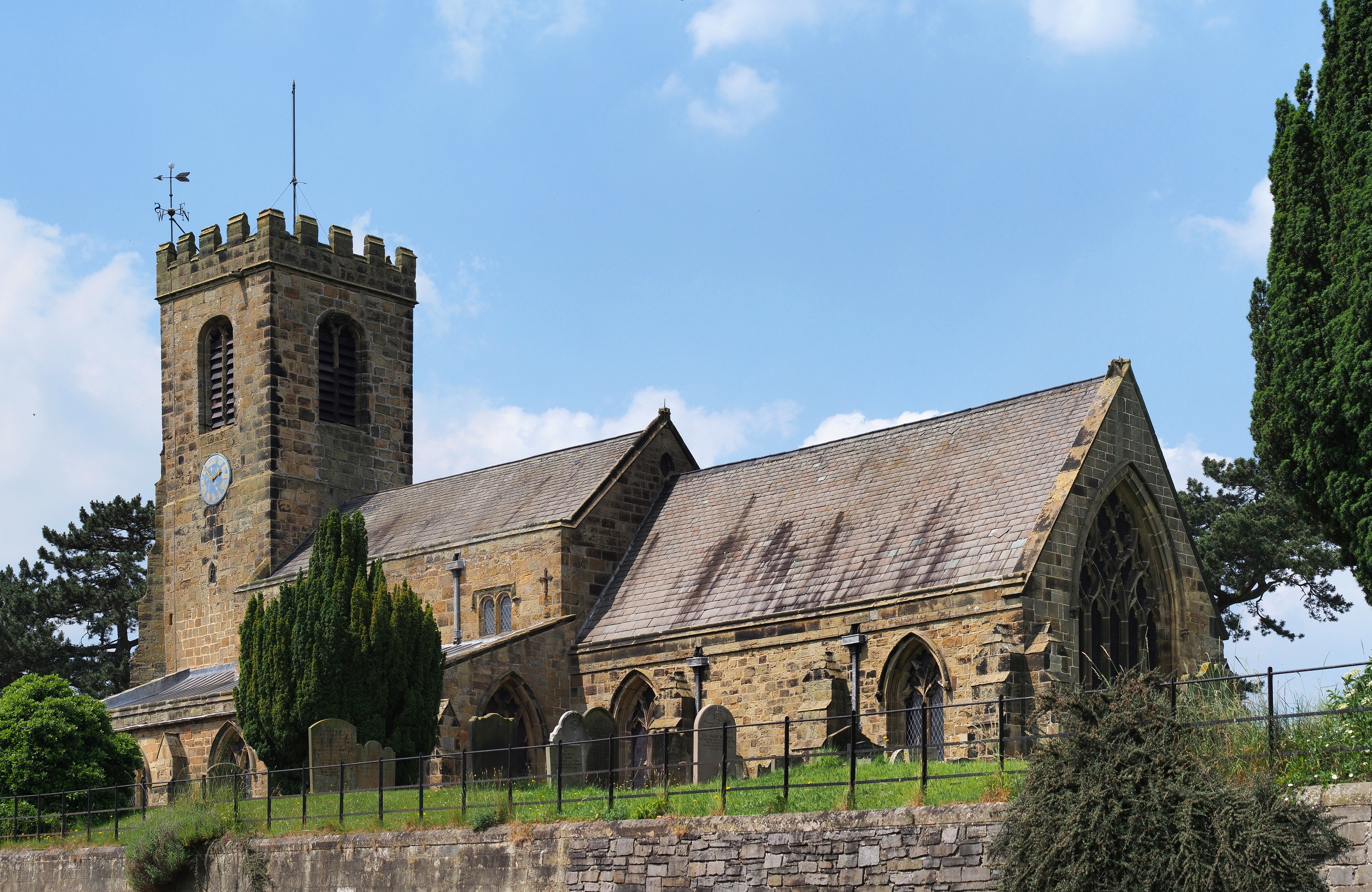
- St Helen's Church, Ainderby Steeple
- 54°19′22.92″N 1°29′10.39″W
- OS grid reference: SE 33463 92097
- Location: Ainderby Steeple, North Yorkshire
- Country: England
- Denomination: Church of England
- Website: lowerswalechurches.org.uk

History
- Dedication: St Helen

Architecture
- Heritage designation: Grade I listed

Administration
- Province: York
- Diocese: Leeds
- Archdeaconry: Richmond and Craven
- Deanery: Wensley
- Parish: Ainderby Steeple with Yafforth and Kirby Wiske with Maunby

St Helen's Church, Ainderby Steeple is a Grade I listed parish church in the Church of England in Ainderby Steeple, North Yorkshire.

== History ==
The church dates from the first half of the fourteenth century. An earlier church, thought to be 12th century, occupied the site but this was rebuilt in around 1320. The tower was re-built in the 15th century and the church underwent restoration in 1870.

== Parish status ==
The church is in a joint parish with

- St Andrew's Church, Great Fencote
- St Wilfrid's Church, Great Langton
- St Mary's Church, Kirkby Fleetham
- St John the Baptist's Church, Kirby Wiske
- St Radegund's Church, Scruton
- All Saints' Church, Yafforth

== Organ ==
The organ was built in 1889 by Forster and Andrews at a cost of £320 and was opened on 8 April 1890 by Robert Mack, organist of Catterick Parish Church. A specification of the organ can be found on the National Pipe Organ Register.

== See also ==
- Grade I listed buildings in Hambleton
- Listed buildings in Ainderby Steeple
