= St Radegund's Church, Scruton =

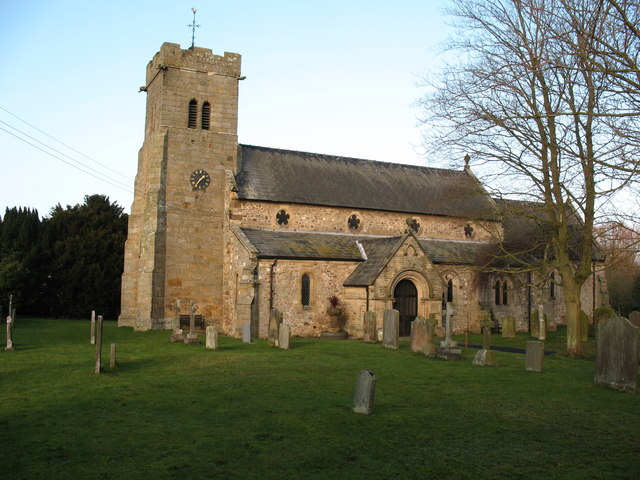
- St Radegund's Church, Scruton
- 54°19′39.51″N 1°32′22.01″W
- OS grid reference: SE 30036 92552
- Location: Scruton, North Yorkshire
- Country: England
- Denomination: Church of England

History
- Dedication: St Radegund

Architecture
- Heritage designation: Grade II* listed

Specifications
- Length: 83 feet (25 m)
- Width: 43 feet (13 m)

Administration
- Province: York
- Diocese: Leeds
- Archdeaconry: Richmond and Craven
- Deanery: Wensley
- Parish: Kirkby Fleetham with Langton on Swale and Scruton

St Radegund's Church, Scruton is a Grade II* listed parish church in the Church of England in Scruton, North Yorkshire.

== History ==
The church dates from the twelfth century, but was largely rebuilt in 1865 by George Fowler Jones. It consists of a nave, aisles, tower, porch and chancel with a Mortuary Chapel near the family vault of the Coore family. The restoration was funded by Henry and Augusta Coore, in memory of Henry Vane, 2nd Duke of Cleveland. The restoration included rebuilding the south aisle, east end, windows and clerestory. New roofs were erected throughout and new buttresses provided. New red and black tiles were laid in the nave, and the chancel was fitted with encaustic tiles.

It was re-opened by the Bishop of Ripon, Rt. Revd. Robert Biskersteth on 12 November 1865.

== Parish status ==
The church is in a joint parish with

- St Helen's Church, Ainderby Steeple
- St Andrew's Church, Great Fencote
- St Wilfrid's Church, Great Langton
- St Mary's Church, Kirkby Fleetham
- St John the Baptist's Church, Kirby Wiske
- All Saints' Church, Yafforth

== Organ ==
A small one-manual and pedal pipe organ was built in 1865 by Forster and Andrews. A specification of the organ can be found on the National Pipe Organ Register. In 1991 the organ was moved to Aduard Reformed Church in Holland.

== See also ==
- Grade II* listed churches in North Yorkshire (district)
- Listed buildings in Scruton
