= St Leonard's Church, Thornton-le-Street =

Church of St Leonard
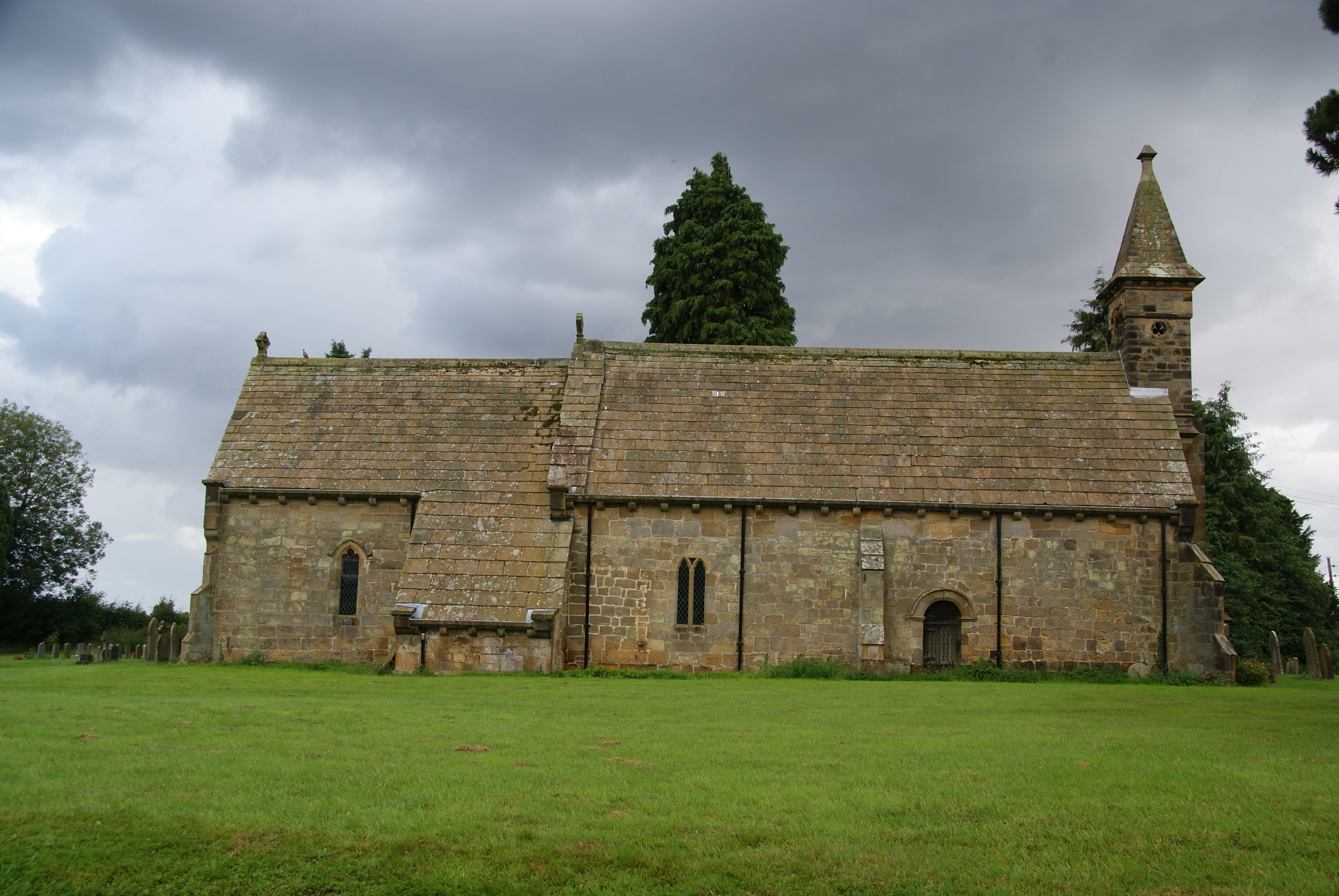
- The north side of St Leonard's Church
- Church of St Leonard
- 54.270072°N 1.365534°W
- OS grid reference: SE 41418 86232
- Location: Thornton-le-Street, North Yorkshire
- Country: England
- Denomination: Church of England

History
- Dedication: St Leonard

Architecture
- Heritage designation: Grade II*
- Designated: 20 June 1966

Administration
- Diocese: York
- Archdeaconry: Cleveland
- Deanery: Mowbray
- Parish: Thorntons and the Otteringtons

Clergy
- Vicar: The Revd Canon Stephen Treasure

St Leonard's Church is an Anglican church in the village of Thornton-le-Street, North Yorkshire, England. It is an active parish church in the Church of England's Diocese of York. The earliest part of the church dates to the 12th century and it was designated a Grade II* listed building on 20 June 1966.

The nave dates to the late 12th century and the chancel with its small vestry date to the 14th century. The church was extensively "restored" in the 19th century. The current east window was added in 1894 and was designed by Charles Eamer Kempe.

Currently, the St Leonard's Church is part of the Benefice of the Thorntons and the Otteringtons, with St Andrew's Church, South Otterington and St Michael and All Angels' Church, North Otterington. The benefice sits in the Deanery of Mowbray in the Archdeaconry of Cleveland of the Diocese of York.

== See also ==
- Grade II* listed buildings in North Yorkshire (district)
- Listed buildings in Thornton-le-Street

== Gallery ==
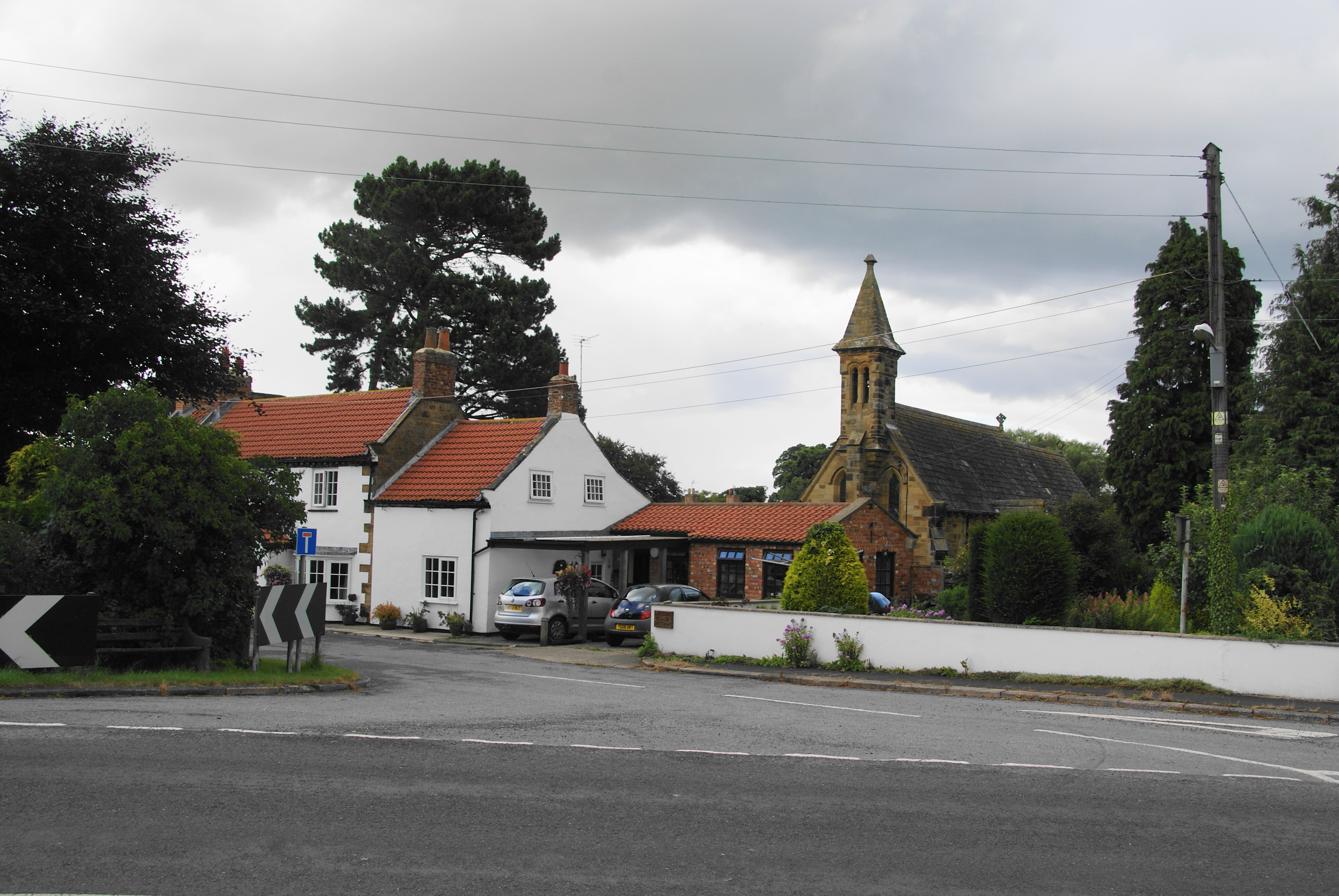
St Leonard's Church within the village

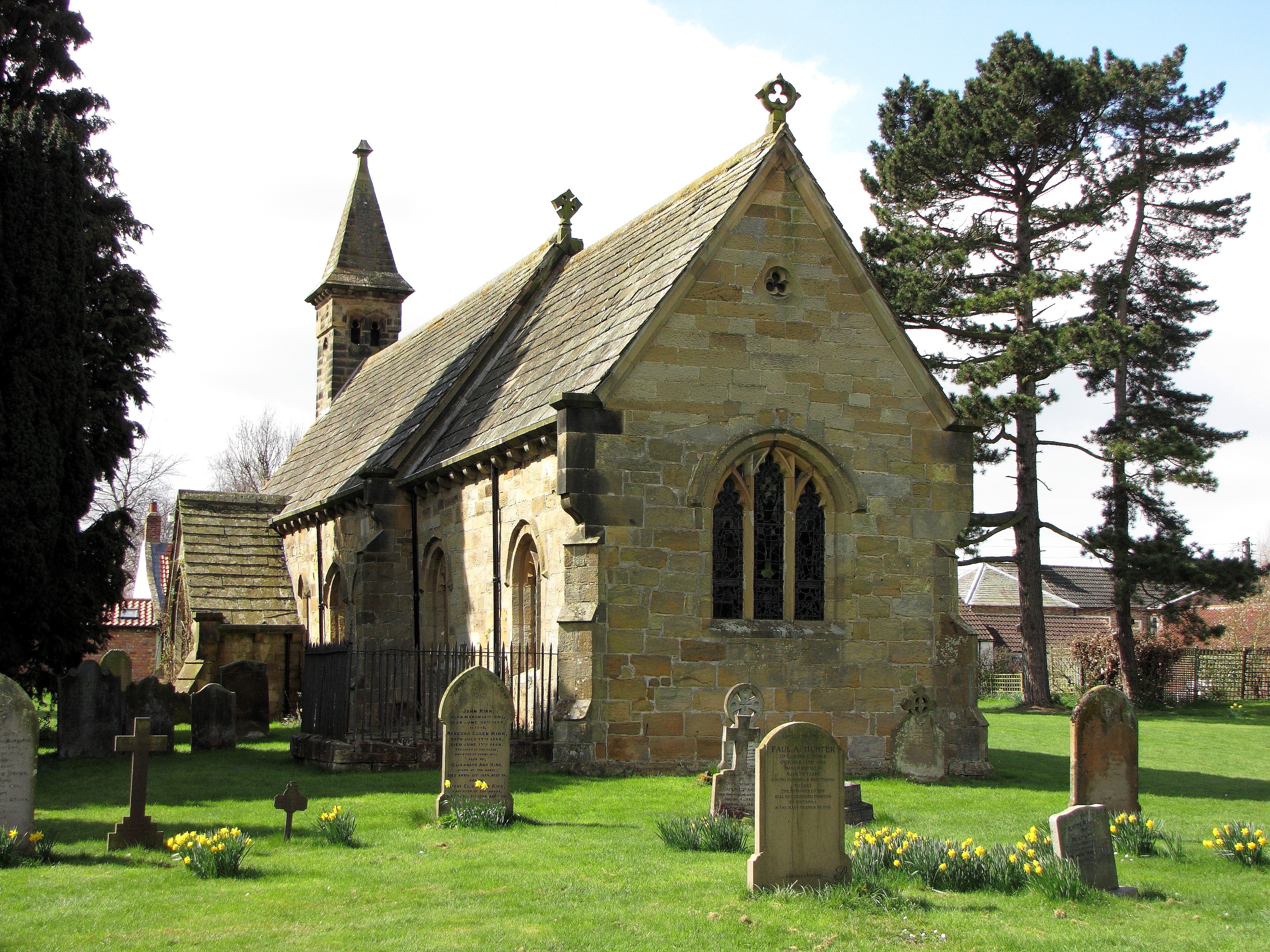
East end and graveyard

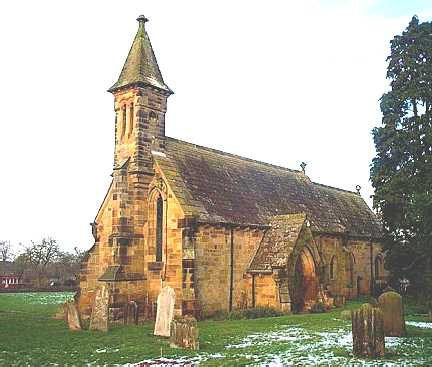
West end and graveyard
