= Listed buildings in Scruton =

Scruton is a civil parish in the county of North Yorkshire, England. It contains eight listed buildings that are recorded in the National Heritage List for England. Of these, one is listed at Grade II*, the middle of the three grades, and the others are at Grade II, the lowest grade. The parish contains the village of Scruton and the surrounding countryside. The most important listed building is a church, with is listed at Grade II*. All the others are at Grade II, and consist of houses, farmhouses and associated structures.

== Key ==
Grade	Criteria
II*	Particularly important buildings of more than special interest
II	Buildings of national importance and special interest

== Buildings ==
Name and location	Photograph	Date	Notes	Grade
St Radegund's Church, Scruton; 54.32766°N 1.53971°W		12th century	The church has been altered and extended through the centuries, including a restoration and partial rebuilding by G. Fowler Jones in 1865. The church is built in stone with stone slate roofs, and consists of a nave with a clerestory, north and south aisles, a south porch, a chancel and a west tower. The tower is Perpendicular, and has three stages, diagonal buttresses, a west window with a hood mould, clock faces, a chamfered band, paired bell openings with ogee heads, a moulded string course with corner gargoyles, embattled parapets and a pyramidal roof with a weathervane. The south doorway is Norman and has a round arch with roll moulding and rope motifs.	II*
Beech Cottage; 54.32616°N 1.53954°W	—	18th century	The house is rendered, and has a stepped eaves band and a pantile roof. There are two storeys and three bays. On the front is a flat-roofed porch, and the windows are horizontally sliding sashes.	II
The Old Rectory; 54.32713°N 1.53879°W	—	Mid-18th century	The house is rendered, and has dentilled eaves and a pantile roof. There are two storeys and attics, five bays and a rear wing. The central doorway has a Doric surround, a frieze and a segmental pediment. The windows are sashes, and there are three dormers.	II
Scruton Grange; 54.33078°N 1.55153°W	—	Late 18th century	A farmhouse in red brick, with an eaves band, and a tile roof with shaped kneelers and stone coping. There are two storeys and three bays, and an outshut on the left. In the centre is a gabled porch and a doorway with a fanlight, above it is a blind window, and the other windows are sashes with flat brick arches.	II
The Hollies; 54.32603°N 1.54008°W	—	Late 18th century	The house is in stone with a pantile roof. There are two storeys and three bays. The doorway is in the centre, the ground floor windows are sashes, on the upper floor they are casements, and all the openings have flat arches with voussoirs.	II
Scruton House; 54.31615°N 1.52859°W	—	Early 19th century	The house is in red brick with a hipped stone slate roof. There are two storeys and three bays, and a lower one-storey bay to the right. In the centre is a Doric porch, and the windows are sashes with flat brick arches. At the rear is an arched stair window.	II
Scruton House Stables; 54.31629°N 1.52826°W	—	Early 19th century	The stable block is in red brick, with a stepped dentiled cornice, and a hipped stone slate roof. There are two storeys and four bays, the bays divided by pilasters. The left two bays contain segmental-headed carriage arches, and elsewhere are sash windows with flat brick arches. The left return has a full height round-arched recess containing a segmental-arched window.	II
North block, Scruton House Cottage; 54.31640°N 1.52840°W		Early 19th century	A stable block partly converted into a house, it is in red brick with a hipped stone slate roof. There are two storeys and five bays, the central bay recessed, with a stepped dentiled cornice. This bay contains a segmental carriage arch converted into a window, and above it is a circular window. Towards the right is a doorway with a divided fanlight, and the windows are sashes. The right return has a full height round-arched recess containing a segmental-arched window.	II
