= Listed buildings in Newsham with Breckenbrough =

Newsham with Breckenbrough is a civil parish in the county of North Yorkshire, England. It contains four listed buildings that are recorded in the National Heritage List for England. Of these, two are listed at Grade II*, the middle of the three grades, and the others are at Grade II, the lowest grade. The parish contains the settlements of Newsham and Breckenbrough and the surrounding countryside. The listed buildings consist of the estate lodge of a demolished house, two buildings associated with it, and a farmhouse.

== Key ==
Grade	Criteria
II*	Particularly important buildings of more than special interest
II	Buildings of national importance and special interest

== Buildings ==
Name and location	Photograph	Date	Notes	Grade
Newsham Grange Farmhouse; 54.25713°N 1.42000°W	—	Late 18th century	The farmhouse is in red brick, with a dentilled eaves band, and a pantile roof with shaped kneelers and stone coping. There are two storeys and three bays, the left bay lower and recessed. The doorway has a fanlight, and the windows are sashes, those on the upper floor horizontally-sliding.	II
West Lodge, Thornton Stud; 54.25499°N 1.39744°W		Late 18th century	The lodge to Thornton Hall, now demolished, is in stone on the front, and in brick on the sides, with a hipped stone slate roof. There are two storeys and a front of one bay. The main front has a single storey, a plinth, a full-height canted bay window, a moulded band, a plain frieze, and a moulded cornice. In the returns are windows with flat brick arches.	II*
West Lodge gateway, Thornton Stud with walls, gate, railings and piers 54.25480°N 1.39764°W		Late 18th century	The gateway is in stone, and has a central semicircular carriage archway, with a moulded archivolt and an impost band, flanked by paired Tuscan columns with reeded capitals. Over the columns is a frieze with swags and oval paterae, in the centre is a panel with three swags, over which is a cornice and a blocking course. The arch is filled with a fan and gates in wrought iron. The arch is flanked by short walls, and iron railings, and at each end is a rusticated pier, with a plinth, a frieze with swags and urns, a cornice and stepped blocking course.	II*
Railings and gate piers south of west gateway to Thornton Stud; 54.25448°N 1.39813°W	—	Late 18th century	The two gate piers are in stone with a square plan. Each pier is rusticated, with a band, a frieze, a cornice and blocking course, and the base for an urn. The railings are in wrought iron, they are plain and sweep back in a quarter circle.	II
