= Scruton =

Village and civil parish in North Yorkshire, England

Coordinates: 54°19′33″N 1°32′29″W

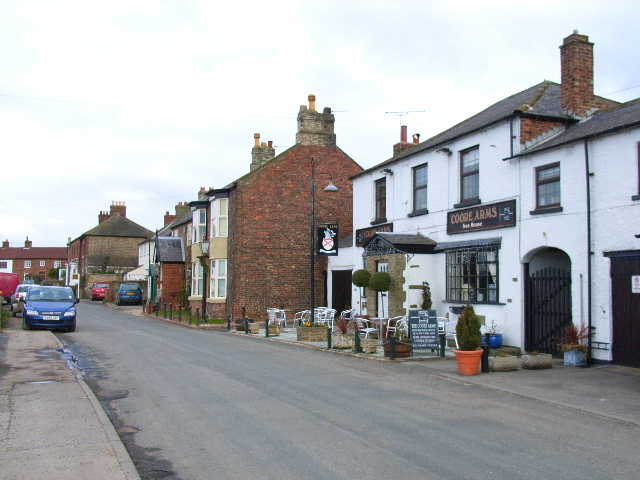
- Scruton's main street

- Location within North Yorkshire
- Population: 424 (2011 census)
- Unitary authority: North Yorkshire
- Ceremonial county: North Yorkshire
- Region: Yorkshire and the Humber
- Country: England
- Sovereign state: United Kingdom
- Post town: Northallerton
- Postcode district: DL7
- Police: North Yorkshire
- Fire: North Yorkshire
- Ambulance: Yorkshire

Scruton is a village and civil parish in North Yorkshire, England. It is 4 miles (6 km) west of Northallerton. According to the 2001 census the village had a population of 442, it decreased to 424 at the 2011 census.

From 1974 to 2023 it was part of the Hambleton District, it is now administered by the unitary North Yorkshire Council.

== History ==
The name Scruton derives from Old English and Old Norse meaning Scurfa's farm or Scurfa's settlement. Scurfa was believed to have been a Viking chieftain who lived in the area.

Scruton is a Thankful Village, one of very few English villages that lost no men in the First World War. The village is featured on Darren Hayman's album, Thankful Villages Volume 1.

In 1953, the last owner of the Scruton estate, Mrs Marion Evelyn Coore, died and the 1,100-acre (450 ha) estate including the public house, village shop, five farms and associated houses were put up for sale. The auction was held in the Golden Lion Hotel in Northallerton. Scruton Hall was bought by a timber company for the wood within the house and after a few years in decay, was demolished in 1956.

== Modern Scruton ==
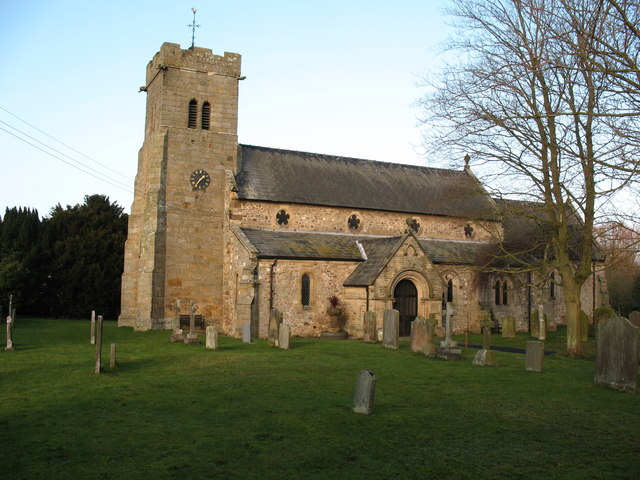
St Radegund's Church, Scruton

Amenities in Scruton include the village hall (the Coore Memorial Hall) and the Anglican St Radegund's Church which are all venues for village activities. The village's pub, the Coore Arms closed down in February 2026.

St Radegund's hosts Church of England services each week. It also provides a venue for concerts and hosts other occasional village events. The mediaeval church, restored by architect George Fowler Jones in 1865, is a grade II* listed building and one of only five churches in England dedicated to St Radegund.

The village green is maintained by the parish council, and is the venue for the annual village fete. Scruton Playing Field has a tennis court, children's play equipment and a football pitch that is home to Scruton Football Club. Adjacent to the playing field is Scruton Cricket Club.

An extensive network of public rights of way is maintained by the parish council with funding from North Yorkshire County Council and the support of local landowners.

Scruton has many other events in its calendar including the annual Safari Supper, bi-annual Open Gardens and Scarecrow Trail and an annual Harvest Walk.

=== Railway station ===
Scruton railway station closed down but in partnership with the heritage Wensleydale Railway and the Wensleydale Railway Trust, it reopened in spring 2014. A survey of the station in 2000 rated Scruton station as a uniquely well-preserved example of its type, now mostly lost in England.

== See also ==
- Listed buildings in Scruton
