= Kirby Wiske =

Village in North Yorkshire, England

Coordinates: 54°15′29″N 1°25′29″W

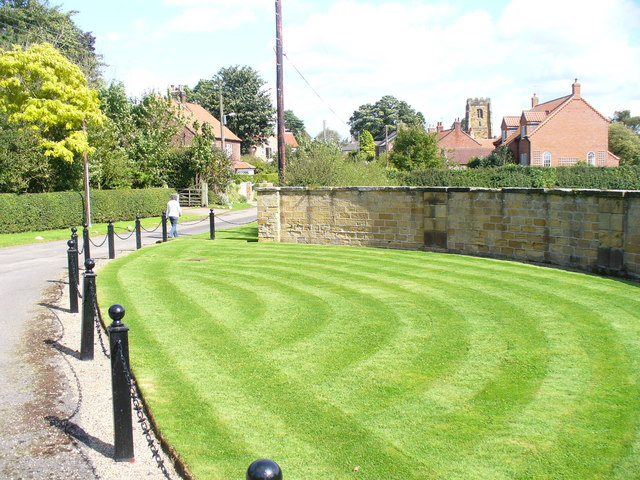
- Kirby Wiske from the west

- Location within North Yorkshire
- Population: 113 (2011 census)
- OS grid reference: SE376848
- Civil parish: Kirby Wiske
- Unitary authority: North Yorkshire
- Ceremonial county: North Yorkshire
- Region: Yorkshire and the Humber
- Country: England
- Sovereign state: United Kingdom
- Post town: Thirsk
- Postcode district: YO7
- Dialling code: 01845
- Police: North Yorkshire
- Fire: North Yorkshire
- Ambulance: Yorkshire
- UK Parliament: Thirsk and Malton

Kirby Wiske is an English village and civil parish in the county of North Yorkshire. It lies beside the River Wiske, about 4 miles (6.4 km) north-west of Thirsk.

== History ==
The village appears in the 1086 Domesday Book as Kirkebi in the Allerton Hundred. After the Norman invasion, Domesday states, the manor passed from Edwin, Earl of Mercia, to the Crown of England.

Anne of Denmark stayed with Thomas Lascelles of Brackenburgh on 10 June 1603, while on her way to London from Edinburgh, and travelled on to York.

== Governance ==
The village shares a parish council with Newsham with Breckenbrough. It lies within the Thirsk and Malton UK Parliament constituency. From 1974 to 2023 it was part of the Hambleton District, it is now administered by the unitary North Yorkshire Council.

== Geography ==
The nearest settlements are Maunby 1.9 miles (3.1 km) to the north-west; South Otterington 1.6 miles (2.6 km) to the north; Thornton-le-Street 2.5 miles (4.0 km) to the north-east and Sandhutton 1.8 miles (2.9 km) to the south. Maunby stands on the west bank of the River Wiske, which joins the River Swale to the south of the village. It is close to the A167 road.

The 1881 UK Census recorded a population of 223. The population of Kirkby Wiske in 2001 was 105 – 45 male, 60 female, 90 of them over the age of 16, of whom 61 were in employment. There were 48 dwellings, 29 of them detached. The population at the census of 2011 had risen to 131.

== Religion ==
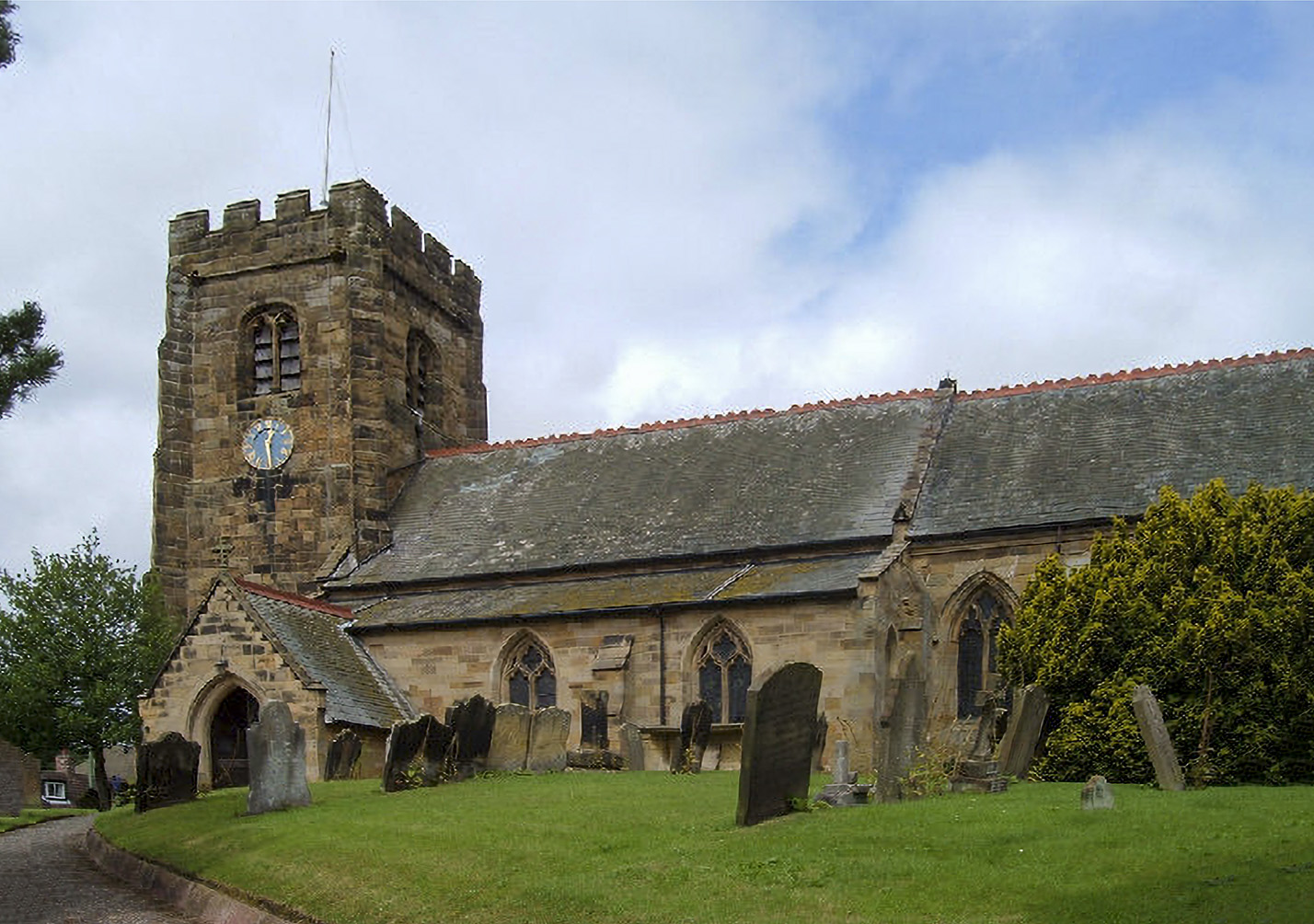
St John the Baptist's Church, Kirby Wiske

There is an Anglican parish church in the village, dedicated to St John the Baptist. The church is a Grade II* listed building, originally built in the 12th century on the site of an earlier Saxon church. Restoration and rebuilding of the present church took place in the 14th, 15th and 19th centuries.

The congregation today forms part of a joint parish of Lower Swale, along with seven other parishes. There is a service at Kirby Wiske church about once a month.

There was a Wesleyan Methodist chapel built in the village in 1825, but the building is no longer used as such. Nor are the premises of a Church of England school that opened in 1870.

== Listed buildings ==
In all there are eleven Grade II Listed Buildings in the area, including the bridge over the river. One of them, Sion Hill Hall, now houses the Birds of Prey and Conservation Centre, which keeps over 70 birds of prey and is run by Falconry UK Ltd.

== Notable residents ==
- Roger Ascham, born in Kirby Wiske in 1514 or 1515, was a scholar, educationalist and promoter of archery, who was Princess Elizabeth's tutor in Greek and Latin in 1548–1550 and served under the administrations of Edward VI, Mary I and Elizabeth I.
- Anthony Ascham or Askham, astronomer, astrologer, and brother of Roger, was born at Kirby Wiske in about 1517.
- William Palliser (1644–1726) was baptised in Kirby Wiske. He later became Archbishop of Cashel in the Church of Ireland.
- Christopher Bethell (1773–1859), Rector of Kirby Wiske in 1808–1830, became Bishop of Bangor, despite knowing no Welsh. His writings on religious matters include A General View of the Doctrine of Regeneration in Baptism (1821).
