= Listed buildings in Yafforth =

Yafforth is a civil parish in the county of North Yorkshire, England. It contains 13 listed buildings that are recorded in the National Heritage List for England. All the listed buildings are designated at Grade II, the lowest of the three grades, which is applied to "buildings of national importance and special interest". The parish contains the village of Yafforth and the surrounding countryside. Most of the listed buildings are houses, cottages and associated structures, farmhouses and farm buildings, and the others include a bridge, a bell frame and bell, and a church.

== Buildings ==
Name and location	Photograph	Date	Notes
The Old Hall; 54.34528°N 1.47104°W		1614	The house is in red brick with diapering, and has a pantile roof with oversailing eaves. There are two storeys and two bays. Each bay has a gable, between the gables is a smaller gable, and all have bargeboards and finials. On the front are large mullioned and transomed windows, one window has been infilled with a sash window, and the entrance is on the right return.
Little Danby Hall; 54.36051°N 1.47749°W		17th century	A farmhouse and stables that have been extended. They are in red brick with roofs of Welsh slate, stone slate and pantile. The main house has two storeys and three blocks. The left block, dating from the 19th century, has two bays and contains sash windows. The middle block, from the 18th century, has two bays, and a central doorway with Roman Doric pilasters, an architrave, a frieze and a cornice, and a pediment with a coat of arms in the tympanum. The right block, from the 19th century, contains a two-storey canted bay window. To the right is a 17th-century wing with two storeys and five bays, and further to the right is a stable block added in 1925.
Yafforth Bridge; 54.34448°N 1.46897°W		c. 1682 (probable)	The bridge, which has been altered, carries the B6271 road over the River Wiske. It is in stone, and consists of two segmental arches, one over the main stream, the other over a flood channel. On the downstream side, the main arch has a chamfered hood mould above voussoirs, a band and a long parapet ending in circular bollards. The upstream side dates from the 18th century, and both arches have archivolts and pilaster buttresses.
Ladyfield Farmhouse; 54.33377°N 1.49218°W	—	Mid-18th century	The farmhouse is in rendered red brick and has a tile roof. There are two storeys and three bays, and a lower bay to the right. The doorway is in the centre, the windows are sashes, and at the rear is a stair tower.
Yafforth Lodge; 54.34382°N 1.47576°W	—	Late 18th century	The farmhouse is in red brick, and has a Westmorland slate roof with shaped kneelers and stone coping. There are two storeys and three bays, and a single-storey outshut on the left. The doorway has an architrave and a fanlight, the windows on the main house are sashes with flat brick arches, and on the outshut is a horizontally sliding sash window.
Yafforth Grange; 54.34734°N 1.49389°W	—	Late 18th to early 19th century	A farmhouse in red brick, rendered on the front and sides, that has a tile roof with shaped kneelers and stone coping. There are two storeys and three bays, and a lower right wing. The central doorway has an architrave on a plinth, a fanlight, consoles and an open pediment. The ground floor windows are casements, and on the upper floor are sash windows in architraves on brackets, with keystones.
Stable with granary west of Yafforth Grange; 54.34734°N 1.49420°W	—	Late 18th to early 19th century	The building is in red brick, with an eaves band, a hipped pantile roof, and two storeys. The ground floor contains three round-headed doorways, and two two-light windows with flat brick arches. On the upper floor are two square openings with cambered brick arches, and on the right gable end are external steps.
Stables and hayloft north of Yafforth Grange; 54.34755°N 1.49393°W	—	Late 18th to early 19th century	The building is in red brick, with an eaves band, and a hipped Welsh slate roof. There are two storeys and three bays. The ground floor contains doorways of differing types, and on the upper floor are three square openings.
Threshing barn and round house northwest of Yafforth Grange; 54.34754°N 1.49450°W	—	Late 18th to early 19th century	The buildings are in red brick with a hipped pantile roof. The threshing barn has a large wagon door, and the round house has two bays and two square openings.
Bell frame with bell south of Ladyfield Farmhouse; 54.33371°N 1.49225°W	—	1810	The bell frame and bell are in cast and wrought iron. The frame has decorative ironwaork and a finial. The bell is hung from the top rail, and there is a ringing chain attached to the clapper.
Yafforth House; 54.34429°N 1.47320°W	—	Early 19th century	The house is in red brick, with a floor band, a cornice, oversailing eaves, and a hipped slate roof. There are two storeys and five bays, the outer bays lower and recessed. In the centre is a Roman Doric porch with a frieze, a cornice and a blocking course, and a doorway with a fanlight. The windows are sashes with flat brick arches.
Wall and gate piers, Yafforth House; 54.34427°N 1.47266°W	—	Early 19th century	At the entrance to the drive are two round stone gate piers with bands and hemispherical tops. The stone wall enclosing the front garden has coping, and is ramped up at the ends.
All Saints' Church; 54.34482°N 1.47184°W		1870	The church was rebuilt in Early English style, incorporating earlier material. It is in stone with slate roofs, and consists of a nave, a south porch, a chancel and a west tower. The tower has three stages, angle buttresses, a blank circular reveal, two-light bell openings with hood moulds, a string course and a parapet. On the tower is a reset Norman window, and there is also Norman material in the south doorway.
