= Listed buildings in Ainderby Steeple =

Ainderby Steeple is a civil parish in the county of North Yorkshire, England. It contains four listed buildings that are recorded in the National Heritage List for England. Of these, one is listed at Grade I, the highest of the three grades, and the others are at Grade II, the lowest grade. The parish contains the village of Ainderby Steeple and the surrounding area. All the listed buildings are in the village, and consist of a church, two houses, and a milepost.

== Key ==
Grade	Criteria
I	Buildings of exceptional interest, sometimes considered to be internationally important
II	Buildings of national importance and special interest

== Buildings ==
Name and location	Photograph	Date	Notes	Grade
St Helen's Church; 54.32339°N 1.48715°W		14th century	The church has been altered and extended through the centuries, including a Victorian restoration in 1868–69. It is built in stone with roofs of lead and slate, and consists of a nave with a clerestory, north and south aisles, a south porch, a chancel with a north vestry, and a west tower clasped by the aisles. The tower has three stages, diagonal buttresses, a three-light arched west window with a hood mould, clock faces on the south and west sides, two-light bell openings with hood moulds, a band and an embattled parapet.	I
5 Northallerton Road; 54.32301°N 1.48708°W		Early 19th century	A house in red brick with a dentilled eaves band, and a tile roof with a stone coped gable and a shaped kneeler on the left. There are two storeys and three bays. Steps lead up to a doorway in the right bay, in the left bay is an elliptical-arched carriage entrance, the tympanum filled with brick, and the windows are sashes with flat brick arches.	II
8 Northallerton Road; 54.32302°N 1.48721°W		Early 19th century	The house is in red brick with a dentilled eaves band and a pantile roof. There are two storeys and three bays. Steps lead up to the central doorway that has a flat brick arch. Above the doorway is a blind window, and the other windows are sashes with flat brick arches.	II
Milepost; 54.32437°N 1.48897°W		Late 19th century	The milepost on the north side of Main Street is in cast iron with a triangular section and a rounded top. The top is inscribed "North Riding of Yorkshire", on the left side is the distance to Northallerton, and on the right side the distances to Bedale and to Hawes.	II
