= Sion Hill Hall =

Building in Kirby Wiske, North Yorkshire, England

Coordinates: 54°15′15″N 1°25′42″W

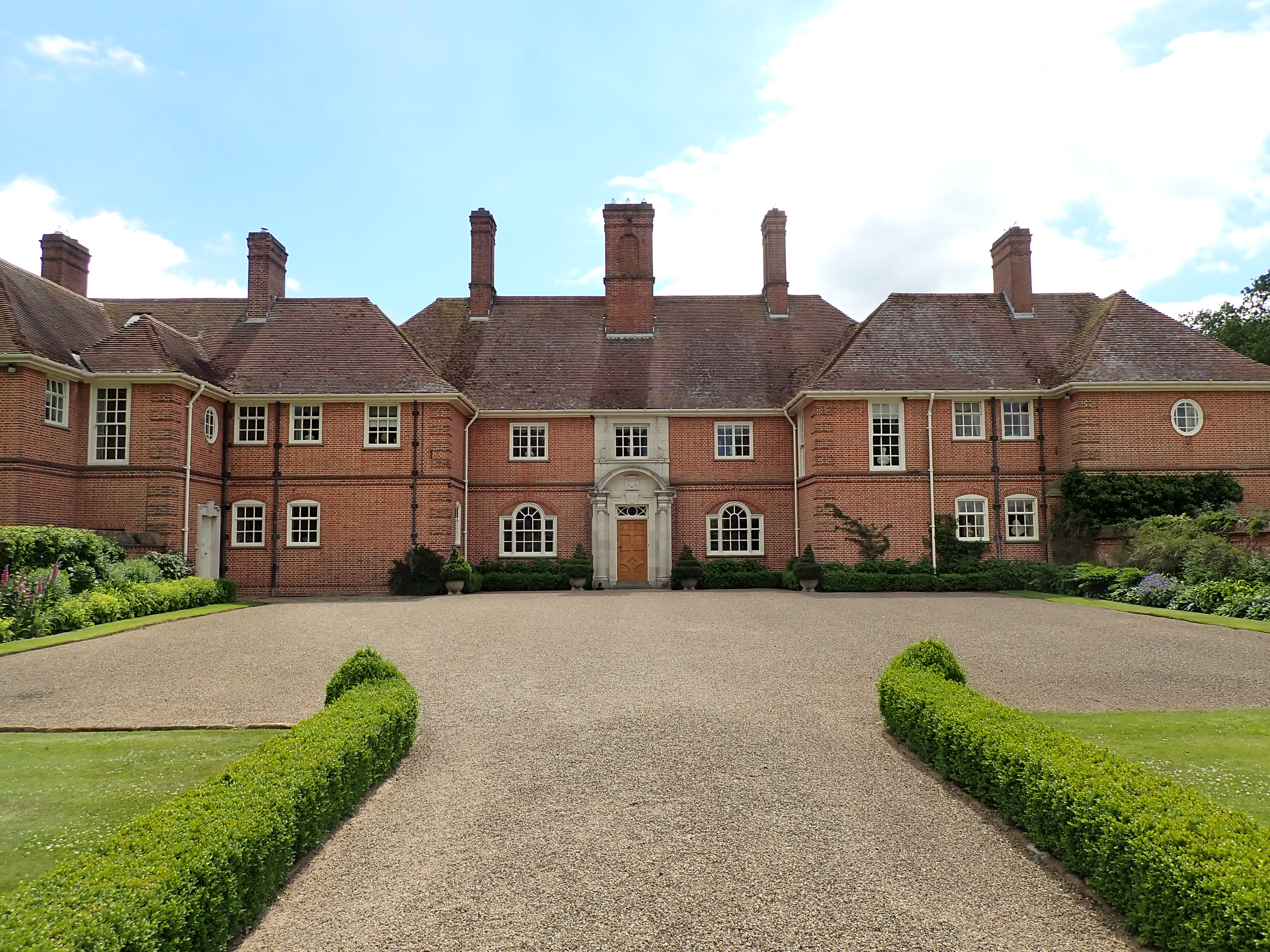
The building, in 2021

Sion Hill Hall is a historic building in Kirby Wiske, a village in North Yorkshire, in England.

The hall is built on the site of the village's manor house. The building was commissioned by Percy Stancliffe, designed by Walter Brierley, and was completed in 1913. It is in the neo-Georgian style, and was inspired by Edwin Lutyens' Middlefield House. Historic England describe it as being "generally regarded as one of Brierley's most successful country houses". It was grade II* listed in 1987.

The house is built of handmade red brick, with Portland stone dressings, quoins, a floor band, and hipped tile roofs with oversailing eaves. It has two storeys, a central range of three bays, and projecting wings with six bays on the left and four on the right, and a four-bay service wing on the left. The middle bay of the central range is in Portland stone, and contains an Ionic doorcase, and a doorway with an architrave, a fanlight, keystones, and an open round-headed pediment containing the date, and above it is a window with an architrave, scrolled at the bottom. The doorway is flanked by Venetian windows in segmental arches, and most of the other windows are sashes. The garden front has twelve bays, and contains four French windows. The attached courtyard wall is in brick with stone coping and wooden railings, and in the centre are brick gate piers with stone cornices and ball finials. Inside, many of the rooms have 18th-century fireplaces, brought from the former manor house.

The grade II-listed lodge is contemporary with the house, and was also designed by Brierley. It is built of red brick, with a dentilled and moulded floor band, and a swept pantile roof. There is one storey and an attic, and two bays. In the centre is a gabled porch on timber columns. It is flanked by horizontally-sliding sash windows, and in the returns are casement windows.

The hall has five acres of gardens, which include large stone sculptures moved from the stables at Fountains Abbey. The gardens were restored in the early 21st century, to include a parterre, Long Walk, woodland Lower Walk, kitchen garden and rose garden.

== See also ==
- Grade II* listed buildings in North Yorkshire (district)
- Listed buildings in Kirby Wiske
