= Listed buildings in Thornton-le-Moor =

Thornton-le-Moor is a civil parish in the county of North Yorkshire, England. It contains six listed buildings that are recorded in the National Heritage List for England. All the listed buildings are designated at Grade II, the lowest of the three grades, which is applied to "buildings of national importance and special interest". The parish contains the village of Thornton-le-Moor and the surrounding countryside. The listed buildings consist of houses and associated structures in the village, and a farmhouse in the countryside to the north of the village.

== Buildings ==
Name and location	Photograph	Date	Notes
Ivy House and wall 54.28781°N 1.39768°W	—	Late 18th century	The house is in red brick with a dentilled eaves band and a tile roof. There are two storeys and four bays. The second bay projects and contains a doorway with pilasters, a fanlight, consoles and a frieze. The windows are sashes with flat brick arches. On the right is a single-storey outshut in front of which is a tall ramped wall with stone coping.
Laureldene; 54.28734°N 1.40191°W	—	Late 18th century	The house is in red brick on a plinth, with stone dressings, sill bands, a moulded stone cornice, and a coped stone slate roof. There are two storeys and five bays. The central doorway has a moulded architrave on plinths, a fanlight with radiating glazing bars, a frieze with paterae, and a dentilled cornice. The windows are sashes with flat brick arches.
Garden wall, Laureldene; 54.28722°N 1.40180°W	—	Late 18th century	The wall along the front of the garden is in stone, it is coped, and ends in small piers with cornices and blocking courses. The side walls are in brick.
Thornton House Farmhouse; 54.30325°N 1.41394°W	—	Late 18th century	The farmhouse is in red brick with an eaves band and a pantile roof. There are two storeys and three bays, and a lower two-storey one-bay wing on the right. The central doorway has a fanlight, and the windows are sashes, one window on the wing horizontally sliding. All the openings have flat brick arches, and above the upper floor windows are blind square panels.
Brewery House; 54.28808°N 1.39916°W	—	Early 19th century	The house is in red brick, and has a Welsh slate roof with stone coping and shaped kneelers. There are two storeys and four bays. The doorway has Doric pilasters, a fanlight, and an open pediment, and the windows are sashes with flat brick arches.
Gate piers and walls, Brewery House; 54.28784°N 1.39908°W	—	Mid to late 19th century	The entrance to the drive is flanked by rusticated stone piers on chamfered plinths, with entablatures and blocking courses. Each pair is connected by a low curved wall. The inner piers each has a Greek key motif under the entablature, and a large ball finial.
