= Listed buildings in Thornton-le-Street =

Thornton-le-Moor is a civil parish in the county of North Yorkshire, England. It contains ten listed buildings that are recorded in the National Heritage List for England. Of these, one is listed at Grade II*, the middle of the three grades, and the others are at Grade II, the lowest grade. The parish contains the village of Thornton-le-Street and the surrounding countryside. The listed buildings include structures associated with the demolished Thornton Hall, a church and table tombs in the churchyard, houses and farmhouses, and a watermill and mill house.

== Key ==
Grade	Criteria
II*	Particularly important buildings of more than special interest
II	Buildings of national importance and special interest

== Buildings ==
Name and location	Photograph	Date	Notes	Grade
St Leonard's Church; 54.27012°N 1.36545°W		12th century	The church has been altered and extended through the centuries, including a restoration in 1855. It is built in stone with a stone slate roof, and consists of a nave, a south porch and a chancel with a small vestry. At the west end is a square bell turret with lancet bell openings and hood moulds, a cornice on corbels, and a tail pyramidal stone roof with a finial. The north doorway is Norman, and has a round arch, a chamfered surround, and a moulded impost and hood on the right.	II*
Calvis Hall; 54.25462°N 1.35660°W	—	17th century	The front of the farmhouse is in brick, with a floor band and an eaves band, two storeys and three bays. The rear is older, it is in stone, and has two storeys and an attic, and an L-shaped plan. The roof is pantiled, with stone copings and shaped kneelers. The front has a central doorway with pilasters, a frieze, consoles and a cornice. The ground floor windows are casements, and on the upper floor they are sashes.	II
Mill house and watermill 54.27275°N 1.36763°W		17th century	The watermill and attached house are in red brick and stone, and have pantile roofs with stone coped gables and kneelers. They form a V-shaped plan, with the mill as the northeast range. There are various openings, some with chamfered surrounds, and the windows are a mix of casements and horizontally sliding sashes. Inside the mill is an iron and wood waterwheel.	II
The Old Hall; 54.27316°N 1.37168°W	—	17th century	The house, which has an earlier timber framed core, is in stone, with quoins, and a pantile roof with coped gables. There are two storeys and an L-shaped plan, with a range of four bays, and a gabled cross-wing on the right. The doorway has a fanlight, and the windows are casements.	II
Ford Cottage and Chesters; 54.27056°N 1.36537°W	—	Early 18th century	A vicarage, later divided into two houses, in stone with a tile roof, shaped kneelers and stone coping. There are two storeys and four bays. On the front are two doorways, the right bay contains horizontally sliding sash windows, and the other windows are casements.	II
Table tomb south of the west end of St Leonard's Church; 54.26992°N 1.36556°W	—	Early 18th century	The table tomb is in stone and has a rectangular plan. It consists of a slab with moulded edges on six shaped baluster legs.	II
Table tomb south of the nave of St Leonard's Church; 54.26997°N 1.36530°W	—	Early 18th century	The table tomb is in stone and has a rectangular plan. It consists of a slab with moulded edges on six shaped baluster legs.	II
Beal House; 54.27376°N 1.39210°W		Late 18th century	The farmhouse is in red brick, with a moulded stone cornice, and a hipped slate roof. There are three storeys and three bays. Steps lead up to the central doorway that has a moulded architrave and a three-pane fanlight. The windows are sashes with flat brick arches and keystones.	II
Thornton Stud; 54.26544°N 1.38718°W		Late 18th century	The former stables of Thornton Hall, now demolished, they are in red brick with stone dressings, a stone slate roof and two storeys, and they form a square plan. The main front has a floor band, a moulded eaves band, and a hipped roof. There are nine bays, the middle three bays projecting under a moulded pediment with a clock. They contain a full-height stepped round-arched carriage entrance flanked by blind round-arched openings. The outer bays contain round-headed arches, sash windows, square louvred openings, and circular windows. On the ridge are ventilation louvres.	II
East Lodges, Thornton Stud; 54.27154°N 1.37174°W		Late 18th century	The lodges flanking the entrance of the drive to Thornton Hall, now demolished, are in stone, rendered at the rear, with Welsh slate roofs. Each lodge has two storeys and one bay. On the front facing the road is a Venetian window, with a swagged frieze, a cornice and an archivolt, set in a round-arched recess with an impost band and voussoirs. Above is a reeded eaves frieze with paterae, and a pediment. The fronts facing the drive have a central doorway with an architrave, a swagged frieze, and a cornice on consoles, and above it is a round window with an architrave. These are set in a round-arched recess with an impost band and voussoirs.	II
