= All Saints' Church, Yafforth =

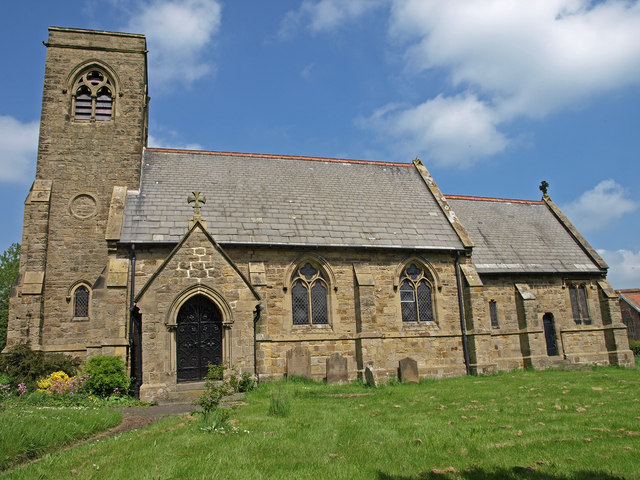
- All Saints' Church, Yafforth
- All Saints' Church, Yafforth
- 54°20′41.6″N 1°28′17.66″W
- OS grid reference: SE 34434 94489
- Location: Yafforth, North Yorkshire
- Country: England
- Denomination: Church of England

History
- Dedication: All Saints

Architecture
- Heritage designation: Grade II Listed

Administration
- Province: York
- Diocese: Leeds
- Archdeaconry: Richmond and Craven
- Deanery: Wensley
- Parish: Ainderby Steeple with Yafforth and Kirby Wiske with Maunby

All Saints' Church, Yafforth, is a Grade II listed parish church in the Church of England in Yafforth, North Yorkshire.

== History ==
The church dates from the twelfth century but was almost completely rebuilt in 1870 to designs by the architect James Pigott Pritchett of Darlington. A new east window was provided and designed by Clayton and Bell.

The rebuilt church was consecrated on 11 August 1870.

== Parish status ==
The church is in a joint parish with

- St Helen's Church, Ainderby Steeple
- St Andrew's Church, Great Fencote
- St Wilfrid's Church, Great Langton
- St John the Baptist's Church, Kirby Wiske
- St Mary's Church, Kirkby Fleetham
- St Radegund's Church, Scruton

== See also ==
- Listed buildings in Yafforth
