= Thornton-le-Moor =

Village and civil parish in North Yorkshire, England

Coordinates: 54.28733°N 1.40246°W

- Location within North Yorkshire
- Population: 425 (Including 2011 census)
- OS grid reference: SE389881
  - London: 195 mi (314 km) S
- Unitary authority: North Yorkshire
- Ceremonial county: North Yorkshire
- Region: Yorkshire and the Humber
- Country: England
- Sovereign state: United Kingdom
- Post town: NORTHALLERTON
- Postcode district: DL7
- Police: North Yorkshire
- Fire: North Yorkshire
- Ambulance: Yorkshire

Thornton-le-Moor is a village and civil parish in the county of North Yorkshire, England, situated equidistantly from the towns of Thirsk and Northallerton.

== History ==
The Romans built two roads from a camp to the south at Thornton-le-Street. The modern A168 roughly follows the route of one road towards Northallerton before it headed to a fort at Cataractonium (Catterick).

The village name means the "thorn-tree settlement on the moor" derived from the Old English, þorn meaning a hawthorn tree, tūn, a farmstead and mōr, marsh or barren upland. Recorded as Torentun in the 11th century and Thornton in Mora or Thornton super Moram from the 13th to the 15th centuries, the village was probably held before the Norman Conquest of England by Edmund but by 1086 was recorded in the Domesday Book as belonging to Robert Malet. The manor consisted of five carucates. It was divided into three fees. In the late-13th century two carucates belonged to the barony of Greystock. Another part consisting of 2½ carucates was part of the Honour of Eye held of the Earl of Cornwall in the late-13th century who before 1312 granted nine oxgangs of land to Fountains Abbey. The third holding belonged to Thomas de Otterington in 1300.

Before 1657, the "way over Purgatory by Thief Hole was in want of repair". Purgatory, another part of the parish, east of the A168 road was the location of a messuage and farm that belonged to the see of Durham in 1739, and after 1803, a toll bar on the Yarm to Thirsk turnpike road.

In Victorian times a domestic weaving industry flourished in the village but agriculture was the main occupation. The North Eastern Railway and brewing provided other sources of employment. Brewing started the mid-18th century when the Black Swan Inn was purchased by William Sadler who started a brewery. It remained in the Sadler family for more than 100 years until it passed to Robert Dennison, who willed it to Messrs Richardson, Carter and Armitage. They sold the brewery to Newsome Baxter in 1851. By then it had relocated to a site behind Brewery House.

The Victorian primary school opened in 1860 and closed in 1993, when it merged with a local school in Newby Wiske and a new school opened in South Otterington.

== Governance ==
Historically Thornton-le-Moor was a township in the parish of North Otterington in the wapentake of Birdforth in the North Riding of Yorkshire and after 1837, in the Thirsk Poor Law Union.

After the passing of the Local Government Act 1972, from 1 April 1974, Thornton-le-Moor was part of the Hambleton District of North Yorkshire. It is now administered by the unitary North Yorkshire Council.

== Geography ==
The village is at the foot of the ridge that divides the drainage basins of the River Wiske and the Cod Beck. It is on the minor road from South Otterington to the A168 between Thirsk and Northallerton about a mile south of Thornton-le-Beans. Another lane into the village leaves the A168 at Thief Hole. Otterington railway station on the line from York to Newcastle upon Tyne served the village between 1841 and 1958.

The parish is largely agricultural, in the 19th century 1,395 acres were under cultivation. The soil is light and the underlying geology is Keuper marl.

=== Population change ===
Population growth in Thornton le Moor 1881–1961
Year	1881	1891	1901	1911	1921	1931	1951	1961
Population	335	392	323	285	251	246	294	297
Thornton le Moor CP/Tn

== Religion ==
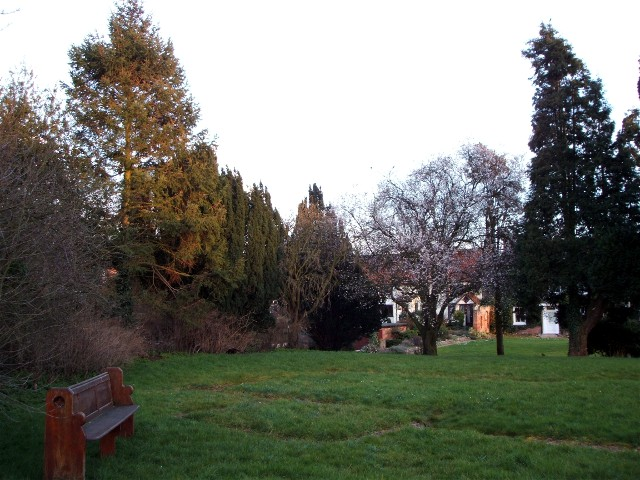
The site of St Barnabas' Church

Thornton-le-Moor was in the parish of North Otterington which had a church but no village. The village is connected to St Michael's Church in North Otterington by Endican Lane which joins the old corpse road from Thornton-le-Beans. An ancient chapel in Thornton-le-Moor was used as a school and place of worship for Nonconformists before it was demolished.

St Barnabus's Church, constructed in the late-13th-century style on the site of the ancient chapel. was built in 1868. Built of stone with a slate roof, it had a four-bay nave, quire, south porch and north vestry. It had a traceried east window and the gabled bellcote contained two bells.

When completed, the new church became the parish church and St Michael's Church at North Otterington became a chapel of ease. St Barnabas's Church was demolished in 1987 after its partial collapse in the previous year. The churchyard is still maintained.

== Amenities ==
Amenities comprise The Black Swan public house and a postbox. The village post office and shop closed in the 1970s. The village cricket club formed in the 1950s and has 2 Saturday teams playing in the Nidderdale Amateur Cricket League from April to September, as well as a team in the Northallerton and District Evening League and Tuesday and Thursday evenings.

== See also ==
- Listed buildings in Thornton-le-Moor
