= Thornton-le-Street =

Village and civil parish in North Yorkshire, England

Coordinates: 54°16′13″N 1°21′58″W

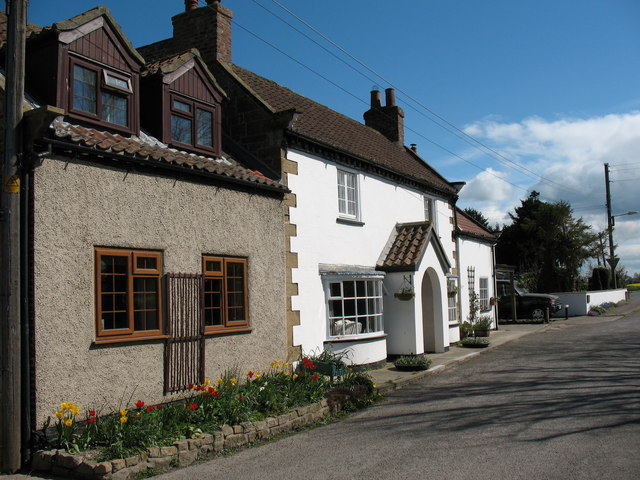
- Former public house at Thornton-le-Street

- Location within North Yorkshire
- Population: 90 (NYCC)
- OS grid reference: SE413862
- Unitary authority: North Yorkshire
- Ceremonial county: North Yorkshire
- Region: Yorkshire and the Humber
- Country: England
- Sovereign state: United Kingdom
- Post town: THIRSK
- Postcode district: YO7
- Police: North Yorkshire
- Fire: North Yorkshire
- Ambulance: Yorkshire
- UK Parliament: Thirsk and Malton

Thornton-le-Street is a village and parochial and civil parish in the county of North Yorkshire, England. It is part of the civil parish of Thornton-le-Moor and Thornton-le-Street for District purposes. As the population remained less 100 at the 2011 Census details are included in the civil parish of Thornton-le-Moor. In 2015, North Yorkshire County Council estimated the population to have been 90.

Thornton-le-Street is situated about 3 miles (4.8 km) north of Thirsk and about 5.3 miles (8.5 km) south-east of the county town of Northallerton. The whole village is within the site of the old medieval village and designated and Ancient Monument under the terms of the Ancient Monuments and Archaeological Areas Act 1979. It is located between the west bank of the Cod Beck and the A168 road between Thirsk and Northallerton.

== History ==
The village is mentioned in the Domesday Book as Torentun in the Allerton hundred. The manor was the possession of Earl Edwin at the time of the Norman invasion. Afterwards it passed to the Crown who granted it to the manor of Northallerton whose lord was the Bishop of Durham. In the 13th and 14th centuries, the main landowners were the de Wassand and de Wadesley families. In the 16th century the line of descent had altered through marriage to the Everinghams and then by sale to the Talbots who held the title to the manor until 1793. It was briefly the possession of Samuel Crompton whose daughter inherited the manor where it passed down her husband, Alan Frederick Cathcart, 3rd Earl Cathcart’s, line of descent.

The name is derived from Old English words þorn and tūn and the Anglian word, strēt, joined together by the particle le to give the meaning of Thorn tree farm on a Roman road. The suffix of le-street was used to distinguish it from other Thorntons in the area.

== Governance ==
The village is within the Thirsk and Malton UK Parliament constituency. From 1974 to 2023 it was part of the Hambleton District, it is now administered by the unitary North Yorkshire Council.

== Geography ==
The village is located between the west bank of the Cod Beck and the A168 road between Thirsk and Northallerton. Within a radius of 2.5 miles (4 km) can be found the settlements of Thornton-le-Moor, Borrowby, Knayton, Upsall, South Kilvington, Newsham and South Otterington. The mean elevation in the village is 154 feet (47 m).

The abandoned medieval village, fishponds and manorial site complete with a moat, are now little more than earthwork banks, but with well preserved below-ground remains. The old route of the main street which follows that of the old Roman road can be traced from the end of the existing main street running towards the eastern side of Old Hall.

== Religion ==
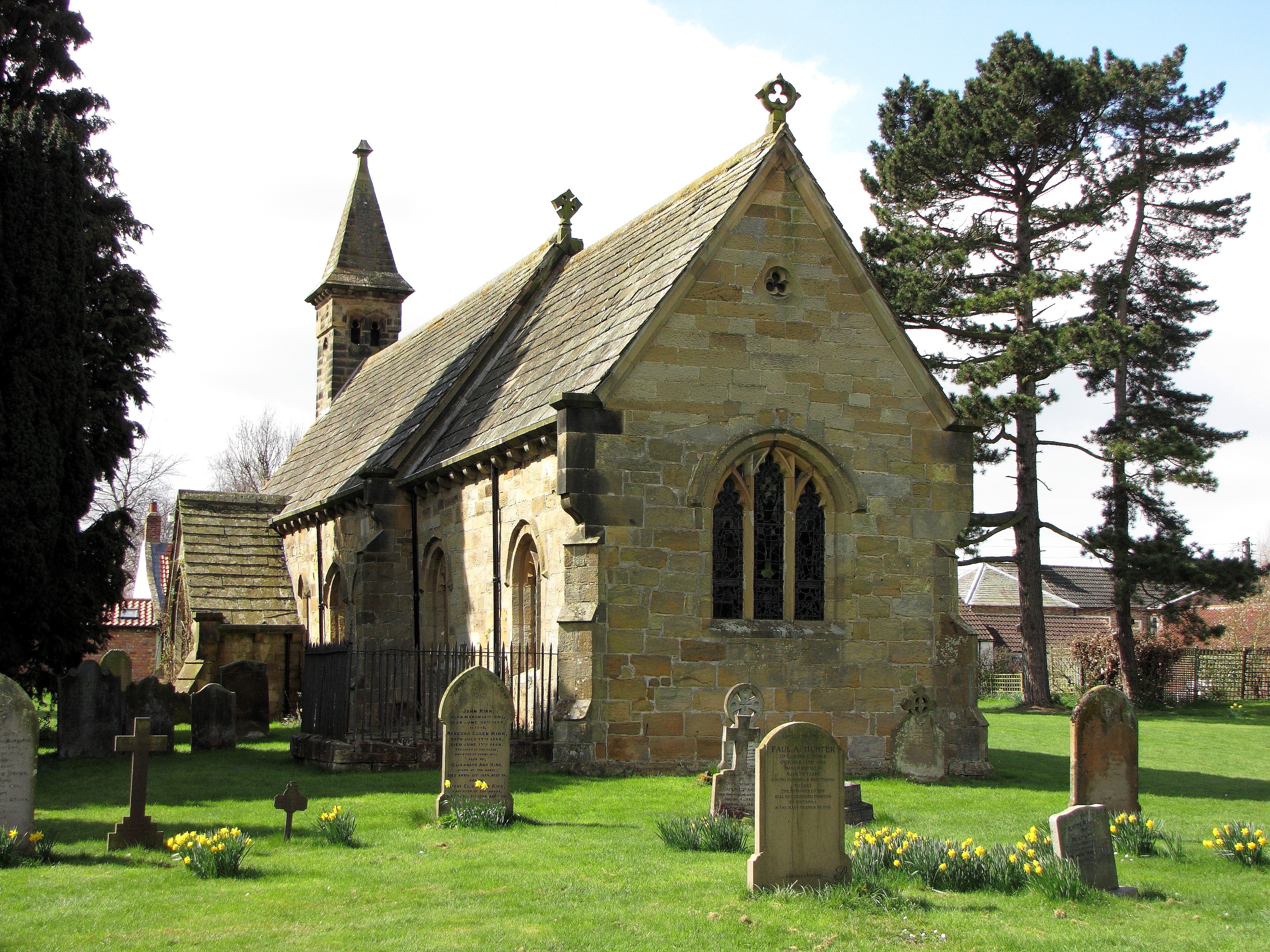
St Leonard's Church, Thornton-le-Street

The village church is dedicated to St Leonard and is a grade II* listed building. The oldest parts indicate it was built in the 12th century with modifications in the 14th and 19th centuries.

== See also ==
- Listed buildings in Thornton-le-Street
