= Yafforth =

Village and civil parish in North Yorkshire, England

Coordinates: 54°20′41″N 1°28′25″W

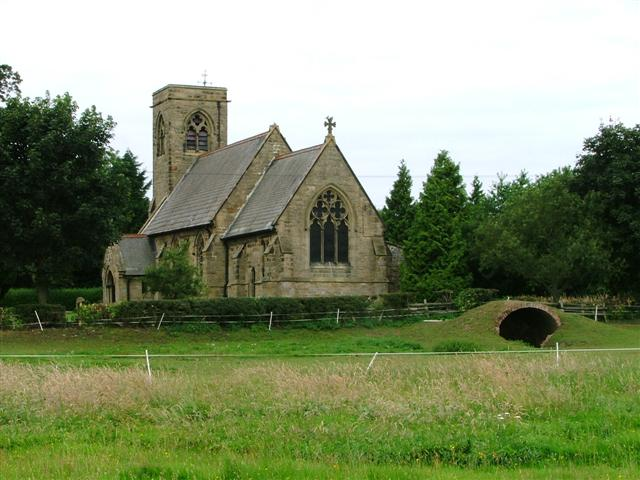
- All Saints' Church

- Location within North Yorkshire
- Population: 174 (2011 census)
- OS grid reference: SE342945
- Civil parish: Yafforth
- Unitary authority: North Yorkshire
- Ceremonial county: North Yorkshire
- Region: Yorkshire and the Humber
- Country: England
- Sovereign state: United Kingdom
- Post town: NORTHALLERTON
- Postcode district: DL7
- Dialling code: 01609
- Police: North Yorkshire
- Fire: North Yorkshire
- Ambulance: Yorkshire
- UK Parliament: Richmond and Northallerton

Yafforth is a village and civil parish in North Yorkshire, England about 1 mile (1.6 km) west of Northallerton. The village lies on the B6271 road between Northallerton and the village of Scorton. The parish had a population of 174 in the 2011 census.

The River Wiske passes to the east of the village. Romanby Golf Course is situated between Yafforth and the village of Romanby.

== History ==
It is thought that the name Yafforth is derived from Ea-ford, meaning the ford in the river.

Yafforth was mentioned in the Domesday Book of 1086 as a berewick in the royal manor of Northallerton. To the north of the village lies a notable mound called Howe Hill, It is a Norman motte probably built during the reign of King Stephen. Today it still stands 15 feet (4.6 m) high and retains some of its ditch and the counter scarp bank. Its position suggests that it was built to defend the River Wiske. Records suggest that it was disused by 1198.

Yafforth was historically a manor in the ancient parish of Danby Wiske. Yafforth All Saints' Church was built in 1208 and extensively rebuilt in 1870. It was a chapel of ease to Danby Wiske. Yafforth also had a Methodist chapel which closed in 1966.

Yafforth became a separate civil parish in 1866. From 1974 to 2023 it was part of the Hambleton District, it is now administered by the unitary North Yorkshire Council.

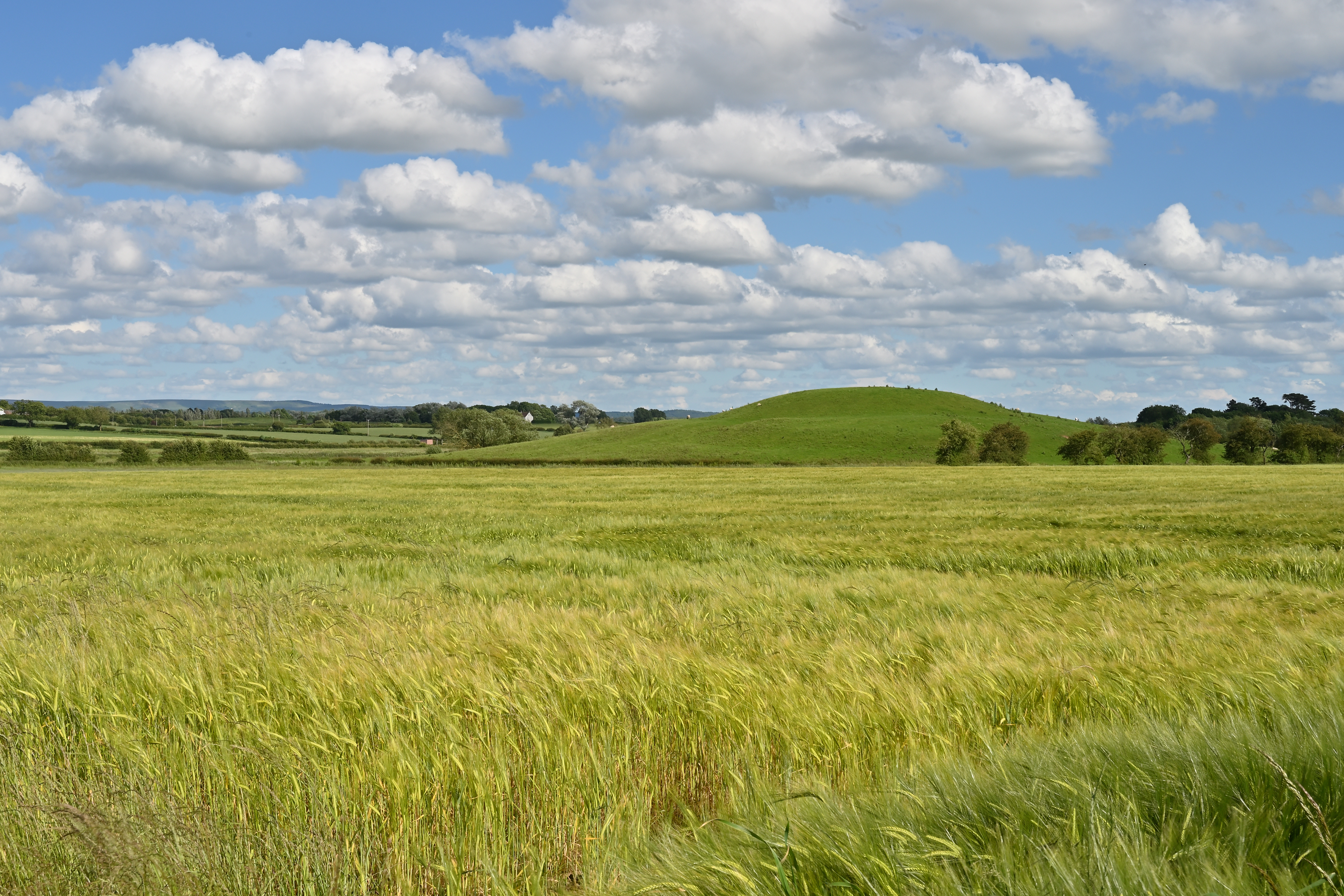
Howe Hill (a Norman motte) at Yafforth

Yafforth school opened in 1868 and closed in 1952, the school building still stands in the middle of the village.

Yafforth once had two shops, three brickyards, and a pub. The pub was named after a horse named Reveller, winner of the 1818 St Leger Stakes classic at Doncaster. The pub closed in the late 1990s and is now a residential property. The only reminder of its name is the Reveller Mews across the road.

== See also ==
- Listed buildings in Yafforth
