= Nunnington Hall =

Grade I listed house in North Yorkshire, England

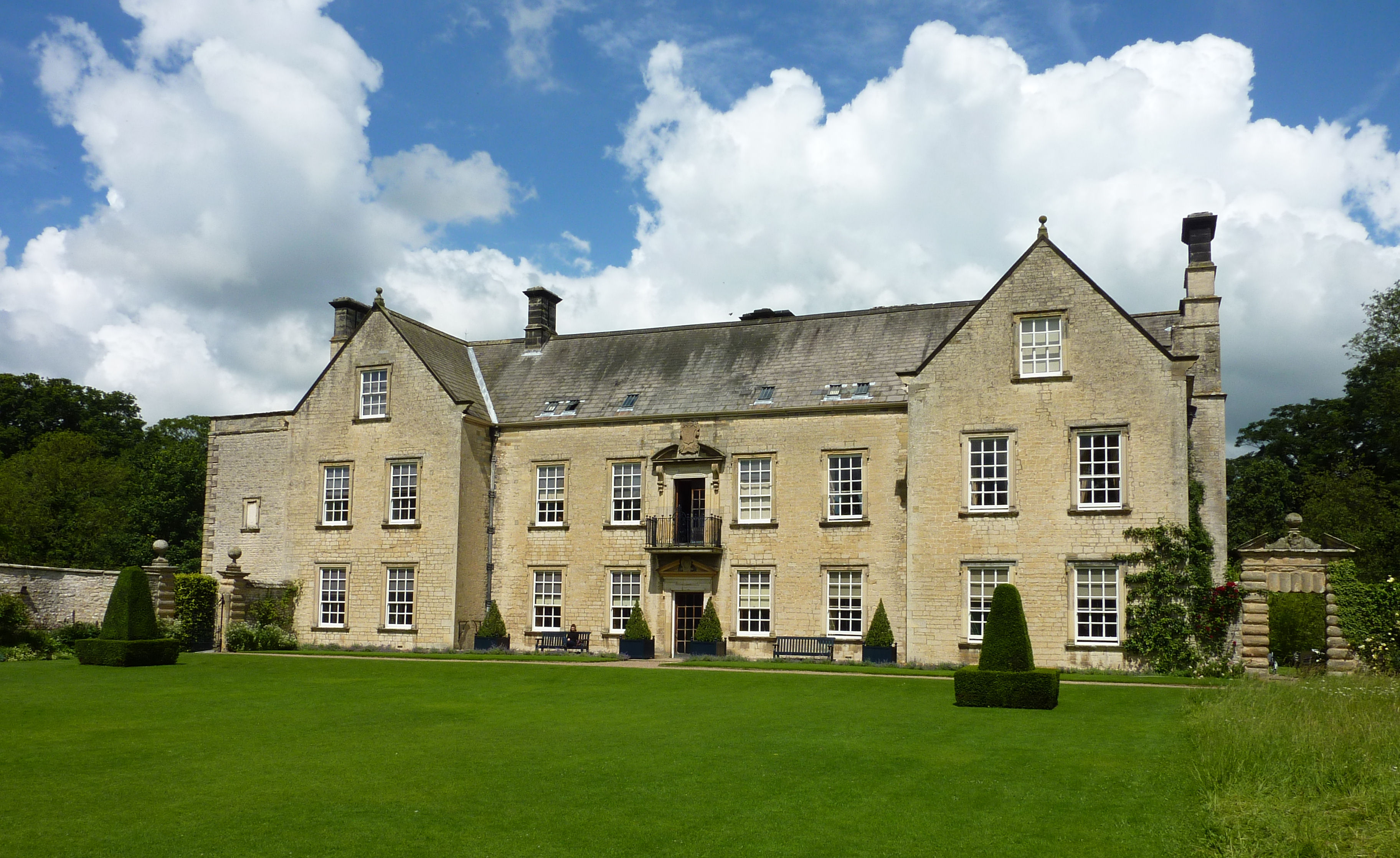
- South elevation

- Location within North Yorkshire

General information
- Type: Manor house
- Location: Nunnington, Ryedale, North Yorkshire, England
- Coordinates: 54°12′25″N 0°58′25″W (grid reference SE6779)
- Owner: National Trust

Website
- www.nationaltrust.org.uk/nunnington-hall/

Listed Building – Grade I
- Designated: 14 July 1955
- Reference no.: 1168075

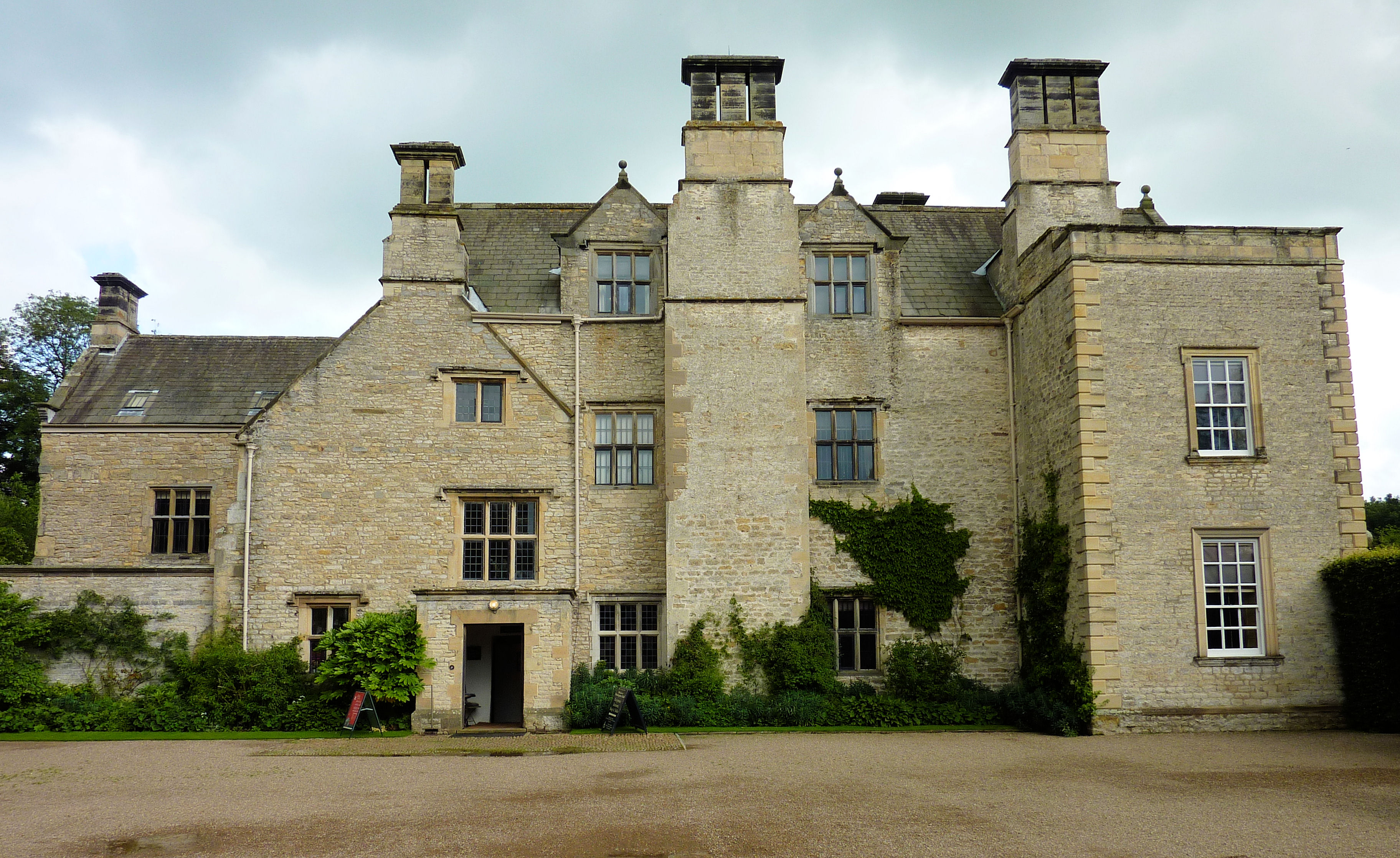
Nunnington Hall west elevation

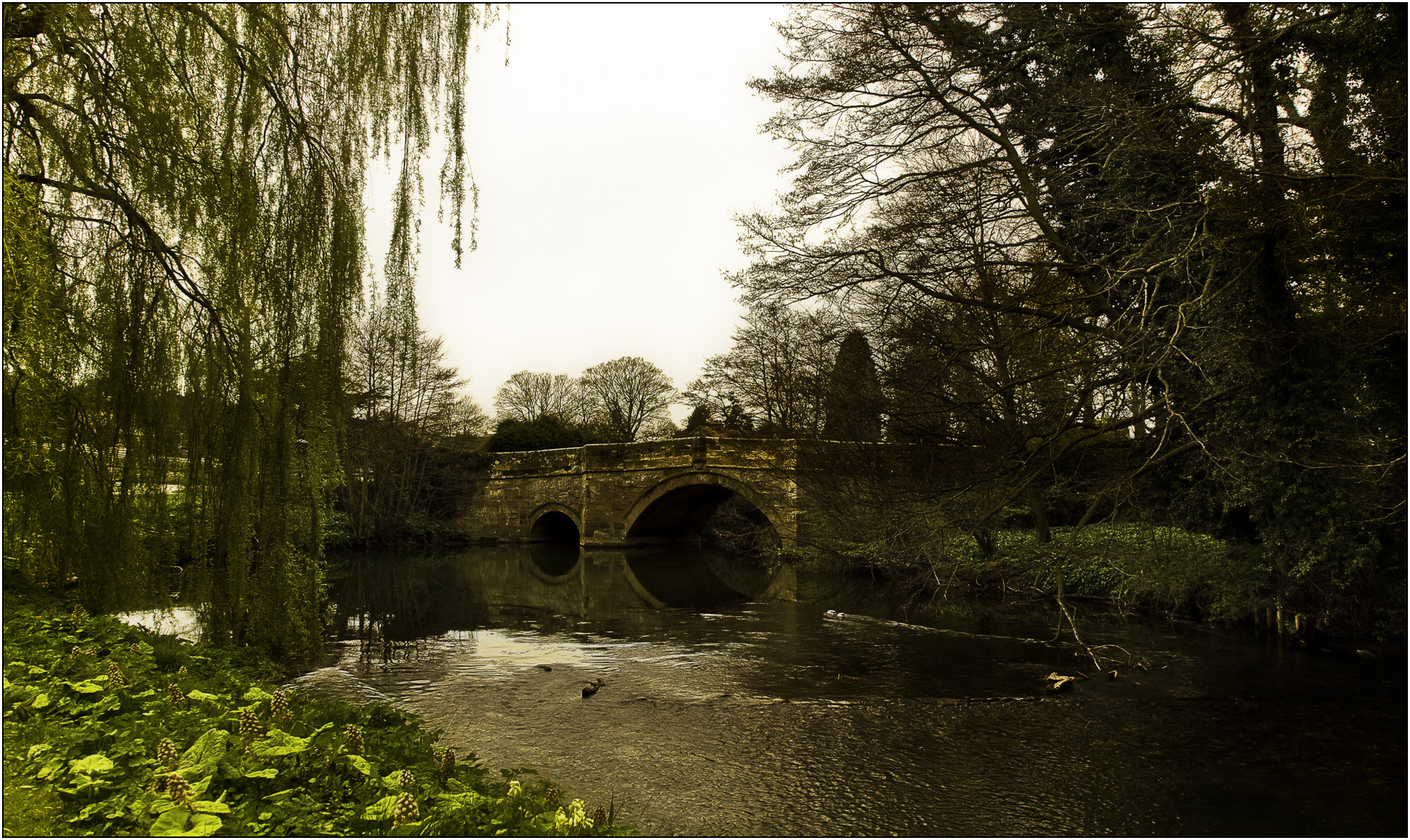
Bridge

Nunnington Hall is a country house situated in the English county of North Yorkshire. The river Rye, which gives its name to the local area, Ryedale, runs past the house, flowing away from the village of Nunnington. A stone bridge over the river separates the grounds of the house from the village. Above, a ridge known as Caulkley's Bank lies between Nunnington and the Vale of York to the south. The Vale of Pickering and the North York Moors lie to the north and east. Nunnington Hall is owned, conserved and managed as a visitor attraction by the National Trust.

The first Nunnington Hall was mentioned in the thirteenth century and the site has had many different owners. They include William Parr, 1st Marquess of Northampton, Dr Robert Huicke, Richard Graham, 1st Viscount Preston, the Rutson family and the Fife family. The present building is a combination of seventeenth- and eighteenth-century work. Most of the building seen today was created during the 1680s, when Richard Graham, 1st Viscount Preston, was its owner.

== History ==
In the medieval period, the land belonged to the wealthy St Mary's Abbey in York. Nunnington takes its name from a nunnery, likely in the present location of Nunnington Hall, which existed prior to the Norman Conquest before being dissolved around 1200. According to the Domesday Book, the manor of Nunnigtune in the 11th century included Stonegrave, Ness, Holme and Wykeham.

William Parr, 1st Marquess of Northampton, lord of the manor of Nunnington and brother of queen consort Catherine Parr, built the oldest parts of the surviving house of Nunnington, which now form part of the west front. Following the forfeiture of the estate in 1553 (for his part in setting Lady Jane Grey on the throne), Nunnington was again subject to let. One of the tenants was Dr Robert Huicke (also spelt Huick, Hicke, and Hicks), who was physician to both Catherine Parr and Elizabeth I. Dr Huicke was to be the one to tell the Queen that she would never have children. Huicke never lived at Nunnington however and the estate was managed by stewards. The sub-lease was granted to Thomas Norcliffe in 1583 and the family made many alterations over the next 60 years.

In 1603, George Watkins and others were granted a lease of the manor for 31 years. After 25 years, however, it was granted to Edward Ditchfield and others of the City of London, who sold it the same year for £3,687 to John Holloway who held the manor in 1630. By 1655 the manor had been sold for £9,500 by Humphrey Thayer to Ranald Graham, a merchant of Lewisham. Ranald was succeeded by his nephew Sir Richard Graham of Netherby, who was created Viscount Preston in 1681. He was attainted in 1689 for attempting to join James II in France and his lands and property were confiscated, but later returned after he was pardoned. He was succeeded by his son and heir Edward, the 2nd Viscount and he in turn by his son Charles, 3rd and last Viscount Preston. Charles' heirs on his death in 1739 were his aunts, Mary Graham and Catherine, Lady Widdrington, who were granted joint possession of the manor of Nunnington in 1748. Mary died unmarried and Lady Widdrington left her estates to Sir Bellingham Graham, Bt., of Norton Conyers. The property then descended in the Norton Conyers Graham family until 1839, when it was sold to William Rutson of Newby Wiske, the son of William Rutson of Allerton Lodge.

The hall was inherited in 1920 by Rutson's great-niece Margaret Rutson, who had married Ronald D'Arcy Fife. They undertook a major renovation of the property in the 1920s using the architect Walter Brierley. Margaret bequeathed Nunnington Hall, much of its contents, and its gardens to the National Trust upon her death in 1952, along with £25,000 for the upkeep of the property (£599,380 as of 2023).

The Hall stands within 8 acres (32,000 m^{2}) of organically managed grounds, with the main walled garden lying to the south of the building. The Walled Garden includes lawns, orchards, formal rose beds, mixed borders, a Tea Garden, and an Iris Garden. The orchards are managed as wildflower meadows containing flowers such as cowslip, primrose, snake's head fritillary, buttercup and camassia all growing below the fruit trees of which most are traditional Ryedale varieties. Another feature of the gardens are the resident peacocks. On 10 June 2007 Bluey, head of the peacock family, died under suspicious circumstances.

== Interior ==
=== The Stone Hall ===
Today visitors enter by a modest entrance and porch to the Stone Hall. This west-facing room is in the oldest part of the building and it dates from the sixteenth century. On the walls you can see preserved animal skins as trophies, a collection of arms and armour and also some large brown-wood furniture.

This space comprises the National Trust's reception area, and it is lit by two high windows which face a gravelled area to the west.

Also on the west wall a modern, (1920s) fireplace, in the style of the sixteenth century. The steps heading to the Dining Room in the south and the archway to a corridor in the east are of the same hand.

While this may have been the site of an earlier Great Hall, Lord Preston may have converted the Stone Hall to become a kitchen, alongside his own bedchamber, now dressed as a dining room.

The hunting trophies consist not only of animal hides and heads, elephant, rhinoceros, lion, tiger and antelope among them, but also of the souvenirs from World War II. Of the antelope specimen, which themselves cover one wall, both the giant eland and the tiny dik-dik are included. These all belonged to Colonel Fife. As well as a German tank crewman's helmet with its blast visor, Colonel Fife owned a Prussian Officer's helmet, flintlock pistols and a bayonet, all of these on display together in the Stone Hall.

As you walk around the room clockwise from the entrance, you see a centre table with carving and inlay which might be from the 1630s in Germany and behind it an English press of oak. Against the south wall is a long and tall settle made of panels recycled from the seventeenth century.

=== The Dining Room ===
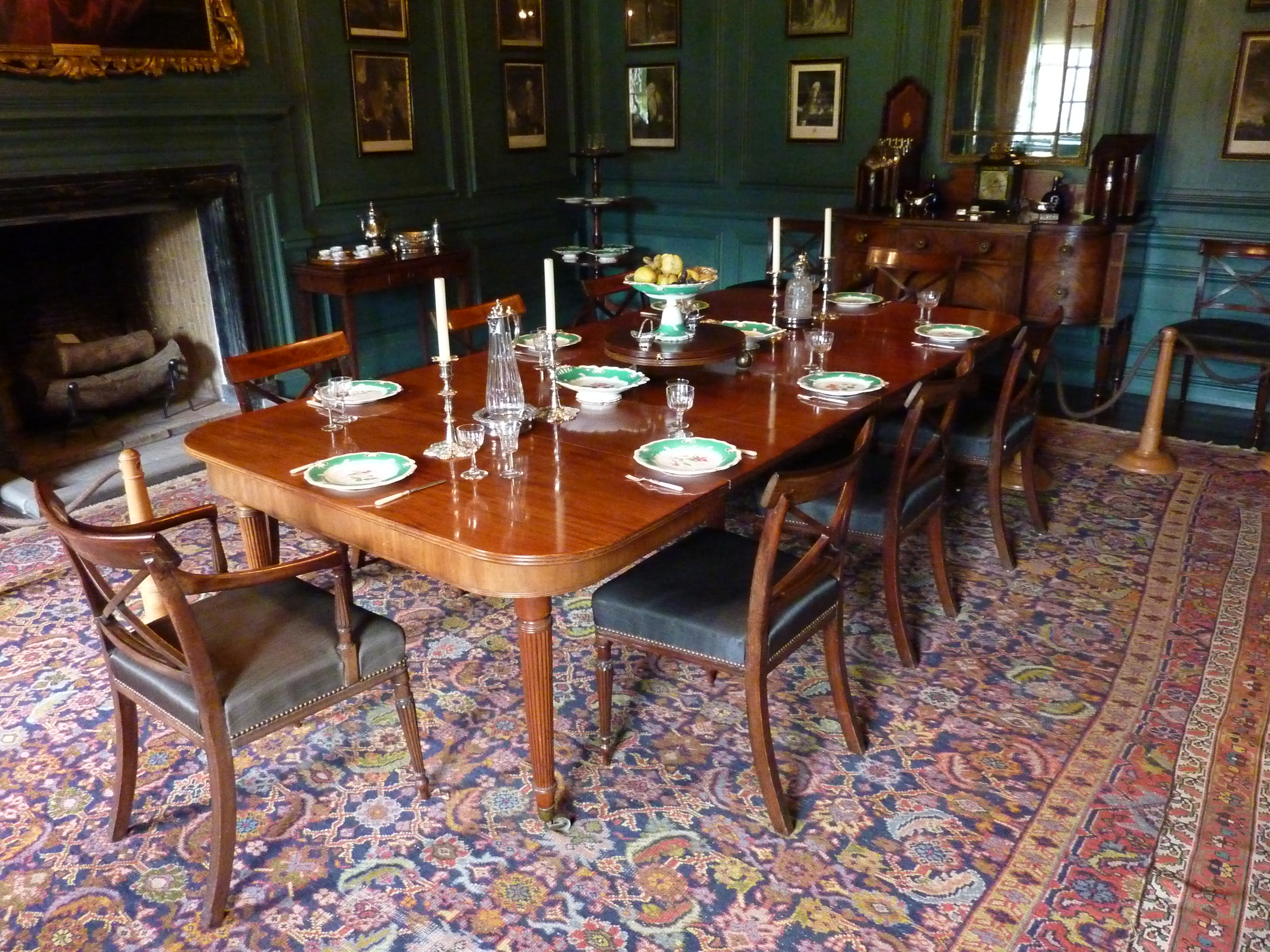
Dining Room, Nunnington Hall

The room used by the Fife family for dining is not part of the visitor's tour of this property and so the second room in their route has been dressed as an Edwardian dining room. The paint colour, a dark turquoise, survives from the 1920s, when Colonel Fife had this as his smoking room. More than two hundred years before the first Lord Preston had this as his chief bedroom, and added a new fireplace, panelling and some very early window sashes.

==== Pictures ====
- Attributed to Charles d'Agar (1669–1723), Edward, 2nd Viscount Preston (c. 1679/81-1710) and his son Charles, 3rd Viscount Preston (1706–1739)

A picture of the son and grandson of the 1st Viscount Preston, bought for display at Nunnington Hall by local supporters of the National Trust. Both of these sitters were heirs to Nunnington Hall, and both died in early life. The title Viscount Preston was lost on the death of Charles Graham in 1739. He left Nunnington Hall to his aunts Catharine, Lady Widdrington and Mary. The fine rococo frame has bounded this portrait for more than a century, but may have been designed for a mirror.

- Circle of Joseph Highmore, William, 4th Baron Widdrington

Purchased by the trust in January 2010 through the generosity of the Miss Mary Lawn Simpson Bequest and other gifts and bequests

- In the manner of Giovanni Paolo Pannini, (c. 1692–1765/8), Capriccio with Ruins

==== Mezzotints ====
In 1974 Miss Kathleen Cooper-Abbs gave an extensive and fine collection of mezzotints to the National Trust, which displayed some in the Dining Room at Nunnington Hall. These are prints of the eighteenth century after Joshua Reynolds (1723–1792).

==== Ceramics, metalwork and furniture ====
The fireplace mantel and dining table are set with a part of a dinner service from the eighteenth century. This Imari service from China carries the coat of arms of the Pitt family. Rococo candlesticks by J.Cafe in 1756, knives, also of the mid-eighteenth century and with pistol grips and a 1794 cake basket sit amongst the dinner service. Finally, two glass and plate silver claret jugs complete the display.

A Meissen set, with six flower decoration coffee cups and saucers, covers the side table. A coffee pot alongside is dated 1765, and was made by Priest of London. There is also a creamer of 1803 presented alongside.

A sideboard in the Sheraton style dates from the late eighteenth century. One side drawer front opens to reveal a wine keeping box lined with lead, and the other contains press-drawers for linen. On the sideboard two 1888 sauceboats reflect the late nineteenth-century taste for a revival of Georgian styles. There are also two knife boxes with cutlery of a mixture of dates, from around 1750 to the early nineteenth century. A pair of scissor-shaped candle snuffers of silver bears a crest of the Rutson family which owned Nunnington Hall.

A card table of around 1750 and made from mahogany stands between the south facing windows in this room, and a pier glass of the late eighteenth century with a giltwood frame hangs above it.

=== Lord Preston's room ===
In the French style of the period the bedchamber remained a place for entertaining guests in an open, public way. A withdrawing room provided a measure of privacy and so Viscount Preston annexed his bedroom with this small chamber to the west.

==== Pictures ====
- English, late seventeenth-century ceiling painting in panels. Arms of Viscount Preston and his wife, Lady Anne Howard, the daughter of the Earl of Carlisle.

These panels join the two family crests in one work. They include family mottoes and lie within a clouded background bordered with gold seraphim. This style of painting is also found on funerary hatchments.

- English, nineteenth century. Arms of William Rutson, (1791–1867). Oval, watercolour.

This Rutson bought Nunnington in 1839 from Sir Bellingham Graham. His motto means 'judge us by our actions'.

- Anonymous. Richard Graham, 1st Viscount Preston, (1648–1695). Engraving
- R. Sheppard after Sir Godfrey Kneller, (1646/9–1723). James II, (1633–1701). Engraving

Involved in the intrigue to restore James II's kingship, Richard Graham was imprisoned for his fidelity and was kept at the Tower of London. Upon his release, Preston spent the remainder of his life at Nunnington.

- Photographs. Two framed photographs on a side desk show first, the west front without the beech surrounded courtyard and second, the drawing by Samuel Buck of either a plan for or a plan of Nunnington's seventeenth-century garden.

==== Ceramics and furniture ====
- A potiche jar of the Kangxi era sits on the overmantel and was made in the early eighteenth century.
- A mid-Georgian pedestal desk is against the north wall. This desk is made from mahogany and has fluted and canted corners.
- In front of the desk is an armchair which is a few years older. Its seat cover may be a few years older still. The frame is partly made from padoukwood and is curved in the back and the seat rail.

=== The Oak Hall ===
Viscount Preston remodelled this room during the late seventeenth century, and evidence of this phase of building is visible throughout the room in the form of panelling, carving on the staircase and pediments above fireplaces and doorcases.

Panelling in this room was once painted, but is now bare, having been stripped during the refurbishment by Walter Brierly and the Fife family in the 1920s, an example of an Edwardian trend.

Pediments above doorcases are split, and very finely carved, along with the three arches on the north side of the room. Another split, triangle pediment surmounts the large cartouche bearing the Graham family coat of arms above the fireplace, and this high quality carving has been attributed to John Etty, the master carpenter from York (c. 1634–1708), a comparison drawn with his work at Sprotborough Hall in Doncaster. Sprotborough was demolished in 1926. The fireplace itself is carved from Hildenby stone, with its own split triangle pediment below the cartouche. Within this latter device, the Graham coat of arms rests above a supporting group of eagles, foliage and scrolls, terminating at either side with cherub's heads in profile. A likely inspiration for this design is the Livre d'Architecture by French architect Jean Barbet. Robert Pricke used Barbet's pattern in his 1674 work The Architect's Store-House.

In his Book of Sundry Draughts (1615), Walter Gedde included a pattern repeated on the floor of this room in stone flags, the squares and hexagons intersecting. An earlier source for this pattern came from Sebastiano Serlio's Il Quattro Libri Dell'Architettura, which came to England in 1611, a cornerstone of the late English Renaissance.

==== Pictures ====
Charles, 3rd Viscount Preston (1706–1739), by Enoch Seeman, (c. 1694–1745). This portrait shows Lord Preston wearing the robes of his peerage. His premature death meant that there was no direct descendant to receive Nunnington Hall or his title, so the estate passed to his aunts Mary and Catherine, but the viscountcy was extinguished. The support of the National Trust Associations made the purchase of this portrait possible in 1996.

Edward Graham, (c. 1679/81–1710), with his sister Catharine (1677–1757), as children. Edward was the second Viscount Preston in 1695, and for fifteen years before his early demise. Meanwhile Catherine, who lived to eighty, was married to Lord Widdrington. A Jacobite, Widdrington was convicted and condemned to death after the Jacobite uprising in 1715. Catherine however pleaded for his life and married him thereafter. The National Trust Associations part funded the acquisition of this picture along with the Victoria & Albert Museum, in 1987.

A Groom and Two Hunters, by John Ferneley, (1782–1860). Dated 1820, signed by the artist and inscribed 'Melton Mowbray'.

A Grey Hunter, by John Ferneley, (1782–1860). Dated 1820, signed by the artist and inscribed 'Melton Mowbray'.

William Rutson (1791–1867) on a Grey Hunter, by John Ferneley, (1782–1860). Dated 1820, signed by the artist and inscribed 'Melton Mowbray'. The sitter for this last of three pictures by John Ferneley, William Rutson, was an owner of Nunnington Hall. Rutson bought the estate in 1839, nineteen years after he had ordered these pictures from Ferneley.

==== Furniture ====
The Oak Hall contains an oak table, ten feet long, made during the sixteenth century. Mrs Fife, one of the owners of Nunnington in the twentieth century, installed the table in this room having found it in the kitchens. Today the table bears two large bowls of Celadon ware, from around the seventeenth century. On the south wall is a north-european cabinet of the late seventeenth century, with a display of mid-nineteenth-century Chamberlain's Worcester tea and coffee cups, along with other, eighteenth century ceramics. A longcase clock of around 1760 belonged first to William Rutson's grandfather, (also William), for whom it was made by a clockmaker from Kendal, William Wilson. The elder William Rutson had been Kendal's mayor in 1761, and the clock bears his initials as a monogram, on its dial. Near the stairs are a large cupboard made from pieces of recycled seventeenth-century panelling and an Italian chest of walnut. In the stairwell the Soho tapestry of around 1700 survives a sample of the work of John Vanderbank, in excellent condition, with a design of oriental allegories fashionable at a time of high import of oriental ceramics. In front of the fireplace a Bidjar rug of a final design is dated around 1900.

=== The drawing room ===
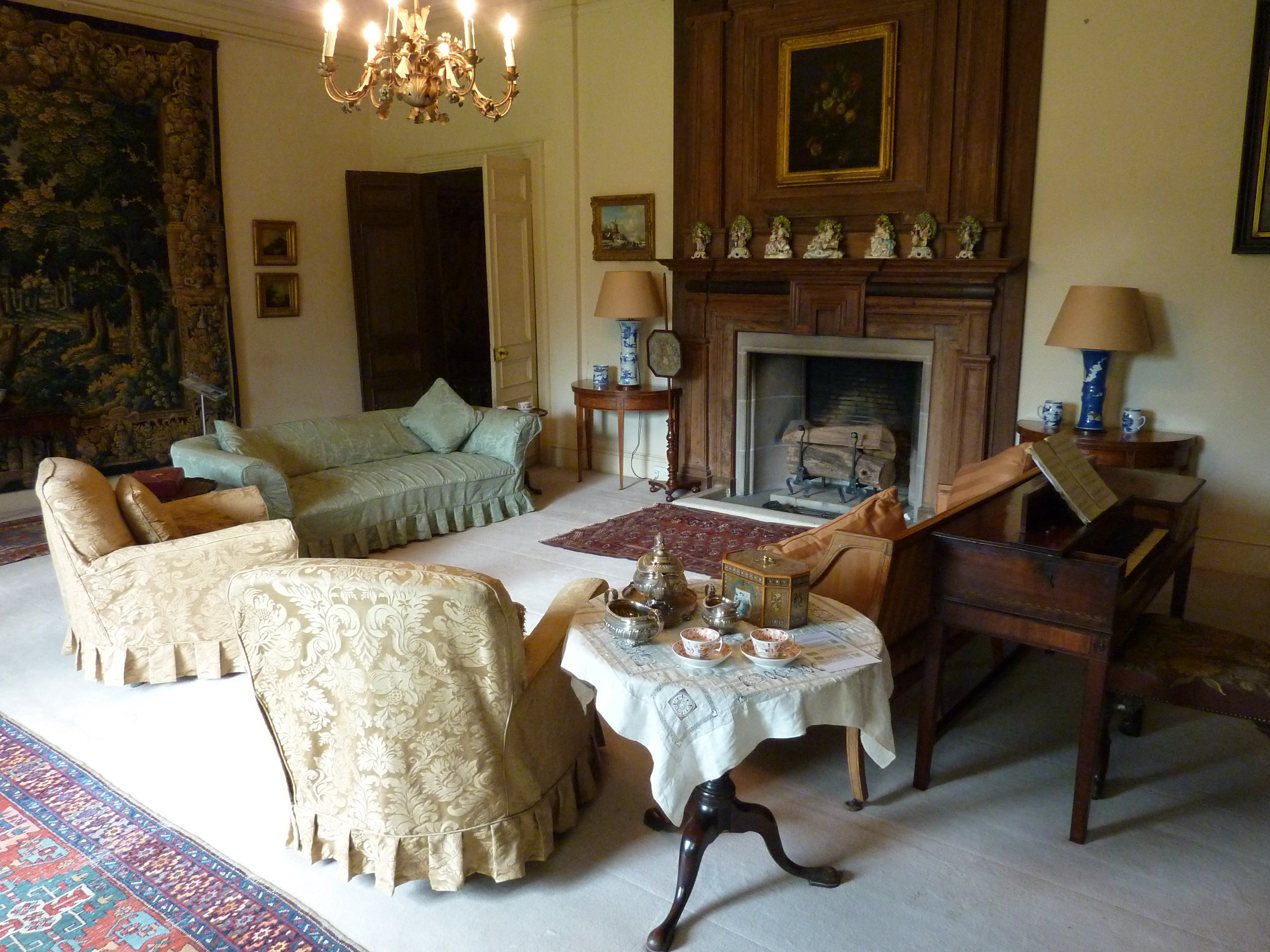
Drawing Room, Nunnington Hall

Above the Oak Hall the Drawing Room on the first floor contains a find from Nunnington's stores.

Found in a store at Nunnington by housekeepers, Shrimpers at Lyme Regis, a small picture in oils on board, has been attributed to Joseph Mallord William Turner (1775–1851)

The picture returned to Nunnington in 2006, having been studied by National Trust and Tate Gallery specialists in London over five years.

When the picture was found in a rack during routine housekeeping, cleaning revealed a faint and faded inscription-

Presented to me by JM Turner, 1832. J Harding

And another –

Lyme Regis. Shrimpers

Research and investigation identified J Harding as James Duffield Harding, (1797–1863), eminent watercolorist and draughtsman, and friend of Turner's. Comparing the handwriting on the inscription with Harding's manuscripts at the Royal Watercolour Society proved a match.

The title is in a different hand and a different medium, which fits the idea that Turner made the gift to Harding in 1832, and that the title was added later, by another.

Further evidence was found in the similarity between this picture and Turner's watercolour of 1811, held in Glasgow's art gallery – Lyme Regis, Dosetshire: A Squall, [sic].

Today Shrimpers at Lyme Regis hangs in the Drawing Room in a frame selected by the National Trust, a purchase made possible by the generosity of the Association of National Trust Members in Belgium.

The piano was recently restored by the local York firm of Banks.

The longcase clock in the corner was sold c. 1720 by William Troutbeck of Leeds.

For wine lovers and children the painting Grape Harvest in the South of France attributed to Hendrick van Ballen the Younger (1623–61) provides a glimpse of rural social history.

=== Colonel Fife's dressing room ===
Once part of the Drawing Room as can be seen from the unfinished look of the corner panelling.

On show are memorabilia from The Colonel's army career including his campaign medals and notices of Mentions in Despatches together with presentation cups from his days in India where he enjoyed success on the polo field and race course.

Photographs of Col Fife also demonstrate the substantial nature of the restoration work to Nunnington Hall.

One of the small watercolour paintings on display is a "View of Philae" by Edward Lear, better known for his owls and pussycats in seagreen boats.

The bedspread was worked by Fanny Wrather, great grandmother of Mrs Fife.

=== Mrs Fife's bedroom ===
The bed is painted in Neo-Classical style but is probably an Edwardian revival of this style.

Among the family portraits on display is a charming portrait of Mrs Fife (nee Margaret Rutson) as a young girl in pastel by Paul-Cesar Helleu (1859–1927) and a pencil drawing of Col Fife signed and dated 1915 by William Strang (1859–1921).

This room also has another much earlier example of Fanny Wrather's needlework; a sampler hanging adjacent to the late nineteenth-century pastel portrait of her.

=== Mrs Fife's dressing room ===
Similar to the room running off the Dining Room on the ground floor and part of the same remodelling undertaken by the 1st Viscount Preston.

The mezzotint female portraits are late eighteenth century after the style of Reynolds and form part of a collection given to the National Trust by Kathleen Cooper-Abbs owner and donor of Mount Grace Priory.

The miniature walnut-veneered bureau is likely to be either an apprentice's masterpiece or a furniture's salesman's showpiece.

=== The oak bedroom ===
The panelling in this room dates back to the Norcliffe family's occupation of the house (1583–1643) but the corner fireplace was put in during Lord Preston's remodelling in the late seventeenth century.

In front of the fireplace is a painted leather firescreen made from a piece of a set of leather wall hangings which according to a local historian, the Rev. Eastmead once decorated a room at Nunnington but which were shreds relegated to an attic room by 1824.

The oak bed is an example of an old stretcher base being updated at intervals by the addition of later posts and canopy.

The late seventeenth-century marquetry and turned side-table at the side of the bed opens out to reveal a tapestry of ?.

Over the door to the Bedroom Corridor is an early example of a "borrow" light window allowing natural light to reach the corridor which was probably formed as part of Lord Preston's alterations.

The Bedroom Corridor leads to the Reading Room where visitors can stop for a rest. This room was used in later years as a dressing room for the next door room, the Panelled Bedroom.

=== The panelled bedroom ===
The panelling in this room is also from the period of the Norcliffe occupation. The defacing of the panelling round the window is believed to have been the "work" of Cromwellian soldiers who were billeted at Nunnington during the Civil War.

The eared overmantel surround of the fireplace is believed to be a later addition and may be the work of the York joiner John Etty (1634–1708).

The room and its little adjacent Oratory are reputed to be haunted by a presence that passes over the bed and through the wall.

The various samplers displayed on the walls are a testament to the skill and diligence of their young creators from a time when a neat hand with a needle and an "improving" text was a sign of a good upbringing.

The bed in this room is an officer's travelling bed which can be dismantled for transportation in the baggage trains that have been an essential part of a campaigning army on the move throughout history.

=== The nursery ===
In the 1920s this room was occupied by the "odd boy" whose job was to run the household's errands. It is now furnished as the Nursery as the room originally used for this purpose by the Fifes is in a part of the house not on the visitor's route.

Most of the children's furniture and toys on display are from the Victorian period onwards.

"The Baby House" (c. 1800–10) is furnished and decorated in eighteenth-century taste and was made for the Rutson family in the nineteenth century. It would originally have been kept in the Drawing Room as it was not made as a children's toy.

=== The west staircase and mezzanine landings ===
These form the attic floor which housed the servants' quarters in the 1920s and 1930s. Miss Holdaway, Mrs Fife's personal maid, occupied the room that currently is used as the main exhibition room but the cook only had the much smaller exhibition room next door. The room now housing the Carlisle Collection of miniature rooms was formerly divided with one part being a sewing room with rooms beyond housing the third housemaid, kitchen-, scullery- and parlourmaids and the remaining two housemaids.

== See also ==
- Grade I listed buildings in North Yorkshire (district)
- Listed buildings in Nunnington
