= Nunnington Bridge =

Bridge in Nunnington, North Yorkshire, England

Coordinates: 54°12′24″N 0°58′32″W

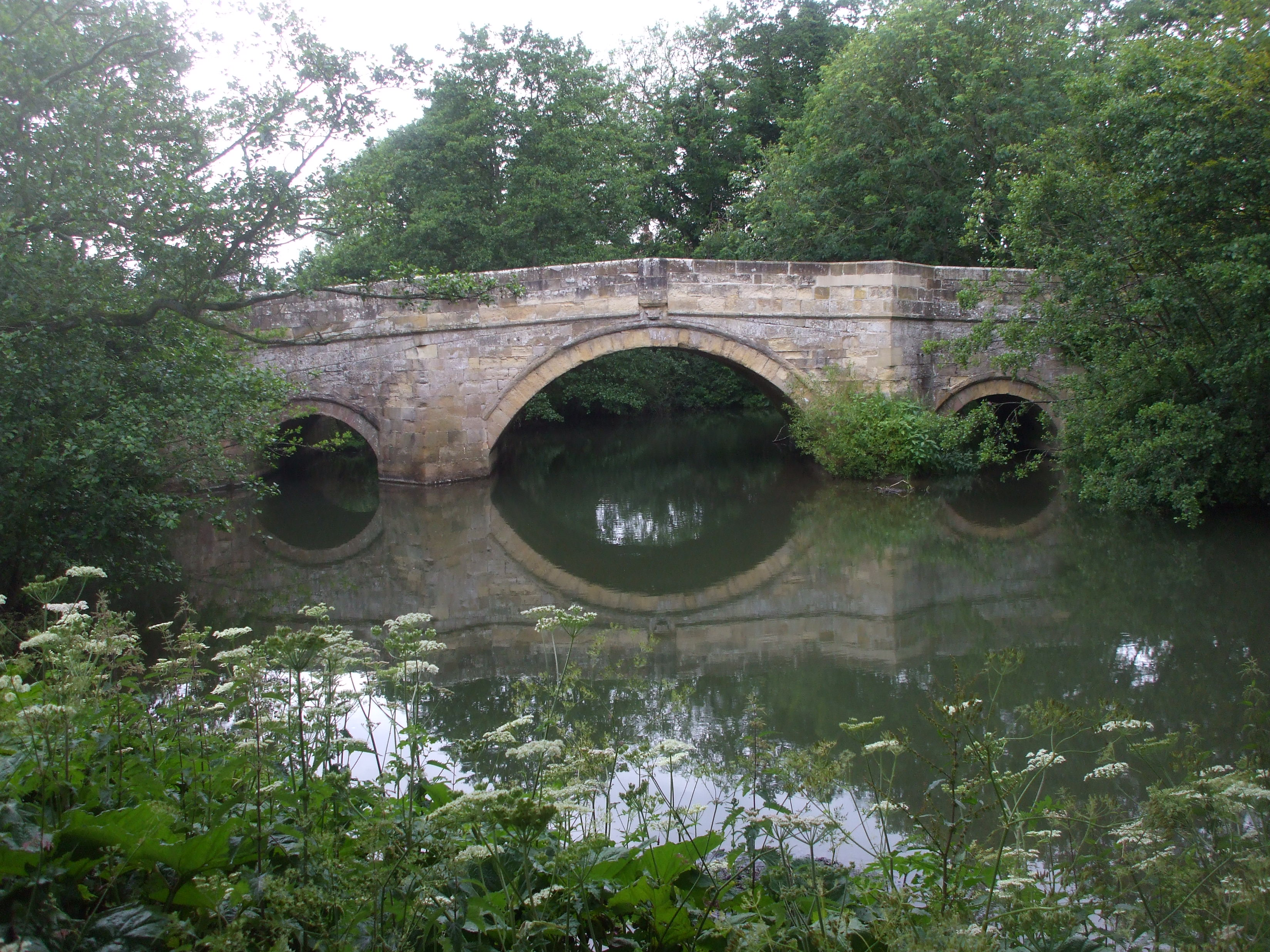
The bridge, in 2011

Nunnington Bridge is a historic structure in Nunnington, a village in North Yorkshire, in England.

The bridge crosses the River Rye near Nunnington Hall. The first known bridge at the site was a two-arch structure, built in the 17th century. The current bridge was constructed in the early 18th century, and near the end of the century was widened on the upstream side and partly rebuilt. The bridge has been grade II* listed since 1955.

The bridge is built of sandstone and consists of three arches, a larger segmental arch in the centre, flanked by smaller round arches. The bridge has cutwaters, there is moulding on the downstream side, a chamfered string course, and a plain parapet with chamfered coping. The cutwaters rise into the parapet to form embrasures, in the centre is an octagonal drum, corbelled on the outer side, and at the ends are canted abutments. Edwyn Jervoise suggests that the drum may originally have carried a statue.

== See also ==
- Grade II* listed buildings in North Yorkshire (district)
- Listed buildings in Nunnington
