= William Rutson =

British merchant and landowner

William Rutson of Newby Wiske Hall and Nunnington Hall (17 October 1791 – 11 May 1867) was a merchant and landowner who served as Justice of the Peace, Deputy Lieutenant and High Sheriff of Yorkshire.

== Early life ==
Rutson was born on the 17 October 1791, the son of William Rutson of Allerton Lodge and Liverpool and Frances Wrather, daughter of Simon Wrather. He was educated at Trinity College, Cambridge and was a Fellow Commoner during his time there.

== Career ==
Rutson purchased Nunnington Hall in 1839 for £152,388 in order to be used as the family hunting lodge. He was also a partner in his father's business, Ewart Myers, which had previously been known as Ewart Rutson after his father. In 1851 Rutson was appointed High Sheriff of Yorkshire, following Octavius Vernon Harcourt of Swinton Park. Rutson was also appointed Justice of the Peace, Deputy Lieutenant.

== Family life ==
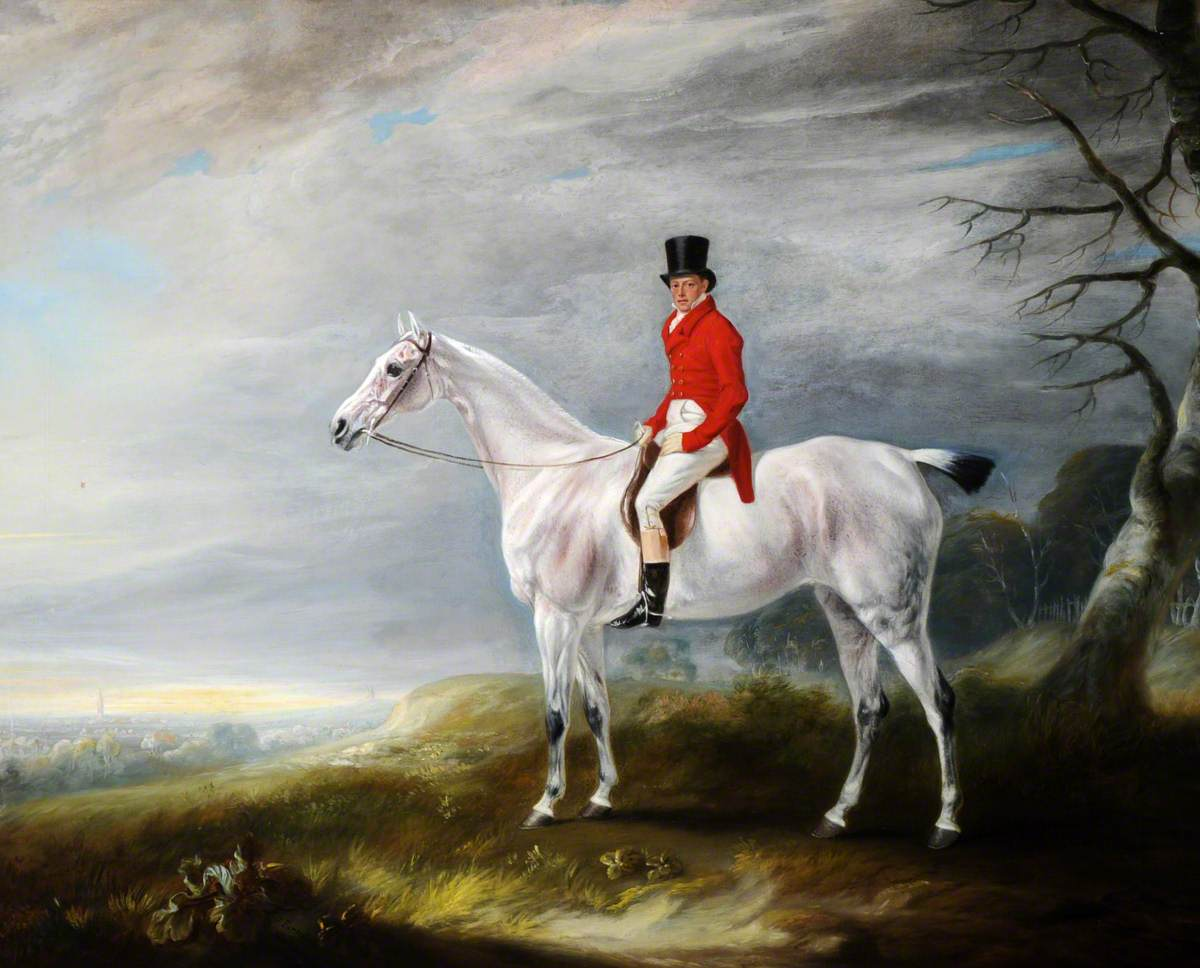
John Ferneley: William Rutson (1791-1867) on a Grey Hunter

Rutson married Charlotte Mary Ewart, daughter of William Ewart, his father's business partner, on 17 February 1825. They had four children:

- William Rutson, a Lieutenant in the 70th Regiment, died aged 21 on 26 May 1846
- John Rutson, inherited Newby Wiske Hall and Nunnington Hall
- Henry Rutson, 1831-1920
- Albert Osliff Rutson, Barrister, Politician and Fellow of Magdalen College, Oxford, 1836-1890

Rutson died on 11 May 1867, aged 75, leaving a fortune of more than £120,000, and was succeeded by his second son, John, who also served as Justice of the Peace and gave the important Rutson Collection of Musical Instruments to the Royal Academy of Music Museum.
