= Nunnington Mill =

Watermill in Nunnington, North Yorkshire, England

Coordinates: 54°12′23″N 0°57′59″W

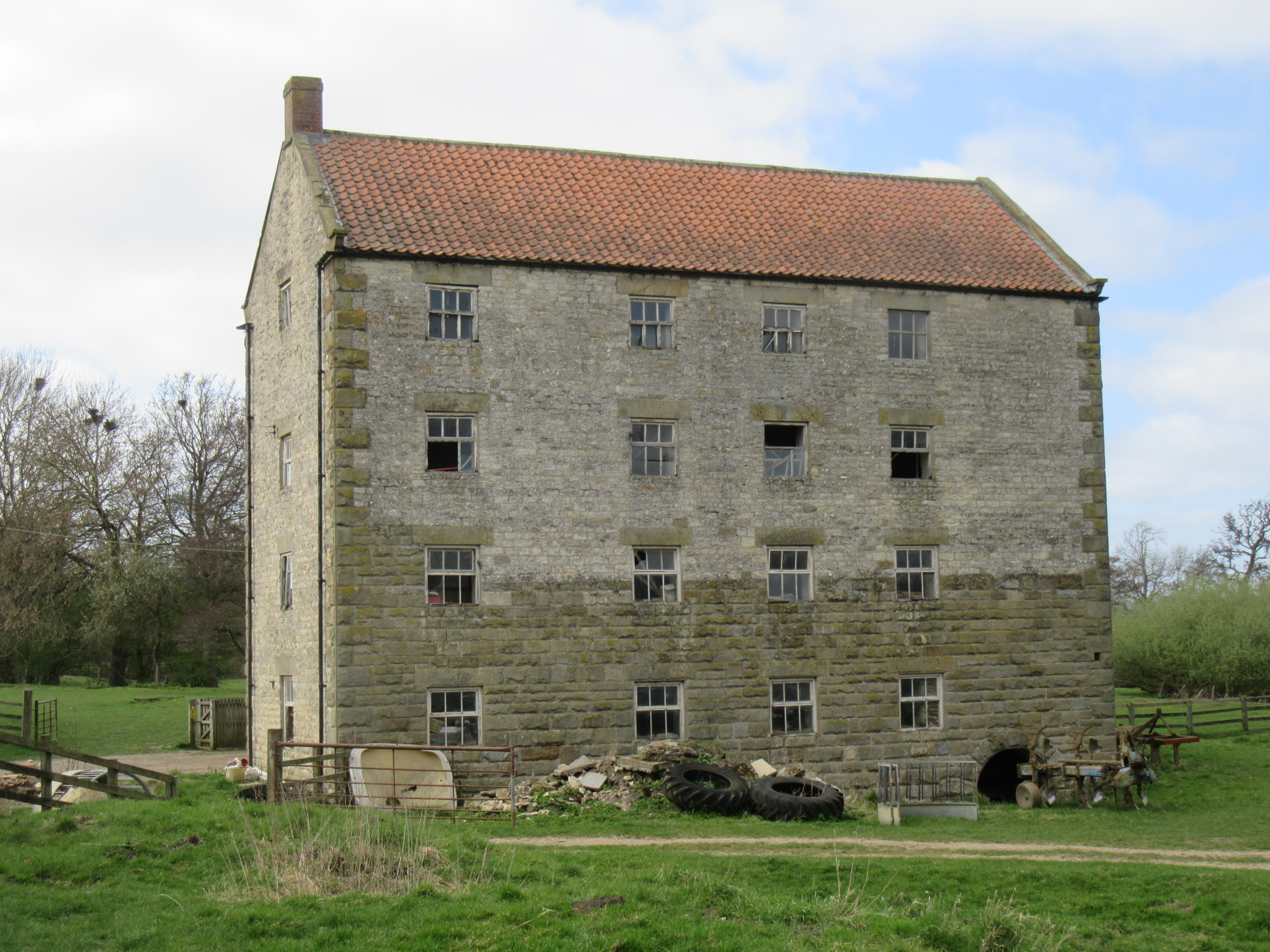
The building, in 2021

Nunnington Mill is a historic watermill in Nunnington, a village in North Yorkshire, in England.

There was a cornmill on the River Rye in Nunnington at the time of the Domesday Book. The current building was constructed in the mid or late 18th century, and it was extended and partly rebuilt in the 19th century. It remained in use until about 1960, then was converted into a granary. The building was grade II listed in 1987.

The original part of the mill is constructed of limestone, and the rebuilt part is in rusticated stone. It has a pantile roof with coped gables and shaped kneelers. It has four storeys and five bays. At the right end is a wheel arch with rusticated voussoirs, and all the windows have top opening lights. At the rear is a cart shed, and on the right bay is a stable door on the lower two floors, and above them is a weatherboarded lucam. The undershot waterwheel survives, with a cast iron rim and centre and wooden spokes and paddles. Much machinery also survives on the ground floor.

== See also ==
- Listed buildings in Nunnington
