= Listed buildings in Nunnington =

Nunnington is a civil parish in the county of North Yorkshire, England. It contains 29 listed buildings that are recorded in the National Heritage List for England. Among these, two are listed at Grade I, the highest designation, one is listed at Grade II*, and the remaining buildings are listed at Grade II. The parish includes the village of Nunnington along with the surrounding rural area. Most of the listed buildings are houses, farmhouses and associated structures, and the others include a church, a group of former almshouses, two bridges, a former mill, a public house, a former school and a telephone kiosk.

== Key ==
Grade	Criteria
I	Buildings of exceptional interest, sometimes considered to be internationally important
II*	Particularly important buildings of more than special interest
II	Buildings of national importance and special interest

== Buildings ==
Name and location	Photograph	Date	Notes	Grade
All Saints' and St James' Church; 54.20309°N 0.98055°W		Late 13th century	The church has been altered and extended through the centuries, the tower was added in 1672, and alterations were made in 1883–84 by Ewan Christian. It is built in stone with stone flag roofs, and consists of a nave, a south porch, a chancel with a vestry and organ chamber, and a west tower. The tower has two stages on a plinth, with quoins, a two-light west window with a pointed head and a hood mould, paired bell openings with chamfered mullions, a clock face, chamfered string courses, and an embattled parapet with crocketed pinnacles.	I
Nunnington Hall; 54.20678°N 0.97375°W		Mid-16th century (probable)	A country house that has been altered and extended. It is in sandstone with quoins and a stone slate roof. The south front has a central range of two storeys and five bays, flanked by gabled cross-wings with two storeys and an attic, and two bays, and to the left is a two-storey one-bay extension. The central doorway has an eared architrave, and a broken pediment containing a cartouche. Above it is a balcony with a wrought iron balustrade, and a doorway with an architrave and a segmental pediment with a coat of arms. The windows are sashes in eared architraves. The cross-wings have coped gables, shaped kneelers and ball finials.	I
Graham Hall Cottages; 54.20540°N 0.97484°W		Late 17th century	A group of five almshouses, later converted into two cottages and a village hall. The building is in stone with stone flag roofs, and has an H-shaped plan. The central range has one storey and an attic, and three bays, flanked by one-storey two-bay ranges linked to cross-wings. The central range has a doorway, casement windows and a gabled dormer. The gable end of each cross wing contains sash windows with a wedge lintel and a keystone, and above is an owl hole, and a finial on the gable apex.	II
Garden walls, gateways and gate piers, Nunnington Hall; 54.20650°N 0.97254°W		Late 17th century	The walls enclosing the garden, and the gate piers, are in limestone, the walls with moulded and flat coping. The gates are in wrought and cast iron. The gateways in the north and south walls have bolstered blocks, an entablature, a moulded cornice, and a broken pediment containing a cartouche, and a ball and pedestal finial. In the east and west walls, the gateways have bolstered blocks, a moulded cornice and a ball and pedestal finial.	II
Gate piers and walls west of Nunnington Hall; 54.20649°N 0.97488°W		Late 17th century	The gate piers flanking the entrance to the drive are in limestone, and are about 4.5 metres (15 ft) in height. They have bolstered blocks, and each has a moulded cornice and a ball and pedestal finial. The wall to the east is about 2.4 metres (7 ft 10 in) in height, raked up to about 3.6 metres (12 ft), with cambered coping.	II
Gate piers and walls east of High Orchard; 54.20560°N 0.97175°W	—	Late 17th century	The gate piers and walls are in limestone. The piers are about 5.8 metres (19 ft) in height, and each has bolstered blocks, a moulded cornice and a ball and pedestal finial. The walls are about 4.5 metres (15 ft) in height, and have cambered coping.	II
Manor Farmhouse and railings 54.20638°N 0.97848°W	—	Late 17th to early 18th century	The farmhouse is in stone, and has a pantile roof with coped gables and plain kneelers. There are two storeys and four bays. The doorway has a plain surround and a cornice hood, and to its right are two three-light chamfered mullioned windows with double chamfered surrounds. To the left and on the upper floor are sash windows, those on the ground floor with flat arches and incised keystones. In front of the house are oval-section reeded railings with fleur-de-lys tips.	II
Nunnington Bridge; 54.20731°N 0.97561°W		Early 18th century	The bridge carries a road over the River Rye. It is in sandstone and consists of three arches, a larger segmental arch in the centre, flanked by smaller round arches. The bridge has cutwaters, there is moulding on the downstream side, a chamfered string course, and a plain parapet with chamfered coping. The cutwaters rise into the parapet to form embrasures, in the centre is an octagonal drum, corbelled on the outer side, and at the ends are canted abutments.	II*
The Bungalow; 54.20552°N 0.98135°W	—	Early 18th century	The house is in stone with a pantile roof. There are two low storeys, two bays, and a single-storey lean-to on the right. The door is in the lean-to, and the windows are horizontally-sliding sashes.	II
Thwaite Cottage and adjacent house 54.20595°N 0.97984°W	—	Early 18th century	Two house in limestone with a pantile roof. At the left, there are two low storeys and two bays, to the right is a single-storey three-bay range, and beyond that is a one-storey one-bay extension. On the front is a doorway, some of the windows have fixed lights, and the others are horizontally-sliding sashes.	II
Bridge Cottage; 54.20595°N 0.98121°W		18th century	The house is in stone and has a pantile roof. There are two storeys and one bay, and projecting on the left is a one-storey one-bay extension. The doorway, on the right, is approached by a step, the windows on the front are horizontally-sliding sashes, and in the extension is a top-opening window.	II
East Ness Bridge; 54.19470°N 0.93460°W		18th century	The bridge carries Railway Street over Holbeck. It is in limestone, and consists of three stepped segmental arches, with voussoirs, a band and a coped parapet.	II
Highfield Farmhouse; 54.20077°N 0.95809°W	—	Mid-18th century	The farmhouse, which was later extended, is in sandy limestone with a pantile roof. There are two storeys, the original part has two bays, with a three-bay extension to the right. The doorway in the original part is under a round arch with a keystone. The windows are a mix of sashes, some horizontally-sliding, and casements, most with wedge lintels, and some with keystones.	II
Outbuildings west of the Royal Oak; 54.20392°N 0.98130°W	—	18th century	The range of stable buildings and a cart shed is in sandy limestone with a pantile roof. There is one storey and seven bays, and it contains various doorways. On the right gable end is a cockerel weathervane.	II
Trowbridge Farmhouse; 54.22159°N 0.94477°W	—	1754	The farmhouse is in limestone on the front and rendered at the rear, and has a pantile roof. There are two storeys, three bays and a rear extension. Above the doorway is a datestone, there is one fixed-light window, and the other windows are horizontally-sliding sashes.	II
Nunnington Mill; 54.20627°N 0.96629°W		Mid to late 18th century	The mill has been enlarged and partly rebuilt and later used for other purposes. The original part is in limestone, and the rebuilt part is in rusticated stone. It has a pantile roof with coped gables and shaped kneelers. There are four storeys and five bays. At the right end is a wheel arch with rusticated voussoirs, and all the windows have top opening lights. At the rear is a cart shed, and on the right bay is a stable door on the lower two floors, and above them is a weatherboarded lucam.	II
Pin Cottage; 54.20366°N 0.98105°W	—	Mid to late 18th century	The house is in stone with a pantile roof. There are two storeys and three bays, and the gable end faces the street. On the front is a doorway, and the windows are horizontally-sliding sashes.	II
Royal Oak; 54.20380°N 0.98091°W		Mid to late 18th century	The public house, which was extended in the 19th century, is in limestone with a pantile roof. The original part has two storeys and two bays, and the later part to the right has two storeys and three bays, and a single-storey one-bay extension on the right. The doorway has a divided fanlight, and the windows are sash windows, that in the extension horizontally-sliding. The windows in the original part have keystones. In the left return is the original entrance, now blocked and containing a fixed light with a grooved keystone.	II
The Gables and attached outbuilding 54.20609°N 0.98036°W		Mid to late 18th century	The house, former shop and outbuilding are in sandy limestone with pantile roofs. In the centre is a two-storey one-bay block, flanked by one-storey one-bay wings, and on the far right is a one-storey one-bay outbuilding. There is a doorway in the centre block and a flat-topped half-dormer above, and another half-dormer in the right wing. The other windows are horizontally-sliding sashes.	II
Elleron and 5 Church Street; 54.20527°N 0.98094°W	—	Late 18th century	A pair of houses in stone, limestone at the front, with pantile roofs. There are two storeys, each house has two bays, Elleron on the right is slightly higher, and on the left is a single-storey single-bay extension. A flight of steps leads up to the central doorway of Elleron, the entrance to No. 5 is at the rear, and the windows in both houses are horizontally-sliding sashes.	II
Glebe House; 54.20594°N 0.97941°W		Late 18th century	The house is in sandy limestone, and has a pantile roof with coped gables and shaped kneelers. There are two storeys and three bays, and an outshut. The doorway is in the centre, and the windows are sashes with painted tooled lintels.	II
Jasmine House; 54.20359°N 0.98120°W	—	Late 18th century	The house is in sandy limestone with a pantile roof. There are two storeys and two bays. The doorway has a divided fanlight, it is flanked by cross windows, and on the upper floor are casement windows.	II
Manor Farmhouse, Muscoates; 54.21323°N 0.94359°W	—	Late 18th century	The farmhouse is in red brick on the front and sides, and sandstone at the rear, with quoins and a pantile roof. There are two storeys, a double depth plan, a front of three bays, and a single-storey extension. Above the central doorway is a round-headed stair window with an arched surround springing from imposts. The other windows are horizontally-sliding sashes.	II
Ness Hall; 54.20134°N 0.93509°W	—	Late 18th century	The house, which was later extended, is in limestone with quoins, a stepped eaves course, and a pantile roof with coped gables and shaped kneelers. There are two storeys and an L-shaped plan, with a front range of five bays. In the centre is a porch with square columns and an entablature, and a doorway with a plain surround and an inscribed lintel. The windows are sashes, some with keystones. The rear wing has three bays, and contains sash windows, a stair window with a flat arch and a keystone, and flat-topped dormers.	II
Teal House and attached cottage 54.20587°N 0.97969°W	—	Late 18th century	The house and cottage are in sandy limestone, and have a pantile roof with coped gables and kneelers. There are two storeys, the house has three bays, and the cottage to the left has one bay. On the centre of the house is a gabled porch and a doorway with a divided fanlight, and the windows are sashes. The cottage has a doorway and casement windows.	II
High North Holme Farmhouse; 54.21771°N 0.91989°W		c. 1780	The farmhouse is in rendered stone, the extension is in brick, and it has a slate roof. There are two storeys, a front of five bays, and a rear wing. The central doorway has pilasters, a rectangular fanlight, and a dentilled cornice, and the windows are sashes.	II
The House; 54.20473°N 0.98042°W	—	Early 19th century	The house is in limestone, and has a pantile roof with coped gables and shaped kneelers. There are two storeys and two bays. The doorway has a fanlight with Gothic glazing, the windows on the front are casements, and at the rear is a round-arched sash window with Gothic glazing.	II
Old School; 54.20626°N 0.97884°W		1869	The former school is in limestone on a chamfered plinth, with quoins, and a slate roof with coped gables, shaped kneelers, and fleur-de-lys finials, and crested ridge tiles. There is a cruciform plan, the front facing the road with three bays, the middle bay projecting and gabled. The middle bay contains a stepped triple lancet window with a hood mould, and above it is a roundel with a moulded surround, containing an inscription and the date, and on the outer bays are single-light lancet windows with hood moulds.	II
Telephone kiosk 54.20582°N 0.97947°W		1935	The K6 type telephone kiosk in adjacent to Glebe House was designed by Giles Gilbert Scott. Constructed in cast iron with a square plan and a dome, it has three unperforated crowns in the top panels.	II
