= Walter de Teye =

English nobleman

Coat of arms of Walter de Teye, Lord of Stonegrave, Or, on a fess between two chevrons Gules, three mullets Argent..

Walter de Teye (died 1324), Lord of Middleton and Stonegrave was an English noble. He fought in the wars in Scotland. He was a signatory of the Baron's Letter to Pope Boniface VIII in 1301.

== Biography ==
Walter's parentage is not currently known, however he is known to have had a brother Roger. He fought in the wars in Scotland and was Governor of Berwick-on-Tweed in 1300. He was a signatory of the Baron's Letter to Pope Boniface VIII in 1301. Walter married Isabel, daughter of John de Stonegrave and Ida Wake, she was the widow of Simon de Pateshulle. Walter died in 1324, without issue and was buried at All Saints' and St James' Church, Nunnington in Yorkshire, where his effigy is placed. He was succeeded by his step son John de Pateshulle.
