= All Saints' and St James' Church, Nunnington =

Church in Nunnington, North Yorkshire, England

Coordinates: 54°12′11″N 0°58′50″W

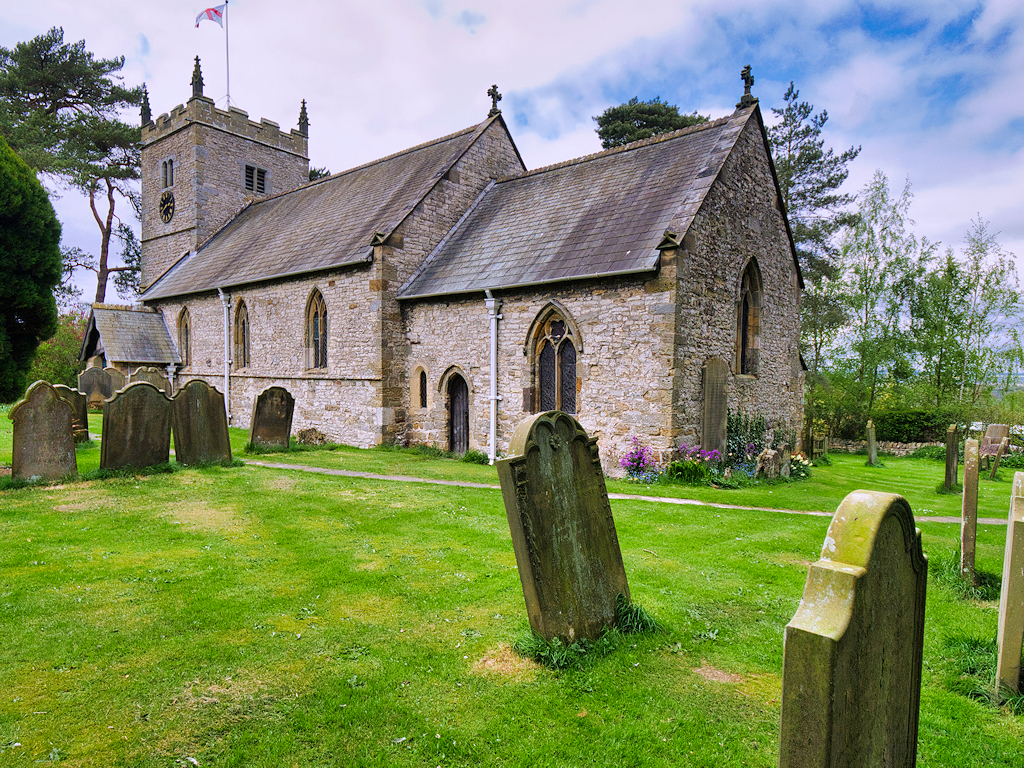
The church, in 2022

All Saints' and St James' Church is the parish church of Nunnington, a village in North Yorkshire, in England.

It is possible that the church's nave may have been built in the 12th century, but Historic England states that it was built in the late 13th century, at the same time as the chancel. The tower was rebuilt in 1672, and the vestry was rebuilt and an organ chamber added in about 1824. From 1883 to 1884, the church was restored by Ewan Christian, who replaced the roof and rebuilt the porch and tower arch. It was grade I listed in 1955. In 2025, the church was awarded a grant to replace some frosted glass windows with clear glazing.

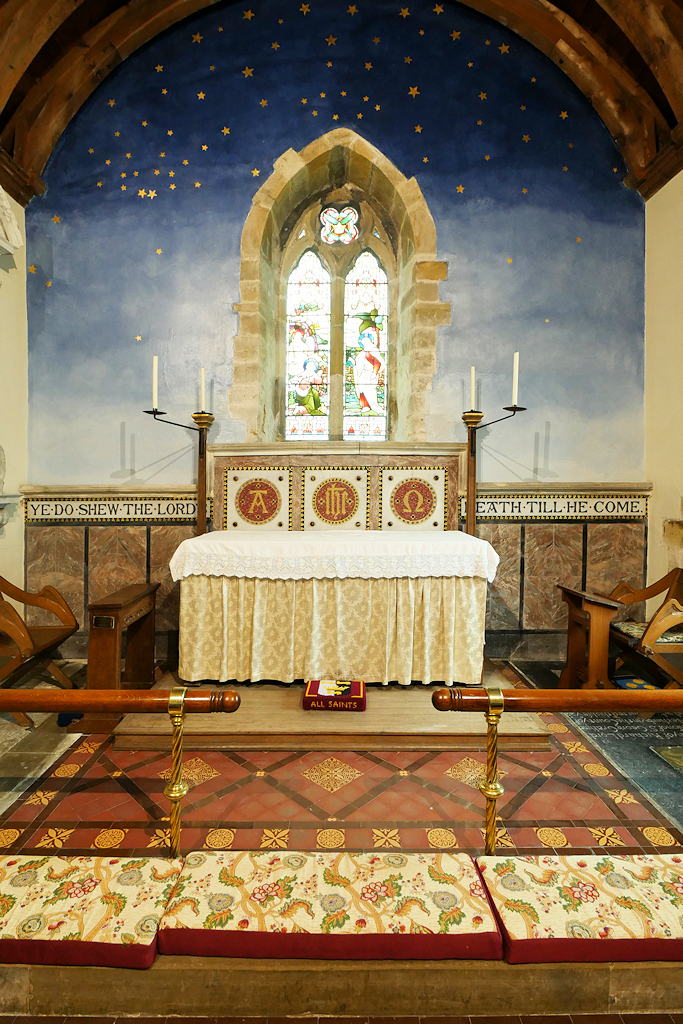
The altar and east window

The church is built in stone with stone flag roofs, and consists of a nave, a south porch, a chancel with a vestry and organ chamber, and a west tower. The tower has two stages on a plinth, with quoins, a two-light west window with a pointed head and a hood mould, paired bell openings with chamfered mullions, a clock face, chamfered string courses, and an embattled parapet with crocketed pinnacles. Inside, there is a 17th-century pulpit, and the font is of similar date. The west screen and lectern were carved by Robert Thompson. There are two pieces of 10th-century carved stone, one depicting a dragon. There are several monuments, the oldest being an effigy of about 1325 which is believed to be of Walter de Teye.

== See also ==
- Grade I listed buildings in North Yorkshire (district)
- Listed buildings in Nunnington
