= Robert Pricke =

English engraver

Robert Pricke (fl. 1669 – 1698) was an English engraver.

== Biography ==
Pricke was a pupil of Wenceslaus Hollar, and kept a shop for prints and maps in Whitecross Street, Cripplegate, London, during the latter half of the seventeenth century. Here he published some important architectural works, mostly translated from the French, and illustrated with engravings by himself.

== Works ==
- "A new Treatise of Architecture according to Vitruvius," from the French of Julien Mauclerc, 1669 (other editions in 1670, 1676, and 1699).
- "A new Book on Architecture, wherein is represented Forty Figures of Gates and Arches triumphant, &c. &c., by Alexander Francine, Florentine … set forth by Robert Pricke … 1669" (with a portrait of Francini).
- "The Art of Fair Building, wherein are Augmentations of the newest Buildings made in France, by the Designs and Ordering of P. le Muet, and others, published by Robert Pricke," 1670 (2nd edit. 1675).
- "Perspective Practical, or a plain … method of … representing all things to the eye at a distance, by the exact Rules of Art. … By a Religious Person of the Society of Jesus, a Parisien [J. Dubreuil]. Faithfully translated out of French and illustrated with 150 copper cuts, set forth in English by R. Pricke," 1672 (2nd edition, 1698).
- "The Ornaments of Architecture, containing Compartments, Mantlings, Foldings, Festones, &c., &c. … with some Designs for Carving and Painting of eminent Coaches. … Containing Fifty Copperplate Prints; collected out of the Works of several eminent Masters, and set forth by Robert Pricke," 1674.
- A few etchings of shipping, &c., were also executed by Pricke.
