= Nunnington =

Village and civil parish in North Yorkshire, England

Coordinates: 54°12′18″N 0°58′42″W

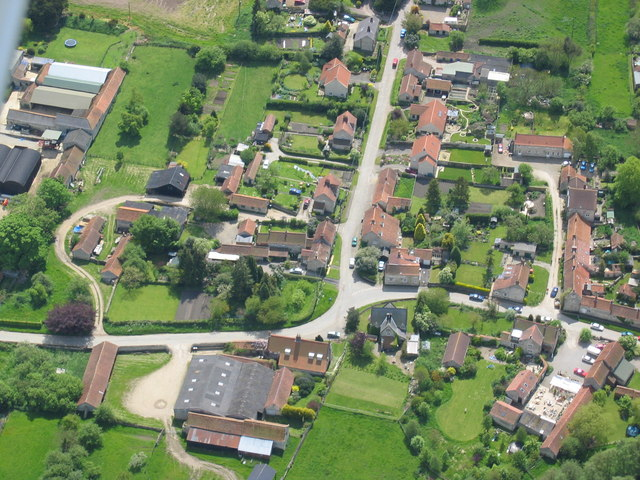
- Nunnington from the air in 2005

- Location within North Yorkshire
- Population: 361 (2011 census)
- OS grid reference: SE 666 793
- Unitary authority: North Yorkshire
- Ceremonial county: North Yorkshire
- Region: Yorkshire and the Humber
- Country: England
- Sovereign state: United Kingdom
- Post town: YORK
- Postcode district: YO62
- Police: North Yorkshire
- Fire: North Yorkshire
- Ambulance: Yorkshire
- UK Parliament: Thirsk and Malton

Nunnington is a village and civil parish in North Yorkshire, England. The River Rye runs through. Its population, including that of Stonegrave, was 361 at the 2011 census. It is rich in listed historic buildings.

From 1974 to 2023 it was part of the district of Ryedale. It is now administered by the unitary North Yorkshire Council.

== History ==
Nunnington Hall is a Grade I listed mansion owned by the National Trust and open to the public. The village has 28 other houses and features listed Grade II, and the Grade II*-listed Nunnington Bridge.

=== Church ===
All Saints' and St James' Church, Nunnington is a Grade I listed building. The nave and chancel date from the late 13th century and the tower from 1672. The tower, porch and vestry were rebuilt in 1883–1884. There is a fine 17th-century pulpit.

There is a tomb in the church said to belong to a man named Peter Loschy, who slew a dragon in Loschy Wood. In fact, the tomb belongs to Sir Walter de Teyes of Stonegrave Manor.

== Amenities ==
=== School ===
The nearest schools are at Kirkbymoorside and Malton. Nunnington Church of England School dwindled and closed seemingly before the Second World War.

=== Public transport ===
Nunnington railway station lay 1 mile (1.6 km) west of the village. It closed to passengers in 1953. The nearest railway station is at Malton (10.2 miles, 16.4 km). There are no public bus services for the village at present.

== Notable residents ==
Former residents of Nunnington have included the writers Annie Keary (1825–1879) and Eliza Harriett Keary (1827–1918) in the 1840s, while their father William Keary (died 1859) was rector. Annie Keary's children's book Mia and Charlie; or a Week's Holiday at Ryedale Rectory (London/Winchester, 1855) recounts the story of a Proud Lady of "Nunningham", who haunts the hall.

Sir Herbert Read, the anarchist poet and critic, was born at nearby Muscoates in 1893 and lived at Muscoates Grange Farm.

Bart Harrison, a racing driver, was born here in 2007.

== Gallery ==
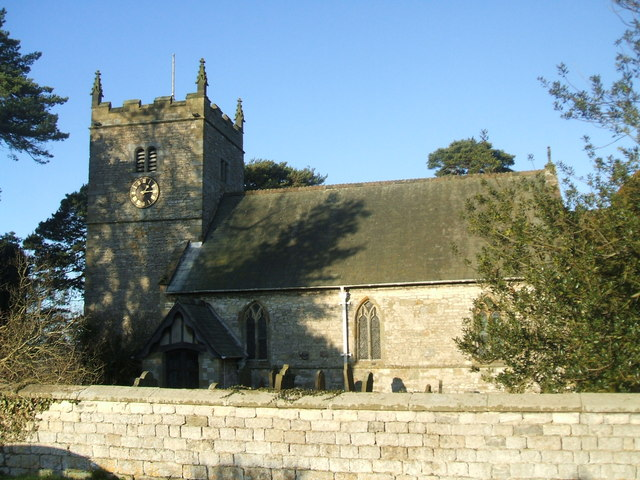
All Saints' and St. James' Church

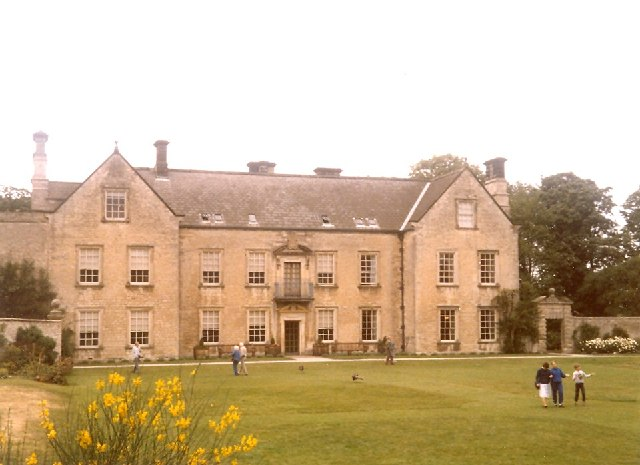
Nunnington Hall

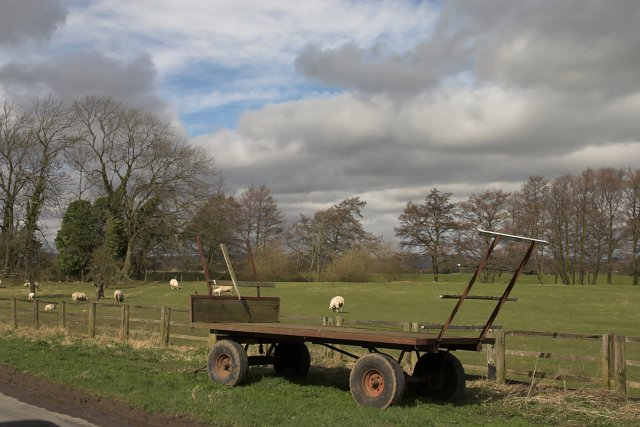
Looking to the River Rye from West Ness

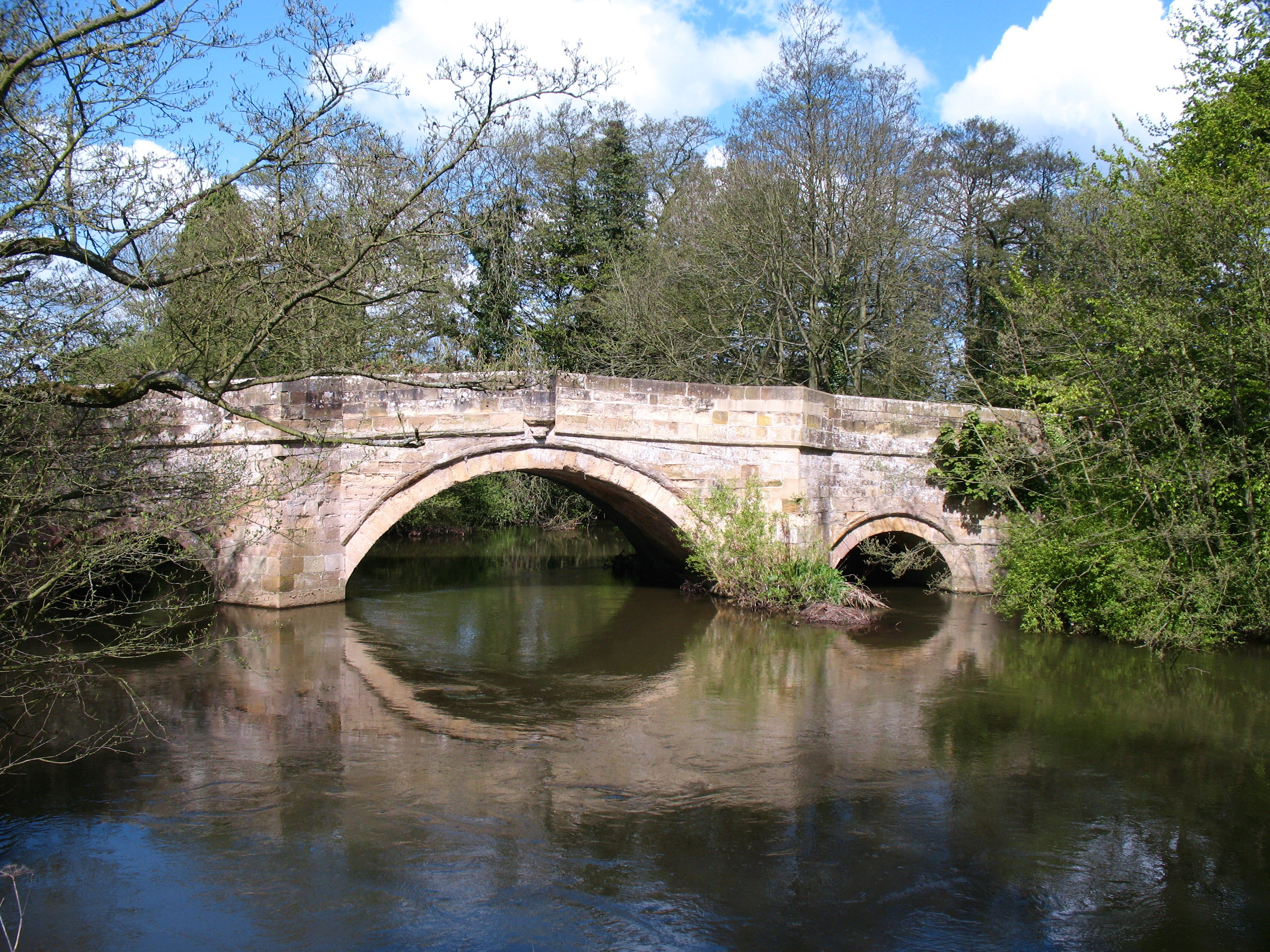
Nunnington Bridge

== See also ==
- Listed buildings in Nunnington
