= Pistol grip (disambiguation) =

A pistol grip is a handle for a firearm, drill, or other tool.

Pistol grip may also refer to:

- Pistol grip (fencing), a type grip for a foil or épée in fencing
- Pistol Grip (painting), a 2014 painting by Michael Zavros

== See also ==
- "Pistolgrip Pump", a song by Volume 10 from the 1994 album Hip-Hopera, covered by Rage Against the Machine on the 2000 album Renegades
