= Allerton Priory =

Priory in Liverpool, Merseyside, England

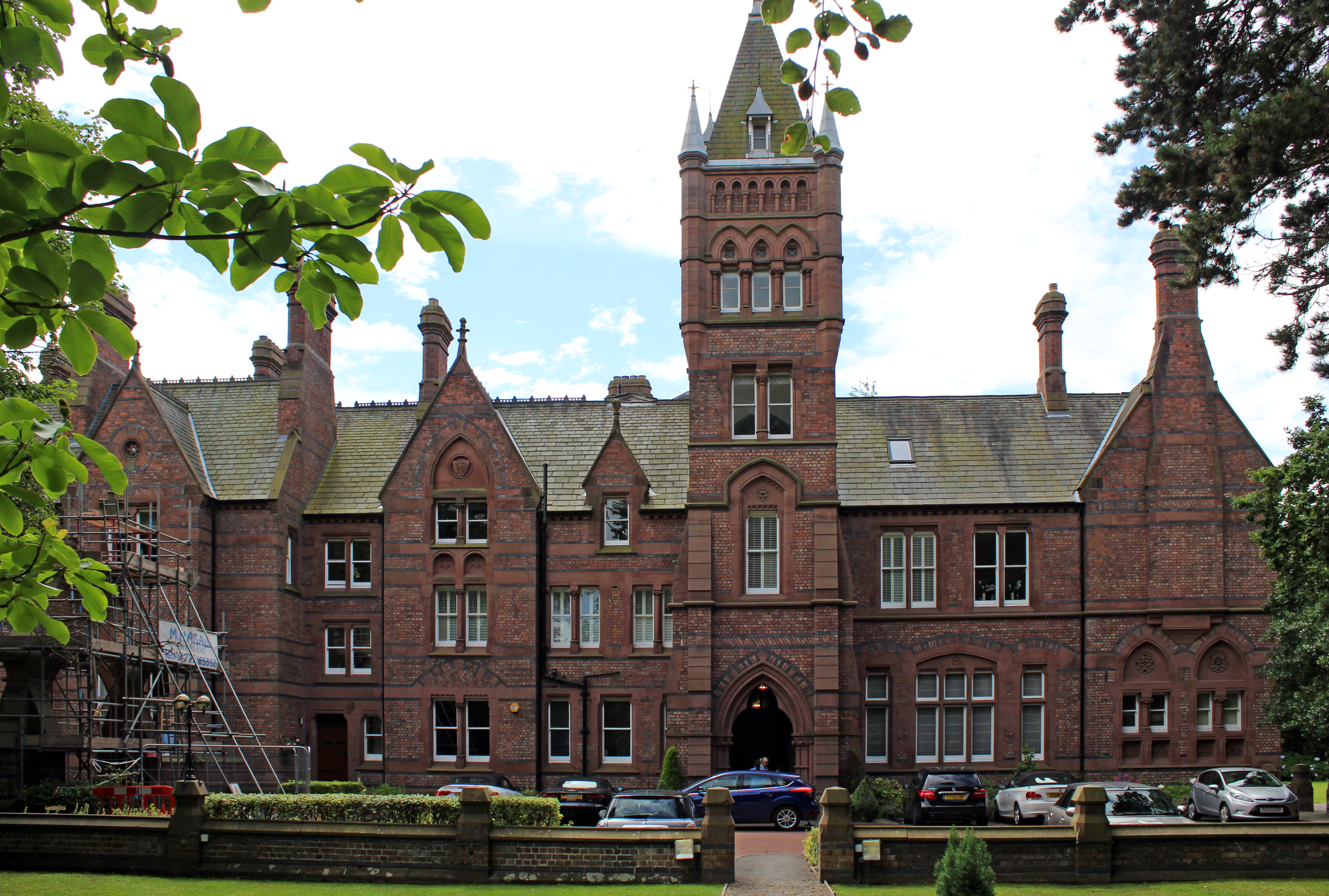
- Front elevation of Allerton Priory
- Interactive map of the Allerton Priory area

General information
- Location: Ye Priory Court, Liverpool, England
- Coordinates: 53.3696°N 2.8825°W
- Year built: 1867–70

Design and construction
- Architect: Alfred Waterhouse
- Designations

Listed Building – Grade II*
- Official name: Allerton Priory
- Designated: 12 July 1966
- Reference no.: 1068415

Allerton Priory is a Grade II* listed building in Liverpool, England, designed by Alfred Waterhouse and completed in 1870.

A house originally known as Allerton Lodge, but later Allerton Priory, was built on the site in the early 1800s for William Rutson, a Liverpool merchant. In 1866 John Grant Morris, Mayor of Liverpool and a colliery owner, bought the estate and commissioned architect Alfred Waterhouse to rebuild the house.

In 1897 a Monsignor Nugent (1822–1905) founded a House of Providence (or Magdalen Asylum), which was run by nuns as a refuge for unmarried Irish girls. In 1915 the sisters established a (residential) School for Special Educational Needs, again for girls. It was temporary certified on 18 May 1916 for 15 girls, then re-certified in 1917 as Allerton Priory Special Industrial School for mentally defective girls under 15. It ceased to be a Home Office school in 1933. The nuns owned the property until 1986.

The property was then purchased by Danny Mullholland and converted to a nursing home, which was managed by a local family until 1994/1995. The house has since been converted into luxury apartments. Around 2010 it was a film location as "Anubis House" for the Nickelodeon TV series House of Anubis.

== Gallery ==
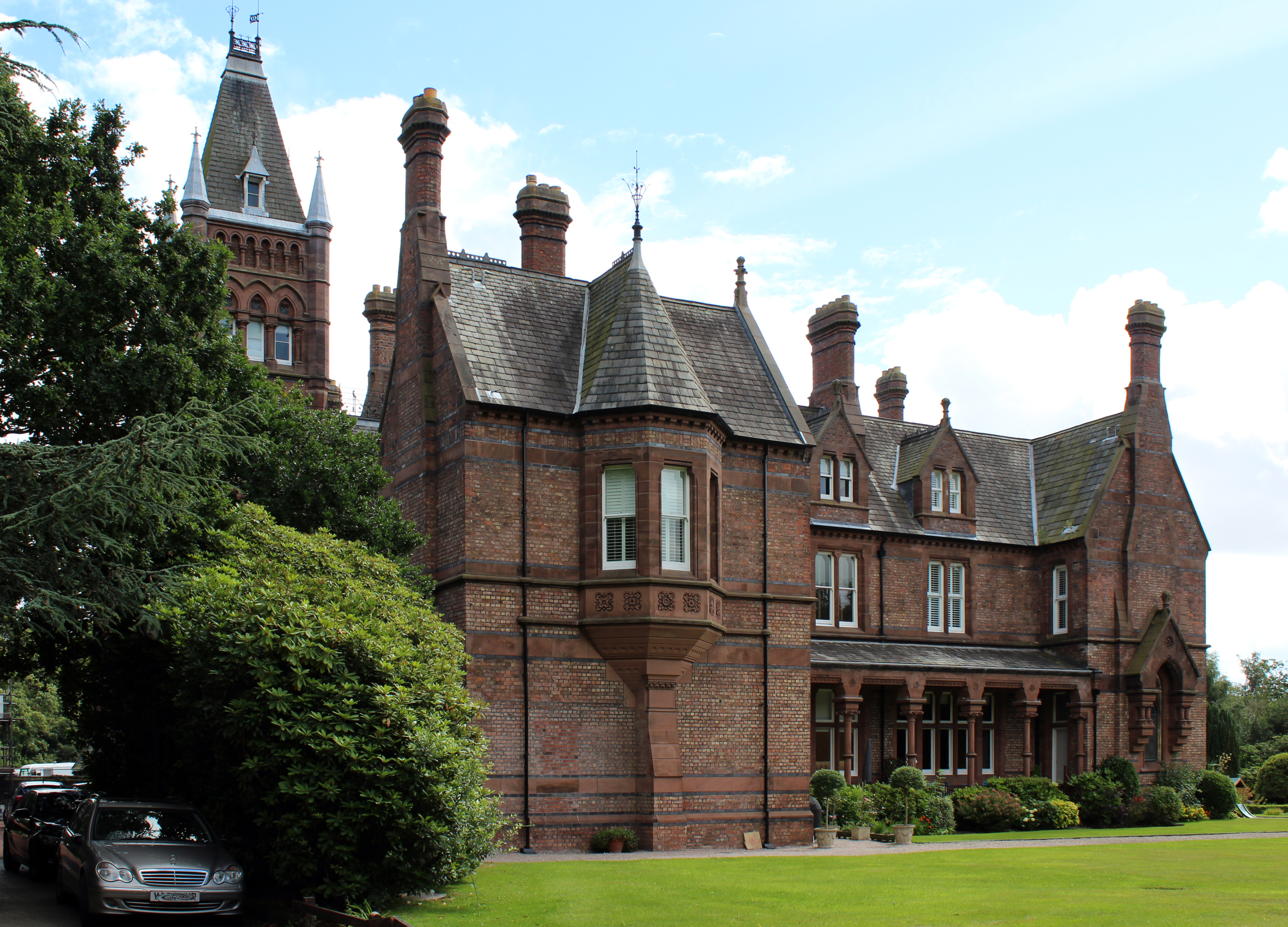
Side elevation of Allerton Priory

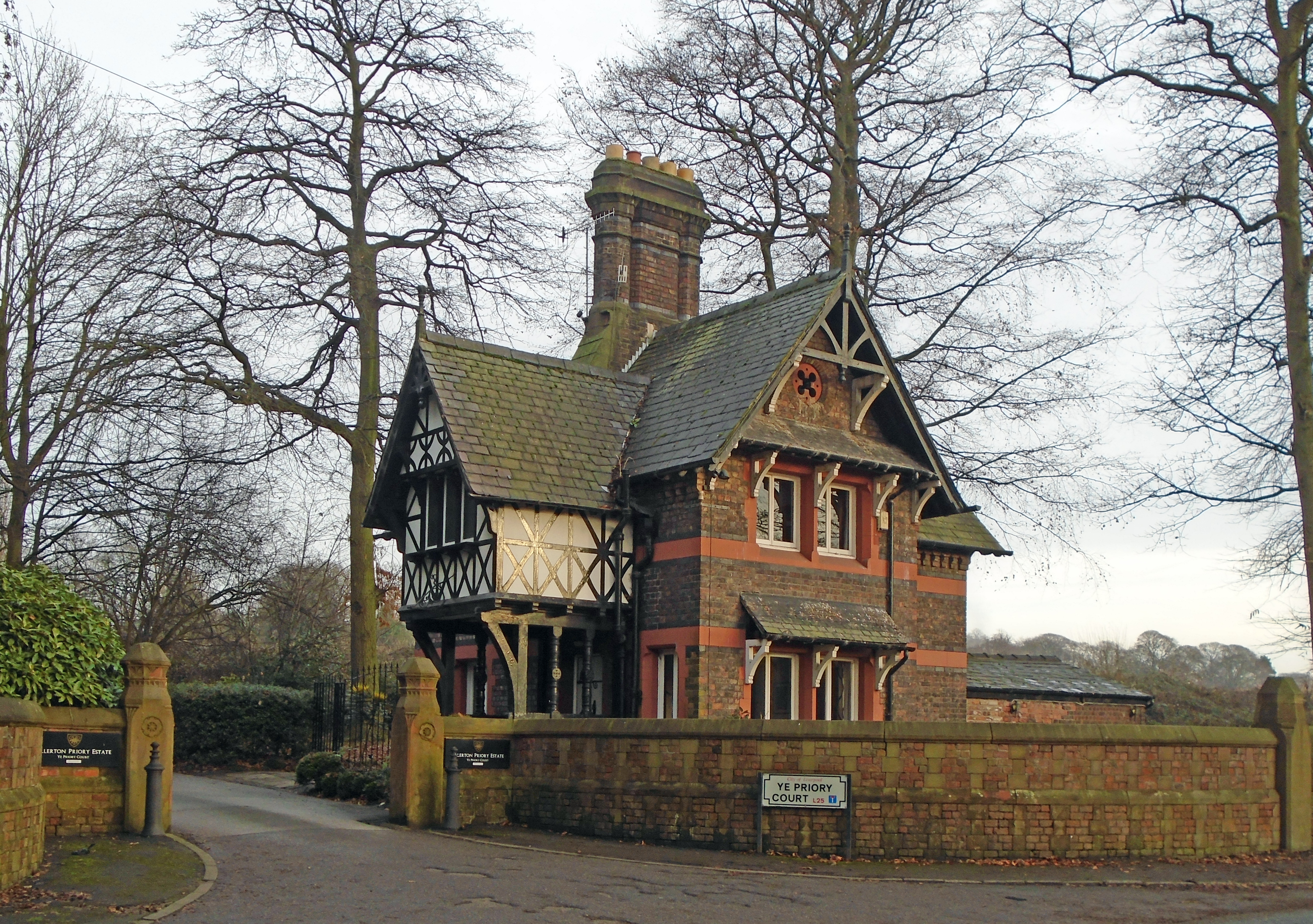
Lodge to the grounds of Allerton Priory

== See also ==
- Architecture of Liverpool
- Grade II* listed buildings in Liverpool – Suburbs
